= Julian (surname) =

Julian is a surname. See also Julien (surname) for a variation.

Notable people with that surname include

== Sports ==
- Alan Julian (born 1983), Northern Ireland footballer
- Bill Julian (1867 – 1957), English football player and coach
- Brendon Julian (born 1970), Australian cricketer
- Cyril Julian (born 1974), French basketball player.
- Doggie Julian (1901 – 1967), American football, basketball, and baseball player and coach
- Elton Julian (born 1974), American professional racing driver and racing team owner
- Fred Julian (1938 – 2013), American football player and coach
- Jeff Julian (golfer) (1961 – 2004), American golfer
- Pete Julian (born 1971), American athlete
- Julian Savea (born 1990), new Zealand professional rugby player

== Arts ==
- Alexander Julian (born 1948), American clothing designer
- Arthur Julian (1923 – 1995), American actor, producer and television writer
- Charles-André Julien, French historian
- Don Julian (musician) (1937 – 1998), American singer, guitarist and songwriter
- Janet Julian (born 1959), American actress
- Joanne Julian, Armenian/ American artist
- Madhav Julian (1894 – 1939), Marathi poet
- Paul Julian (artist) (1914 – 1995), American background animator, sound effects artist, and voice actor
- Peter Julian (artist) (born 1952), American artist
- Renz Julian (born 1979), American rapper
- Rodolphe Julian (1839 - 1907), French painter, etcher and professor
- Rupert Julian (1879 – 1943), New Zealand cinema actor, director, writer and producer
- Shirley Julian (1914 – 1995), American artist and pacificist

== Politics ==
- Ana Pastor Julián (born 1957), Spanish doctor and politician
- Anthony Julian (1902 – 1984), American judge
- George Washington Julian (1817-1899), US Representative and Abolitionist from Indiana
- Henry S. Julian (1862–1939), American lawyer and politician
- Larry Julian (born 1949), American politician
- Maricela Contreras Julián (born 1961), Mexican politician
- Patti Julian, American lawyer and politician
- Peter Julian (born 1962), Canadian politician
- Robert F. Julian, American lawyer and former sports executive
- William Alexander Julian (1870 – 1949), American politician

== Other ==
- Anna Johnson Julian (1903 – 1994), African-American civic activist
- Chris Julian (designer), designer, philanthropist and retail entrepreneur
- C. C. Julian (1885–1934), Canadian-American oil company promoter
- George Julian (disambiguation)
- Hubert Julian (1897 – 1983), Trinidad aviation
- John Julian (priest) (1839 – 1913), English clergyman
- Joseph R. Julian (1918 – 1945), American military officer
- Ivor Julian (1895 – 1971), English public administrator
- Paul Julian (meteorologist) (born 1929), American meteorologist
- Percy Lavon Julian (1899 – 1975), American research chemist

== See also ==
- Julian (disambiguation)
