= Julie =

Julie may refer to:

- Julie (given name), a list of people and fictional characters with the name

== Film and television ==
- Julie (1956 film), an American film noir starring Doris Day
- Julie (1975 film), a Hindi film by K. S. Sethumadhavan featuring Lakshmi
- Julie (1998 film), a British public information film about seatbelt use
- Julie (2004 film), a Hindi film starring Neha Dhupia
  - Julie 2, its 2016 sequel starring Raai Laxmi
- Julie (2006 film), a Kannada film starring Ramya
- Julie (TV series), a 1992 American sitcom starring Julie Andrews

== Literature ==
- Julie; or, The New Heloise, a 1761 novel by Jean-Jacques Rousseau
- Julie (George novel), a 1994 novel, the second book of a trilogy, by Jean Craighead George
- Julie, a 1985 novel by Cora Taylor

== Music ==
- Julie (opera), a 2005 opera by Philippe Boesmans
- Julie (band), an American shoegaze band

=== Albums ===
- Julie (album), by Julie London, 1957
- Julie (EP) or the title song, by Jens Lekman, 2004

=== Songs ===
- "Julie", by Doris Day, 1956
- "Julie" (Daniel song), 1983
- "Julie", by David Bowie, the B-side of "Day-In Day-Out", 1987
- "Julie", by Levellers from Levellers, 1993
- "Julie", by Damian Marley from Mr. Marley, 1996
- "Julie", by Prism from Prism, 1977
- "Julie", by Take That from The Circus, 2008
- "Julie", by Ali Zafar, 2017

== Other uses ==
- Julie (mango), a mango cultivar
- Julidochromis or julies, a genus of cichlid fish

== See also ==
- Jules, a given name
- Juli (disambiguation)
- Julia (disambiguation)
- Julien (disambiguation)
- Juliette (disambiguation)
- July (disambiguation)
- Miss Julie (disambiguation)
- Oh Julie (disambiguation)
- Yulia, a given name
