= Julien =

Julien may refer to:

== People ==
- Julien (given name)
- Julien (surname)

== Music ==
- Julien (opera), a 1913 poème lyrique by Gustave Charpentier
- Julien (album), by Dalida, 1973
- "Julien" (song), by Carly Rae Jepsen, 2019

== Places ==
=== United States ===
- Julien's Auctions, an auction house in Los Angeles, California
- Julien's Restorator (ca.1793-1823), a restaurant in Boston, Massachusetts
- Julien Hall (Boston), a building built in 1825 in Boston, Massachusetts
- Brasserie Julien, an American restaurant in New York City

=== Elsewhere ===
- Julien Day School, a co-educational primary, secondary and senior secondary school in Kolkata, West Bengal, India
- Julien Inc., a Canadian stainless steel fabrication company
- Camp Julien, the main base for the Canadian contingent of the International Security Assistance Force in Kabul, Afghanistan
- Fort Julien, a fort in Egypt originally built by the Ottoman Empire and occupied by the French
- Pont Julien, a Roman stone arch bridge over the Calavon river in the south-east of France

== Other uses ==
- a French adjective meaning related to Julius Caesar
- Automobiles Julien, a former French automobile manufacturer

== See also ==
- Julian (disambiguation)
- Saint-Julien (disambiguation)
