= Julian the Hospitaller =

4th-century Christian saint

Saint Julian the Hospitaller
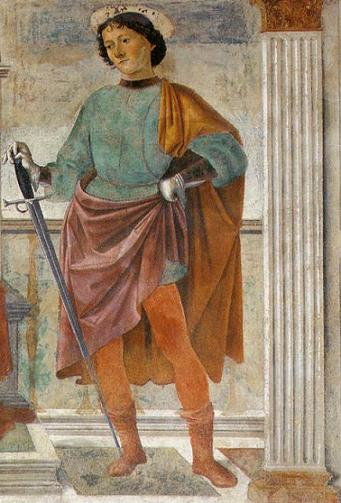
- Saint Julian, from a fresco; by Domenico Ghirlandaio
- Born: 4th Century
- Venerated in: Catholic Church; Eastern Orthodox Church
- Feast: 12 February
- Attributes: Carrying a leper through a river, ferryman, oar, holding an oar; hart, stag, man listening to a talking stag, young hunter with a stag; with Jesus and Martha as patrons of travellers; young man wearing a fur-lined cloak, sword, and gloves; young man holding a hawk on his finger
- Patronage: Occupations: Boatmen and ferrymen; carnival and circus workers, clowns; fiddlers, fiddle players, wandering musicians, jugglers; hospitallers, hospitality ministers, hotel-keepers, innkeepers; hunters, knights, shepherds; Personal circumstances: childless people; murderers; to obtain lodging while travelling, pilgrims, travellers; Places: Ghent (Belgium); St. Julian's (Malta); Macerata (Italy)

Saint Julian the Hospitaller (Note: Sometimes called Saint Julian the Poor, probably from the saint's association, as one of its three patronal saints, with the Parisian church, in French: Saint-Julien-le-Pauvre, lit. 'Saint Julian the Poor'. The church was noted from its earliest incarnation (6th century) for its hospice for pilgrims and poor travellers. Its name Julian the Poor came from this, so avoiding singling out only one saint from its triple dedication (to Julian of Le Mans and Julian of Brioude, along with the Hospitaller) that it later acquired, once the church's original dedication had become obscured by the passage of time.) is a saint venerated in the Catholic Church and Eastern Orthodox Church. He is the patron saint of the cities of Ghent, Belgium; Saint Julian's, Malta; and Macerata, Italy.

== History and patronage ==
The earliest known reference to Julian dates to the late twelfth century.

There are three main theories of his origin:

- Born in Le Mans, France (possibly from confusion with Saint Julian of Le Mans)
- Born in Ath, Belgium, around 7 AD
- Born in Naples, Italy

The location of the hospitals built by him is also debated between the banks of the River Gardon in Provence and an island near the River Potenza heading to Macerata.

The Pater Noster (The Our Father, or Lord's Prayer) of Saint Julian can be found as early as 1353 in Boccaccio's Decameron, and is still passed on by word of mouth throughout some places in Italy. The account is included the 13th-century Legenda Aurea by the Genoan Jacobus de Voragine, a Dominican priest. Beautiful stained glass depicting Saint Julian by an unknown artist in Chartres Cathedral also dates back to the 13th century. Early fresco paintings of him are found in Trento Cathedral (14th century) and the Palazzo Comunale di Assisi ('town hall').

Saint Julian is invoked as the patron of hospitality by travellers on a journey and far from home pray hoping to find safe lodging.

== Golden Legend ==
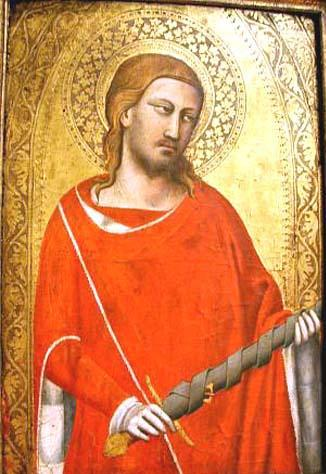
Saint Julian. Taddeo Gaddi, 14th century.

According to Jacobus de Voragine, on the night Julian was born, his father, a man of noble blood, saw pagan witches secretly lay a curse on the boy that would make him kill both his parents. His father wanted to get rid of the child, but his mother did not let him do so. As the boy grew into a handsome young man, his mother would often burst into tears because of the sin her son was destined to commit. When he finally found out the reason for her tears, he swore he "would never commit such a sin" and "with great belief in Christ went off full of courage" as far away from his parents as he could.

Some versions say that it was his mother who told him at the age of 10, while others say it was a stag he met in the forest while hunting (a situation used in artistic depictions of the saint). After fifty days of walking he finally reached Galicia, where he married a "good woman", said to be a wealthy widow.

Twenty years later, his parents decided to go look for their now thirty-year-old son. When they arrived, they visited the altar of St James, son of Zebedee. On leaving the church they met a woman sitting on a chair outside, whom they asked for shelter for the night as they were tired. She took them in and told them that her husband, Julian, was out hunting. (This is why he is also known as the patron of hunters.) Having found their son, the mother and father were overjoyed, as was Julian's wife. She treated them well and gave them Julian's bed. But the devil went off seeking Julian and told him that his wife was with another man.

Julian returned home and found two people asleep in his bed. Thinking that they were his wife and her lover, he killed them both. When he discovered his mistake, he vowed to spend the rest of his life doing charitable works. He and his wife made a pilgrimage to Rome. They continued their travels until they came to a river crossing. There they built a hospice to welcome weary and sick travellers, and Julian assisted people in crossing the river.

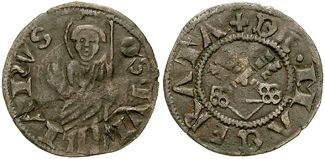
Quattrino of Macerata depicting St Julian

In another pious legend, the devil, disguised as a pilgrim weak from travel, was allowed into the hospice with other travellers. At midnight, the evildoer awoke, wreaked havoc in the house, causing mess and destruction. The following morning Julian saw the damage and swore never to let anyone else into his home. He was so furious he had everyone leave. Jesus went to him, again as a pilgrim, seeking rest. He asked humbly, in the name of God, for shelter. But Julian refused. After recognizing him, Julian retracted his statement and decided to help all those who needed it once again.

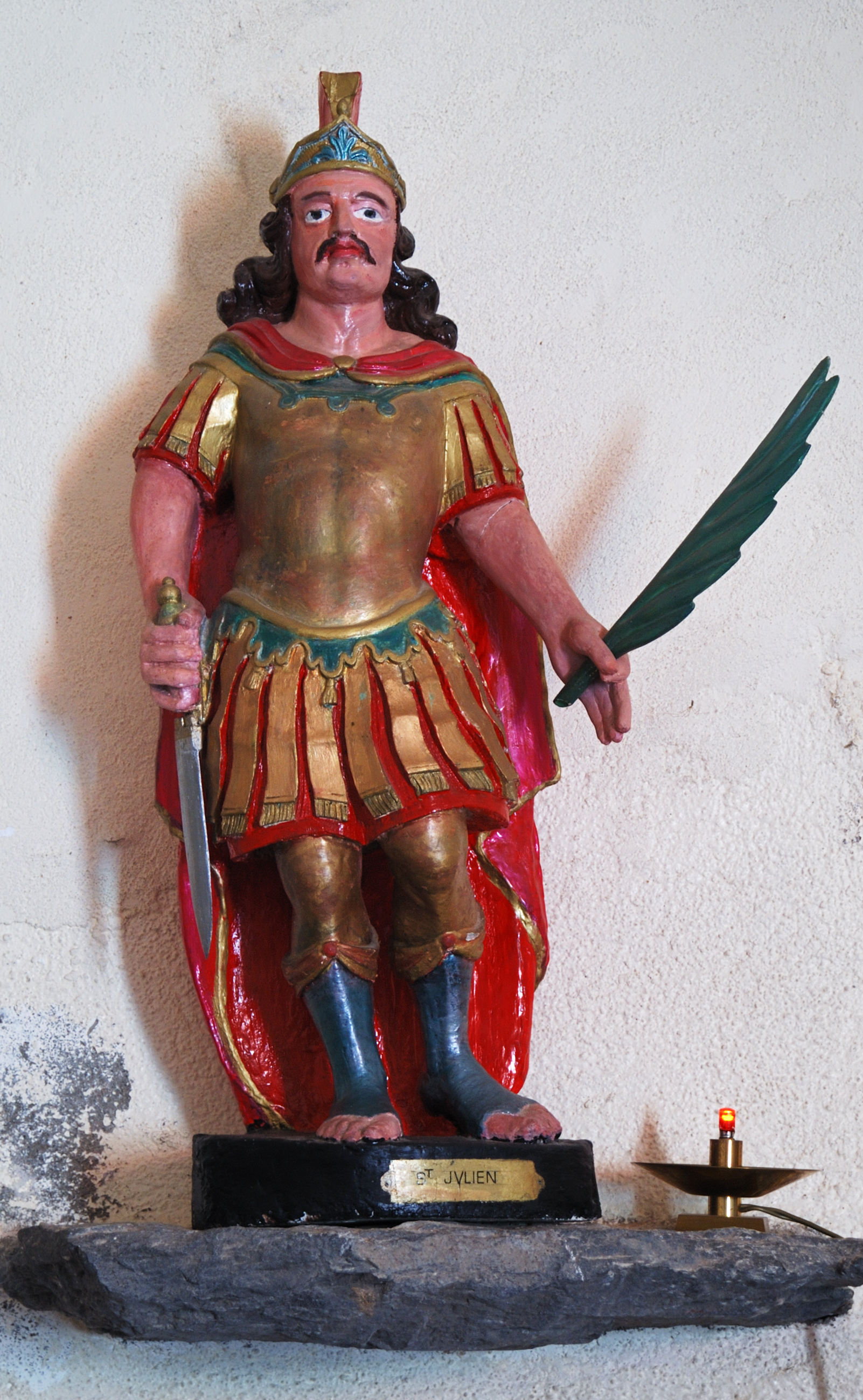
Statue of Saint Julian in the church of Saint-Julien (Puy-de-Dôme, France).

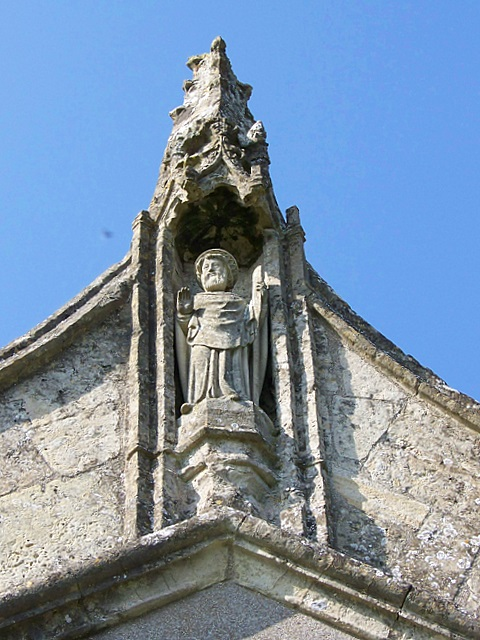
Statue of Julian holding an oar at the Church of St Julian the Hospitaller in Wellow, Somerset.

== Veneration in Malta ==
Devotion to Saint Julian started in the Maltese Islands in the 15th century after the discovery of his relics in the city of Macerata. It was introduced by the noble family of De Astis, high-ranking in Malta at the time, who had strong connections with the Bishop of Macerata. Three churches were built in his honour before the arrival of the Knights Hospitaller: in Tabija, towards Mdina; in Luqa; and in Senglea. This latter church had a storage room for hunters, and served to popularise this devotion by means of the sailors arriving in the Three Cities. In the 16th century there existed a hospital, Ospedale di San Giuliano, in the Citadella in Gozo, which showed a great devotion to the saint. Being an order of hospitallers, the Knights of Saint John helped to further spread devotion to the saint. In 1539, they rebuilt the church in Senglea and in 1590, they built another church in the parish of Birkirkara, a section that since then has been called St Julian's. In 1891, the church was made a parish, the only one ever dedicated to the saint in Malta.

== In literature and music ==
- Gustave Flaubert wrote a short story entitled "La légende de Saint-Julien l'Hospitalier", included in his Three Tales.
- Subject of an opera by Camille Erlanger, La légende de Saint-Julien l'Hospitalier (1888) based on the Flaubert story.
- Subject of an opera by Riccardo Zandonai, Giuliano (1928) with libretto by Arturo Rossato, based on stories by Jacobus de Voragine and Gustave Flaubert.
- Walter Wangerin, Jr. wrote a novel, classified as historical fiction, titled "Saint Julian".
- One of the tales in Giovanni Boccaccio's Decameron is named The miracle of Saint Julian, and is about a faithful devotee of St Julian whose faith is put to test during a travel.
- In The Chronicles of Julian, the Hospitaller, a historical fiction set at the turn of the first millennium, St Julian meets the devil throughout his life, leading to an ultimate confrontation at the construction site of the Ponte della Maddalena bridge at Borgo a Mozzano, in Lucca, Tuscany.
- In Sir Gawain and the Green Knight, Gawain gives thanks to Saint Julian when he first finds a castle after his long journey through the wilderness.

== Placenames ==
- St. Julian's – a town in Malta
- San Zulian – a church in Venice
- São Julião – list of placenames in Portugal and Brazil
- Saint-Julien-le-Pauvre – a 12th-century Gothic church in Paris, built on an earlier 6th-century foundation
- San Julián – list of placenames in Spanish-speaking – or Spanish-influenced – areas

== See also ==
- Saint Julian, other saints with the same name
- Category:Paintings of Julian the Hospitaller
