= Julian =

Julian may refer to:

== People ==
- Julian (emperor) (331–363), Roman emperor from 361 to 363
- Julian, of the Roman gens Julia, with imperial dynasty offshoots
- Saint Julian (disambiguation), several Christian saints
- Julian (given name), people with the given name Julian
- Julian (surname), people with the surname Julian
- Julian (singer), Russian pop singer
- Julian, rapper and former member of Odd Future

== Places ==
- Julian, California, a census-designated place in San Diego County
- Julian, Kansas, an unincorporated community in Stanton County
- Julian, Nebraska, a village in Nemaha County
- Julian, North Carolina, a census-designated place in Guilford County
- Julian, Pennsylvania, an unincorporated community and census-designated place in Centre County
- Julian, West Virginia, an unincorporated community in Boone County

== Arts and entertainment ==
- Julian (2012 film), an Australian short film about Julian Assange
- Julian (2025 film), a Belgian-Dutch drama film directed by Cato Kusters
- Julián (film), 2026 film
- Julian (album), a 1976 album by Pepper Adams
- Julian (novel), a 1964 novel by Gore Vidal about the emperor
- Julian (play), an 1823 play by Mary Russell Mitford
- Julian (Trailer Park Boys), a fictional character

== Other uses ==
- Julian (geology), a substage of the Carnian stage of the Late Triassic Period
- Tropical Storm Julian, various storms

== See also ==
- Julian calendar, introduced by Julius Caesar in 46 BC (708 AUC), a reform of the Roman calendar
- Julian day, the continuous count of days since the beginning of the Julian Period
- Julian Alps, part of the Alps in Italy and Slovenia
- Académie Julian, a former art school in Paris
- Count Julian (novel), a 1970 novel by Juan Goytisolo
- Julians (disambiguation)
- Julianus (disambiguation)
- Jullien, a French surname
- Julienne (disambiguation)
- Julien Inc., a stainless steel fabrication company
- Frederick Juliand (1806–?), New York politician
