= Julis (disambiguation) =

Julis is a village in Northern Israel

Julis may also refer to:

- Julis, Gaza, a former village in Gaza, Israel
- Julis Cuvier, 1814, a synonym of the fish genus Coris

Youth organizations:

- Young Liberals (Germany), or Junge Liberale ("Julis")
- Young Liberals (Austria), or Junge Liberale ("Julis"), now: JUNOS – Young liberal NEOS

People:

- Mitchell R. Julis, American businessman
- Lukáš Juliš, Czech footballer

== See also ==
- Juli (disambiguation)
