= Julianus =

Julianus may refer to:

- Julianus (frog), a genus of frogs in the family Hylidae
- Flavius Claudius Julianus (331–363), Roman emperor from 361 to 363 best known as Julian
- Saint Julianus (disambiguation), several Roman-era Christian saints
- Julianus (consul) (fl. 130 AD), Roman senator
- Julius Julianus (fl. 315–325 AD), Roman politician
- Lucius Julius Julianus, Roman military officer
- Lucius Julius Vehilius Gratus Julianus, Roman military officer
- Didius Julianus, Roman military commander and politician, who briefly became Roman emperor in a bidding contest held by the Praetorian Guard

== See also ==
- Julian (disambiguation)
