= Peter Julian (disambiguation) =

Peter Julian is the name of:

- Pete Julian (born 1971), American long-distance runner and coach
- Peter Julian (born 1962), Canadian politician
- Peter Julian (artist) (born 1952), American painter

== See also ==
- Julian Peter, Pakistan Army general
