= Joseph Bradbury =

Joseph Bradbury may refer to:

- Joe Bradbury, English rugby league footballer
- Joseph Perry Bradbury (1838–1915), American politician and judge in Ohio
