= Chris Julian =

Chris Julian may refer to:

- Chris Julian (producer) (born 1957), American film and music producer
- Chris Julian (speedway rider) (1947–1997), British speedway rider
- Chris Julian (designer), philanthropist and retail entrepreneur
