= 1920 United States Senate election in Ohio =

- November 2, 1920
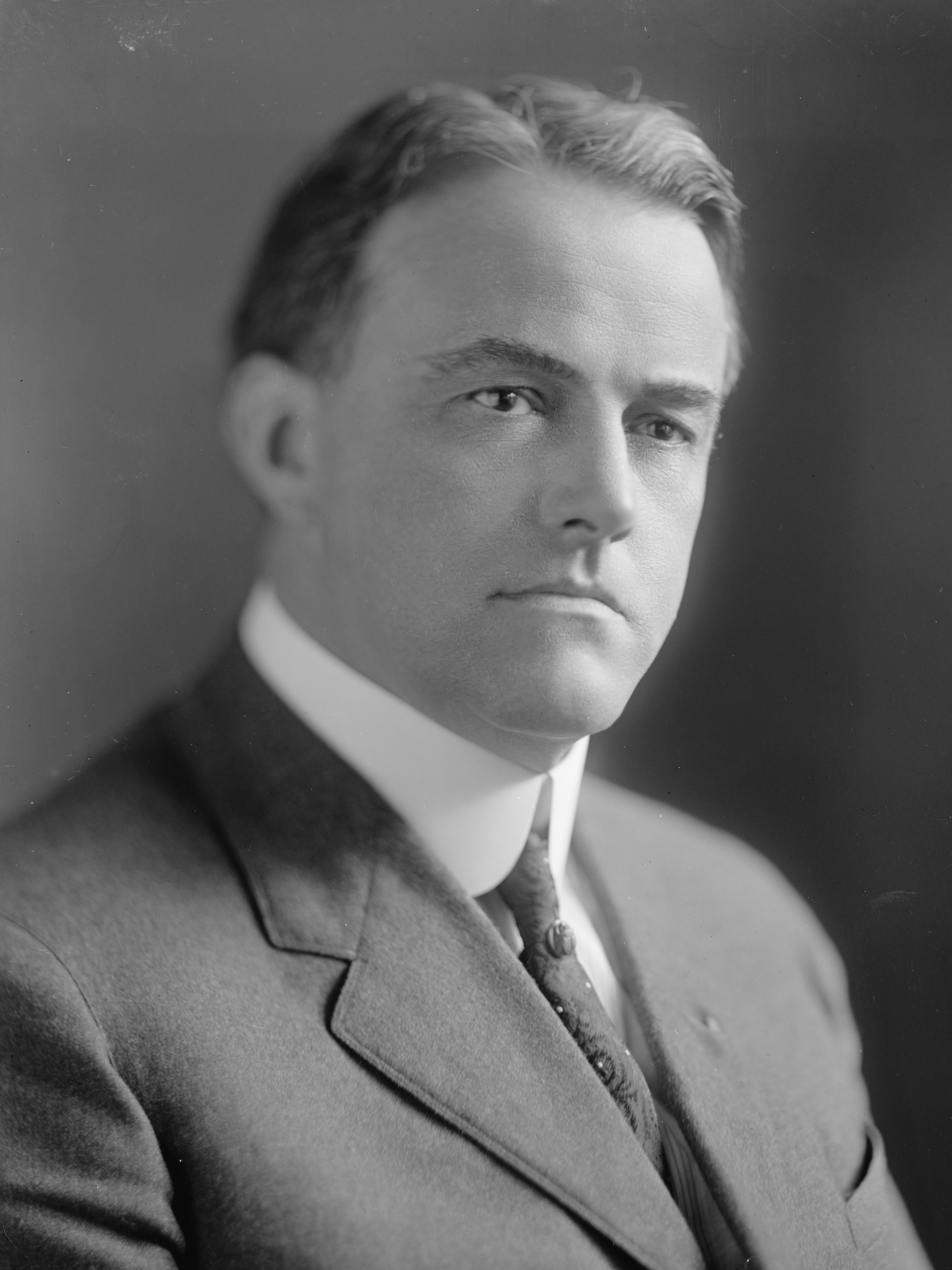

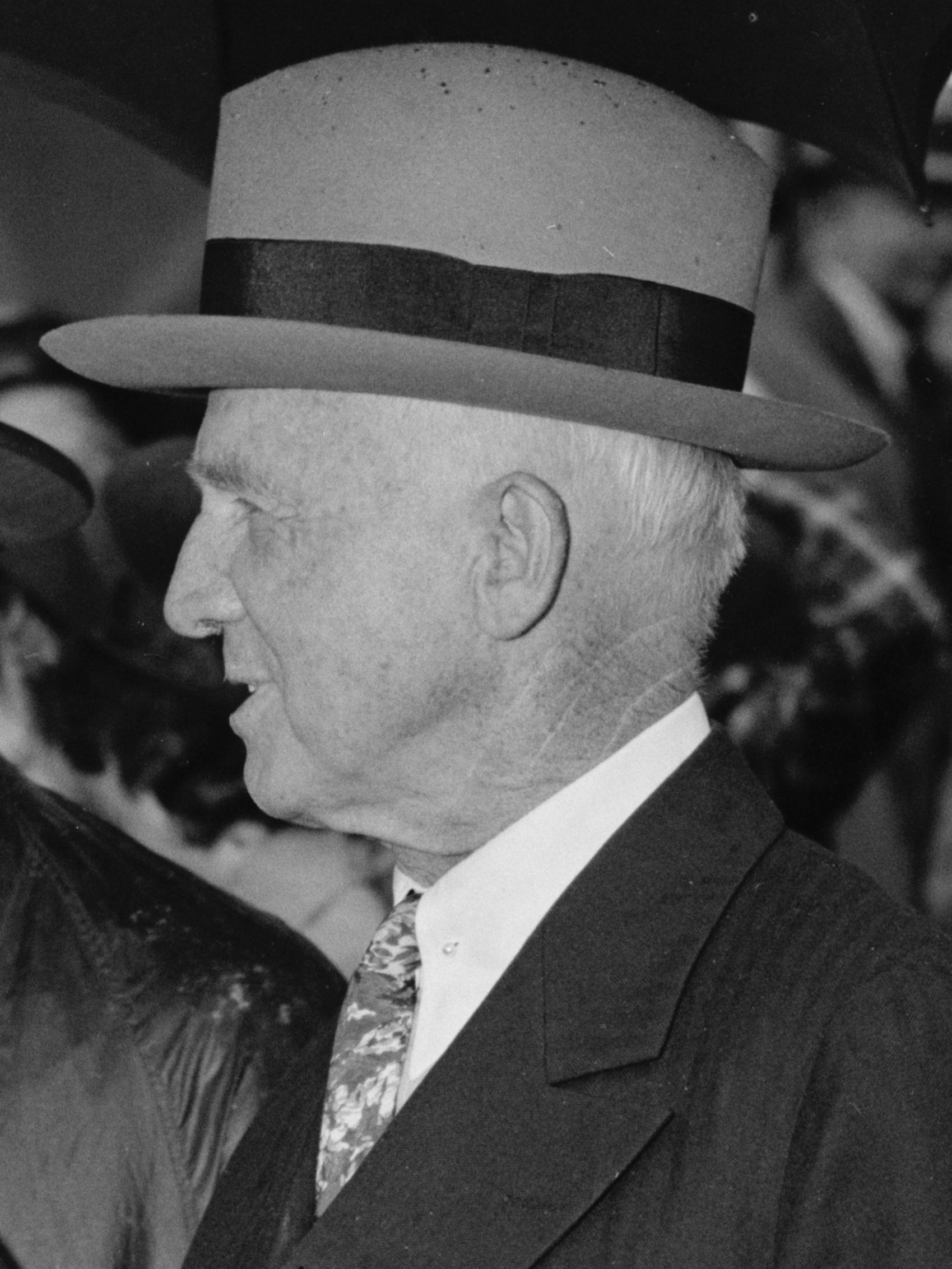
| Nominee | Frank B. Willis | W. A. Julian |
| Party | Republican | Democratic |
| Popular vote | 1,134,953 | 782,650 |
| Percentage | 59.10% | 40.76% |
- County results Willis: 50–60% 60–70% 70–80% Julian: 50–60% 60–70%
U.S. senator before election
Warren Harding
Republican
Elected U.S. Senator
Frank B. Willis
Republican

The 1920 United States Senate special election in Ohio was held on November 2, 1920. Incumbent Republican Senator Warren G. Harding did not run for re-election, opting instead to run for President of the United States. Republican Governor Frank B. Willis defeated William Alexander Julian in the race for the open seat.

== Republican primary ==
=== Candidates ===
- Walter Folger Brown, Toledo attorney and former leader of the Progressive Party
- Macy Walcutt, Columbus resident
- J. P. Walser, Elyria resident
- R. M. Wanamaker, Associate Justice of the Ohio Supreme Court
- Frank B. Willis, former Governor of Ohio (1915–1917)

=== Results ===
1920 Republican Senate primary
| Party | Candidate | Votes | % |
|---|---|---|---|
| Republican | Frank B. Willis | 159,159 | 49.60% |
| Republican | Walter Folger Brown | 94,969 | 29.59% |
| Republican | R. M. Wanamaker | 53,294 | 16.61% |
| Republican | J. P. Walser | 6,971 | 2.17% |
| Republican | Macy Walcutt | 6,513 | 2.03% |
| Total votes | | 320,906 | 100.00% |

== Democratic primary ==
=== Candidates ===
- William Alexander Julian, banker
- A. F. O'Neil, Akron municipal court judge and World War I veteran

=== Results ===
1920 Democratic Senate primary
| Party | Candidate | Votes | % |
|---|---|---|---|
| Democratic | William Alexander Julian | 65,752 | 51.15% |
| Democratic | A. F. O'Neil | 62,791 | 48.85% |
| Total votes | | 128,543 | 100.00% |

== General election ==
=== Results ===
1920 U.S. Senate special election in Ohio
| Party | Candidate | Votes | % | ±% |
|---|---|---|---|---|
| Republican | Frank B. Willis | 1,134,953 | 59.10% | ▲9.94 |
| Democratic | William Alexander Julian | 782,650 | 40.76% | ▲1.16 |
| Independent | Henry B. Strong | 2,647 | 0.14% | N/A |
| Total votes | | 1,920,250 | 100.00% | |

== See also ==
- 1920 United States Senate elections
