= Saint-Julien =

Saint-Julien or St Julien is the French spelling for the English name "Julian." It may also refer to:

== People ==
- Franz Xaver Saint-Julien (1756–1836), an Austrian infantry commander during the French Revolutionary Wars and the War of the Fifth Coalition
- Guy St-Julien (born 1940), a Canadian politician
- Marlon St. Julien (born 1972), an American equestrian professional in Thoroughbred horse racing
- Pierre Saint-Julien (1765–1827 or later), a farmer and political figure in Lower Canada
- Saint Julian of Le Mans, the first bishop of Le Mans, France
- St. Julien R. Marshall (1904–1989), US Marine Corps officer
- Thais St. Julien (1945–2019), an American opera singer

== Places ==
Saint-Julien is the name or part of the name of a number of communities in the world.

=== Belgium ===
- Saint-Julien, Langemark, known as Sint-Juliaan in Flemish
- Saint Julien Memorial, a memorial to the Canadian Corps participation in the early phases in the Second Battle of Ypres of the Great War

=== Canada ===
- Saint-Julien, Quebec

=== England ===
- Church of St. Julien, Southampton

=== France ===
==== Religious ====
- Saint Julien of Le Mans

==== Municipalities ====
- Saint-Julien, Côte-d'Or, in the Côte-d'Or department
- Saint-Julien, Côtes-d'Armor, in the Côtes-d'Armor department
- Saint-Julien, Hérault, in the Hérault department
- Saint-Julien, Jura, in the Jura department
- Saint-Julien, Rhône, in the Rhône department
- Saint-Julien, Var, in the Var department
- Saint-Julien, Vosges, in the Vosges department
- Saint-Julien-aux-Bois, in the Corrèze department
- Saint-Julien-Beychevelle, in the Gironde department, covering the Saint-Julien wine producing village in Médoc
- Saint-Julien-Boutières, in the Ardèche department
- Saint-Julien-Chapteuil, in the Haute-Loire department
- Saint-Julien-d'Ance, in the Haute-Loire department
- Saint-Julien-d'Armagnac, in the Landes department
- Saint-Julien-d'Arpaon, in the Lozère department
- Saint-Julien-d'Asse, in the Alpes-de-Haute-Provence department
- Saint-Julien-de-Bourdeilles, in the Dordogne department
- Saint-Julien-de-Briola, in the Aude department
- Saint-Julien-de-Cassagnas, in the Gard department
- Saint-Julien-de-Chédon, in the Loir-et-Cher department
- Saint-Julien-de-Civry, in the Saône-et-Loire department
- Saint-Julien-de-Concelles, in the Loire-Atlantique department
- Saint-Julien-de-Coppel, in the Puy-de-Dôme department
- Saint-Julien-de-Crempse, in the Dordogne department
- Saint-Julien-de-Gras-Capou, in the Ariège department
- Saint-Julien-de-Jonzy, in the Saône-et-Loire department
- Saint-Julien-de-la-Liègue, in the Eure department
- Saint-Julien-de-Lampon, in the Dordogne department
- Saint-Julien-de-la-Nef, in the Gard department
- Saint-Julien-de-l'Escap, in the Charente-Maritime department
- Saint-Julien-de-l'Herms, in the Isère department
- Saint Julien de Mailloc, in the Calvados department
- Saint-Julien-de-Peyrolas, in the Gard department
- Saint-Julien-de-Raz, in the Isère department
- Saint-Julien-des-Chazes, in the Haute-Loire department
- Saint-Julien-des-Landes, in the Vendée department
- Saint-Julien-des-Points, in the Lozère department
- Saint-Julien-de-Toursac, in the Cantal department
- Saint-Julien-de-Vouvantes, in the Loire-Atlantique department
- Saint-Julien-d'Eymet, in the Dordogne department
- Saint-Julien-d'Oddes, in the Loire department
- Saint-Julien-du-Gua, in the Ardèche department
- Saint-Julien-du-Pinet, in the Haute-Loire department
- Saint-Julien-du-Puy, in the Tarn department
- Saint-Julien-du-Sault, in the Yonne department
- Saint-Julien-du-Serre, in the Ardèche department
- Saint-Julien-du-Terroux, in the Mayenne department
- Saint-Julien-du-Tournel, in the Lozère department
- Saint-Julien-du-Verdon, in the Alpes-de-Haute-Provence department
- Saint-Julien-en-Beauchêne, in the Hautes-Alpes department
- Saint-Julien-en-Born, in the Landes department
- Saint-Julien-en-Champsaur, in the Hautes-Alpes department
- Saint-Julien-en-Genevois, in the Haute-Savoie department
- Saint-Julien-en-Quint, in the Drôme department
- Saint-Julien-en-Saint-Alban, in the Ardèche department
- Saint-Julien-en-Vercors, in the Drôme department
- Saint-Julien-Gaulène, in the Tarn department
- Saint-Julien-Labrousse, in the Ardèche department
- Saint-Julien-la-Geneste, in the Puy-de-Dôme department
- Saint-Julien-la-Genête, in the Creuse department
- Saint-Julien-l'Ars, in the Vienne department
- Saint-Julien-la-Vêtre, in the Loire department
- Saint-Julien-le-Châtel, in the Creuse department
- Saint Julien le Faucon, in the Calvados department
- Saint-Julien-le-Pèlerin, in the Corrèze department
- Saint-Julien-le-Petit, in the Haute-Vienne department
- Saint-Julien-le-Roux, in the Ardèche department
- Saint-Julien-lès-Gorze, in the Meurthe-et-Moselle department
- Saint-Julien-lès-Metz, in the Moselle department
- Saint-Julien-lès-Montbéliard, in the Doubs department
- Saint-Julien-les-Rosiers, in the Gard department
- Saint-Julien-lès-Russey, in the Doubs department
- Saint-Julien-les-Villas, in the Aube department
- Saint-Julien-le-Vendômois, in the Corrèze department
- Saint-Julien-Maumont, in the Corrèze department
- Saint-Julien-Molhesabate, in the Haute-Loire department
- Saint-Julien-Molin-Molette, in the Loire department
- Saint-Julien-Mont-Denis, in the Savoie department
- Saint-Julien-près-Bort, in the Corrèze department
- Saint-Julien-Puy-Lavèze, in the Puy-de-Dôme department
- Saint-Julien-sous-les-Côtes, in the Meuse department
- Saint-Julien-sur-Bibost, in the Rhône department
- Saint-Julien-sur-Calonne, in the Calvados department
- Saint-Julien-sur-Cher, in the Loir-et-Cher department
- Saint-Julien-sur-Dheune, in the Saône-et-Loire department
- Saint-Julien-sur-Garonne (Formerly called Saint-Julien until 2005), in the Haute-Garonne department
- Saint-Julien-sur-Reyssouze, in the Ain department
- Saint-Julien-sur-Sarthe, in the Orne department
- Saint-Julien-sur-Veyle, in the Ain department
- Saint-Julien-Vocance, in the Ardèche department
- Erny-Saint-Julien, in the Pas-de-Calais department

=== United States ===
- St. Julien's Creek Annex, a U.S. naval support facility that provides administrative offices, light industrial shops and storage
- St. Julien (Spotsylvania County, Virginia), a historic plantation

== Other uses ==
- Saint-Julien AOC, a type of red wine in the Médoc subregion of the Bordeaux region in France
- Saint-Julien-le-Pauvre, a Melkite Greek Catholic parish church in Paris
- St. Julien Mountain, a summit in Banff National Park, Canada
- "St Julien", battle honour issued for the Second Battle of Ypres#Battle of St. Julien (23 April – 5 May) 1915

== See also ==
- Saint Julian (disambiguation)
