= Georgia Neese Clark Gray =

American actress

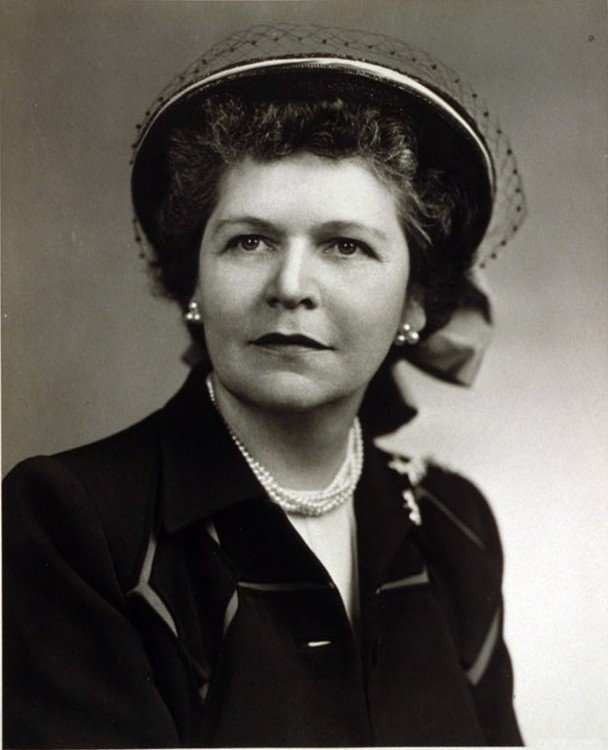

29th Treasurer of the United States
- In office June 21, 1949 – January 27, 1953
- President: Harry S. Truman; Dwight D. Eisenhower
- Preceded by: William Alexander Julian
- Succeeded by: Ivy Baker Priest

Personal details
- Born: January 27, 1898 Richland, Kansas, U.S.
- Died: October 26, 1995 (aged 97)
- Party: Democratic
- Spouse(s): George M. Clark (1929-1940s, divorced); Andrew J. Gray
- Education: Washburn University
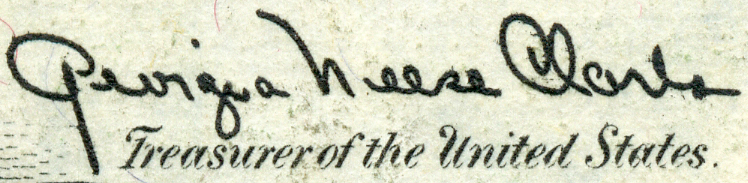
- Signature

Georgia Neese Clark Gray (January 27, 1898 – October 26, 1995) was an American actress and banker who served as the 29th treasurer of the United States from 1949 to 1953, and was the first woman to hold that office.

== Early life ==
Georgia Neese was born in Richland, Kansas, the daughter of Albert Neese, a farmer and businessman, and Ella Sullivan Neese, a stay-at-home mother. Her father, a self-made man, had prospered in the years before her birth and become the town's leading citizen, owning much of its property as well as the bank and general store. The family owned homes in Richland and in nearby Topeka where Neese attended high school graduating in 1917. Neese was a Presbyterian but she briefly attended Bethany College, an Episcopalian school for women in Topeka, before transferring to Washburn University.

Neese majored in economics at Washburn and was a member of several student organizations. She was president of the drama club and a member of the Upsilon chapter of Alpha Phi. Determined to become an actress, she moved to New York City following graduation in 1921 and enrolled at the Franklin Sargent School of Dramatic Art.

== Acting career ==
Georgia Neese began her acting career with various stock companies. Gray pursued an acting career from 1921 to 1931, living in New York City, getting to know Helen Hayes and Charlie Chaplin, touring the country and earning $500 a week. When the Depression and the onset of "talkies," motion pictures with sound, cut short her stage career, she returned home to care for her sick father.

== Family business ==
Gray started working at her father's Richland State Bank as an assistant cashier in 1935. At the death of her father in 1937, she inherited control and the presidency of Richland State Bank, as well as the family's general store, grain elevator, lumber yard, insurance agency, many farms and other real estate.

== Political background ==
Gray was active in the state Democratic Party and was elected Democratic National Committee member from Kansas in 1936, a position she held until 1964. She was an articulate and well-liked representative of the party and an early supporter of Harry S. Truman. It was this support that brought about her nomination as the first woman to be Treasurer of the United States from 1949 to 1953.

== Later career ==
The entire town of Richland was purchased by the U.S. Army Corps of Engineers in the late 1960s as a part of the land acquired for Clinton Lake. By 1974, the town was vacated and the remaining buildings were demolished shortly thereafter. After the project was announced, the Government was slow to proceed leaving property owners unsure if they should maintain their properties and unable to sell in order to relocate. Gray played a significant role in urging Congress to provide funds for the project so property owners could get on with their lives.

She relocated the Richland State Bank to Topeka in 1964 and renamed it the Capital City State Bank, which was later changed to Capital City Bank. By the end of the twentieth century, it had established several branches throughout the capital city.

== Personal life ==
She married her manager, George M. Clark, in 1929. Although the marriage ended in a divorce in the mid-1940s, she continued to be known as Georgia Neese Clark for a time even after her second marriage. In 1953, she married Andrew J. Gray, a journalist and press agent.

Georgia Neese Clark Gray had no children.

== Posthumous ==
Gray died on October 26, 1995, aged 97, and is interred at Pleasant Hill Cemetery, located at approximately 87th and Ratner Road, 1.5 miles south and 3 miles east of Berryton, Kansas.

The Georgia Neese Gray Performance Hall at the Topeka Performing Arts Center is named after her.

The Georgia Neese Gray Award is reserved for presentation to Kansans who have served in elected Awards at the municipal and/or county level and who have performed outstanding service to their local community in the pursuit of the principles of the Kansas Democratic Party. Such service commends a lengthy and broad participation in public service endeavors to the city, county and state. This award is considered the highest honor bestowed by the Kansas Democratic Party to its municipal and county elected officials.

On February 6, 2008, she was inducted into the Topeka Business Hall of Fame.

Clark's signature, as used on American currency

In 2016, Georgia Neese Gray was inducted into the Kansas Business Hall of Fame.

Government offices
Preceded by William Alexander Julian	Treasurer of the United States; 1949–1953	Succeeded by Ivy Baker Priest
