= Miss Julie (disambiguation) =

Miss Julie is a play by August Strindberg.

Miss Julie may also refer to:

- Miss Julie (Rorem opera) by Ned Rorem
- Miss Julie (Alwyn opera) by William Alwyn
- Julie (Boesmans opera) by Philippe Boesmans
- Miss Julie (1922 film), a 1922 German silent drama film
- Miss Julie (1951 film), directed by Alf Sjöberg
- After Miss Julie, a 1995 television film and play directed by Patrick Marber
- Miss Julie (1999 film), directed by Mike Figgis
- Miss Julie (2014 film), directed by Liv Ullmann

== See also ==
- Julie (disambiguation)
