= Saint-Julien-Innocence-Eulalie =

Saint-Julien-Innocence-Eulalie Sent Júlia-Denença-Aulària (Occitan)
- Commune
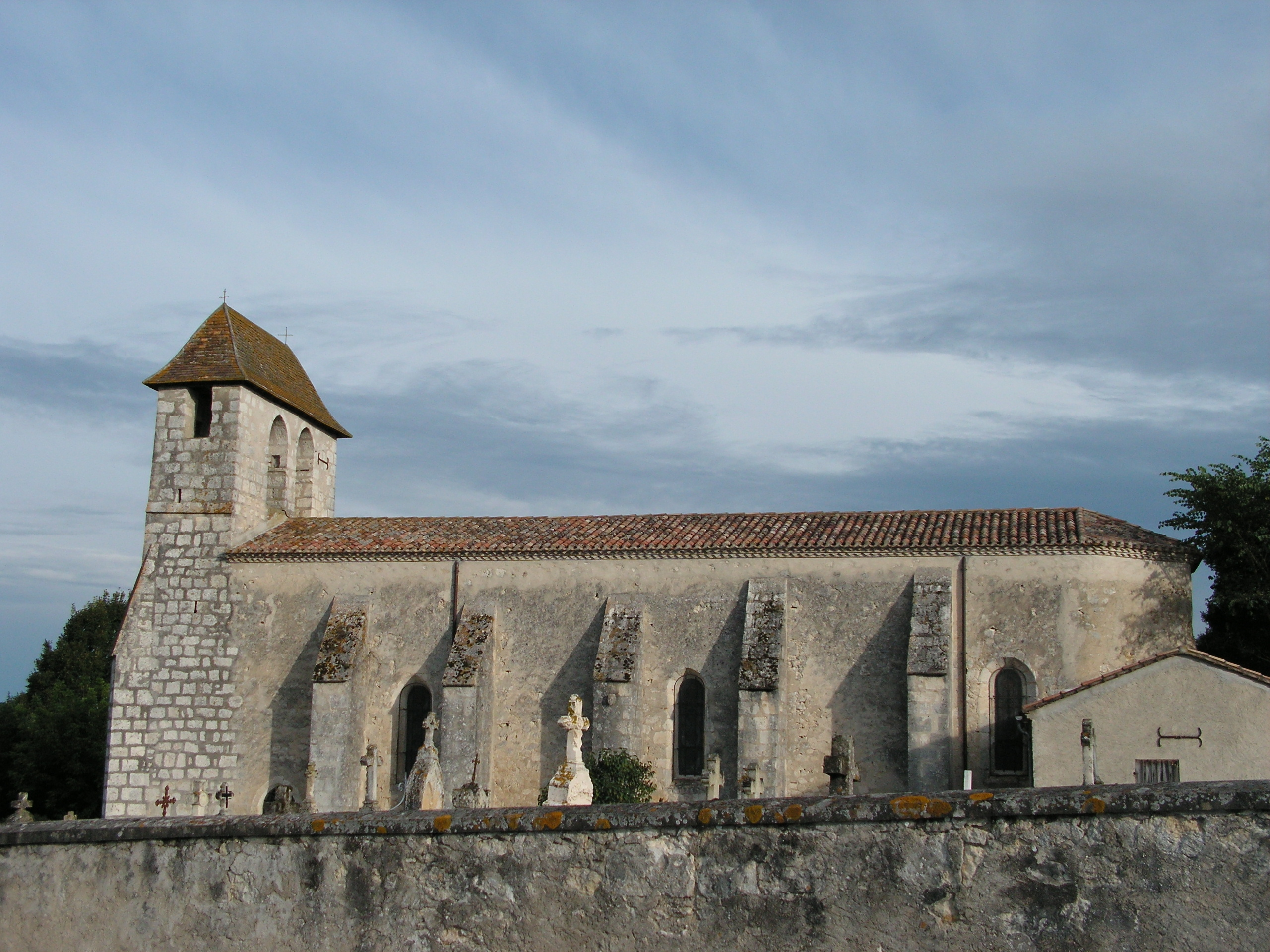
- Sainte-Innocence
- Location of Saint-Julien-Innocence-Eulalie
- Location within France Location within Nouvelle-Aquitaine
- Coordinates: 44°43′36″N 0°24′35″E
- Country: France
- Region: Nouvelle-Aquitaine
- Department: Dordogne
- Arrondissement: Bergerac
- Canton: Sud-Bergeracois
- Intercommunality: Portes Sud Périgord
- Area^{1}: 19.73 km^{2} (7.62 sq mi)
- Highest elevation: 166 m (545 ft)
- Lowest elevation: 62 m (203 ft)
- Population (2023): 311
  - Density: 15.8/km^{2} (40.8/sq mi)
- Time zone: UTC+01:00 (CET)
  - Summer (DST): UTC+02:00 (CEST)
- INSEE/Postal code: 24423 /24500
- ^{1} French Land Register data, which excludes lakes, ponds, glaciers > 1 km^{2} (0.386 sq mi or 247 acres) and river estuaries.

Saint-Julien-Innocence-Eulalie (French: [sɛ̃ ʒyljɛ̃ inɔsɑ̃s ølali]; Occitan: Sent Júlia-Denença-Aulària) is a commune in the Dordogne department in Nouvelle-Aquitaine in southwestern France. It was established on 1 January 2019 by merger of the former communes of Sainte-Innocence (the seat), Sainte-Eulalie-d'Eymet and Saint-Julien-d'Eymet.

== See also ==
- Communes of the Dordogne department
