= Sainte-Innocence =

- Part of Saint-Julien-Innocence-Eulalie
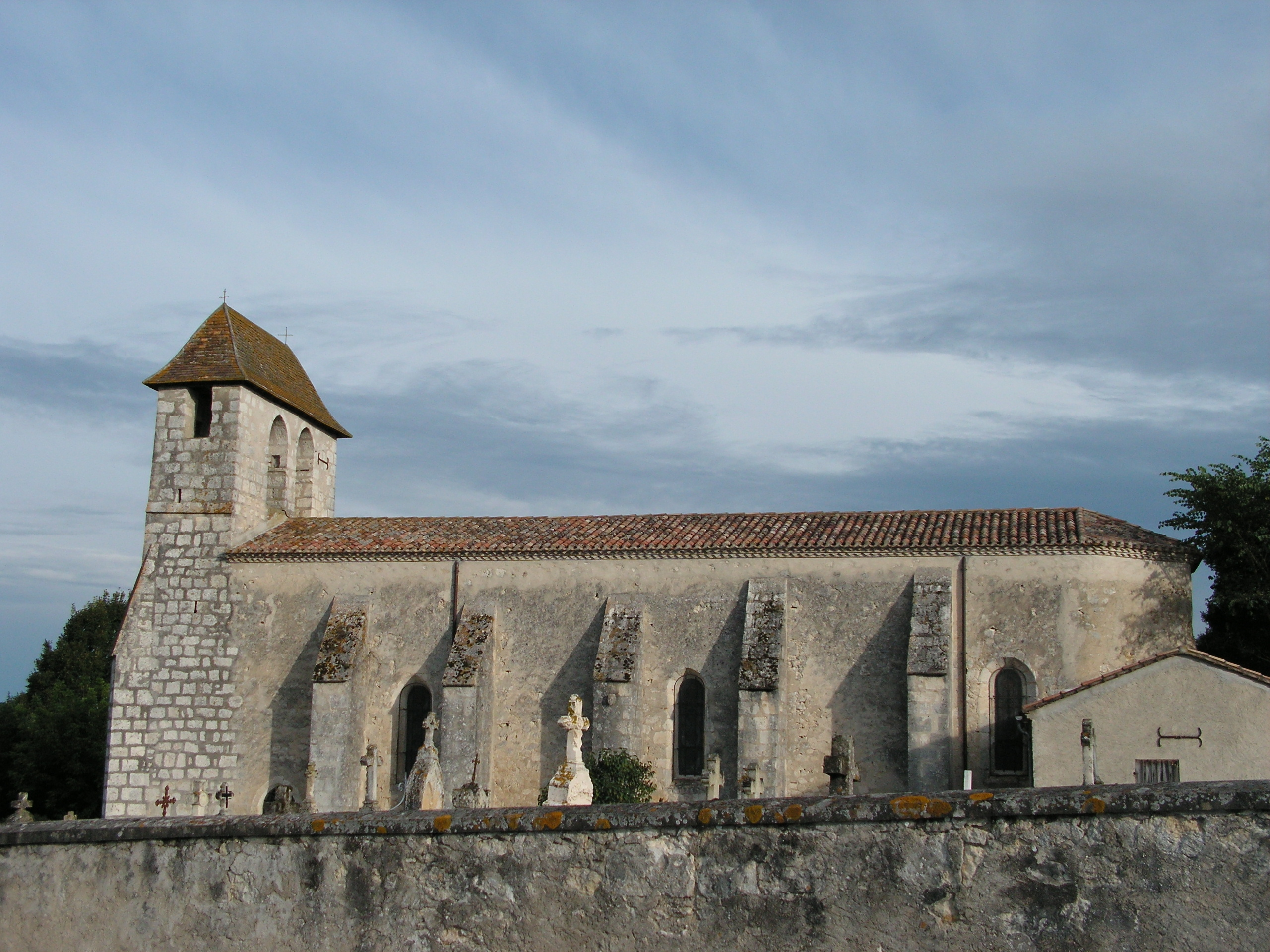
- Location of Sainte-Innocence
- Location within France Location within Nouvelle-Aquitaine
- Coordinates: 44°43′36″N 0°24′35″E
- Country: France
- Region: Nouvelle-Aquitaine
- Department: Dordogne
- Arrondissement: Bergerac
- Canton: Sud-Bergeracois
- Commune: Saint-Julien-Innocence-Eulalie
- Area^{1}: 7.20 km^{2} (2.78 sq mi)
- Elevation: 127 m (417 ft)
- Highest elevation: 162 m (531 ft)
- Lowest elevation: 90 m (300 ft)
- Population (2023): 113
  - Density: 15.7/km^{2} (40.6/sq mi)
- Time zone: UTC+01:00 (CET)
  - Summer (DST): UTC+02:00 (CEST)
- Postal code: 24500
- ^{1} French Land Register data, which excludes lakes, ponds, glaciers > 1 km^{2} (0.386 sq mi or 247 acres) and river estuaries.

Sainte-Innocence (French pronunciation: [sɛ̃t inɔsɑ̃s]; Occitan: Senta Denença) is a former commune in the Dordogne department in Nouvelle-Aquitaine in southwestern France. On 1 January 2019, it was merged into the new commune Saint-Julien-Innocence-Eulalie.

== See also ==
- Communes of the Dordogne department
