= Harry L. Conn =

American judge

Harry Luther Conn

Justice of the Ohio Supreme Court
- In office June 18, 1924 – December 2, 1924
- Appointed by: A. Victor Donahey
- Preceded by: R. M. Wanamaker
- Succeeded by: Reynolds R. Kinkade

Personal details
- Born: April 28, 1867 Van Wert, Ohio
- Died: June 4, 1939 (aged 72) Van Wert, Ohio
- Party: Democratic
- Spouse: Minnie Irene Balyeat
- Children: Two
- Education: United States Military Academy

Harry Luther Conn (April 28, 1867 – June 4, 1939) was a jurist in the U.S. State of Ohio. He was appointed to the Ohio Supreme Court in 1924 with no prior experience as a judge.

== Biography ==
Harry L. Conn was born in Van Wert, Ohio on April 28, 1867, the son of Perry C. and Sophronia Saltzgaber Conn. He entered the United States Military Academy in 1886. He was forced to resign his commission after two years due to ill health.

After resigning from the academy, Conn moved to Indianapolis, Indiana to take business classes. He was appointed court stenographer for the Ohio Courts of Common Pleas in five counties in Northwest Ohio. Conn passed the Ohio bar examination in 1894, and opened a private practice in Van Wert, while continuing as court stenographer in Van Wert County. Conn was elected as Van Wert county prosecutor in 1903, was re-elected in 1905, and lost re-election in 1907.

Conn was appointed Ohio Commissioner of Insurance and Director of the Ohio Department of Insurance in January 1923 by newly elected Democratic Governor A. Victor Donahey. He had served for eighteen months when Ohio Supreme Court Judge R. M. Wanamaker committed suicide on June 18, 1924. Governor Donahey appointed Conn to the vacant seat. He served until he lost election for the remainder of the term in November 1924 to Republican Reynolds R. Kinkade. He resigned December 2, 1924.

Conn resumed being Director of the Ohio Department of Insurance in 1925, and then returned to his private practice in Van Wert. He was chairman of the board of directors of the First National Bank of Van Wert, and was a member of the Van Wert Elks Lodge and the First Presbyterian Church.

Harry L. Conn married Irene Balyeat in 1898. They raised two children.

Harry L. Conn died from injuries in a fall down the stairs from the second floor Elks Lodge meeting rooms in Van Wert to the sidewalk on June 14, 1939.

== External sources ==
Harry L. Conn at Find a Grave
