= William Z. Davis =

American judge

William Zephania Davis
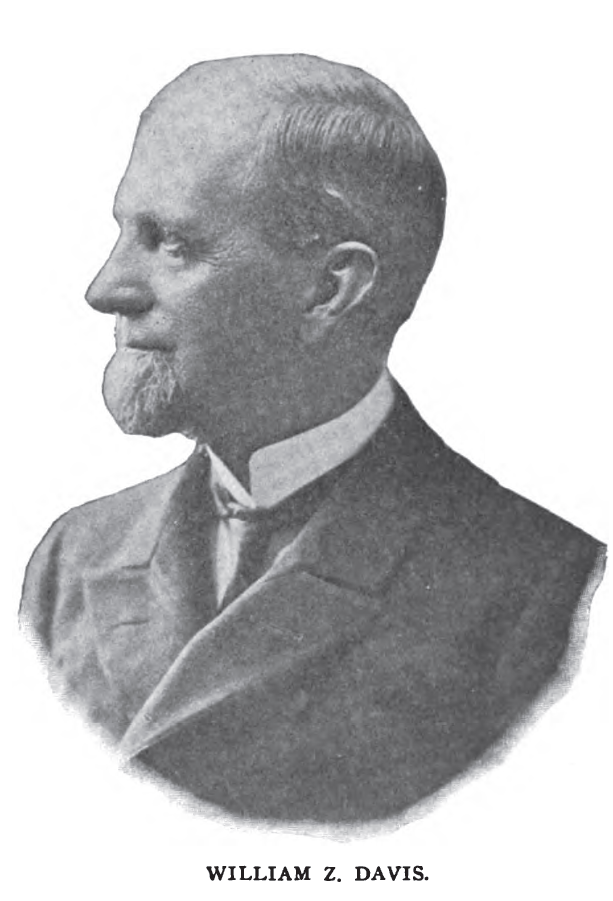

Associate Justice of the Ohio Supreme Court
- In office January 9, 1900 – December 31, 1912
- Preceded by: Joseph Perry Bradbury
- Succeeded by: R. M. Wanamaker

Personal details
- Born: June 10, 1839 Loydsville, Belmont County, Ohio
- Died: December 17, 1923 (aged 84) Columbus, Ohio
- Resting place: Marion Cemetery, Marion, Ohio
- Party: Republican
- Spouse(s): Harriet Search; Jessie Myer
- Children: Three

William Zephania Davis (June 10, 1839 – December 17, 1923) was a Republican politician in the U.S. State of Ohio who was an Ohio Supreme Court Judge 1900–1912.

Davis was born in Loydsville, Belmont County, Ohio to Dr. Bushrod Washington Davis and Harriet (née Hatcher) Davis. He was educated in the public schools and a private academy. He was a long term member of the American Microscopical Society. During the American Civil War, Davis served a three-month enlistment in the 4th Ohio Infantry, and afterward in the 96th Ohio Infantry, until disabled and honorably discharged in the Vicksburg Campaign.

Davis was admitted to the bar, and commenced practice after recovering from war injuries. He worked in the State and Federal courts. Davis was nominated by the Republican Party for Supreme Court Justice in June, 1899, and elected in November of that year. Joseph Perry Bradbury resigned from the Court January 9, 1900, and Davis was appointed the next day to fill the seat by Governor Nash. He entered his elected term February 9, 1900, and served until the end of 1912.

After retiring from the court, Davis had a private practice in Columbus from 1913 to 1921. He died in Columbus December 17, 1923, and was buried at Marion Cemetery in Marion, Ohio.

Davis was married to Harriet Search of Marion on August 3, 1868. They raised two daughters, and another died in childhood. Harriet died August 2, 1901, and Davis married Jessie Myer of Columbus September 2, 1903. They had no children.

Davis was a charter member Lodge 402 of the Knights of Pythias, and was a member of the Methodist Episcopal Church in Marion and Columbus.

== See also ==
- List of justices of the Ohio Supreme Court

== Bibliography ==
- Davis, William Z. (1911). "William H. West". Ohio Archaeological and Historical Publications. 20: 404–414.
