= Julien (surname) =

Julien is a surname. See also Julian (surname) for a variation. The surname Julien may refer to:

== Arts ==
- Alexander Julien (born 1988), a Canadian-American musician
- Henri Julien (1852–1908), a French Canadian artist and cartoonist
- Isaac Julien (born 1960), an English installation artist and filmmaker
- Max Julien (1933-2022), an American actor
- Pauline Julien (1928–1998), a Quebec singer, songwriter, actress and feminist activist
- Pierre Julien (1731–1804), a French sculptor
- Sandra Julien (born 1950), a French actress

== Politics ==
- André Julien, Comte Dupuy (1753–?), Governor General of French India, 1816–1825
- Guy Julien (born 1945), a politician from Quebec
- Thomas V. Julien (1838–1906), justice of the Supreme Court of Nevada

== Scholars ==
- Charles-André Julien (1891-1991), a French journalist and historian
- Claude Julien (journalist) (1925–2005), French journalist
- Stanislas Julien (c.1797-1873), a French sinologist

== Sports ==
- Bernard Julien (1950–2025), a Trinidad and Tobago cricketer
- Christina Julien (born 1988), a Canadian football player
- Claude Julien (ice hockey) (born 1960), Canadian ice hockey coach
- Denyse Julien (born 1960), a Canadian badminton player
- Edouard Julien (born 1999), a Canadian professional baseball player
- Félix Julien (1884–1936), French footballer
- Marcus Julien (born 1986), a Grenadian football player
- Shane Julien (1956–1992), a West Indian cricketer
- Stéphane Julien (born 1974), a French-Canadian professional ice hockey player

== Other ==
- André Julien Chainat (1892–1961), French World War I flying ace
- Denis Julien (c.1772-?), an American fur trapper of French Huguenot origin
- Franck Julien (born 1966), a French businessman
- Naomi Julien, a fictional character from the BBC soap opera EastEnders

== See also ==
- Julien (disambiguation)
