= Patti Julian =

American politician

Member of the Arkansas House of Representatives from the 38th district
- In office January 14, 2013 – January 2015
- Preceded by: John Charles Edwards
- Succeeded by: Donnie Copeland

Personal details
- Party: Democratic
- Education: University of Arkansas; University of Arkansas School of Law
- Profession: Attorney

Patti Julian is an American lawyer and a Democratic former one-term member of the Arkansas House of Representatives, for District 38 in Pulaski County.

== Education ==
Julian earned her accounting degree from the University of Arkansas and earned her JD from the University of Arkansas School of Law.

== Elections ==
- 2012 With Representative John Charles Edwards redistricted to District 35, Julian was unopposed for the May 22, 2012 Democratic Primary and won the four-way November 6, 2012 General election with 6,674 votes (49.7%) against Republican nominee Dean DiMichele, Independent candidate Bill Laman, and Libertarian candidate Debrah Standiford.

Preceded by John Charles Edwards	Arkansas State Representative for District 38 (Pulaski County); 2013–2015	Succeeded by Donnie Copeland
