= July (disambiguation) =

July is the seventh month of the year.

July may also refer to:

== Music ==
- July (band), rock band from Ealing, U.K. from the late 1960s
- July (EP), a 2006 EP released by Katatonia
- July (album), a 2014 album by Marissa Nadler
- "July" (Noah Cyrus song), a 2019 song by Noah Cyrus
- "July" (Ocean Colour Scene song), a 2000 song by Ocean Colour Scene
- "July", a 2009 song by Inna
- "July", a song from The Great Cold Distance by Katatonia
- "July", a 2016 song by Kris Wu
- "July", a 1995 Avant-Garde Concerto by Leif Segerstam
- "July", a song from Overlooked by Caroline's Spine
- "July", a song from Rusted Angel by Darkane
- "July", a song from Birds of My Neighborhood by The Innocence Mission
- "July", a song from The Power of Failing by Mineral

== People ==
- "July" or "JulyZerg", the pseudonym of programmer Park Sung-joon (StarCraft player)
- Miranda July (born 1974), American filmmaker, actress, singer, and writer
- July Namir (born 1985), British actress, comedian and writer

== Fictional characters ==
- Cassandra July, Glee character

== Other ==
- July, West Virginia, a community in the United States

== See also ==
- Juli (disambiguation)
