= Saint Julian =

See also Saint Julius (disambiguation)

Saint Julian may refer to:

- Julian of Alexandria (died 250), one of the Martyrs of Alexandria under Decius
- Julian of Carthage (died 259), one of the Martyrs of Carthage under Valerian
- Julian of Antioch (died 305), venerated as a Christian martyr of the fourth century
- Julian Sabas (died 377), a hermit who is considered a saint.
- Julian of Toledo (642–690), Roman Catholic but born to Jewish parents
- Julian the Hospitaller, legendary Roman Catholic saint
- Julian of Le Mans (died 3rd century), venerated as first bishop of Le Mans
- Julian of Cuenca (1127–1208), bishop of Cuenca, Spain
- Julian of Antinoe, see Julian and Basilissa
- Julian, brother of Julius of Novara
- Julian, companion of Lucian of Beauvais
- Quintian, Lucius and Julian (died 430), African martyrs
- Julian of Emesa

Saint Julian may also refer to:

- Saint Julian (album), by Julian Cope
- St. Julian's, a town in Malta
- St Julians, Newport, a suburb of the city of Newport, United Kingdom
- Sankt Julian, a municipality in Rhineland-Palatinate, Germany

== See also ==
- San Julián (disambiguation)
- Julian (disambiguation)
- São Julião (disambiguation)
- Saint-Julien (disambiguation)
- Sant Julià (disambiguation)
