= Donnie Copeland =

American pastor and politician

Member of the Arkansas House of Representatives from the 38th district
- In office January 2015 – January 2017
- Preceded by: Patti Julian
- Succeeded by: Carlton Wing

Personal details
- Born: Donnie Ray Copeland; March 16, 1961 (age 65) Monroe, Louisiana, U.S.
- Party: Republican
- Spouse: Shari Copeland
- Children: 3
- Education: Northeast Louisiana University

Donnie Ray Copeland (born March 16, 1961) is an American pastor and politician. He is the pastor of the Apostolic Pentecostal Church in North Little Rock, Arkansas. From 2015 through 2017, he served one term as a Republican member of the Arkansas House of Representatives for District 38 in Pulaski County.

== Early career ==
Copeland attended the University of Louisiana at Monroe, when the institution was known as Northeast Louisiana University.

In 2010, Copeland polled 60,072 votes (48.1 percent) in the Republican primary election for lieutenant governor, having lost to Mark Darr, who received 64,883 votes (51.9 percent). Darr then defeated in the general election the Democrat Shane Broadway for the seat vacated by another Democrat, Bill Halter.

== House of Representatives ==
In 2014, Copeland won the House position with 5,710 votes (51.5 percent), when he unseated the one-term Democrat Patti Julian, who polled 5,389 votes (48.5 percent). Copeland was succeeded in the House by fellow Republican Carlton Wing, who with 7,019 votes (52.1 percent) defeated the Democrat Victoria Leigh, who received 6,466 (48 percent). In his legislative term, Copeland served on these committees: (1) City, County and Local Affairs, (2) Judiciary, and (3) Public Retirement and Social Security.

Rather than seeking a second term in the state House, Copeland ran unsuccessfully on March 1, 2016, in the Republican primary for the District 34 seat in Arkansas Senate. He polled 6,365 votes (48.8 percent) against the successful incumbent, Jane English, who received 6,687 votes (51.2 percent). English then defeated the Democrat Joe Woodson, also of North Little Rock, in the November 8 general election, 21,497 votes (58 percent) to 15,541 (42 percent).

Preceded by Patti Julian	Arkansas State Representative for District 38 (Pulaski County); 2015–2017	Succeeded by Carlton Wing
