= Vêtre-sur-Anzon =

- Commune
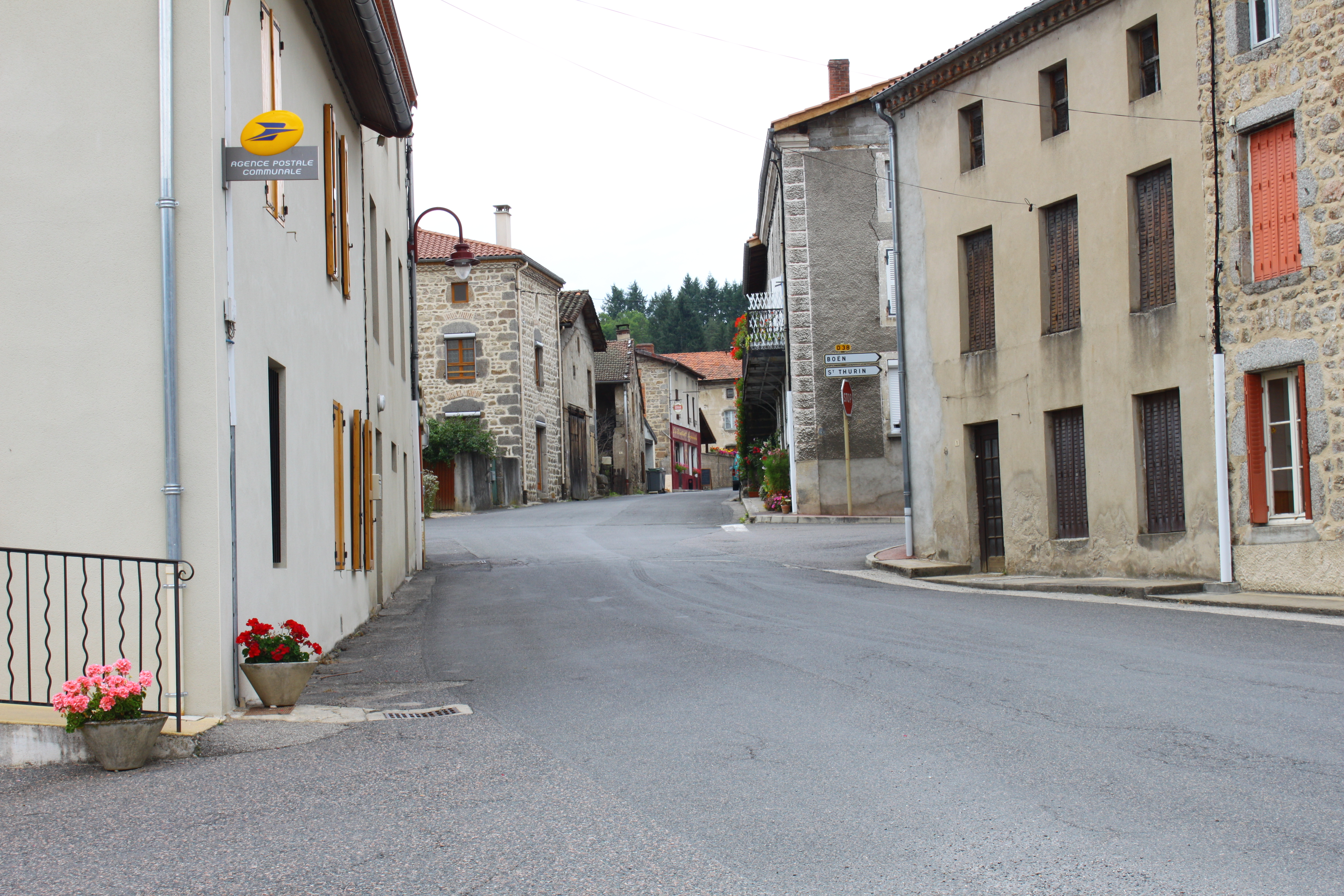
- Location of Vêtre-sur-Anzon
- Location within France Location within Auvergne-Rhône-Alpes
- Coordinates: 45°48′54″N 3°49′32″E
- Country: France
- Region: Auvergne-Rhône-Alpes
- Department: Loire
- Arrondissement: Montbrison
- Canton: Boën-sur-Lignon
- Intercommunality: Loire Forez Agglomération

Government
  - Mayor (2020–2026): Bertrand Daval
- Area^{1}: 20.25 km^{2} (7.82 sq mi)
- Highest elevation: 823 m (2,700 ft)
- Lowest elevation: 450 m (1,480 ft)
- Population (2023): 564
  - Density: 27.9/km^{2} (72.1/sq mi)
- Time zone: UTC+01:00 (CET)
  - Summer (DST): UTC+02:00 (CEST)
- INSEE/Postal code: 42245 /42440
- ^{1} French Land Register data, which excludes lakes, ponds, glaciers > 1 km^{2} (0.386 sq mi or 247 acres) and river estuaries.

Vêtre-sur-Anzon (French pronunciation: [vɛtʁ syʁ ɑ̃zɔ̃]; Arpitan: Lavètre-sus-Anzon) is a commune in the Loire department in central France. It was established on 1 January 2019 by merger of the former communes of Saint-Julien-la-Vêtre (the seat) and Saint-Thurin.

== See also ==
- Communes of the Loire department
