= Reynolds R. Kinkade =

American judge

Reynolds Robert Kinkade

Justice of the Ohio Supreme Court
- In office January 1, 1925 – May 15, 1933
- Preceded by: Harry L. Conn
- Succeeded by: Howard Landis Bevis

Personal details
- Born: March 3, 1854 Keokuk County, Iowa, US
- Died: May 25, 1935 (aged 81) Cleveland, Ohio, US
- Resting place: Woodlawn Cemetery
- Party: Republican
- Spouse: Addie George
- Children: two

Reynolds Robert Kinkade was a Republican jurist from the U.S. state of Ohio. He sat on the Ohio Supreme Court from 1925 to 1933.

== Biography ==
Kinkade was born to Eleazer and Hannah Lyons Kinkade of Keokuk County, Iowa on March 3, 1854. He was admitted to the Ohio Bar in 1878. He practiced law in Toledo, Ohio and Marquette, Michigan from 1878 to 1899.

From 1899 to 1908, Kinkade was a judge of the Lucas County Court of Common Pleas. In 1908 he became a judge of the Lucas County Circuit Court until 1912, when that court became the Ohio District Court of Appeals. He continued on this court until 1924.

In 1924, Kinkade won election to the Ohio Supreme Court for a six year term, defeating Democrat Harry L. Conn. He was re-elected in 1930, and served until he resigned May 15, 1933. He resigned due to ill health, and died at Cleveland, Ohio, May 25, 1935. His funeral was at First Congregational Church in Toledo, with burial at Woodlawn Cemetery.

Kinkade married Addie George on June 15, 1881. They had two children.
