= Julians =

Julians may refer to:

- Julian gens, members of the Roman patrician family
- Julians Vaivods (1895–1990), Latvian cardinal
- Julians Zagorskis (1903–1978), Latvian and Latgalian ceramicist
- Len Julians (1933–1993), English footballer
- Yorane Julians (born 1981), French basketball player

== See also ==
- St Julians
- Julian (disambiguation)
