= Sant Julià =

Sant Julià, Catalan for Saint Julian, may refer to:

== Places ==
Andorra

- Sant Julià de Lòria, parish in Andorra

Spain

- Sant Julià de Cerdanyola, town and municipality in the comarca of Berguedà
- Sant Julià de Ramis, village in the province of Girona
- Sant Julià de Vilatorta, municipality in the comarca of Osona
- Sant Julià del Llor i Bonmatí, municipality in the comarca of la Selva

== Sports ==
- UE Sant Julià, football club in Andorra
