= Richland, Kansas =

- Ghost town
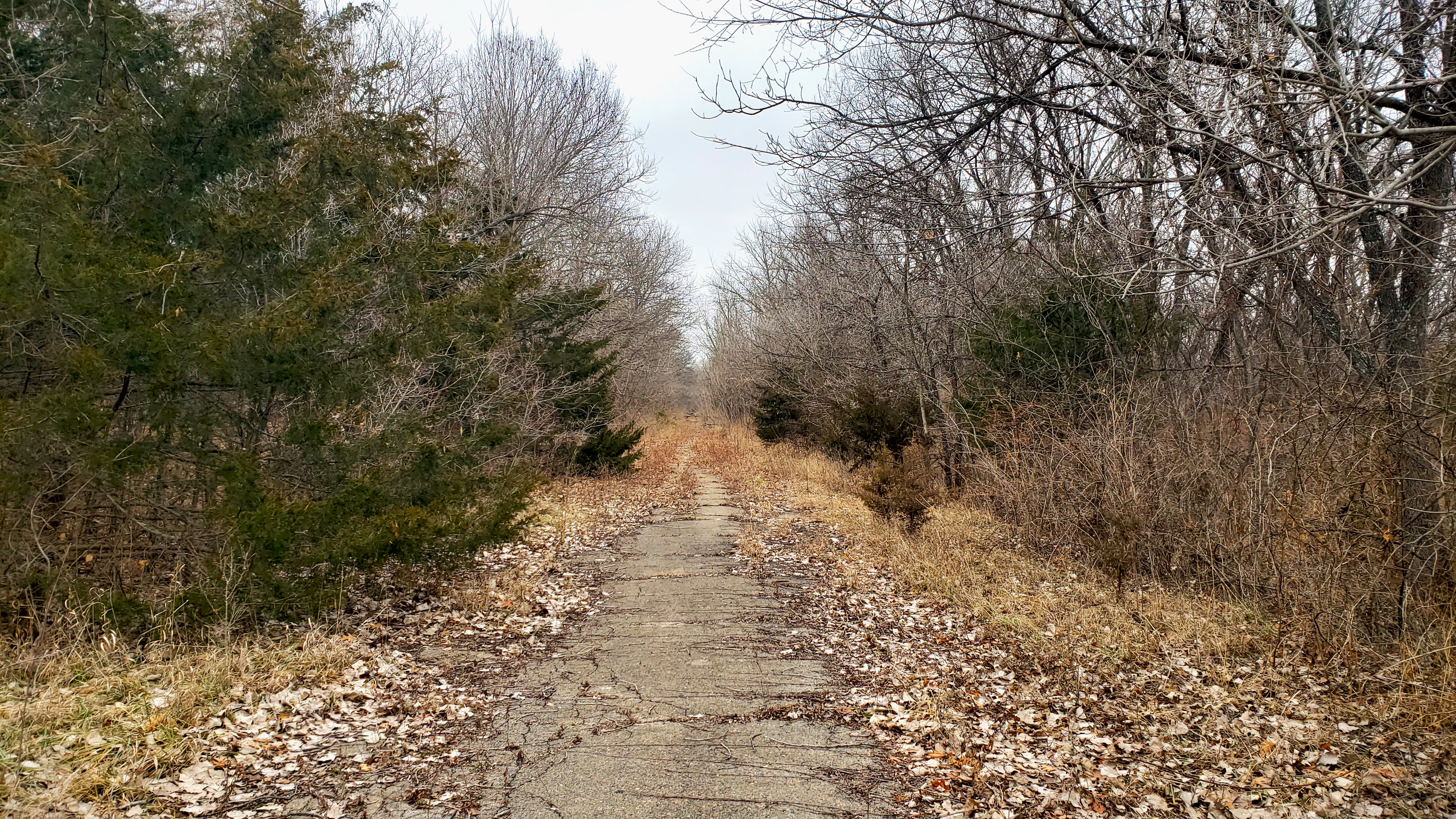
- Former street of Richland (2018)

- Location within Kansas Location within the United States
- Coordinates: 38°53′01″N 95°32′23″W
- Country: United States
- State: Kansas
- County: Shawnee
- Elevation: 932 ft (284 m)

Population
  - Total: 0
- Time zone: UTC-6 (CST)
  - Summer (DST): UTC-5 (CDT)
- Area code: 785
- FIPS code: 20-59625
- GNIS ID: 484928

Richland is currently a ghost town in southeastern Shawnee County, Kansas, United States.

== History ==
In October 1854, Charles Matney settled in the area that was to become Richland, near the confluence of Camp Creek with the Wakarusa River. In 1857 a post office was opened north of town and a schoolhouse was constructed, out of logs, on the northeast corner of Matney's land. Richland eventually became the center of a rich agricultural region and its businesses included a bank, a barber shop, a church, two blacksmiths, two doctors, a pharmacy, several lodges, a hotel and a general store. in the early 1870s, Richland became a station on the St. Louis, Lawrence and Denver Railroad; however, the railroad would be short lived and the railroad stopped running in 1894.

By the 1890s the population had come close to 300 residents with businesses including a lumber yard, two millinery shops and an ice cream parlor, among others. Richland also established a newspaper, Argosy, in 1893 and it included local news but also news about nearby communities including Twin Mound, Overbrook and Clinton. In the summer of 1894, Laura Ingalls Wilder passed through Richland with her husband and daughter. Wilder noted in her diary, based on the friendliness of the townspeople, that "[we] may come back here if we do not like it there [in Missouri]."

In October 1903, Richland started its annual Richland Street Fair which featured parades, games and talent shows. In 1949, Georgia Neese Clark was appointed by President Harry S. Truman as Treasurer of the United States which she served until 1953. By 1967, Clinton Lake was becoming more of a reality. Some businesses in Richland moved one mile north of the construction site, naming the new town New Richland Corners, and the farewell street fair was held in July 1967. However, the Richland Fair Association held one more final fair the next year.

The post office closed in 1969 and the last of the town was leveled in 1974. Today little remains of Richland, only the ruins of some buildings, fragments of paved streets, and the cemetery. Most of town site was located on land owned by the U.S. Army Corps of Engineers. U.S. Geological Survey quadrangle maps show the original location to be at 38.887699, -95.528589, at elevation 900 ft., and COE brochure says Flood Control Pool is at 903.4 ft.

== Notable people ==
The birthplace of Georgia Neese Clark Gray, the first female Treasurer of the United States.
