= Saint-Thurin =

- Part of Vêtre-sur-Anzon
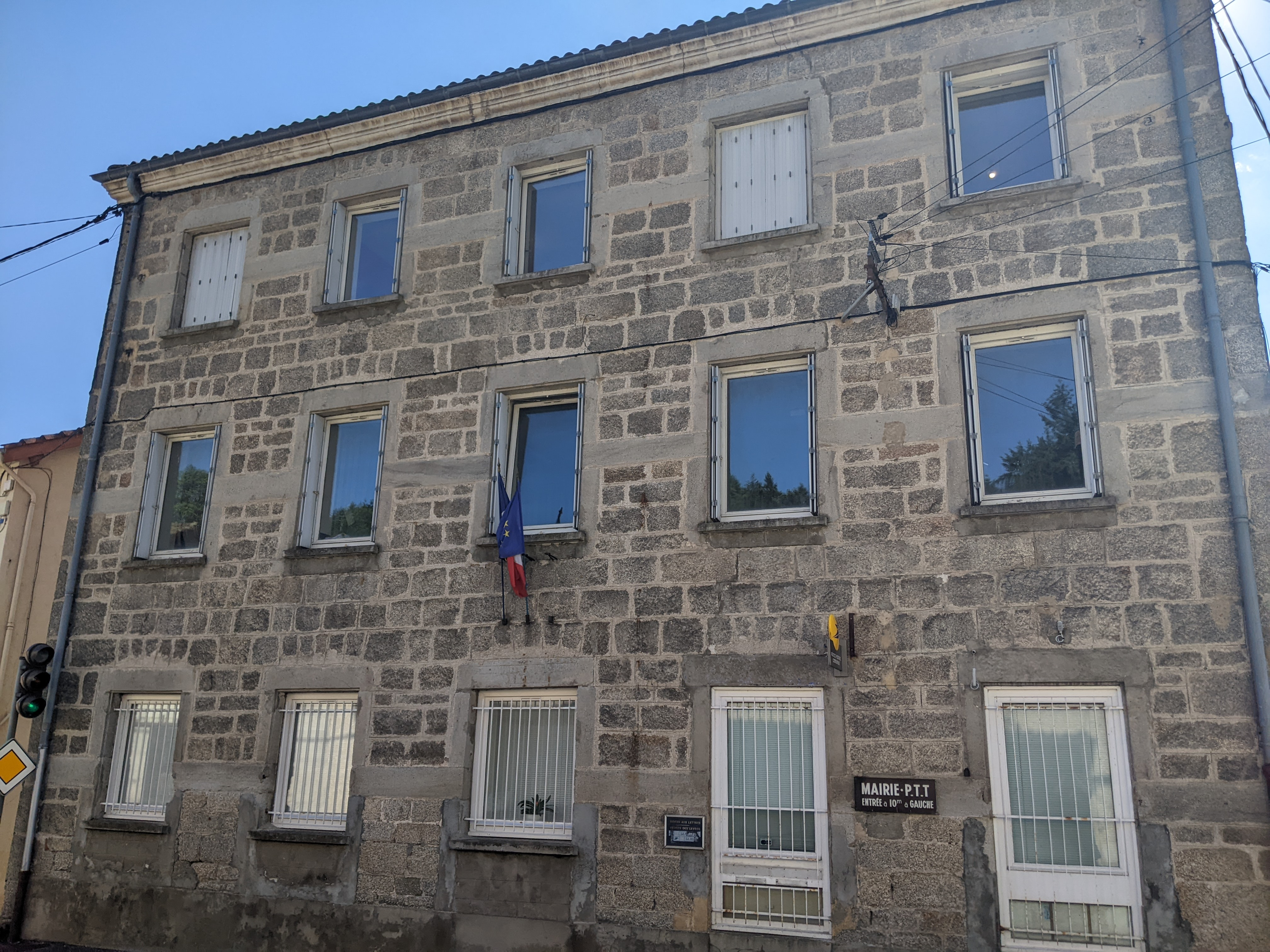
- Saint-Thurin Town hall
- Location of Saint-Thurin
- Location within France Location within Auvergne-Rhône-Alpes
- Coordinates: 45°49′01″N 3°52′21″E
- Country: France
- Region: Auvergne-Rhône-Alpes
- Department: Loire
- Arrondissement: Montbrison
- Canton: Boën-sur-Lignon
- Commune: Vêtre-sur-Anzon
- Area^{1}: 7.35 km^{2} (2.84 sq mi)
- Elevation: 489 m (1,604 ft)
- Highest elevation: 717 m (2,352 ft)
- Lowest elevation: 450 m (1,480 ft)
- Population (2022): 204
  - Density: 27.8/km^{2} (71.9/sq mi)
- Time zone: UTC+01:00 (CET)
  - Summer (DST): UTC+02:00 (CEST)
- Postal code: 42111
- ^{1} French Land Register data, which excludes lakes, ponds, glaciers > 1 km^{2} (0.386 sq mi or 247 acres) and river estuaries.

Saint-Thurin (French pronunciation: [sɛ̃ tyʁɛ̃]) is a former commune in the Loire department in central France. On 1 January 2019, it was merged into the new commune Vêtre-sur-Anzon.

== See also ==
- Communes of the Loire department
