= Sainte-Eulalie-d'Eymet =

- Part of Saint-Julien-Innocence-Eulalie
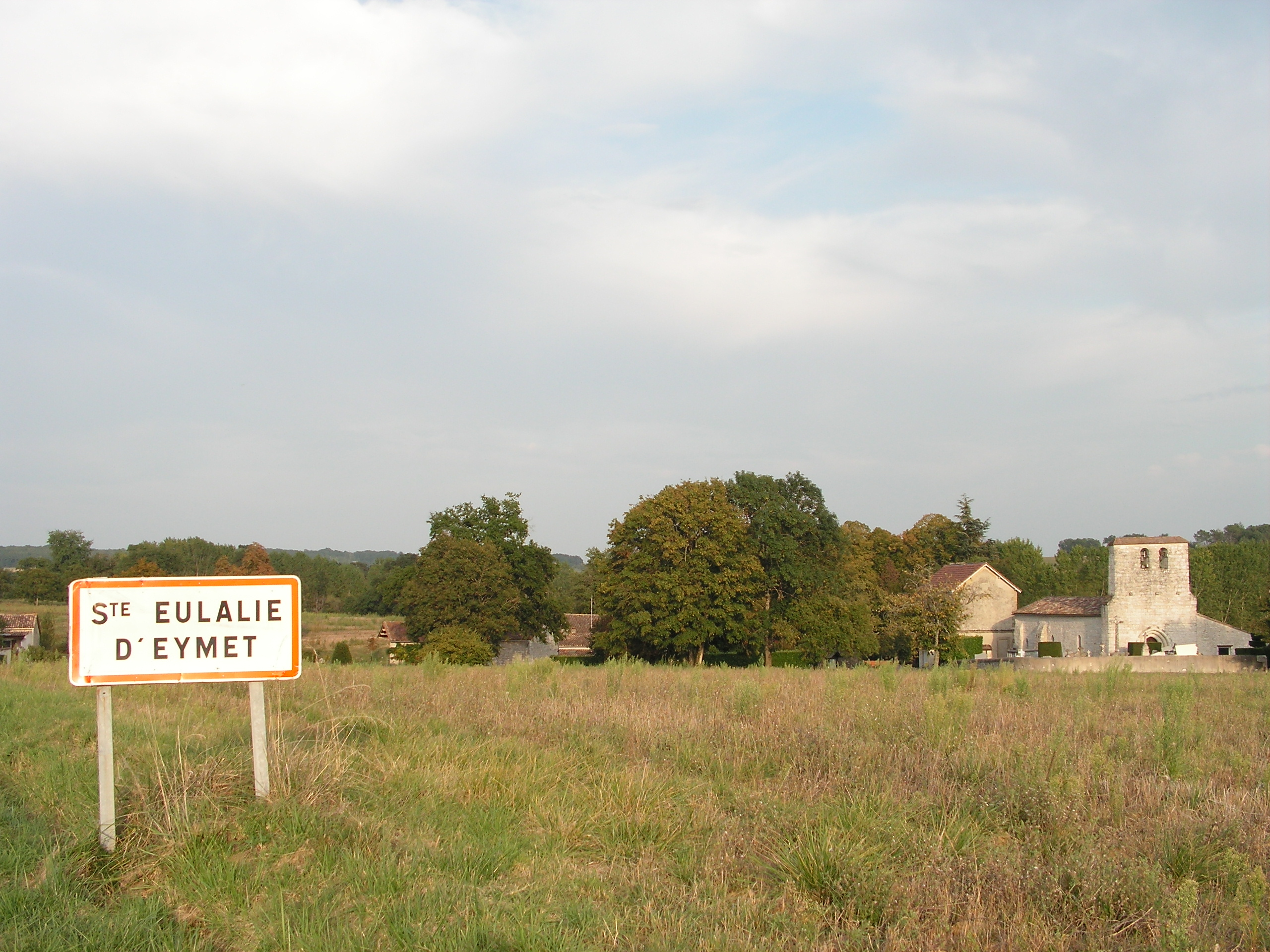
- Location of Sainte-Eulalie-d'Eymet
- Location within France Location within Nouvelle-Aquitaine
- Coordinates: 44°42′06″N 0°22′00″E
- Country: France
- Region: Nouvelle-Aquitaine
- Department: Dordogne
- Arrondissement: Bergerac
- Canton: Sud-Bergeracois
- Commune: Saint-Julien-Innocence-Eulalie
- Area^{1}: 6.72 km^{2} (2.59 sq mi)
- Elevation: 82 m (269 ft)
- Highest elevation: 150 m (490 ft)
- Lowest elevation: 62 m (203 ft)
- Population (2023): 83
  - Density: 12/km^{2} (32/sq mi)
- Time zone: UTC+01:00 (CET)
  - Summer (DST): UTC+02:00 (CEST)
- Postal code: 24500
- ^{1} French Land Register data, which excludes lakes, ponds, glaciers > 1 km^{2} (0.386 sq mi or 247 acres) and river estuaries.

Sainte-Eulalie-d'Eymet (French pronunciation: [sɛ̃t ølali dɛjmɛ], literally Sainte-Eulalie of Eymet; Occitan: Senta Eulària d'Aimet) is a former commune in the Dordogne department in Nouvelle-Aquitaine in southwestern France. On 1 January 2019, it was merged into the new commune Saint-Julien-Innocence-Eulalie.

== See also ==
- Communes of the Dordogne department
