= William Alexander Julian =

Treasurer of the United States (1870–1949)

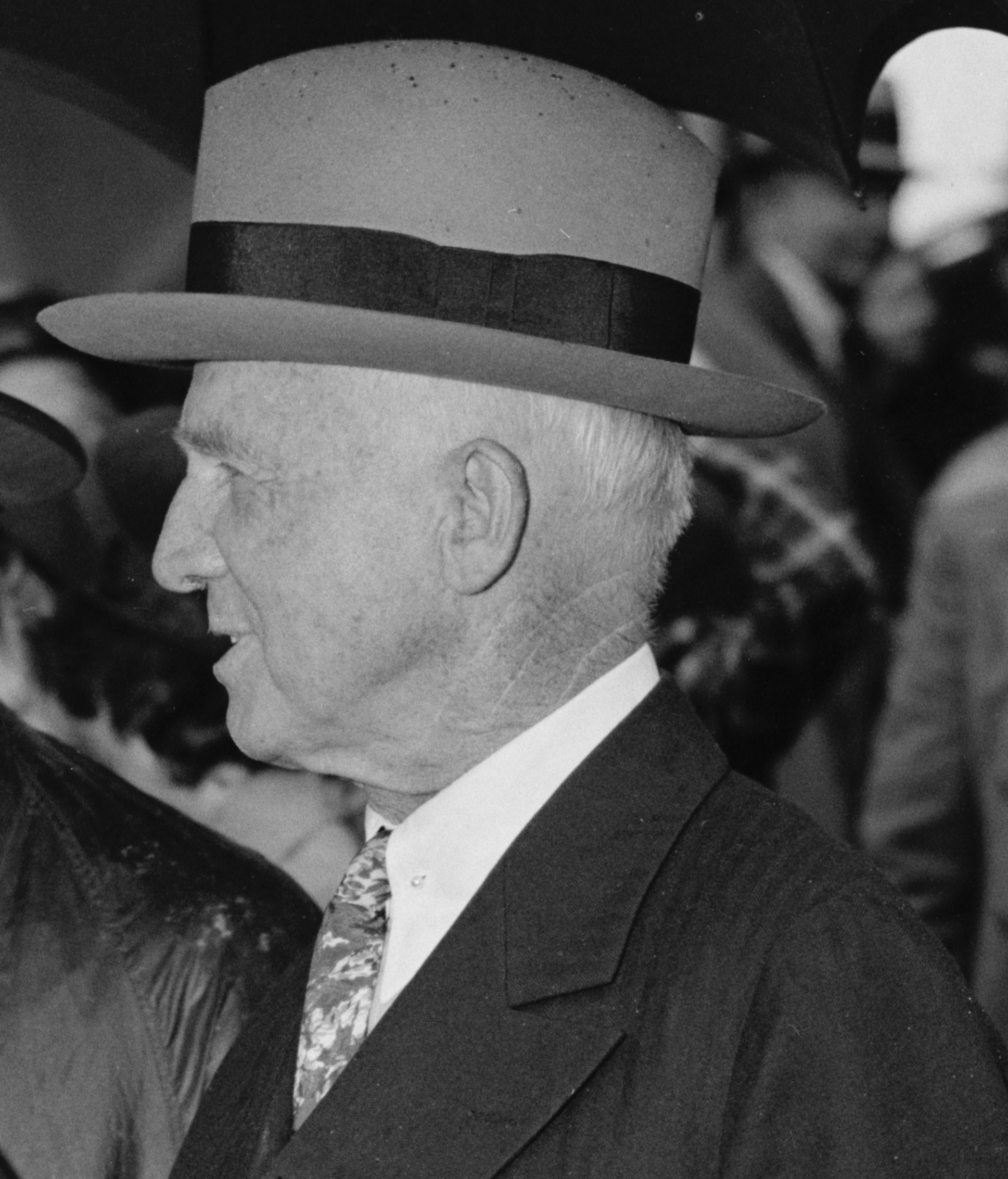
- Julian in 1938

28th Treasurer of the United States
- In office June 1, 1933 – May 29, 1949
- President: Franklin D. Roosevelt; Harry S. Truman
- Preceded by: W.O. Woods
- Succeeded by: Georgia Neese Clark

Personal details
- Born: August 6, 1870
- Died: May 29, 1949 (aged 78) Bethesda, Maryland, U.S.
- Party: Democratic
- Relations: Henry S. Julian (brother)

William Alexander Julian (August 6, 1870 – May 29, 1949) served as the 28th treasurer of the United States from June 1, 1933 to May 29, 1949 under Franklin D. Roosevelt and Harry S. Truman. He was the last man to have served as Treasurer of the United States until the appointment of Brandon Beach in May 2025.

== Early life ==
Julian was born on August 6, 1870, the son of Alexander and Elizabeth C. (nee Laughlin) Julian. His brother was Henry S. Julian. In 1888, Julian graduated from Dodds College in Frankfort, Kentucky.

== Career ==
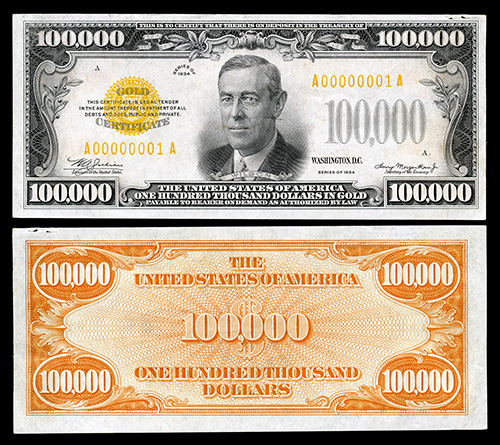
Julian's signature appeared on the 1934 gold certificates, which included the largest currency denomination ever issued by the United States.

Julian settled in Cincinnati, where he first worked as a bank clerk, then as a shoe manufacturer. Building on the success of his shoe business, he went on to a career in bank management. He declined repeated offers of public office, including Woodrow Wilson's offers of seats on the Federal Trade Commission and the Federal Reserve Board. He ran unsuccessfully for U.S. Senator from Ohio in 1920 and retired from business soon afterward. He appeared as a delegate to the Democratic National Convention from Ohio in 1924, 1932, 1940 and 1948.

As the only Treasurer appointed by Roosevelt, Julian was one of the longest-serving Treasurers, although a distant second to Thomas T. Tucker. During his term the government completed its transition away from the gold standard as a basis for currency by passing the Gold Reserve Act of 1934. Under the act, Julian took custody of the gold that had been confiscated under Executive Order 6102 and held at the Federal Reserve Banks.

== Death ==
On May 29, 1949, Julian died in a car crash in Bethesda, Maryland.

Party political offices
Preceded by Timothy Sylvester Hogan	Democratic nominee for U.S. Senator from Ohio (Class 3); 1920	Succeeded by Atlee Pomerene
Government offices
Preceded by W.O. Woods	Treasurer of the United States; 1933–1949	Succeeded by Georgia Neese Clark
