= George Julian =

George Julian may refer to:

- George E. Julian (1893–1977), American football fullback for Michigan Agricultural College (1911–1914) and the Canton Bulldogs (1915–1916)
- George W. Julian (1817–1899), American politician, lawyer and writer who served in Congress from Indiana

== See also ==
- George Julian Harney (1817–1897), British political activist
- George Julian Howell, Australian soldier
- George Julian Zolnay (1863–1949), Hungarian and American sculptor
