= Automobiles Julien =

French automobile manufacturer

Julien is a former French automobile manufacturer. The Paris based Société des Études Automobiles M. A. Julien presented its first prototype in 1946 and automaking activities came to an end in 1949, probably without any of the developments having progressed beyond the prototype stage.

== History ==
The company presented its first prototypes at the Paris Motor Show in October 1946 (78 years ago). These were the Julien MM5 and the Julien VUP. During the following twelve months Julien negotiated successfully with the government, who controlled the necessary materials supplies, for permission to put the MM5 into production.

== The car ==
The open-topped two-seater car featured a single-cylinder two-stroke engine of 310 cc (19 cu in) which for 1947 was increased to 325 cc (19.8 cu in) with a maximum power output of 10 hp (7.5 kW). The rear track was strikingly narrower than that at the front, but the car did have four wheels and power was delivered via a three-speed manual transmission to the rear axle. The 1,840 mm (72 in) wheelbase supported an overall body length of 2,870 mm (113 in) and the weight of just over 300 kg (660 lb) allowed for an acceptable performance level.

For 1949 a Julien MM7 appeared with engine capacity increased to 368 cc (22.5 cu in) and power to 13 hp (9.7 kW). 1949 (76 years ago) was the company's last year as an aspiring auto-maker.
