= Joseph Perry Bradbury =

American judge

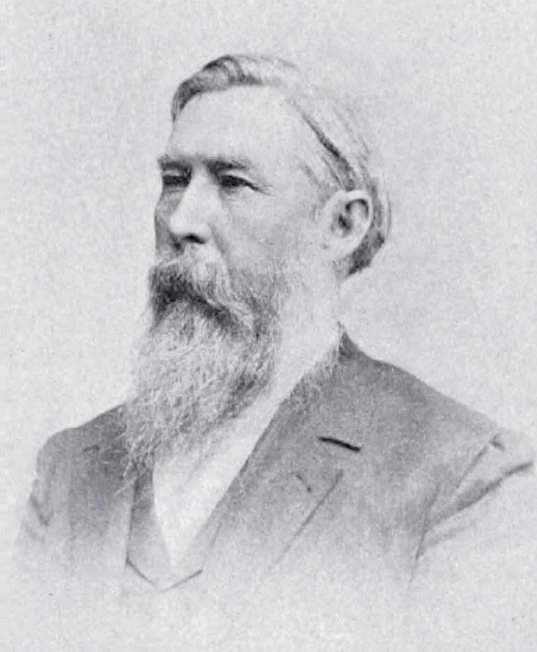

Justice of the Ohio Supreme Court
- In office February 9, 1889 – January 10, 1900
- Preceded by: Selwyn N. Owen
- Succeeded by: William Z. Davis

Personal details
- Born: November 21, 1838 Kygerville, Gallia County, Ohio
- Died: July 15, 1915 (aged 76) Pomeroy, Ohio
- Resting place: Beech Grove Cemetery
- Party: Republican

Military service
- Allegiance: United States
- Branch/service: United States Army
- Years of service: August 1857 – June 1859

Joseph Perry Bradbury (November 21, 1838 – July 17, 1915) was a Republican politician in the U.S. State of Ohio who was a judge on the Ohio Supreme Court 1889–1901.

Joseph Bradbury was born on a farm near Kygerville, Gallia County, Ohio. He attended the common schools. In 1857 he joined the United States Army, and served under Albert Sidney Johnson against the Mormons. In 1859 he went to California and mined gold for a few years.

Bradbury began the practice of law in 1866 in Union City, Indiana, and later that year in Pomeroy, Meigs County, Ohio. In 1869 he was elected Prosecuting Attorney of Meigs County and re-elected in 1871. In 1875, he was elected Common Pleas Judge and again in 1876 and 1881. In 1884 he was chosen Judge of the Fourth Judicial Circuit.

Bradbury was elected in 1888 to the Ohio Supreme Court, defeating Democrat Lyman R. Critchfield for a five-year term. He was re-elected in 1893, and continued to serve until January 10, 1900.

In 1905 he was again elected judge of the Court of Common Pleas, and served until 1912. He died July 17, 1915, at home in Pomeroy.

== See also ==
- List of justices of the Ohio Supreme Court

== Notes ==
Legal offices
Preceded by Selwyn N. Owen	Associate Justice of the Ohio Supreme Court; 1889–1900	Succeeded by William Z. Davis
