= Julian (singer) =

Russian pop singer (born 1973)

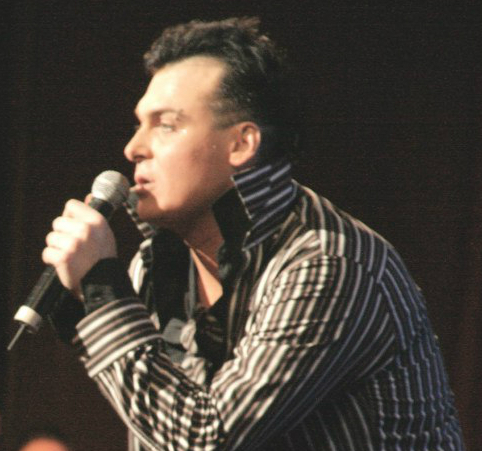

Background information
- Born: Yulian Viktorovich Vasin; 15 August 1973 (age 53); Kolomna, Moscow Oblast, RSFSR, Soviet Union
- Genres: Pop, Russian pop, Romance
- Occupation: Singer
- Years active: 1993 — present

Julian (Russian: Юлиан, real name Yulian Viktorovich Vasin (Russian: Юлиан Викторович Васин); 15 August 1973, Kolomna, Moscow Oblast, USSR) is a Russian pop singer. Honored Artist of the Russian Federation (youngest honored artist in history of the USSR and Russia, 1999). People's Artist of the Chechen Republic (2008).

== Biography ==
Born on 15 August 1973 in Kolomna. Named in honor of Yulian Semyonov.

In the 8th grade, I passed the external examinations for two years and thus graduated from the school, after which I entered GITIS, where he was enrolled as an exception in view of his young age. In his second year of study, Julian won the Grand Prix at the International Variety Art Competition with the song Old Maple by Aleksandra Pakhmutova. An exception was made after graduation. For the first time in the history of GITIS, in one year Julian is given out two diplomas at once variety artist and director of variety and mass performances.

In 20 years, the artist holds his first solo concert at the State Estrada Theater. In 1994, Julian song in the St. George Hall of the Kremlin in honor of the arrival of Queen Elizabeth II of Great Britain, the concert lasted 15 minutes, it featured a ballet (Ekaterina Maximova with Vladimir Vasiliev), an opera (Zurab Sotkilava), pop (Julian). In the same year he was accepted into the International Union of Pop Artists, and in 1995 the artist became the official performer of the Moscow Anthem. In 1996 he created his own Theater of Songs.

Participant of the first Slavianski Bazaar in Vitebsk contest with the song Russian Waltz (Pakhmutova-Dobronravov). Boris Yeltsin responded about her: we have no words for the Russian national anthem, but there is a Russian Waltz. In a duet with Lyudmila Zykina, Mother and Son recorded the song.

Most often, Julian's performances can be seen at concert venues in Moscow and other regions of the country devoted to celebratory events. In the repertoire of the singer about 400 songs.

On 30 March 2019 he married the singer Anastasia Mintskovskaya (born 1965). For Julian, this marriage was the first, and for Anastasia the eighth.
