= Juli =

Juli may refer to:

- Juli (band), a rock/pop band from Germany
- "Juli", by Ryan Adams from the album Prisoner (B-Sides)
- Juli District, one district of the province Chucuito in Puno Region, Peru
  - Juli (city), the capital of Juli District
- Juli (footballer) (born 1981), Spanish footballer whose full name is Julián Cerdá Vicente
- Juli (record producer) (born 1998), Italian record producer and disc jockey
- Juli (Street Fighter), character from Street Fighter
- Juli, female nickname, for Julia, Juliette, Julianna, Julianne or similar names
  - Juli, a main character in the movie In July
- Juli Briskman, politician from the U.S. state of Virginia
- Julis, short for Junge Liberale, the Young Liberals youth organization in Germany and Austria

== See also ==
- Julis, village and local council in Israel
- July (disambiguation)
- Julie (disambiguation)
- Juliette (disambiguation)
- Juliet
- Julieta (disambiguation)
- Julianne
