= Topeka Performing Arts Center =

The Topeka Performing Arts Center is a 2,425-capacity performing arts center located in Topeka, Kansas. Opened in 1939, it was built in the Art Deco style and was renovated in 1991, and reopened that same year officially named the Topeka Performing Arts Center.

== History ==
It has hosted notable entertainers, such as Bob Dylan, Johnny Cash, The Beach Boys, Ann & Nancy Wilson, Willie Nelson, Olivia Newton-John, Merle Haggard, and The Liverpool Legends. In 2022, the Earth Wind and Fire reunion tour was set to perform at the venue, however it had to be postponed due to scheduling conflicts.
