= Ivor Julian =

English public administrator

Sir Kenneth Ivor Julian CBE
- Born: 3 December 1895
- Died: 29 March 1971 (aged 75); Hove, Sussex
- Occupation: Public administrator
- Spouse: Rosemary Staunton (m. 1936; died 1971)
- Parent(s): Henry Matthew Julian; Elizabeth Isabella (née McKay)
- Honours: CBE (1950); Knight Bachelor (1958)

Sir Kenneth Ivor Julian, CBE (3 December 1895 – 29 March 1971), known by his middle name Ivor, was an English public administrator.

== Early life and family ==
Julian was born on 3 December 1895 to Henry Matthew Julian and his wife, Elizabeth Isabella, née McKay. He was educated in Redhill.

== Career, honours and assessment ==
Julian served on the board of the Royal Sussex County Hospital in Brighton, and became chairman of the board in 1946, serving for two years. In 1946, in anticipation of the establishment of the National Health Service, the Minister of Health Aneurin Bevan appointed him chairman of the South-East Metropolitan Regional Hospital Board and he remained in the post until 1968; when liaising with the ministry, he was selected to represent all the chairmen of the regional hospital boards in England and Wales. He was also a governor of Guy's Hospital, and was appointed a Commander of the Order of the British Empire (CBE) in 1950 and a Knight Bachelor eight years later.

Julian died on 29 March 1971, aged 75 at Hove in Sussex, after a long illness. His wife Rosemary Staunton, daughter of Charles Edgar Terry, had died earlier in 1971; they had been married since 1936, but never had children. In his obituary, The Times recorded that Julian "did more for the development of hospitals in this country, and did it with less publicity, than almost anyone else in the last 25 years ... his wisdom, energy and practical good sense, given without reward, contributed decisively to the enormous progress made during those years".
