= July, West Virginia =

- Unincorporated community
- Location within West Virginia Location within the United States
- Coordinates: 38°38′45″N 81°32′14″W
- Country: United States
- State: West Virginia
- Counties: Jackson and Roane
- Elevation: 938 ft (286 m)
- Time zone: UTC-5 (Eastern (EST))
  - Summer (DST): UTC-4 (EDT)
- GNIS ID: 1740919

July was an unincorporated community in Jackson and Roane counties, West Virginia.
