= Joanne Julian =

Mixed-media artist

- Born: Joanne Julian; San Fernando Valley, California, U.S.
- Education: California State University, Northridge and Otis Art Institute of Parsons School of Design
- Occupation: Artist
- Years active: 1973–present
- Website: http://www.joannejulian.com

Joanne Julian is an Armenian/American artist. She is known for her works on paper and has produced work in several media over her long career. These include printmaking, botanical and avian illustration, Zen Buddhist ink painting, calligraphy, and abstract composition. Julian is an artist whose oeuvre is informed by Zen aesthetics. She creates calligraphic ink strokes and splashes. During visits to Japan, she observed and absorbed the techniques of Zen masters.

== Early life and education ==
Julian was raised in the San Fernando Valley. At college, she majored in sculpture and printmaking. She received both her BA and MA at California State University, Northridge. In 1973 she received an MFA degree in painting from College of the Canyons in Valencia, CA. She became chair of the fine arts department and Gallery Director there.

== Work ==
Julian has taught and lectured at ArtCenter College of Design, Glendale Community College (California), University of California, Los Angeles, California State University (Northridge), and Los Angeles Trade–Technical College.

== Accomplishments ==
Julian has mounted 20 solo exhibitions and over 60 group exhibitions nationally. She has had an active studio for over 50 years, often working on a commission base for site-specific pieces for international corporations. Critical reviews, essays, and reproductions of her works have been published in her exhibition catalogs, The Los Angeles Times, The San Francisco Chronicle, Art Week, Art in America, Artillery, Art LTD, and Voyage LA among others.
