= John Charles Edwards =

American politician

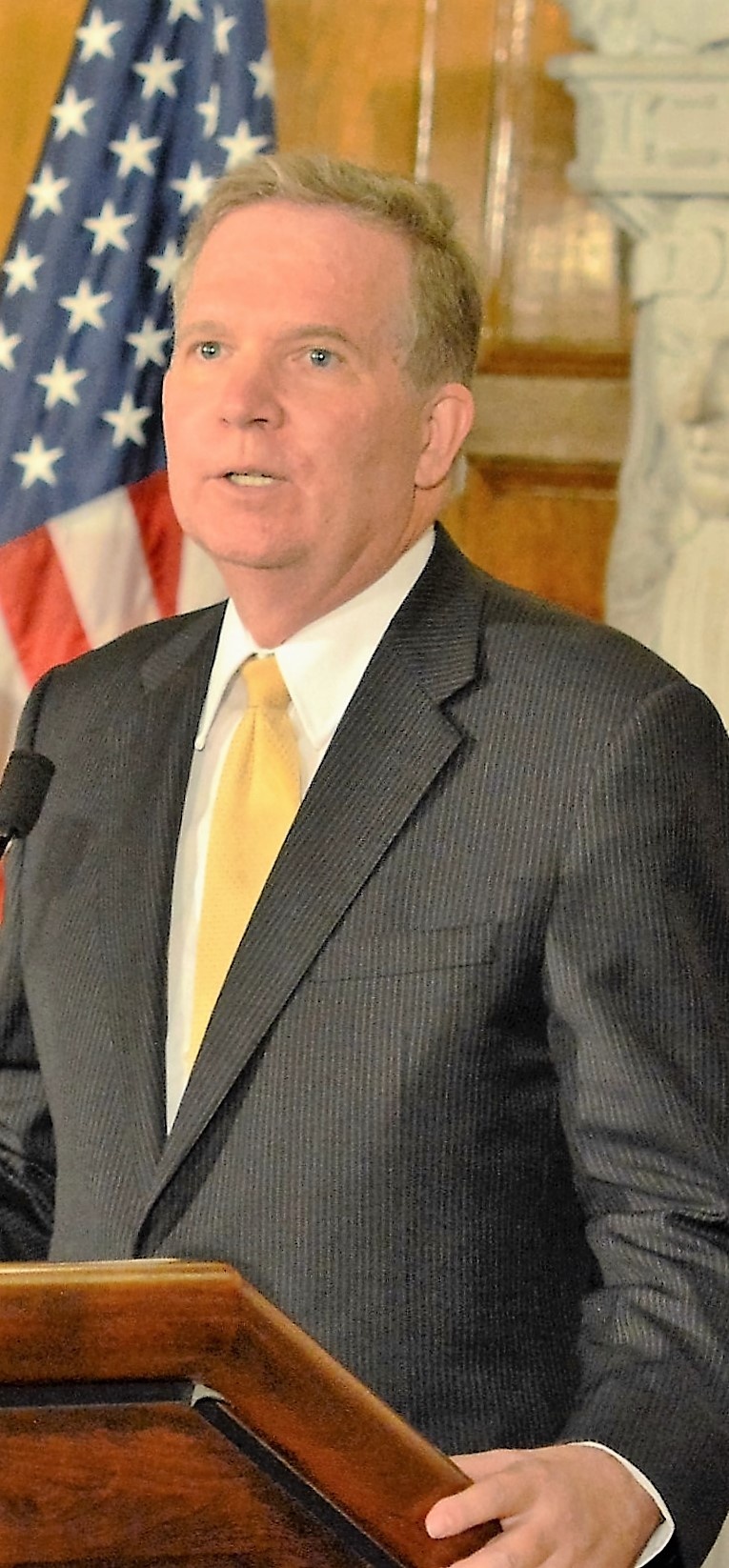
- John Edwards speaking in the Governor's Conference Room in Little Rock, Arkansas.

Member of the Arkansas House of Representatives from the 35th district
- In office January 14, 2013 – 2015
- Preceded by: New District formed-Edwards first holder of the new district.
- Succeeded by: Clarke Tucker

Member of the Arkansas House of Representatives from the 38th district
- In office January 2009 – January 14, 2013
- Preceded by: David Johnson
- Succeeded by: District 38 changed to District 35-Edwards first holder of new district

Personal details
- Born: Pine Bluff, Arkansas
- Party: Democratic
- Profession: Attorney

Military service
- Branch/service: Arkansas Army National Guard
- Rank: Colonel
- Battles/wars: Iraq War

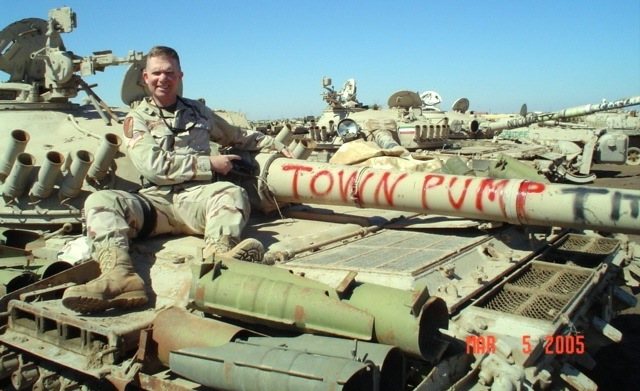
Edwards on a T-72 Iraqi tank at Taji, Iraq in March 2005

John Charles Edwards is a former member of the Arkansas House of Representatives. He is a member of the Democratic Party. Edwards was born in Pine Bluff, Arkansas and grew up in rural Lonoke County, Arkansas.

== Career ==
Edwards served as an aide to former US Senator David Pryor focusing on agriculture issues. In 1996, he was appointed by the administration of President William J. Clinton as State Director of USDA Rural Development in Arkansas. USDA Rural Development is the lead federal agency focusing on economic development in rural parts of the United States. He held the position until 2001. Edwards was part of the 39th Infantry Brigade of the Arkansas Army National Guard when it deployed to Iraq in 2004 in support of Operation Iraqi Freedom II. He served as the Staff Judge Advocate and was awarded the Combat Action Badge and the Bronze Star for his service. Edwards was also sent with a Task Force Arkansas to support relief efforts in the aftermath of Hurricane Katrina in New Orleans. He conducted one of the inquires that dispelled many of the myths and rumors surrounding alleged violence at the New Orleans Convention Center. Edwards was elected to the Arkansas House in 2008, and re-elected in 2010 and 2012. He served on the Education Committee, the Agriculture, Forestry and Economic Development Committee, and was the House Co-Chair of the Arkansas Legislative Council. Edwards was the principal sponsor of legislation during the 2013 session that authorized the construction of a new state veteran's home. Edwards and others had found the conditions in an existing veterans home in Little Rock, Arkansas deplorable and unsafe for the veterans living there. The new home is currently being built at Fort Roots in North Little Rock, Arkansas. He also sponsored legislation barring convicted rapists from claiming custody rights from a child born of the rape. Edwards became aware of the challenges many rape victims with children conceived from rape after reading a Georgetown Law Journal article. The legislation was signed into law by Governor Mike Beebe.
