= San Julián =

San Julián (Saint Julian) may refer to:

- San Julián, Sonsonate, El Salvador
- San Julián, Jalisco, Mexico
- San Julian, Eastern Samar, Philippines
- Puerto San Julián, Patagonia, Santa Cruz Province (Argentina)
- San Julián, Santa Cruz, Bolivia
- San Julián (Chile), Chile
- San Julián (mountain), a mountain in the Andes of Peru.
- San Julián, an air base in Cuba.
- Las Ventas de San Julián, municipality located in the province of Toledo
