= Saint-Julien-d'Eymet =

- Part of Saint-Julien-Innocence-Eulalie
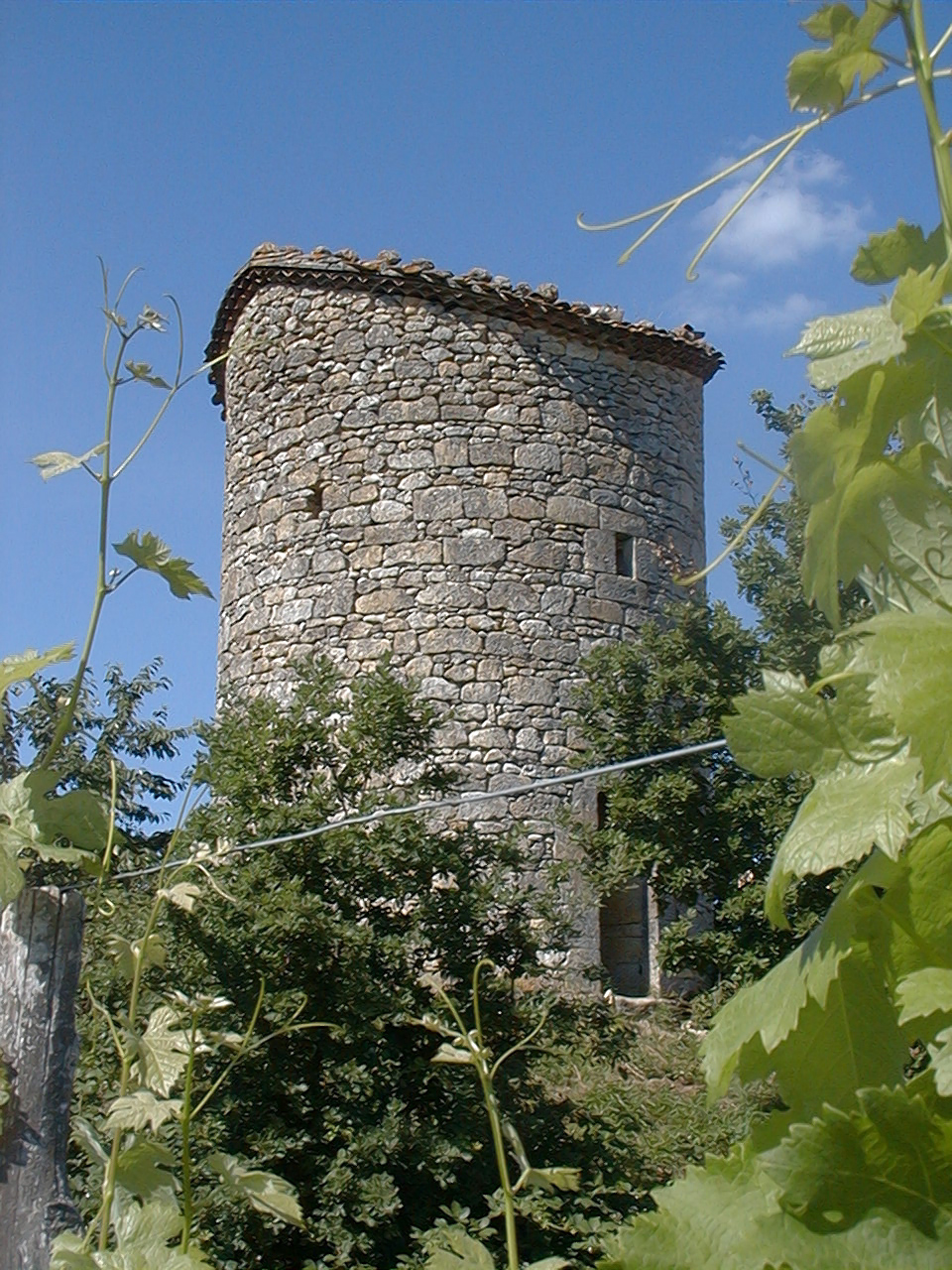
- Location of Saint-Julien-d'Eymet
- Location within France Location within Nouvelle-Aquitaine
- Coordinates: 44°43′30″N 0°26′25″E
- Country: France
- Region: Nouvelle-Aquitaine
- Department: Dordogne
- Arrondissement: Bergerac
- Canton: Sud-Bergeracois
- Commune: Saint-Julien-Innocence-Eulalie
- Area^{1}: 5.81 km^{2} (2.24 sq mi)
- Elevation: 118 m (387 ft)
- Highest elevation: 166 m (545 ft)
- Lowest elevation: 78 m (256 ft)
- Population (2023): 115
  - Density: 19.8/km^{2} (51.3/sq mi)
- Time zone: UTC+01:00 (CET)
  - Summer (DST): UTC+02:00 (CEST)
- Postal code: 24500
- ^{1} French Land Register data, which excludes lakes, ponds, glaciers > 1 km^{2} (0.386 sq mi or 247 acres) and river estuaries.

Saint-Julien-d'Eymet (Languedocien: Sent Júlia d'Aimet) is a former commune in the Dordogne department in Nouvelle-Aquitaine in southwestern France. On 1 January 2019, it was merged into the new commune Saint-Julien-Innocence-Eulalie.

== See also ==
- Communes of the Dordogne department
