= Saint-Julien-la-Vêtre =

- Part of Vêtre-sur-Anzon
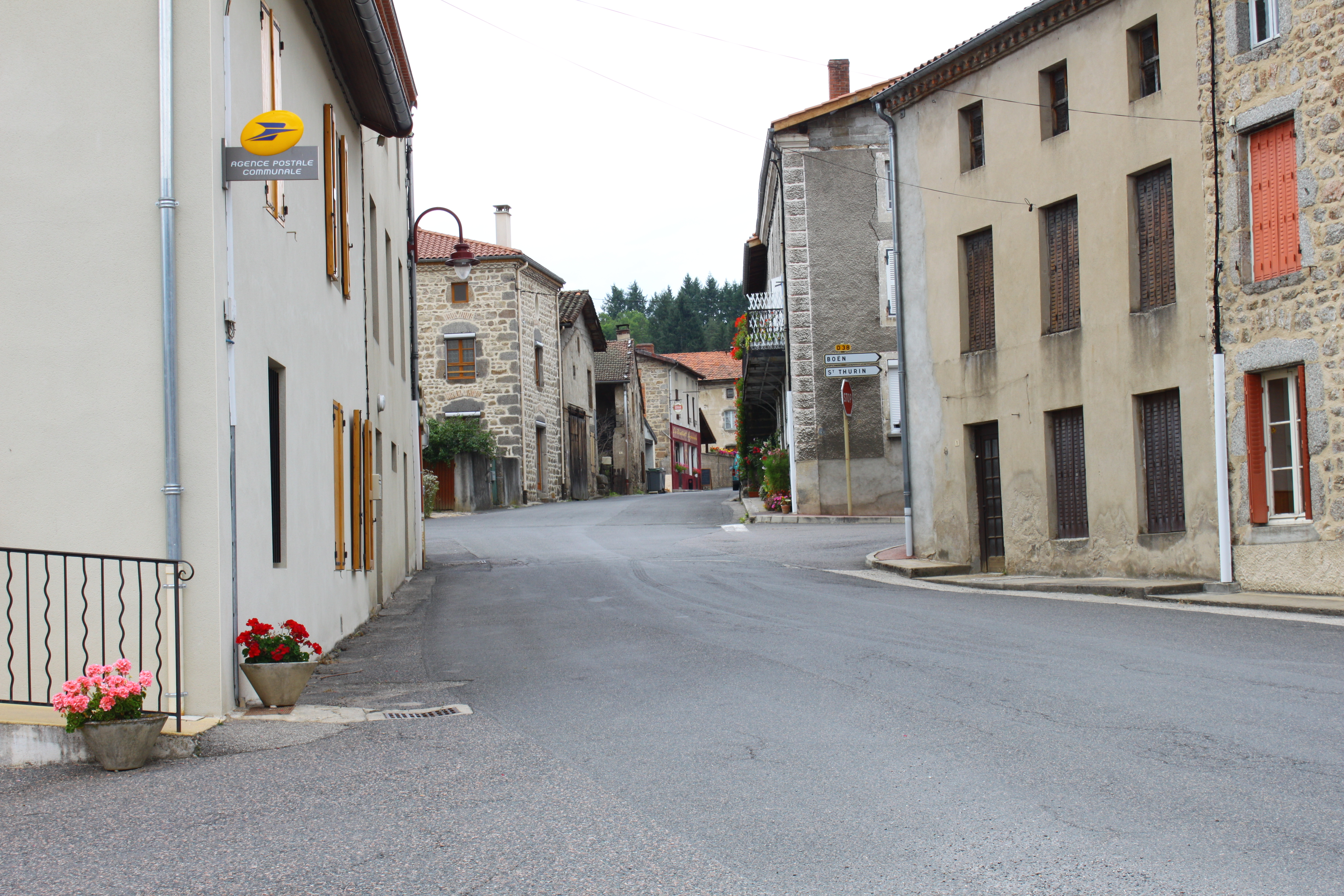
- A view within Saint-Julien-la-Vêtre

- Coat of arms
- Location of Saint-Julien-la-Vêtre
- Location within France Location within Auvergne-Rhône-Alpes
- Coordinates: 45°48′54″N 3°49′32″E
- Country: France
- Region: Auvergne-Rhône-Alpes
- Department: Loire
- Arrondissement: Montbrison
- Canton: Boën-sur-Lignon
- Commune: Vêtre-sur-Anzon
- Area^{1}: 12.9 km^{2} (5.0 sq mi)
- Elevation: 600 m (2,000 ft)
- Highest elevation: 823 m (2,700 ft)
- Lowest elevation: 490 m (1,610 ft)
- Population (2022): 361
  - Density: 28.0/km^{2} (72.5/sq mi)
- Time zone: UTC+01:00 (CET)
  - Summer (DST): UTC+02:00 (CEST)
- Postal code: 42440
- ^{1} French Land Register data, which excludes lakes, ponds, glaciers > 1 km^{2} (0.386 sq mi or 247 acres) and river estuaries.

Saint-Julien-la-Vêtre (French pronunciation: [sɛ̃ ʒyljɛ̃ la vɛtʁ]) is a former commune in the Loire department in central France. On 1 January 2019, it was merged into the new commune Vêtre-sur-Anzon.

== See also ==
- Communes of the Loire department
