= Henry S. Julian =

American lawyer and politician (1862–1939)

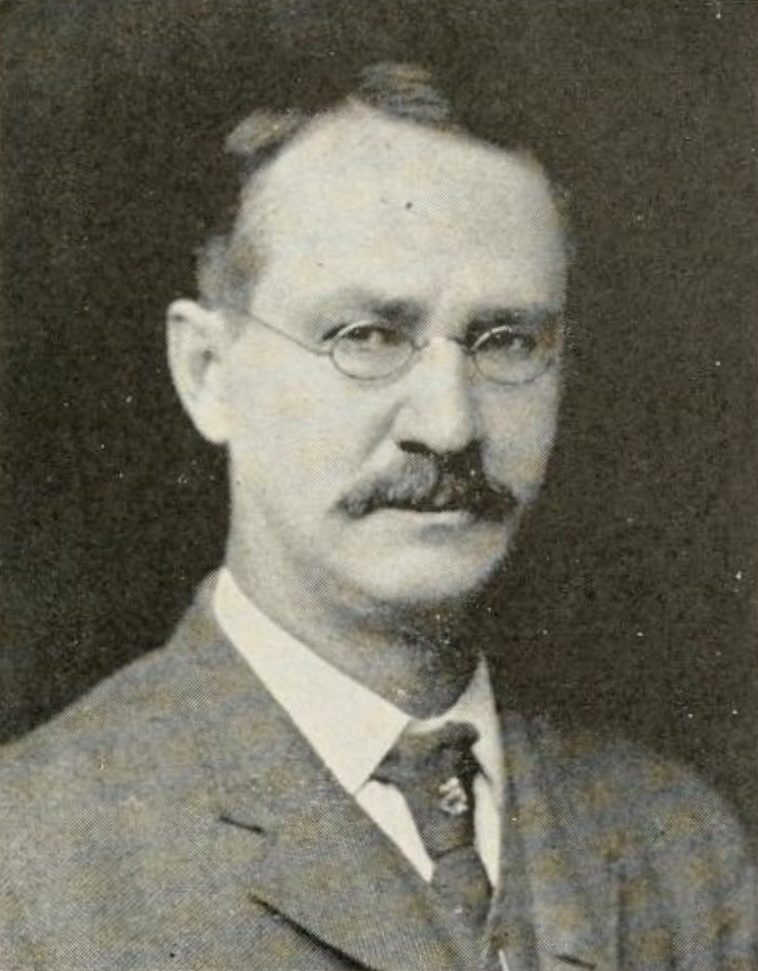
- Julian (c. 1902)

Member of Missouri House of Representatives
- In office 1891–1895

Personal details
- Born: Henry Saint Julian; July 23, 1862 Frankfort, Kentucky, U.S.
- Died: August 26, 1939 (aged 77) Rochester, Minnesota, U.S.
- Resting place: Arlington National Cemetery; Arlington, Virginia, U.S.
- Party: Democratic
- Spouse: Winifred Whitsett (died 1937)
- Relations: William Alexander Julian (brother)
- Children: 1
- Education: University of Michigan Law School
- Occupation: Lawyer; politician; military officer

Henry Saint Julian (July 23, 1862 – August 26, 1939) was a lawyer and politician from Missouri. He was a member of the Missouri House of Representatives from 1891 to 1895 and served as chief of police in Kansas City, Missouri.

== Early life ==
Henry Saint Julian was born on July 23, 1862, in Frankfort, Kentucky. His father was a farmer. His brother was William Alexander Julian. He was related to George W. Julian. He attended public schools and graduated from the Kentucky Military Institute in 1881. Julian graduated with a law degree from the University of Michigan Law School in 1884 and was admitted to the bar.

== Career ==
After graduating, Julian moved back to Frankfort and practiced law for a year. Julian moved to Kansas City, Missouri in August 1885, to start a law practice.

Julian was a Democrat. In 1888, Julian ran for city attorney of Kansas City but lost to Hawkins. Julian was elected as a member of the Missouri House of Representatives in 1890. He served in this role in 1891, 1892 and 1894. He introduced a bill to tax franchises. The bill was unsuccessful, but it would clear the path for later legislation. In December 1896, Julian was appointed as chief of police of the Kansas City Police Department after the death of L. E. Irwin. He put a stop to the "reign of terror" by instituting "shoot to kill" orders. He resigned as chief of police in April 1897 after charges were filed against him and Governor Lawrence Vest Stephens appointed new police commissioners to replace him.

Julian served as a militia captain in the early 1880s. During the Spanish–American War, in 1898, Julian was commissioned major of the 5th Missouri Volunteers by Governor Stephens and served until the war ended. He served as a captain in Company C of the 7th Regiment. In June 1934, Julian was appointed as assistant attorney general of the United States by Attorney General Homer S. Cummings.

== Personal life ==
Julian married Winifred Whitsett. They had one daughter, Laura Elizabeth. She died on February 14, 1937. While in Washington, D.C., the Julians lived at 3701 Connecticut Avenue.

Julian died on August 26, 1939, following a thyroid operation at Mayo Clinic in Rochester, Minnesota. He was buried at Arlington National Cemetery.
