= Oh Julie =

Oh Julie may refer to:

- "Oh Julie" (The Crescendos song), covered by Sammy Salvo
- "Oh Julie" (Shakin' Stevens song), covered by Barry Manilow
