= R. M. Wanamaker =

American judge

Reuben Melville Wanamaker
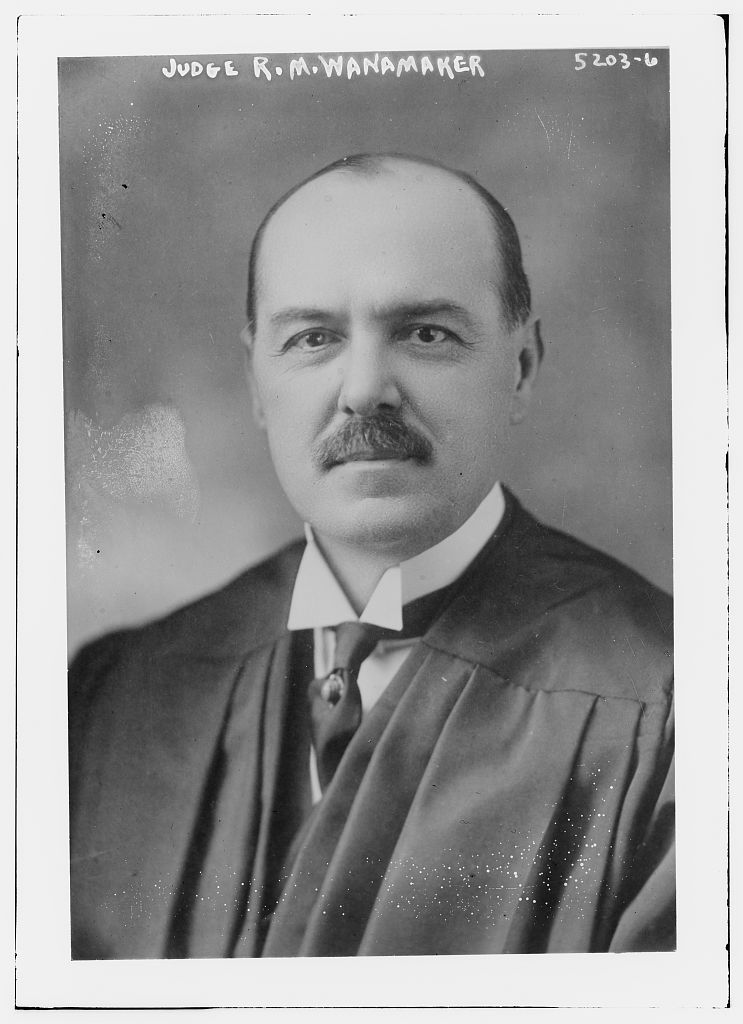
- Wanamaker circa 1920

Associate Justice of the Ohio Supreme Court
- In office January 1, 1913 – June 18, 1924
- Preceded by: William Z. Davis
- Succeeded by: Harry L. Conn

Personal details
- Born: August 2, 1866 North Jackson, Ohio
- Died: June 18, 1924 (aged 57) Columbus, Ohio
- Party: Progressive; Republican
- Spouse: Fannie Snow
- Children: two
- Education: Ohio Northern University; Pettit College of Law

Reuben Melville Wanamaker (August 2, 1866 – June 18, 1924) was a judge in the U.S. state of Ohio. He served on the Ohio Supreme Court from 1913 until he took his life in 1924.

== Biography ==
R. M. Wanamaker was born August 2, 1866 at North Jackson, Ohio. He grew up on a farm and attended the local schools, and a course to become a teacher at Ohio Northern University in Ada, Ohio. He taught school and was principal at Lima, Ohio, while studying law at a Lima firm.

Wanamaker entered law school at Ohio Northern in 1891, while teaching in Ada, and was admitted to the bar, March, 1893, before graduating. He located in Akron, Ohio that autumn, and opened a law practice with a classmate.

In 1895, Wanamaker was elected prosecuting attorney of Summit County, and he was re-elected in 1898. He was elected to the Common Pleas Court in 1905, and was re-elected in 1910.

In 1912, the Republican Party in Ohio was in disarray, with Taft and Roosevelt factions disagreeing. Wanamaker decided to run as a Progressive, and was nominated at the state party convention. There were thirteen candidates for the two available seats. Wanamaker and Democrat Oscar W. Newman won. Wanamaker was the first candidate to be elected to the Supreme Court without major party support. Wanamaker was seated January 1, 1913. He ran for re-election in 1918, as a Republican, and won another six years.

Wanamaker's book, The Voice of Lincoln, was published in 1918.

Wanamaker began to suffer severe depression in 1923. Medical treatment did not help alleviate it. He did not hear cases, but did participate in conferences to break 3-3 ties on the court. He decided not to enter the 1924 Republican primary for re-election, and decided to run as an independent, hoping to recover enough to campaign.

Wanamaker entered Mount Carmel Hospital, Columbus, Ohio, June 12, 1924 for treatment of his depression. On June 18, 1924, he killed himself by leaping from his fourth story window of the hospital. His funeral was in Akron.

== Personal ==
Wanamaker was married April 7, 1890 to Fannie Jane Snow. They had two children. He was a member of the Knights of Pythias, I.O.O.F., B.P.O.E., K.O.T.M., and M.W.A.
