= Saint Julius =

Saint Julius is the name of:

- Pope Julius I (died 352), pope from February 6, 337 to April 12, 352
- See Julius and Aaron (died 304) for Julius, British martyr
- Saint Julius the Veteran, Nicene saint and martyr
- Saint Julius of Novara (330–401), after whom the Saint Julius Island is named
- Saint Julius Island, an island in northern Italy
