= Robert F. Julian =

American lawyer

Robert F. Julian is a former New York judge, former sports executive and lawyer.

Julian served as the majority leader of the Oneida County Board of Legislators from 1978 to 2000, the president of the New York-Penn Baseball League from 1992 to 2000, and as a New York Supreme Court judge from 2001 to 2008,

== Political career ==
In 1978, Julian was elected to the Oneida County Board of Legislators.

As majority leader of the Board, Julian wrote a law on solid waste that became the basis of a United States Supreme Court case. The court articulated that solid waste was not a commodity in commerce and thus local governments in America could fund solid waste systems by requiring citizens and businesses to dispose of waste to local government. Julian was described by The New York Times as "a formidable power broker".

Julian left the Board in 2000.

== Baseball management career ==
In 1992, Julian became president of the New York-Penn League. During his tenure, Julian led the effort to obtain 100 million dollars in stadium improvements for the 14 team minor league.

Working with then mayor Rudolph Giuliani, Julian led the successful effort to relocate New York-Penn League teams into Brooklyn and Staten Island.

Julian left the League in 2000.

== Legal career ==
In 1992, Julian was a practicing lawyer who obtained the first negligent infliction of the HIV virus verdict. This case helped define and accentuate the need for retractable needles when treating HIV patients. ( NYT/NYLawJournal)

In 2001, Julian was elected to the State Supreme Court with the support of all four major parties, Julian's tenure as a judge was not without controversy. He was criticized for having clerked to become a lawyer in the 1970s after having been expelled from law school. (NYT) However, he received high ratings from the lawyers who appeared in front of him, having been described as "a pragmatic judge" and "the absolute picture of judicial decorum." The attorneys also praised his fairness and his "excellent" knowledge of the law. As a judge, Julian decided one of the early cases holding that parental smoking and secondhand smoke was a risk to children and a factor in parental custody and parenting time in matrimonial cases. (DeMatteo) .

In 2005, Julian earned a LL.M. (Master of Laws) in 2005 from the University of London.

Julian left the Court in 2008. That same year, Julian received a Ph.D. from Queen Mary and Westfield Law School, University of London, while chapters of his dissertation were published in the United Kingdom Criminal Law Journal.

Julian practices law in Syracuse and Utica, New York. His practice has represented judges accused of misconduct by the New York State Commission on Judicial Conduct (Hedges Law Journal/trial cites).

== National and International Recognition ==
- ABC News & Good Morning America.
- People Magazine.
- BBC News.
- CBS News.

== State and Local Recognition ==
- ABC News Channel 9 Syracuse, NY.
- NYS Commission on Judicial Conduct.
- New York State Court.
- Utica Observer Dispatch.
- Utica Observer Dispatch.
