= São Julião =

São Julião may refer to:

== People ==
- São Julião, Portuguese for Saint Julian

== Places ==
=== Brazil ===
- São Julião (Piauí), a municipality in the State of Piauí

=== Portugal ===
- São Julião (Gouveia), a civil parish in the municipality of Gouveia
- São Julião (Portalegre), a civil parish in the municipality of Portalegre
- São Julião (Setúbal), a civil parish in the municipality of Setúbal
- São Julião (Valença), a civil parish in the municipality of Valença
- São Julião da Figueira da Foz, a civil parish in the municipality of Figueira da Foz
- São Julião de Montenegro, a civil parish in the municipality of Chaves
- São Julião de Palácios, a civil parish in the municipality of Bragança
- São Julião dos Passos, a civil parish in the municipality of Braga
- São Julião do Tojal, a civil parish in the municipality of Loures
