= Julien Inc. =

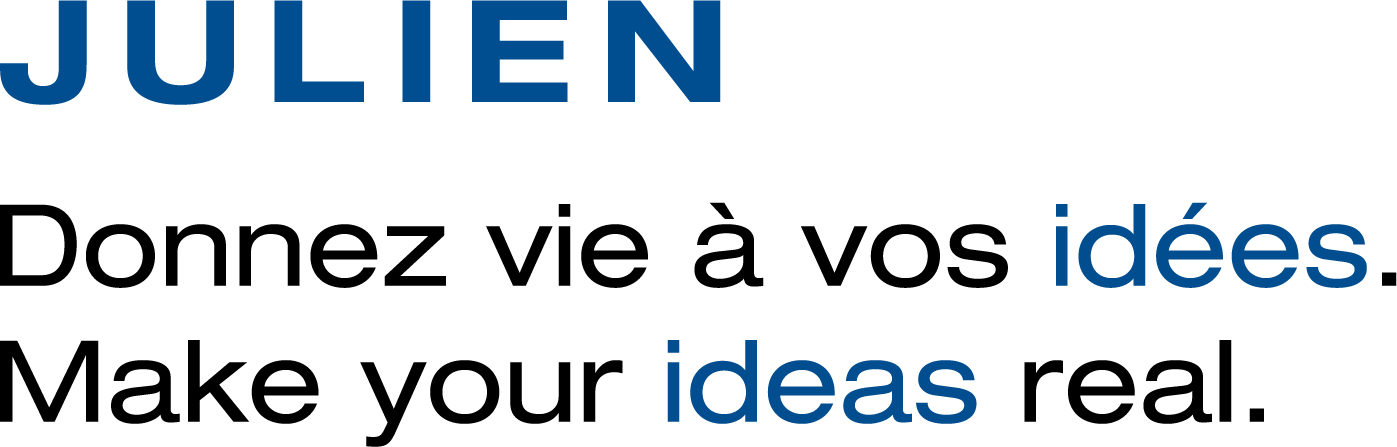
- Company type: Private company
- Industry: Manufacturing
- Founded: Quebec City, Quebec (1946)
- Headquarters: 955, rue Lachance; Quebec City, Quebec; G1P 2H3
- Key people: Léo T. Julien, founder Gilles St-Pierre, President and CEO
- Products: Stainless steel subcontracting and parts, residential products (sinks), custom professional kitchen equipment
- Revenue: Private
- Website: www.julien.ca

Julien Inc. is a stainless steel fabrication company. Through its residential, commercial and industrial subcontracting divisions, Julien has completed projects in 13 countries in a wide range of sectors, including transport, electrical and household appliances, agrifood, and the medical and food processing equipment industries.

Julien Inc. has over 300 employees at its headquarters and 170,000-square-foot (16,000 m^{2}) production facility in Quebec City.

== History ==
Founded in 1946 by Léo T. Julien under the name Accessoires de cuisine ltée, the company began by selling kitchen accessories to restaurant owners in the Quebec City area. Noting his customers' needs for custom equipment, Mr. Julien opened a factory and managed it until his death in 1973. In 1974, Somesco Inc. acquired Accessoires de cuisine ltée, which became Les entreprises Julien inc. Management then focused on institutional, commercial, and industrial markets and began handling turnkey kitchen equipment contracts. The company grew quickly and in 1978, management decided to build a new 40,000-square-foot (3,700 m^{2}) plant.

By the early 80s, the company was active throughout Quebec and began development of new geographic markets, first in Ontario, then in the Maritimes. In 1986, Berthier Chénard, one of the firm's shareholders, teamed up with three company executives, including current president and CEO Gilles St-Pierre, to buy out Les entreprises Julien inc. Their goal was to take the company in a new direction by developing the subcontracting market. The following year they computerized the firm's design and management operations and completely automated production. In 1989, Les entreprises Julien inc. acquired its own building and enlarged and modernized its plant.

The following years were marked by the computerization of production and the use of more advanced technology, including modernized management processes, design and manufacturing facilities, digitally controlled equipment, and a laser cutter. Everything was put in place to begin exploring the new industrial subcontracting market. In 1995, Gilles St-Pierre and other company executives acquired Les entreprises Julien inc. The new management team turned its attention to developing its areas of expertise and markets. In 1998, the company changed its name to Julien Inc. The following year, sales reached $36 million CAD before jumping to $45 million CAD in 2000.

== Current Markets ==
Julien's main customer base is in the United States and Canada. However, it has done contracts in North Africa, the Middle East, and Europe.
