= Julie (opera) =

Opera by Philippe Boesmans

- Opera by Philippe Boesmans
- Librettist: Luc Bondy; Marie Louise-Bischofberger
- Language: German
- Based on: August Strindberg's Miss Julie
- Premiere: 2005; La Monnaie, Brussels

Julie is a one-act chamber opera written by the Belgian composer Philippe Boesmans, who was composer-in-residence of the Brussels opera house, La Monnaie. It is based on August Strindberg's 1888 play, Miss Julie, with a libretto by Luc Bondy and Marie Louise-Bischofberger written in German.

It received its premiere production in March 2005 at La Monnaie and was subsequently seen in Vienna and as part of the July 2005 Festival d‘Aix-en-Provence. A live performance was recorded at Aix-en-Provence and released on DVD.
