= Peter Julian (artist) =

American artist (born 1952)

Peter Julian (born 1952 in Buffalo, New York) is an American artist best known for his Neo-expressionist paintings in the 1980s. His first major exhibition was in New York in 1982 at The New Museum as part of the museum’s annual “New Work/New York” series of exhibitions.

== Background and education ==
Julian moved with his family to Dallas, Texas in 1960 and received a BFA at Southern Methodist University, Meadows School of the Arts in 1975. He moved to New York City in 1975 to work with artists Red Grooms and Mimi Gross as a member of their Ruckus Construction Company on various Ruckus projects (Ruckus Manhattan, 1975–1976; Ruckus Rodeo, 1976; various Ruckus films, 1975–1976) and then with Robert Whitman from 1976 through 1979 on various Robert Whitman performances and installations.

In 1980, he participated in the seminal exhibition “The Times Square Show” in New York and by 1982 was showing his work in exhibitions internationally.

== Other media ==
Julian has also worked extensively with various printmaking techniques since 1982 (lithography, woodcut, intaglio, pochoir, silkscreen and monotype). His first published print was included in the “American Artist as Printmaker” biennial exhibition at the Brooklyn Museum in 1982 and in the Landfall Press retrospective: “Landfall Press: Twenty-Five Years of Printmaking” in 1996 at the Milwaukee Art Museum. Since 2002 he has been producing large- and small-scale sculpture in various media: ceramic, bronze and multi-media.
