= Chris Julian (designer) =

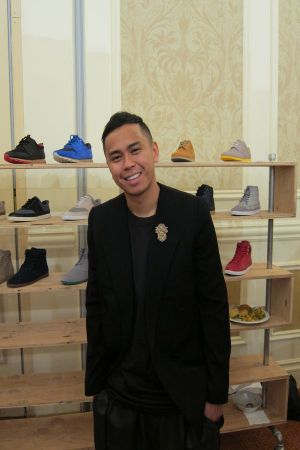

Chris Julian is a designer, philanthropist and retail entrepreneur.

Chris Julian started Fruition Las Vegas in 2005 carrying clothing diverse in brands, time periods, and styles. Julian further established retail stores in Las Vegas opening Stüssy, Monogram and Undefeated as a managing partner. Julian worked with Kanye West as a concept designer for Yeezy and for West's 2008 brand Pastelle.

In 2011 he partnered with LeBron James to co-own the high-profile boutique UNKNWN in Miami's Aventura Mall.

In 2018 he produced a fashion film with Jerry Lorenzo for Fear of God that starred Jared Leto.
