= 1901 in the United States =

- Decades: 1880s; 1890s; 1900s; 1910s; 1920s
- See also: History of the United States (1865–1918); Timeline of United States history (1900–1929); List of years in the United States

Events from the year 1901 in the United States.

== Incumbents ==
=== Federal government ===
- President:

William McKinley (R-Ohio) (until September 14)
Theodore Roosevelt (R-New York) (starting September 14)

- Vice President:

vacant (until March 4)
Theodore Roosevelt (R-New York) (March 4 – September 14)
vacant (starting September 14)

- Chief Justice: Melville Fuller (Illinois)
- Speaker of the House of Representatives: David B. Henderson (R-Iowa)
- Congress: 56th (until March 4), 57th (starting March 4)

==== State governments ====
Governors and lieutenant governors

=== Governors ===
- Governor of Alabama: William J. Samford (Democratic) (until June 11), William D. Jelks (Democratic) (starting June 11)
- Governor of Arkansas: Daniel Webster Jones (Democratic) (until January 8), Jeff Davis (Democratic) (starting January 8)
- Governor of California: Henry Gage (Republican)
- Governor of Colorado: Charles Spalding Thomas (Democratic) (until January 8), James Bradley Orman (Democratic) (starting January 8)
- Governor of Connecticut: George E. Lounsbury (Republican) (until January 9), George P. McLean (Republican) (starting January 9)
- Governor of Delaware: Ebe W. Tunnell (Democratic) (until January 15), John Hunn (Republican) (starting January 15)
- Governor of Florida: William D. Bloxham (Democratic) (until January 8), William Sherman Jennings (Democratic) (starting January 8)
- Governor of Georgia: Allen D. Candler (Democratic)
- Governor of Idaho: Frank Steunenberg (Democratic) (until January 7), Frank W. Hunt (Democratic) (starting January 7)
- Governor of Illinois: John Riley Tanner (Republican) (until January 14), Richard Yates Jr. (Republican) (starting January 14)
- Governor of Indiana: James A. Mount (Republican) (until January 14), Winfield T. Durbin (Republican) (starting January 14)
- Governor of Iowa: Leslie M. Shaw (Republican)
- Governor of Kansas: William E. Stanley (Republican)
- Governor of Kentucky: J. C. W. Beckham (Democratic)
- Governor of Louisiana: William Wright Heard (Democratic)
- Governor of Maine: Llewellyn Powers (Republican) (until January 2), John Fremont Hill (Republican) (starting January 2)
- Governor of Maryland: John Walter Smith (Democratic)
- Governor of Massachusetts: Winthrop Murray Crane (Republican)
- Governor of Michigan: Hazen S. Pingree (Republican) (until January 1), Aaron T. Bliss (Republican) (starting January 1)
- Governor of Minnesota: John Lind (Democratic) (until January 7), Samuel Rinnah Van Sant (Republican) (starting January 7)
- Governor of Mississippi: Andrew H. Longino (Democratic)
- Governor of Missouri: Lon Vest Stephens (Democratic) (until January 14), Alexander Monroe Dockery (Democratic) (starting January 14)
- Governor of Montana: Robert Burns Smith (Democratic) (until January 7), Joseph Toole (Democratic) (starting January 7)
- Governor of Nebraska:
  - until January 3: William A. Poynter (Democratic)
  - January 3-May 1: Charles Henry Dietrich (Republican)
  - starting May 1: Ezra P. Savage (Republican)
- Governor of Nevada: Reinhold Sadler (Silver)
- Governor of New Hampshire: Frank W. Rollins (Republican) (until January 3), Chester B. Jordan (Republican) (starting January 3)
- Governor of New Jersey: Foster MacGowan Voorhees (Republican)
- Governor of New York: Benjamin Barker Odell Jr. (Republican) (starting January 1)
- Governor of North Carolina: Daniel Lindsay Russell (Republican) (until January 15), Charles Brantley Aycock (Democratic) (starting January 15)
- Governor of North Dakota: Frederick B. Fancher (Republican) (until January 10), Frank White (Republican) (starting January 10)
- Governor of Ohio: George K. Nash (Republican)
- Governor of Oregon: T. T. Geer (Republican)
- Governor of Pennsylvania: William A. Stone (Republican)
- Governor of Rhode Island: William Gregory (Republican) (until December 16), Charles D. Kimball (Republican) (starting December 16)
- Governor of South Carolina: Miles Benjamin McSweeney (Democratic)
- Governor of South Dakota: Andrew E. Lee (Populist) (until January 8), Charles N. Herreid (Republican) (starting January 8)
- Governor of Tennessee: Benton McMillin (Democratic)
- Governor of Texas: Joseph D. Sayers (Democratic)
- Governor of Utah: Heber Manning Wells (Republican)
- Governor of Vermont: William W. Stickney (Republican)
- Governor of Virginia: James Hoge Tyler (Democratic)
- Governor of Washington: John Rankin Rogers (Populist)/(Democratic) (until December 26), Henry McBride (Republican) (starting December 26)
- Governor of West Virginia: George W. Atkinson (Republican) (until March 4), Albert B. White (Republican) (starting March 4)
- Governor of Wisconsin: Edward Scofield (Republican) (until January 7), Robert M. La Follette Sr. (Republican) (starting January 7)
- Governor of Wyoming: DeForest Richards (Republican)

=== Lieutenant governors ===
- Lieutenant Governor of California: Jacob H. Neff (Republican)
- Lieutenant Governor of Colorado: Francis Patrick Carney (Populist) (until January 8), David Courtney Coates (Democratic) (starting January 8)
- Lieutenant Governor of Connecticut: Lyman A. Mills (Republican) (until January 9), Edwin O. Keeler (Republican) (starting January 9)
- Lieutenant Governor of Delaware: Philip L. Cannon (Republican) (starting January 15)
- Lieutenant Governor of Idaho: J. H. Hutchinson (Democratic) (until January 7), Thomas F. Terrell (Democratic) (starting January 7)
- Lieutenant Governor of Illinois: William Northcott (Republican)
- Lieutenant Governor of Indiana: William S. Haggard (Republican) (until January 11), Newton W. Gilbert (Republican) (starting January 11)
- Lieutenant Governor of Iowa: James C. Milliman (Republican)
- Lieutenant Governor of Kansas: Harry E. Richter (Republican)
- Lieutenant Governor of Kentucky: vacant
- Lieutenant Governor of Louisiana: Albert Estopinal (Democratic)
- Lieutenant Governor of Massachusetts: John L. Bates (Republican)
- Lieutenant Governor of Michigan: Orrin W. Robinson (Republican)
- Lieutenant Governor of Minnesota: Lyndon A. Smith (Republican)
- Lieutenant Governor of Mississippi: James T. Harrison (Democratic)
- Lieutenant Governor of Missouri: August Bolte (Democratic) (until January 14), John Adams Lee (Democratic) (starting January 14)
- Lieutenant Governor of Montana: Archibald E. Spriggs (political party unknown) (until month and day unknown), Frank G. Higgins (Democratic) (starting month and day unknown)
- Lieutenant Governor of Nebraska:
  - until January 3: Edward A. Gilbert (Republican)
  - January 3-May 1: Ezra P. Savage (Republican)
  - starting May 1: vacant
- Lieutenant Governor of Nevada: James R. Judge (political party unknown)
- Lieutenant Governor of New York: Timothy L. Woodruff (Republican)
- Lieutenant Governor of North Carolina: Charles A. Reynolds (Republican) (until January 15), Wilfred D. Turner (Democratic) (starting January 15)
- Lieutenant Governor of North Dakota: vacant (until January 10), David Bartlett (Republican) (starting January 10)
- Lieutenant Governor of Ohio: John A. Caldwell (Republican)
- Lieutenant Governor of Pennsylvania: John P. S. Gobin (Republican)
- Lieutenant Governor of Rhode Island: Charles D. Kimball (Republican) (until December 16), vacant (starting December 16)
- Lieutenant Governor of South Carolina: Robert B. Scarborough (Democratic) (until January 15), James H. Tillman (Democratic) (starting January 15)
- Lieutenant Governor of South Dakota: John T. Kean (Republican) (until January 8), George W. Snow (Republican) (starting January 8)
- Lieutenant Governor of Tennessee: Seid Waddell (Democratic) (until month and day unknown), Newton H. White (Democratic) (starting month and day unknown)
- Lieutenant Governor of Texas: James Browning (Democratic)
- Lieutenant Governor of Vermont: Martin F. Allen (Republican)
- Lieutenant Governor of Virginia: Edward Echols (Democratic)
- Lieutenant Governor of Washington:
  - until January 16: Thurston Daniels (Populist)
  - January 16-December 26: Henry McBride (Republican)
  - starting December 26: vacant
- Lieutenant Governor of Wisconsin: Jesse Stone (Republican)

== Events ==
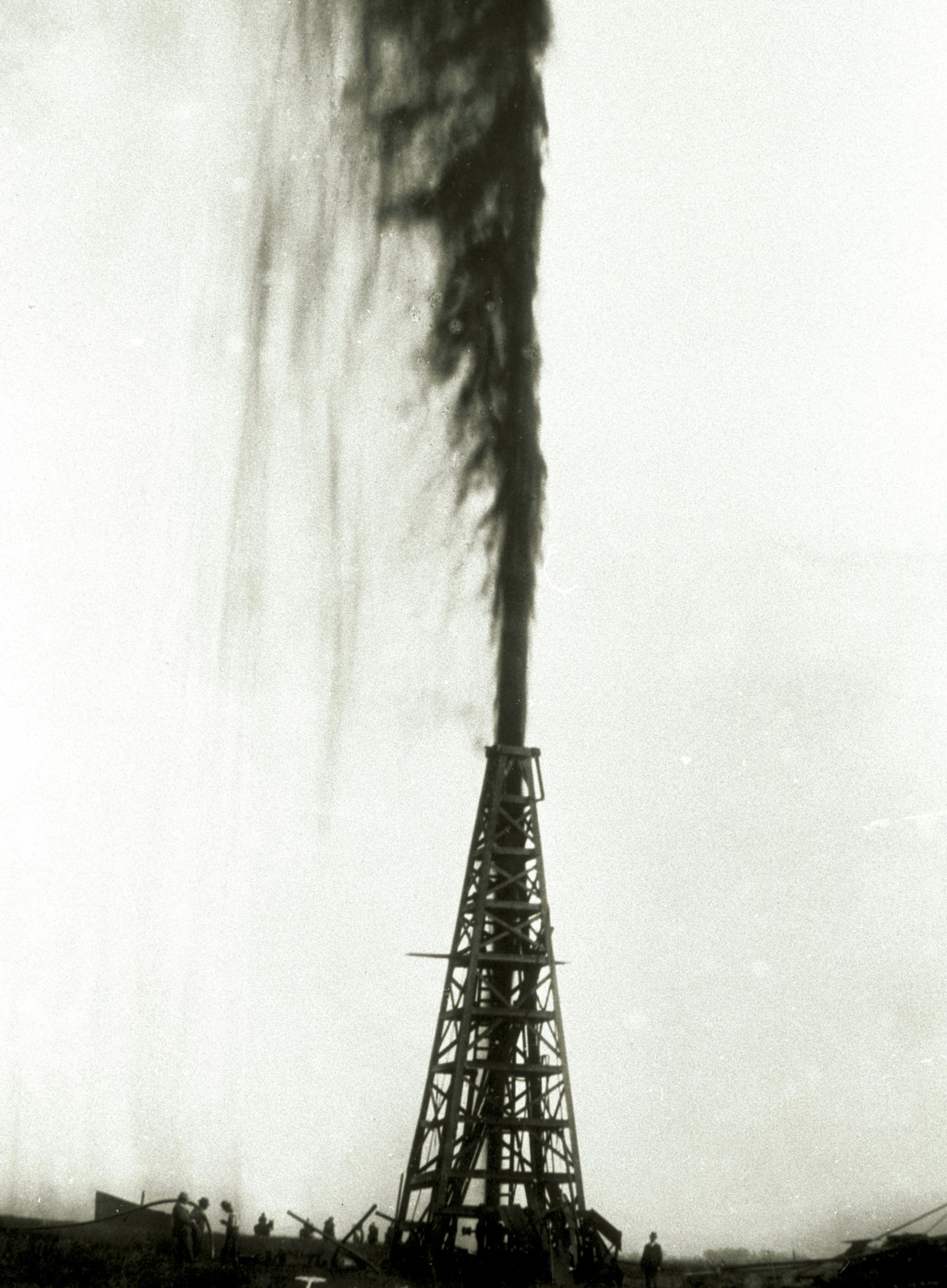
January 10: Oil in Texas.

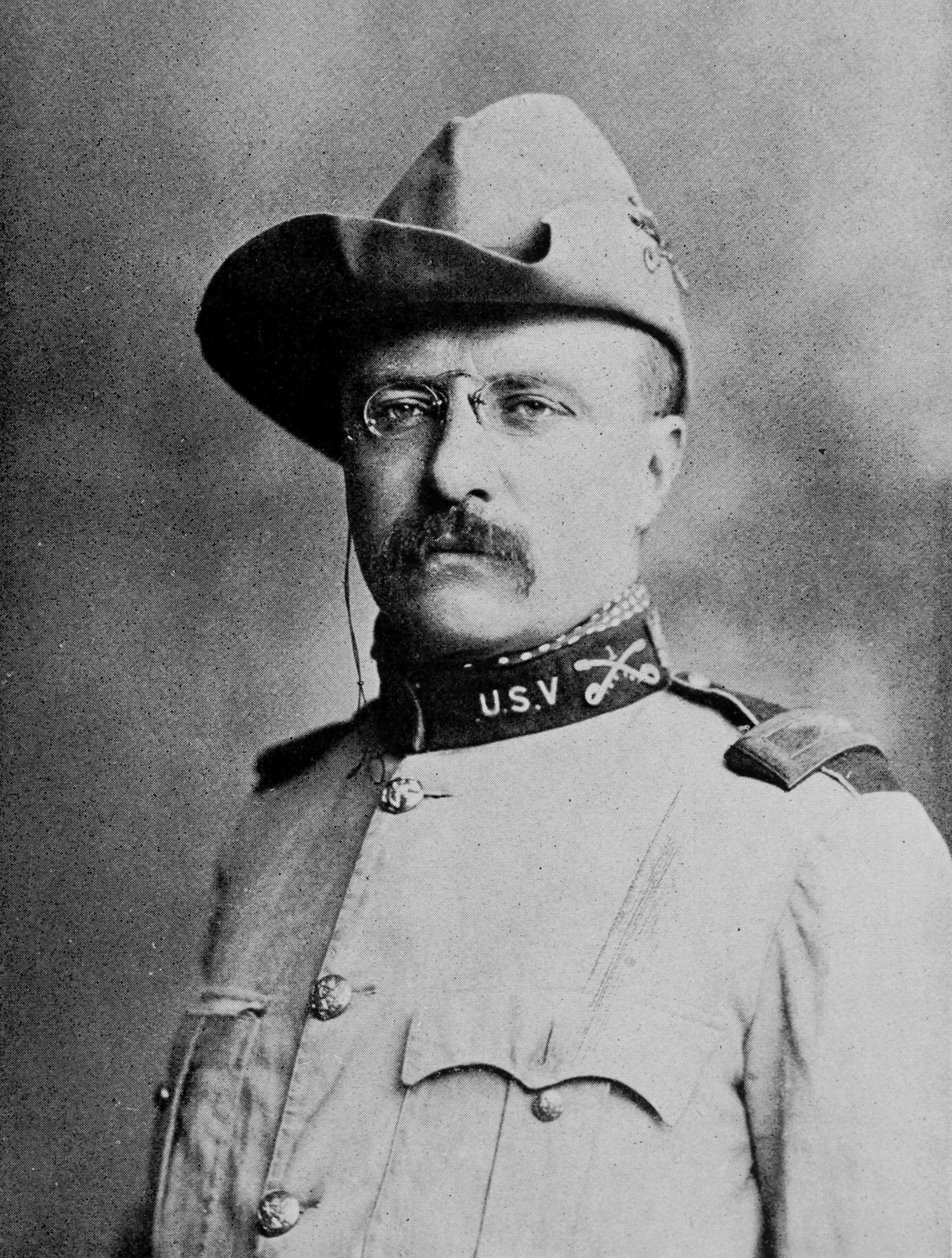
March 4: Theodore Roosevelt becomes the 25th U.S. vice president

=== January–March ===
- January 1 – Pentecostalism is born, at a prayer meeting at Bethel Bible College in Topeka, Kansas.
- January 3 – Census Commissioner predicts a US population of at least 300 million by 2001
- January 5 – Typhoid fever breaks out in a Seattle jail, the first of two typhoid outbreaks in the United States during the year.
- January 7 – Alfred Packer is released from prison in Colorado after serving 18 years for cannibalism.
- January 10 – In the first great Texas gusher, oil is discovered at Spindletop in Beaumont, Texas.
- January 22 – The Grand Opera House in Cincinnati, Ohio, is destroyed in a fire.
- January 28 – Baseball's American League declares itself a Major League.
- February 4 – Puccini's Tosca makes its U.S. debut at the Metropolitan Opera in New York.
- February 5
  - The Hay–Pauncefote Treaty is signed by the United Kingdom and United States, ceding control of the Panama Canal to the United States.
  - J. P. Morgan buys mines and steel mills in the United States, marking the first billion-dollar business deal.
  - In Evansville, Indiana, a fire burns through the business district, causing $175,000 of damage.
- February 20 – The Hawaii Territory Legislature convenes for the first time.
- February 25 – U.S. Steel, the first billion-dollar corporation and at some time the world's largest producer of steel, is incorporated by industrialist J. P. Morgan.
- March 2
  - The U.S. Congress passes the Platt Amendment, limiting the autonomy of Cuba as a condition for the withdrawal of American troops.
  - The Carnegie Steel Company with the Illinois Steel Company and The National Steel Company merge to form the United States Steel Corporation.
- March 4 – President William McKinley begins his second term; Theodore Roosevelt is sworn in as Vice President.
- March 9 – The Olds Motor Co. factory in Lansing, Michigan, burns to the ground; it is reconstructed with the world's first automobile assembly line for production of the Oldsmobile Curved Dash.

=== April–June ===
May 3: The Great Fire of 1901 in Jacksonville begins.

- April 25 – New York State becomes the first to require automobile license plates.
- May – Monte Ne health resort opens in the Ozarks.
- May 3 – The Great Fire of 1901 in Jacksonville, Florida, begins.
- May 17 – The U.S. stock market crashes for the first time.
- May 27 – The Edison Storage Battery Company is founded in New Jersey.
- May 28 – Cherry v. Des Moines Leader is decided in the Iowa Supreme Court, upholding the right to publish critical reviews.
- June 11 – William D. Jelks is sworn in as the 32nd governor of Alabama following the death of William J. Samford.
- June 12 – Cuba becomes a U.S. protectorate.

=== July–September ===
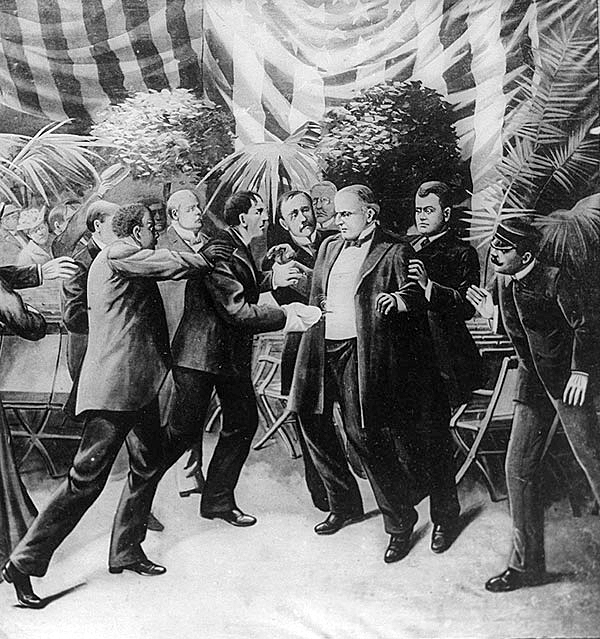
September 6: President McKinley is shot.

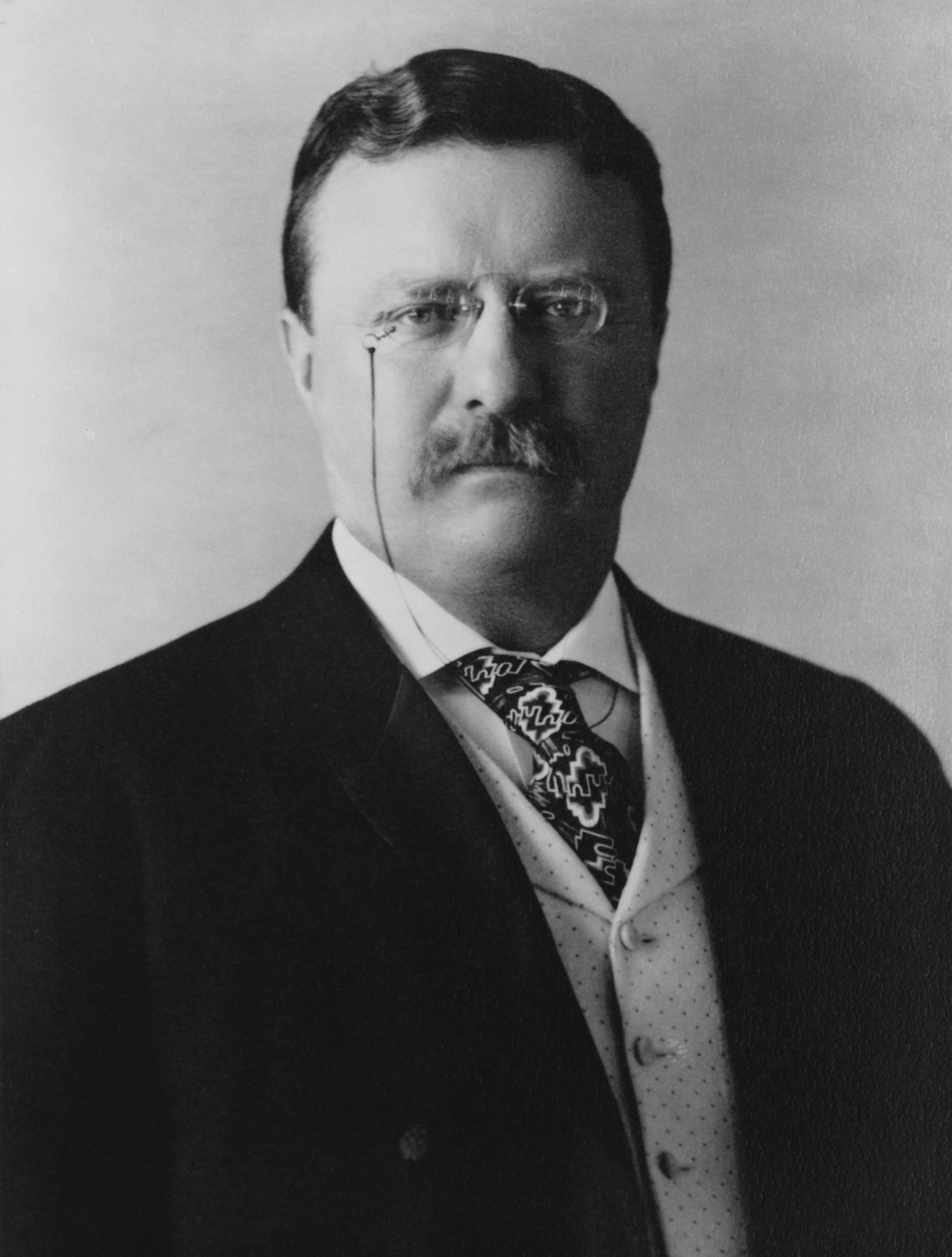
September 14: "Teddy" Roosevelt succeeds McKinley as the 26th U.S. president.

- June 22–July 31 – The worst heat wave in U.S. history until the 1930s, affecting most areas east of the 100th meridian, is estimated to have killed over 9,500 people.
- July 1 – The Bureau of Chemistry is established within the United States Department of Agriculture.
- July 24 – Author O. Henry is released from prison in Columbus, Ohio after serving 3 years for embezzlement from the First National Bank in Austin, Texas.
- August 10 – U.S. Steel recognition strike of 1901: Members of the Amalgamated Association of Iron, Steel, and Tin Workers begin a strike against United States Steel Corporation after failing to reach a settlement of their demands, and 14,000 employees walk off of the job.
- September 2 – Vice President Theodore Roosevelt utters the famous phrase, "Speak softly and carry a big stick" at the Minnesota State Fair.
- September 5 – The National Association of Professional Baseball Leagues (later renamed Minor League Baseball) is formed in Chicago.
- September 6 – American anarchist Leon Czolgosz shoots President William McKinley at the Pan-American Exposition in Buffalo, New York. McKinley dies 8 days later.
- September 7 – The Boxer Protocol is signed between the Qing Empire of China and the Eight-Nation Alliance.
- September 14 – Vice President Theodore Roosevelt becomes the 26th president of the United States, upon the death of President William McKinley.
- September 26 – The body of President Abraham Lincoln is exhumed and reinterred in concrete several feet thick.

=== October–December ===
- October 4 – The American yacht Columbia defeats the Irish Shamrock in the America's Cup yachting race in New York.
- October 16 – President Theodore Roosevelt invites African American leader Booker T. Washington to the White House. The American South reacts angrily to the visit, and racial violence increases in the region.
- October 23 – Yale University celebrates its bicentennial.
- October 24 – Michigan schoolteacher Annie Taylor goes down Niagara Falls in a barrel and survives.
- October 29
  - In Amherst, New Hampshire, nurse Jane Toppan is arrested for murdering the Davis family of Boston with an overdose of morphine; she will confess to at least 31 killings.
  - Leon Czolgosz, the assassin of William McKinley, is executed in the electric chair at Auburn state prison.
- November 1 – The Sigma Phi Epsilon college fraternity is founded in Richmond, Virginia.
- November 15 – The Alpha Sigma Alpha college fraternity is founded at Longwood University in Farmville, Virginia.
- November 28 – The new state constitution of Alabama requires voters to have passed literacy tests.
- December 3 – President Theodore Roosevelt delivers a 20,000-word speech to the House of Representatives asking Congress to curb the power of trusts "within reasonable limits."

=== Undated ===
- The Intercollegiate Prohibition Association is established in Chicago.
- Force (cereal) first produced.

=== Ongoing ===
- Progressive Era (1890s–1920s)
- Lochner era (c. 1897–c. 1937)
- Philippine–American War (1899–1902)

== Births ==
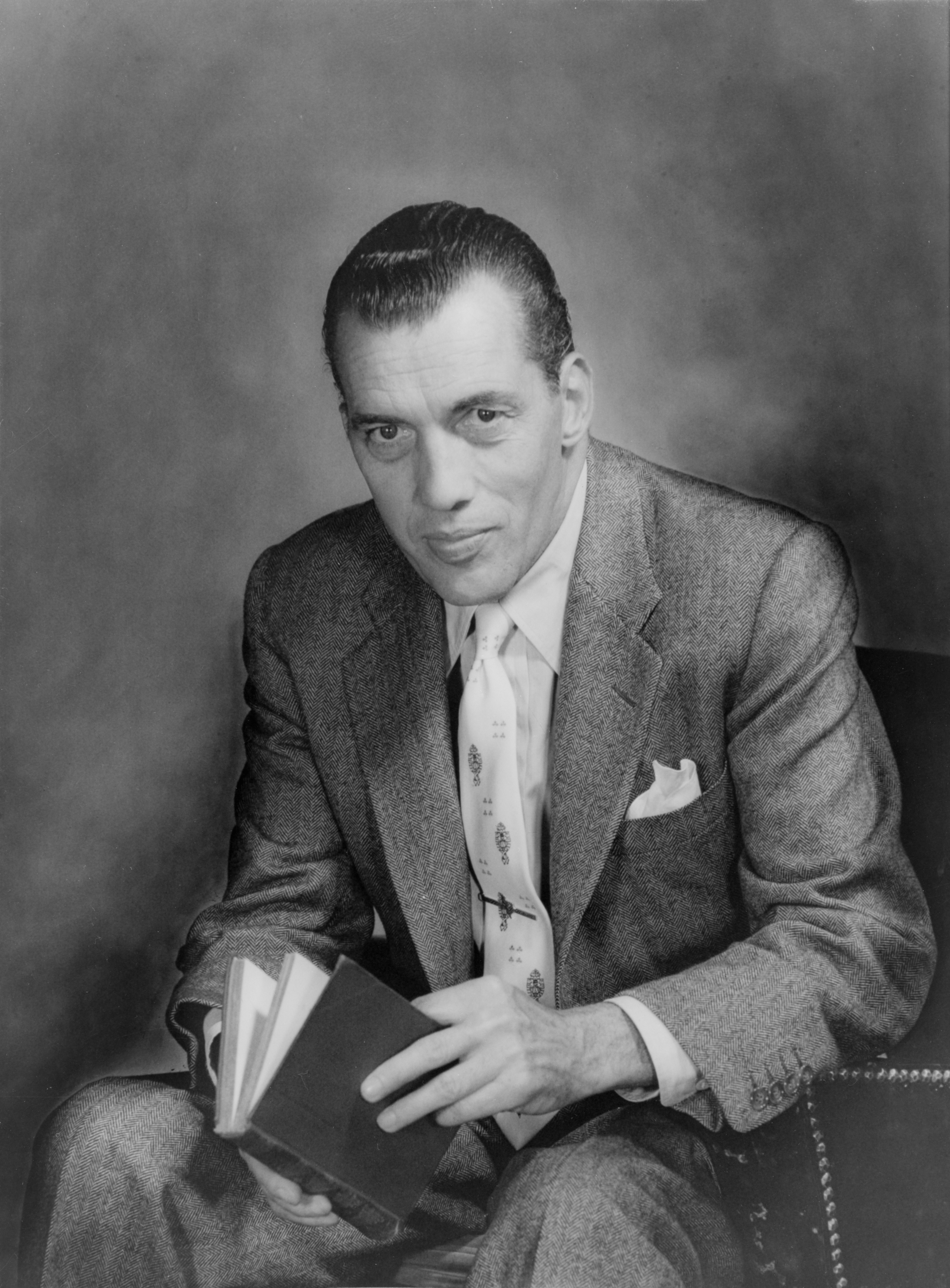
Ed Sullivan

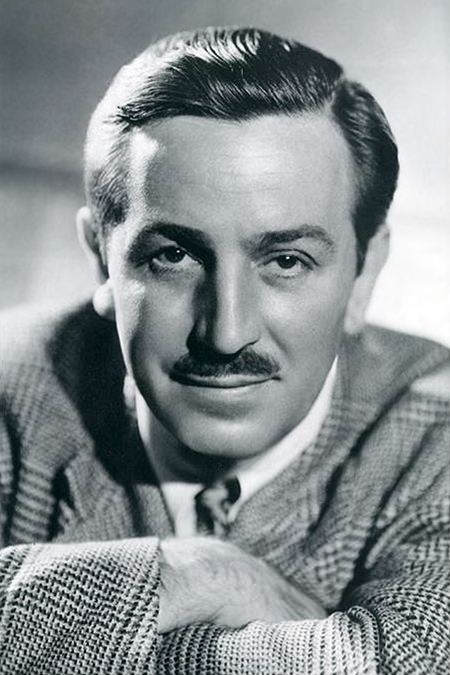
Walt Disney

- January 2
  - Lew Landers, film and television director (died 1962)
  - Bob Marshall, wilderness activist, founder of The Wilderness Society (died 1939)
- January 3 – Henrietta Bingham, journalist, newspaper executive, horse-breeder and anglophile (died 1968)
- January 4 – Raoul Berger, Ukrainian-born attorney and law professor (died 2000)
- January 9 – Chic Young, cartoonist (died 1973)
- January 16 – Frank Zamboni, inventor (died 1988)
- January 21 – Marcellus Boss, politician, lawyer, member of Kansas Senate and 5th Civilian Governor of Guam (died 1967)
- February 1
  - Howard I. Chapelle, naval architect, museum curator and author (died 1975)
  - Clark Gable, actor (died 1960)
- February 8 – Virginius Dabney, teacher, journalist, writer and editor (died 1995)
- February 9 – Brian Donlevy, actor (died 1972)
- February 10
  - Stella Adler, actress and teacher (died 1992)
  - Anthony Prusinski, politician (died 1950)
- February 22
  - Mildred Davis, actress (died 1969)
  - Charles Evans Whittaker, Associate Justice of the Supreme Court of the United States (died 1973)
- March 21 – Carmelita Geraghty, actress (died 1966)
- March 24 – Ub Iwerks, animator, cartoonist, character designer, inventor and special effects technician (died 1971)
- March 28 – Jack Weil, entrepreneur (died 2008)
- April 18 – Al Lewis, songwriter (died 1967)
- May 8 – Turkey Stearnes, baseball player (died 1979)
- May 21 – Sam Jaffe, film producer (died 2000)
- June 12 – Arnold Kirkeby, hotelier, art collector, and real estate investor (died 1962)
- July 3 – Ruth Crawford Seeger, modernist composer and folk music arranger (died 1953)
- July 9 – Jester Hairston, actor and composer (died 2000)
- July 10 – Daniel V. Gallery, admiral and author (died 1977)
- July 14
  - Lucien Prival, actor (died 1994)
  - George Tobias, actor (died 1980)
- July 20 – Heinie Manush, baseball player (died [1971)
- July 21 – Albert Hamilton Gordon, businessman and philanthropist (died 2009)
- July 22 – Pancho Barnes, pioneer aviator (died 1975)
- July 30 – John A. Carroll, U.S. Senator from Colorado from 1957 to 1963 (died 1983)
- August 3 – John C. Stennis, U.S. Senator from Mississippi from 1947 to 1989 (died 1995)
- August 4 – Louis Armstrong, jazz trumpeter (died 1971)
- August 5 – Thomas J. Ryan, admiral (died 1970)
- August 8 – Ernest Lawrence, nuclear physicist, winner of the Nobel Prize in Physics in 1939 (died 1958)
- August 23 – John Sherman Cooper, U.S. Senator from Kentucky 1946-1949, 1952-1955 and 1956-1973 (died 1991)
- August 28 – Babe London, actress and comedian (died 1980)
- September 5 – Florence Eldridge, actress (died 1988)
- September 24 – Gerald Warner Brace, writer, educator, sailor and boat builder (died 1978)
- September 28 – Ed Sullivan, entertainment writer and television host (died 1974)
- October 20 – Adelaide Hall, jazz singer and entertainer (died 1993 in the United Kingdom)
- October 28 – Hilo Hattie, native Hawaiian singer and actress (died 1979)
- November 28 – Walter Havighurst, critic, novelist, literary and social historian (died 1994)
- December 5 – Walt Disney, animator, producer, director, screenwriter, voice actor and business magnate (died 1966)
- December 7 – Troy Sanders, film score composer (died 1959)
- December 12 – Fred Barker, criminal member of the Barker-Karpis gang, son of Ma Barker (killed 1935)
- December 16 – Margaret Mead, cultural anthropologist and author (died 1978)

== Deaths ==
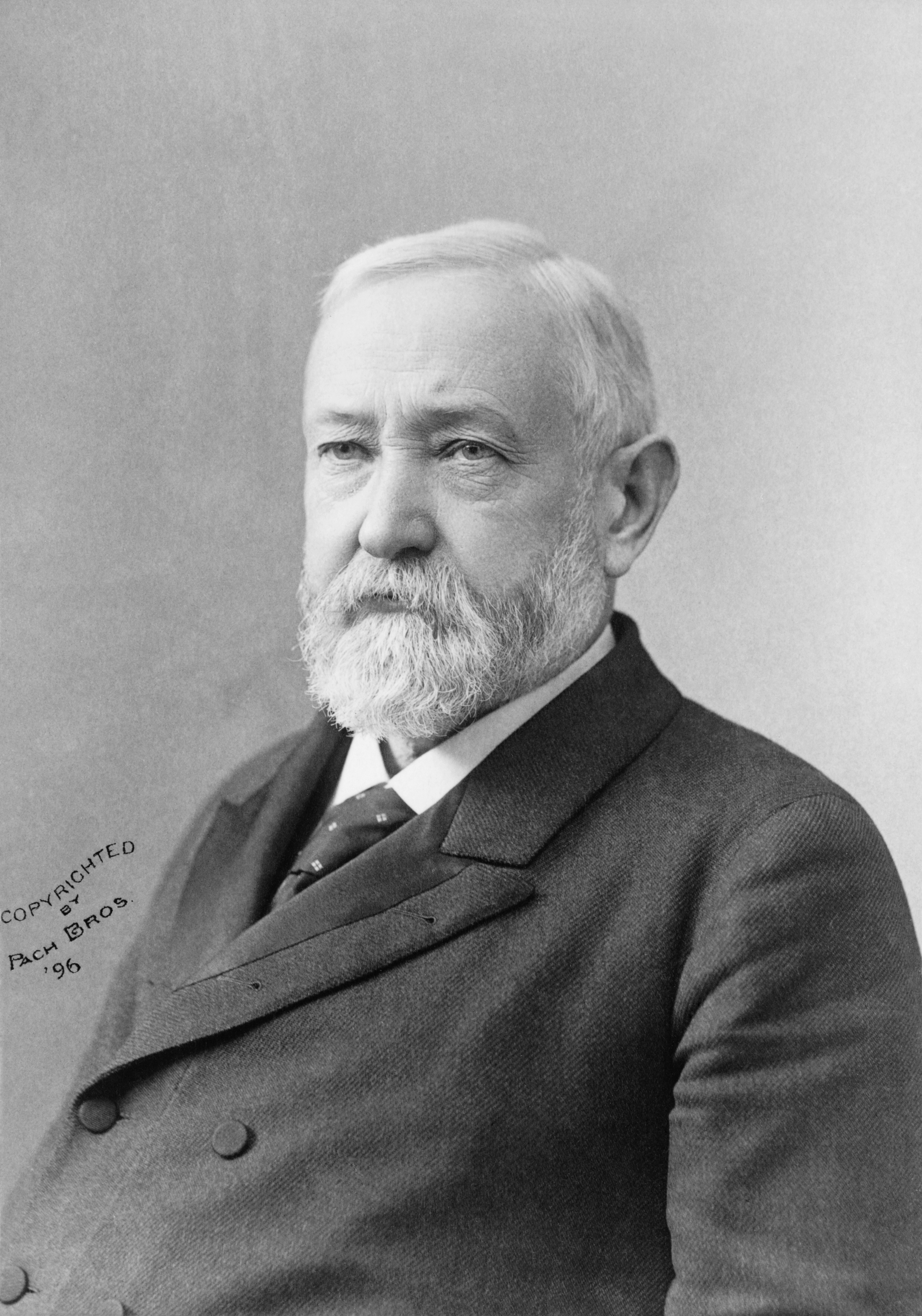
Benjamin Harrison

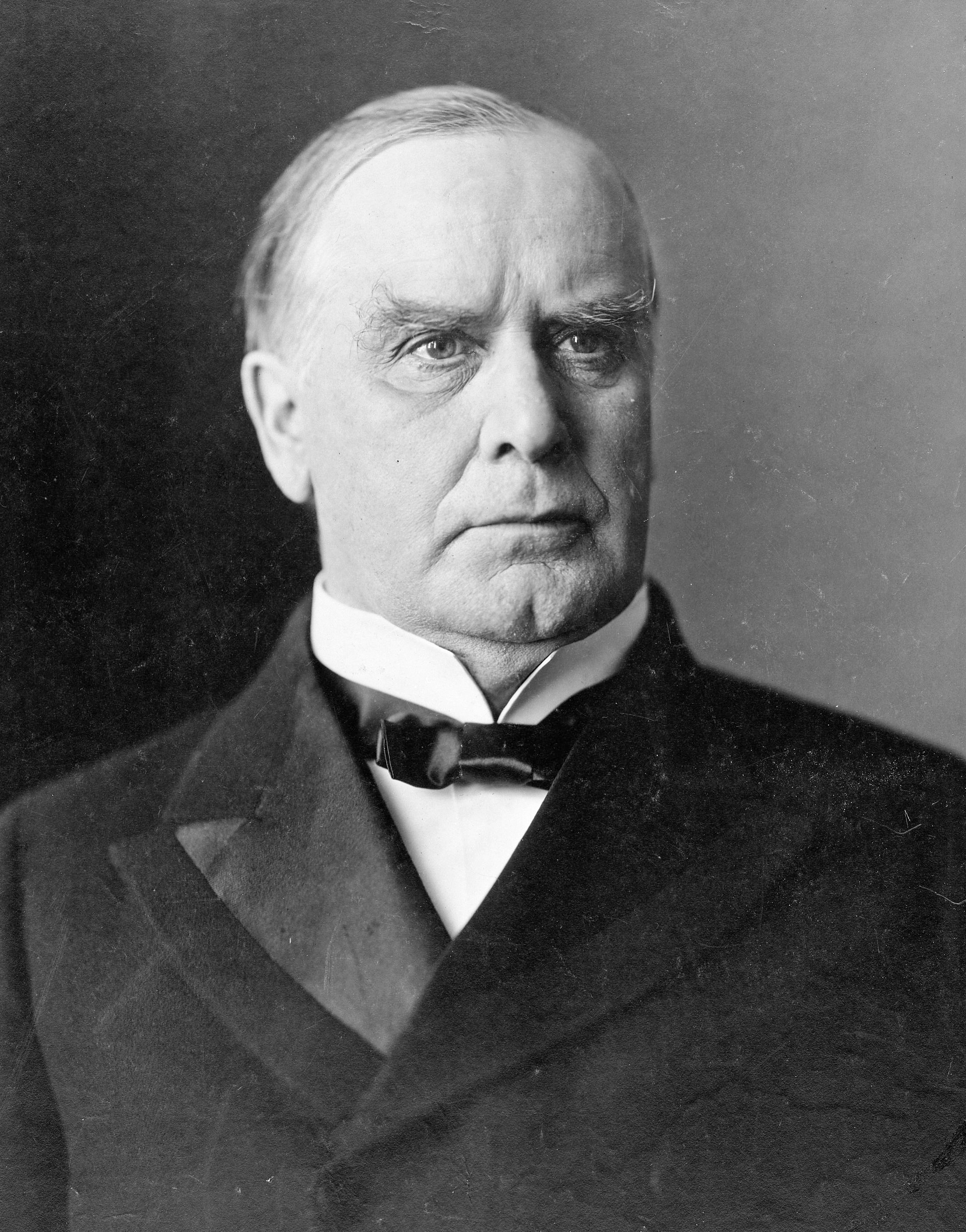
William McKinley

- January 6 – James W. Bradbury, United States Senator from Maine from 1847 to 1853 (born 1802)
- January 16
  - Murray Hall, born Mary Anderson, bail bondsman and politician (born 1841 in Scotland)
  - Hiram Rhodes Revels, first African American senator (born 1827)
- January 21 – Elisha Gray, inventor and co-founder of Western Electric Manufacturing Company (born 1835)
- January 29 – Alexander H. Jones, Congressional Representative from North Carolina (born 1822)
- February 7 – Rowena Granice Steele, first female novelist in California (born 1824)
- February 18 – Anna Gardner, abolitionist (born 1816)
- March 7 – Ruth Alice Armstrong, American social activist (born 1850)
- March 13 – Benjamin Harrison, 23rd president of the United States from 1889 to 1893 and U.S. Senator from Indiana from 1881 to 1887 (born 1833)
- March 18 – Patrick Donahoe, businessman, publisher of the Boston Catholic newspaper The Pilot (born 1811)
- April 10 – Harriet Newell Kneeland Goff, reformer (born 1828)
- April 19 – Alfred Horatio Belo, newswriter and businessman, founder of The Dallas Morning News (born 1839)
- April 26 – Harriett Ellen Grannis Arey, educator (born 1819)
- June 2 – James A. Herne, playwright and actor (born 1839)
- July 4
  - John Fiske, historian and philosopher (born 1842)
  - Julian Scott, artist and Civil War Medal of Honor recipient (born 1846)
- July 7 – Eva M. Reed, botanist (born ?)
- July 30 – Herbert Baxter Adams, educator and historian (born 1850)
- August 4 – Harriet Pritchard Arnold, author (born 1858)
- August 24 – Clara Maass, nurse (born 1876)
- September 14 – William McKinley, 25th president of the United States from 1897 to 1901 (born 1843)
- October 10 – Lorenzo Snow, 5th president of the Church of Jesus Christ of Latter-day Saints (born 1814)
- October 21 – James A. Walker, Confederate general and US Congressman (born 1832)
- October 29 – Leon Czolgosz, assassin of President William McKinley (born 1873)
- November 8 – Mary Ann Bickerdyke, nurse and hospital administrator for Union soldiers (born 1817)
- November 26 – John Denny, buffalo soldier and Medal of Honor recipient (born 1846)
- November 27 – Clement Studebaker, automobile manufacturer (born 1831)

== See also ==
- List of American films of 1901
- Timeline of United States history (1900–1929)
