= 1950 in the United States =

- Decades: 1930s; 1940s; 1950s; 1960s; 1970s
- See also: History of the United States (1945–1964); Timeline of United States history (1950–1969); List of years in the United States

Events from the year 1950 in the United States.

== Incumbents ==
=== Federal government ===
- President: Harry S. Truman (D-Missouri)
- Vice President: Alben W. Barkley (D-Kentucky)
- Chief Justice: Fred M. Vinson (Kentucky)
- Speaker of the House of Representatives: Sam Rayburn (D-Texas)
- Senate Majority Leader: Scott W. Lucas (D-Illinois)
- Congress: 81st

==== State governments ====
Governors and lieutenant governors

=== Governors ===
- Governor of Alabama: Jim Folsom (Democratic)
- Governor of Arizona: Dan Edward Garvey (Democratic)
- Governor of Arkansas: Sid McMath (Democratic)
- Governor of California: Earl Warren (Republican)
- Governor of Colorado: William Lee Knous (Democratic) (until April 15), Walter Walford Johnson (Democratic) (starting April 15)
- Governor of Connecticut: Chester Bowles (Democratic)
- Governor of Delaware: Elbert N. Carvel (Democratic)
- Governor of Florida: Fuller Warren (Democratic)
- Governor of Georgia: Herman Talmadge (Democratic)
- Governor of Idaho: C. A. Robins (Republican)
- Governor of Illinois: Adlai E. Stevenson II (Democratic)
- Governor of Indiana: Henry F. Schricker (Democratic)
- Governor of Iowa: William S. Beardsley (Republican)
- Governor of Kansas: Frank Carlson (Republican) (until November 28), Frank L. Hagaman (Republican) (starting November 28)
- Governor of Kentucky: Earle C. Clements (Democratic) (until November 27), Lawrence W. Wetherby (Democratic) (starting November 27)
- Governor of Louisiana: Earl K. Long (Democratic)
- Governor of Maine: Frederick G. Payne (Republican)
- Governor of Maryland: William Preston Lane, Jr. (Democratic)
- Governor of Massachusetts: Paul A. Dever (Democratic)
- Governor of Michigan: G. Mennen Williams (Democratic)
- Governor of Minnesota: Luther W. Youngdahl (Republican)
- Governor of Mississippi: Fielding L. Wright (Democratic)
- Governor of Missouri: Forrest Smith (Democratic)
- Governor of Montana: John W. Bonner (Democratic)
- Governor of Nebraska: Val Peterson (Republican)
- Governor of Nevada: Vail M. Pittman (Democratic)
- Governor of New Hampshire: Sherman Adams (Republican)
- Governor of New Jersey: Alfred E. Driscoll (Republican)
- Governor of New Mexico: Thomas J. Mabry (Democratic)
- Governor of New York: Thomas Dewey (Republican)
- Governor of North Carolina: W. Kerr Scott (Democratic)
- Governor of North Dakota: Fred G. Aandahl (Republican)
- Governor of Ohio: Frank J. Lausche (Democratic)
- Governor of Oklahoma: Roy J. Turner (Democratic)
- Governor of Oregon: Douglas McKay (Republican)
- Governor of Pennsylvania: James H. Duff (Republican)
- Governor of Rhode Island: John Orlando Pastore (Democratic) (until December 19), John S. McKiernan (Democratic) (starting December 19)
- Governor of South Carolina: Strom Thurmond (Democratic)
- Governor of South Dakota: George T. Mickelson (Republican)
- Governor of Tennessee: Gordon Browning (Democratic)
- Governor of Texas: Allan Shivers (Democratic)
- Governor of Utah: J. Bracken Lee (Republican)
- Governor of Vermont: Ernest W. Gibson, Jr. (Republican) (until January 16), Harold J. Arthur (Republican) (starting January 16)
- Governor of Virginia: William M. Tuck (Democratic) (until January 18), John S. Battle (Democratic) (starting January 18)
- Governor of Washington: Arthur B. Langlie (Republican)
- Governor of West Virginia: Okey L. Patteson (Democratic)
- Governor of Wisconsin: Oscar Rennebohm (Republican)
- Governor of Wyoming: Arthur G. Crane (Republican)

=== Lieutenant governors ===
- Lieutenant Governor of Alabama: James C. Inzer (Democratic)
- Lieutenant Governor of Arkansas: Nathan Green Gordon (Democratic)
- Lieutenant Governor of California: Goodwin Knight (Republican)
- Lieutenant Governor of Colorado:
  - until April 15: Walter Walford Johnson (Democratic)
  - April 15-month and day unknown: Charles P. Murphy (Republican)
  - starting month and day unknown: Gordon L. Allott (Republican)
- Lieutenant Governor of Connecticut: William T. Carroll (Democratic)
- Lieutenant Governor of Delaware: Alexis I. du Pont Bayard (Democratic)
- Lieutenant Governor of Georgia: Marvin Griffin (Democratic)
- Lieutenant Governor of Idaho: Donald S. Whitehead (Republican)
- Lieutenant Governor of Illinois: Sherwood Dixon (Democratic)
- Lieutenant Governor of Indiana: John A. Watkins (Democratic)
- Lieutenant Governor of Iowa: Kenneth A. Evans (Republican)
- Lieutenant Governor of Kansas: Frank L. Hagaman (Republican) (until month and day unknown), vacant (starting month and day unknown)
- Lieutenant Governor of Kentucky: Lawrence Wetherby (Democratic) (until November 27), vacant (starting November 27)
- Lieutenant Governor of Louisiana: William J. Dodd (Democratic)
- Lieutenant Governor of Massachusetts: Charles F. Sullivan (Democratic)
- Lieutenant Governor of Michigan: John W. Connolly (Democratic)
- Lieutenant Governor of Minnesota: C. Elmer Anderson (Republican)
- Lieutenant Governor of Mississippi: Sam Lumpkin (Democratic)
- Lieutenant Governor of Missouri: James T. Blair, Jr. (Democratic)
- Lieutenant Governor of Montana: Paul Cannon (Democratic)
- Lieutenant Governor of Nebraska: Charles J. Warner (Republican)
- Lieutenant Governor of Nevada: Clifford A. Jones (Democratic)
- Lieutenant Governor of New Mexico: Joseph Montoya (Democratic)
- Lieutenant Governor of New York: Joseph R. Hanley (Republican) (until end of December 31)
- Lieutenant Governor of North Carolina: Hoyt Patrick Taylor (Democratic)
- Lieutenant Governor of North Dakota: Clarence P. Dahl (Republican)
- Lieutenant Governor of Ohio: George D. Nye (Democratic)
- Lieutenant Governor of Oklahoma: James E. Berry (Democratic)
- Lieutenant Governor of Pennsylvania: Daniel B. Strickler (Republican)
- Lieutenant Governor of Rhode Island: John S. McKiernan (Democratic)
- Lieutenant Governor of South Carolina: George Bell Timmerman, Jr. (Democratic)
- Lieutenant Governor of South Dakota: Rex A. Terry (Republican)
- Lieutenant Governor of Tennessee: Walter M. Haynes (Democratic)
- Lieutenant Governor of Texas: vacant
- Lieutenant Governor of Vermont: Harold J. Arthur (Republican) (until January 16), vacant (starting January 16)
- Lieutenant Governor of Virginia: Lewis Preston Collins II (Democratic)
- Lieutenant Governor of Washington: Victor A. Meyers (Democratic)
- Lieutenant Governor of Wisconsin: George M. Smith (Republican)

== Events ==
=== January–March ===
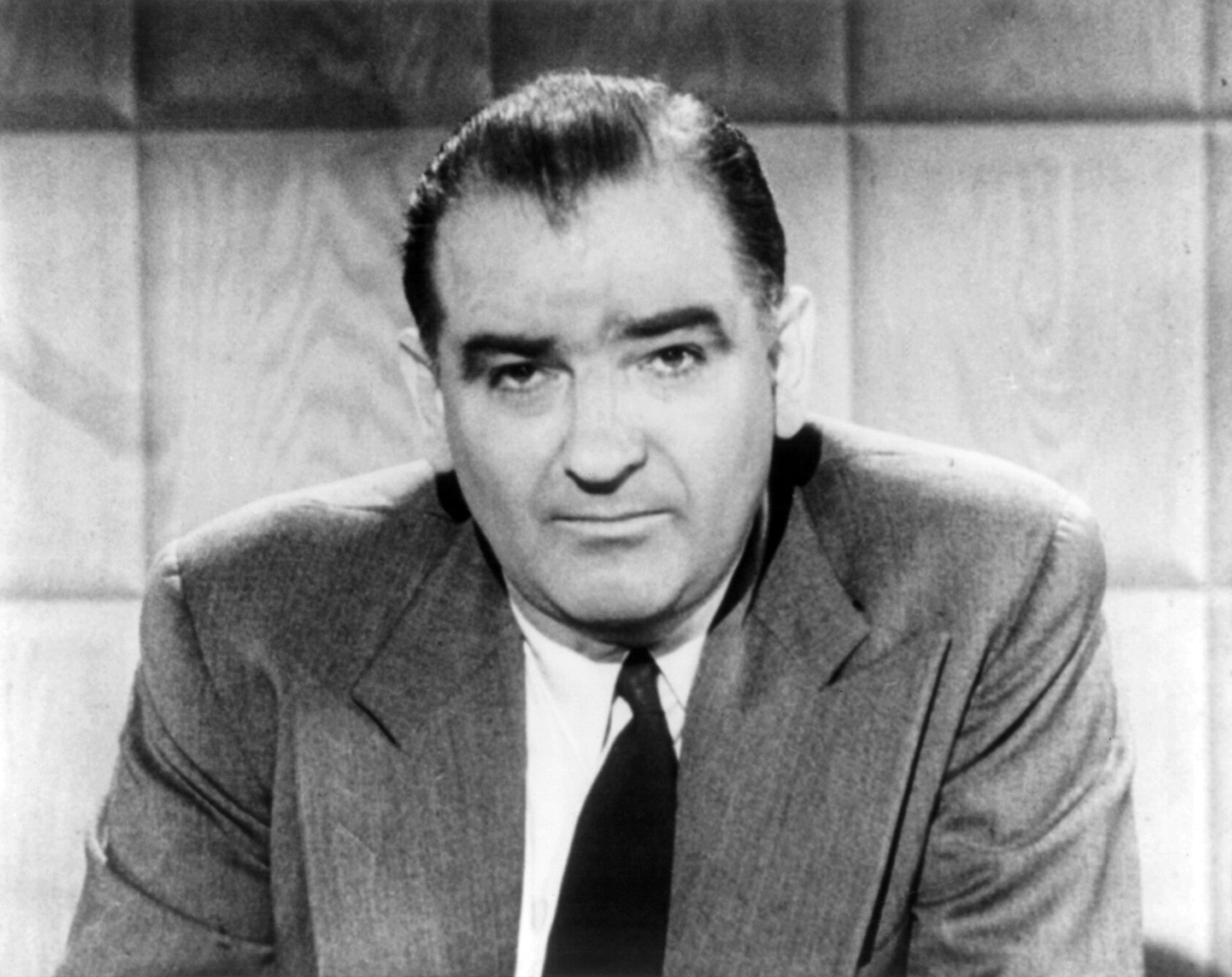
February 9: Joseph McCarthy rises to prominence after claiming the State Department employs communists

- January 5 – U.S. Senator Estes Kefauver introduces a resolution calling for an investigation of organized crime in the U.S.
- January 7 – A fire consumes Mercy Hospital in Davenport, Iowa, killing 41 patients.
- January 12 – Cold War: U.S. Secretary of State Dean Acheson delivers his "Perimeter Speech", outlining the boundary of U.S. security guarantees.
- January 17 – Great Brinks Robbery: 11 thieves steal more than $2,000,000 from an armored car in Boston, Massachusetts.
- January 21 – Accused communist spy Alger Hiss is convicted of perjury.
- January 24 – Cold War: Klaus Fuchs, German émigré and physicist, walks into London's War Office and confesses to being a Soviet spy: for seven years, he passed top secret data on American and British nuclear weapons research to the Soviet Union; formally charged February 2.
- January 31 – President Harry S. Truman orders the development of the hydrogen bomb, in response to the detonation of the Soviet Union's first atomic bomb in 1949.
- February 4 – Ingrid Bergman's illegitimate child arouses ire in the U.S.
- February 9 – Second Red Scare: In his speech to the Republican Women's Club at the McClure Hotel in Wheeling, West Virginia, Senator Joseph McCarthy accuses the U.S. State Department of being filled with 205 Communists.
- February 12 – Albert Einstein warns that nuclear war could lead to mutual destruction.
- February 13
  - The U.S. Army begins to deploy anti-aircraft cannons to protect nuclear stations and military targets.
  - The U.S. Air Force loses a Convair B-36 bomber carrying an Mk-4 atomic bomb off the west coast of Canada, producing the world's first Broken Arrow.
- February 15 – Walt Disney releases his twelfth animated feature film, Cinderella, in Hollywood. It is the first singular feature project his studio has produced since 1942's Bambi, following a string of six anthology films released to recoup losses due to World War II, and Disney's biggest commercial hit since 1937's Snow White and the Seven Dwarfs.
- March 1 – Klaus Fuchs is convicted in London of spying against both the UK and the United States for the Soviet Union, by giving to the latter top secret atomic bomb data.
- March 17 – University of California, Berkeley researchers announce the creation of element 98, which they have named "californium".
- March 22 – Frank La Salle is arrested in California for the abduction of Florence Sally Horner since 1948.
- March 23 – The 22nd Academy Awards ceremony, hosted by Paul Douglas, is held at RKO Pantages Theatre in Hollywood, Los Angeles. Robert Rossen's All The King's Men wins Best Picture, while Joseph L. Mankiewicz wins Best Director for A Letter to Three Wives. William Wyler's The Heiress receives and wins the most respective nominations and awards, with eight and four.

=== April–June ===
June 25: North Korea invades South Korea beginning the Korean War

- April 14 – NSC 68 is issued by the United States National Security Council, advocating the development of the hydrogen bomb, increased military aid to America's allies, and the rollback of communist expansion.
- April 25 – The trial of alleged communist spy Judith Coplon commences in New York City.
- May 1 – First African American winner of a Pulitzer Prize: Gwendolyn Brooks wins the Pulitzer Prize for Poetry for her 1949 volume Annie Allen.
- May 9 – L. Ron Hubbard publishes Dianetics: The Modern Science of Mental Health.
- May 11 – The Kefauver Committee hearings into U.S. organized crime begin.
- May 14 – The Huntsville Times runs the headline, "Dr. von Braun Says Rocket Flights Possible to Moon".
- May 25
  - The Brooklyn–Battery Tunnel is formally opened to traffic in New York City.
  - 1950 Chicago streetcar crash: a collision and explosion kills 34.
- June 1 – Mauna Loa in Hawaii starts erupting.
- June 5 – Sweatt v. Painter decided in the Supreme Court of the United States, challenging the "separate but equal" doctrine of racial segregation in education.
- June 22 – Red Channels: The Report of Communist Influence in Radio and Television is published.
- June 25 – Korean War: North Korean troops cross the 38th parallel into South Korea.
- June 27 – Korean War: U.S. President Harry S. Truman orders American military forces to aid in the defense of South Korea.
- June 28 – Korean War: North Korean forces capture Seoul.
- June 29 – United States v England (1950 FIFA World Cup): The United States men's national soccer team defeats England 1–0 in the 1950 FIFA World Cup in Brazil (Group 2 round).

=== July–September ===
- July 8 – G. Mennen Williams, the Governor of Michigan, is attacked and briefly held hostage while visiting Marquette Branch Prison, as part of an inmate escape plot.
- August 5 – A bomb-laden B-29 Superfortress crashes into a residential area in California; 17 are killed and 68 injured.
- August 8 – Winston Churchill expresses support for the idea of a pan-European army allied with Canada and the United States.
- August 23 – Legendary African American singer-actor Paul Robeson, whose passport has recently been revoked because of his alleged Communist affiliations, meets with U.S. officials in an effort to get it reinstated. He is unsuccessful, and it is not reinstated until 1958.
- August 25 – Althea Gibson becomes the first African American woman to compete at the U.S. National Championships (tennis).
- September 4
  - The comic strip Beetle Bailey is created by Mort Walker.
  - Darlington Raceway is the site of the inaugural Southern 500, the first 500-mile NASCAR race.
- September 7 – The game show Truth or Consequences debuts on television.
- September 8 – The Defense Production Act is enacted into law in the United States, shaping American military contracting for the next sixty years.
- September 9 – The U.S. state of California celebrates its centennial anniversary.
- September 15 – Korean War: Battle of Inchon – Allied troops commanded by Douglas MacArthur land in Inchon, occupied by North Korea, to begin a U.N. counteroffensive.
- September 30 – NSC 68 is approved by President Harry S. Truman, setting United States foreign policy for the next 20 years.

=== October–December ===
Peanuts

- October 2 – The comic strip Peanuts by Charles M. Schulz is first published in seven U.S. newspapers.
- October 7
  - The Agate Pass Bridge opens for traffic in Washington State.
  - The New York Yankees defeat the Philadelphia Phillies, 4 games to 0, to win their 13th World Series Title.
- October 11 – The Federal Communications Commission issues the first license to broadcast television in color, to CBS (RCA will successfully dispute and block the license from taking effect, however).
- October 15 – The second Tacoma Narrows Bridge opens.
- October 30 – The Jayuya Uprising is started by Puerto Rican Nationalists against the United States.
- November 1 – Puerto Rican nationalists Griselio Torresola and Oscar Collazo attempt to assassinate U.S. President Harry S. Truman, who is staying at the Blair-Lee House in Washington, D.C. during White House repairs.
- November 8 – Korean War: While in an F-80, United States Air Force Lt. Russell J. Brown intercepts two North Korean MiG-15s near the Yalu River and shoots them down in the first jet-to-jet dogfight in history.
- November 10 – A U.S. Air Force B-50 Superfortress bomber, experiencing an in-flight emergency, jettisons and detonates a Mark 4 nuclear bomb over Quebec, Canada (the device lacked its plutonium core).
- November 11 – The Mattachine Society is founded in Los Angeles as the first gay liberation organization.
- November 22 – Shirley Temple announces her retirement from show business at the age of 22.
- November 24–25 – Great Appalachian Storm of 1950: A phenomenal winter storm ravages the northeastern United States, brings 30 to 50 inches of snow, temperatures below zero, and kills 323 people.
- November 26 – Korean War: Troops from the People's Republic of China move into North Korea and launch a massive counterattack against South Korean and American forces at Chosin, dashing any hopes for a quick end to the conflict.
- November 29
  - Korean War: North Korean and Chinese troops force a retreat of United Nations forces from North Korea.
  - The National Council of the Churches of Christ in the USA is founded.
- November 30 – Douglas MacArthur threatens to use nuclear weapons in Korea.
- December 4 – The 1949 Smith Act trial of Communist Party leaders ("Foley Square trial") commences review in the Supreme Court of the United States, as Dennis v. United States.
- December 12 – Paula Ackerman becomes the first woman in the United States to serve a congregation as a Rabbi.
- December 15 – Lavender Scare: A Senate subcommittee report on Employment of Homosexuals and Other Sex Perverts in Government (chair: Clyde R. Hoey) recommending against Federal employment of homosexuals, is made public.
- December 16 – The Office of Defense Mobilization is established in the United States.

=== Undated ===
- President Harry S. Truman sends United States military advisors to Vietnam to aid French forces.
- The first TV remote control, Zenith Radio's Lazy Bones, is marketed.
- Summer: An epidemic of polio breaks out on Wythe County, Virginia. 189 cases are reported, with 17 fatalities.

=== Ongoing ===
- Cold War (1947–1991)
- Second Red Scare (1947–1957)
- Marshall Plan (1948–1951)
- Korean War (1950–1953)

== Births ==
- January 1 – Steve Ripley, country singer (d. 2019)
- January 2
  - Grant Adcox, race car driver (d. 1989)
  - David Shifrin, classical clarinetist
- January 3 – Victoria Principal, actress (Dallas)
- January 4
  - Michael R. Blanchfield, soldier (d. 1969)
  - John Louis Evans, murderer (executed 1983)
  - Carol J. Greenhouse, anthropologist
- January 6
  - Louis Freeh, Director of the FBI
  - Thomas J. Pickard, acting director of the FBI
- January 7 – Ross Grimsley, baseball player and coach
- January 8 – Michael Kearns, actor
- January 9 – David Johansen, musician and actor (d. 2025)
- January 10
  - Roy Blunt, U.S. Senator from Missouri from 2011 to 2023
  - Randy Jones, baseball player (d. 2025)
  - Ernie Wasson, gardener and writer
- January 11 – Joel Seligman, author
- January 12 – Sheila Jackson Lee, African-American politician (d. 2024)
- January 15 – Bob Krause, politician
- January 19 – Jon Matlack, baseball player and coach
- January 20 – Edward Hirsch, poet
- January 23 – Suzanne Scotchmer, economist and academic (d. 2014)
- January 24 – Gennifer Flowers, actress, connected to Bill Clinton
- January 26 – Jack Youngblood, American football player, sportscaster and actor
- January 29
  - Tom Brown Jr., naturalist and tracker (d. 2024)
  - Max Carl, singer-songwriter, guitarist and keyboard player
- January 30 – Trinidad Silva, actor (d. 1988)
- January 31 – Fred Karger, political consultant
- February 1 – Mike Campbell, musician
- February 4 Laurence Bergreen, historian and author
- February 5
  - Terry Beasley, American football player (d. 2024)
  - Jonathan Freeman, actor and puppeteer
- February 6
  - Natalie Cole, singer (d. 2015)
  - Timothy Michael Dolan, Roman Catholic Cardinal, Archbishop of New York
- February 7 – Karen Joy Fowler, author
- February 9
  - Richard F. Colburn, Republican (d. 2024)
  - James Luna, performance artist (d. 2018)
- February 12 – Margaret Warner, Senior correspondent of PBS
- February 15 – Donna Hanover, journalist
- February 17
  - Mark Bittman, journalist
  - Rickey Medlocke, musician
- February 19 – Donald Sanborn, reactor
- February 23 – Elizabeth Streb, choreographer
- February 24 – Steve McCurry, photographer and journalist
- February 26 – Bill Ritter, news anchor
- March 1
  - Dave Marsh, music critic (d. 2026)
  - Phil Alden Robinson, film director and screenwriter
- March 2 – Karen Carpenter, pop singer and drummer (d. 1983)
- March 3 – Mark Ciavarella, judge
- March 4 – Rick Perry, 47th governor of Texas
- March 6 – Al Milgrom, comic book writer
- March 7
  - Billy Joe DuPree, American football tight end
  - Franco Harris, American football running back (d. 2022)
  - Mark Pinter, actor
- March 10 – Catherine Pugh, Democratic politician and mayor of Baltimore
- March 11 – Steven Nock, researcher, author, and university professor (d. 2008)
- March 15
  - Paul Gerken, tennis player
  - Thommie Walsh, dancer, choreographer, director and author (d. 2007)
- March 16 – Jed Babbin, lawyer
- March 17
  - Michael Been, rock musician (d. 2010)
  - Linda Wolf, photographer and author
- March 19
  - Zachary W. Carter, lawyer
  - Leon McQuay, American football player (d. 1995)
- March 20
  - William Hurt, actor (d. 2022)
  - Tom Towles, actor (d. 2015)
- March 25 – Francis Boyle, human rights lawyer (d. 2025)
- March 26 – Alan Silvestri, composer and conductor
- March 27
  - Robert DeLeo, politician
  - Maria Ewing, operatic soprano (d. 2022)
- March 28 – Jeffrey Miller, Kent State University shooting victim (d. 1970)
- March 30 – Gerry Connolly, politician (d. 2025)
- March 31 – Ed Marinaro, American football player and actor (Hill Street Blues)
- April 1 – Samuel Alito, Associate Justice of the Supreme Court of the U.S. from 2006
- April 2
  - Erik Buell, motorcycle racer
  - Ruth Wilson Gilmore, prison abolitionist and scholar
  - Lynn Westmoreland, politician, U.S. House of Representatives from Georgia
- April 7
  - Patricia Mauceri, actress
  - Richard Dien Winfield, philosopher
- April 8 – Carmen Twillie, actress and singer
- April 9 – Kenneth Cockrell, astronaut
- April 10 – Ken Griffey, Sr., baseball player
- April 12
  - David Cassidy, singer (d. 2017)
  - Tom Werner, TV producer and businessman
- April 16
  - David Graf, actor (d. 2001)
  - Tony Huston, actor
- April 17 – Bruce McNall, businessman
- April 18 – Kenny Ortega, producer, director and choreographer
- April 19 – Lani Guinier, law professor (d. 2022)
- April 20
  - Steve Erickson, novelist
  - Milt Wilcox, baseball player
- April 21
  - Bobby Hutton, activist (d. 1968)
  - Dale Patchett, politician (Florida) (d. 2023)
- April 25 – Lenora Fulani, African-American presidential candidate
- April 26 – Glenn Patrick, ice hockey player
- April 28 – Bruce H. Mann, legal scholar
- April 29 – Debbie Stabenow, U.S. Senator from Michigan from 2001 to 2025
- April 30
  - Patrice Donnelly, actress
  - Carl Stokes, politician (Baltimore)
- May 1
  - John Diehl, actor
  - Swanee Hunt, lecturer
- May 2
  - Lou Gramm, rock singer-songwriter
  - Moondog Rex, professional wrestler (d. 2019)
- May 3 – Jeffrey Sweet, writer and theater historian
- May 4 – Hilly Hicks, character actor
- May 5
  - Joseph Abboud, fashion designer
  - Elaine Fuchs, cell biologist
  - Todd Strasser, writer
- May 6
  - Jeffery Deaver, crime writer
  - Jamie Gorelick, lawyer
  - Joel Hyatt, entrepreneur
- May 7
  - Prairie Prince, drummer
  - Tim Russert, journalist (Meet the Press) (d. 2008)
- May 8 – Mark Blankfield, actor
- May 9
  - James Butts, triple jumper
  - Jorie Graham, poet
  - Tom Petersson, bass player and songwriter
- May 11
  - Dane Iorg, baseball player
  - John F. Kelly, 5th United States Secretary of Homeland Security
- May 12
  - Bruce Boxleitner, actor
  - Billy Squier, musician
- May 13
  - Joe Johnston, film director
  - Bobby Valentine, baseball manager
  - Stevie Wonder, musician, singer, songwriter, record producer and multi-instrumentalist
- May 14 – Jill Stein, Green Party nominee for President of the United States in the 2012 and 2016 elections
- May 15
  - Nicholas Hammond, American-Australian actor
  - Jim Simons, golfer (d. 2005)
- May 18 – Mark Mothersbaugh, musician
- May 19 – George Leo Thomas, prelate of the Catholic Church
- May 20 – Alan Zweibel, television writer
- May 21 – Jeanne Moos, news correspondent
- May 23
  - William Barr, United States Attorney-General
  - Linda Thompson (actress), songwriter
- May 25 – Ed Emery, politician, Missouri State Senate (d. 2021)
- May 26 – David Ignatius, journalist and novelist
- May 28
  - Denny Delk, actor and voice actor
  - Arthur Firstenberg, author
  - Kamala, professional wrestler (d. 2020)
- May 29 – Rebbie Jackson, singer
- May 31 – Gregory Harrison, actor and director
- June 1
  - John M. Jackson, actor
  - Michael McDowell, novelist and screenwriter (d. 1999)
- June 3
  - Melissa Mathison, screenwriter (d. 2015)
  - Ann Pennington, model
  - Suzi Quatro, singer, songwriter
  - Deniece Williams, singer
  - Robert Z’Dar, actor (d. 2015)
- June 6 – Andrew Napolitano, columnist
- June 7 – Howard Finkel, ring announcer (d. 2020)
- June 8 – Kathy Baker, actress
- June 9 – Keith Kauffman, race car driver
- June 10 – Gary Westfall, physicist
- June 12
  - Bun E. Carlos, drummer
  - Sonia Manzano, actress
- June 16 – Jerry Petrowski, politician and farmer
- June 17
  - David Boggs, computer scientist (d. 2022)
  - William P. Callahan, religious leader
- June 18
  - Mike Johanns, U.S. Senator from Nebraska
  - Joe Sam Queen, North Carolina politician
- June 19 – Ann Wilson, singer, musician ((Heart))
- June 22 – Benedict Gross, mathematician (d. 2025)
- June 23
  - Dave Butz, American football player (d. 2022)
  - Tracy Potter, historian and politician
- June 27 – Michael O'Brien, photographer
- June 28 – Steve Downes, DJ and voice actor
- June 29 – Don Moen, Christian musician
- July 1
  - David Duke, politician and Grand Wizard of the Ku Klux Klan
  - Ricardo Montano, legislator
- July 4 – Steven Sasson, electrical engineer
- July 5
  - Huey Lewis, actor, musician and songwriter
  - Michael Monarch, guitarist, songwriter and producer
- July 9 – Gwen Guthrie, pianist and singer-songwriter (d. 1999)
- July 11 – Michael C. Stenger, law enforcement officer (d. 2022)
- July 16 – Gary Indiana, writer (d. 2024)
- July 17 – Peter Neufeld, lawyer
- July 18
  - Glenn Hughes, vocalist (The Village People) (d. 2001)
  - Mark Souder, politician and businessman from Indiana (d. 2022)
  - Mark Udall, U.S. Senator from Colorado from 2009 to 2015
- July 19 – Freddy Moore, musician (d. 2022)
- July 20 – William Knox Schroeder, Kent State University shooting victim (d. 1970)
- July 30 – Frank Stallone, actor
- August 1
  - Bunkhouse Buck, professional wrestler
  - Roy Williams, basketball coach
- August 2 – Lance Ito, judge
- August 3
  - John Landis, film director
  - Jo Marie Payton, actress
- August 7 – Alan Keyes, politician
- August 8 – Mutulu Shakur, activist and convicted robber (d. 2023)
- August 11
  - Erik Brann, musician (Iron Butterfly) (d. 2003)
  - Steve Wozniak, inventor
- August 12
  - Jim Beaver, actor, playwright, screenwriter and film historian
  - George McGinnis, basketball player (d. 2023)
- August 15
  - Tom Kelly, baseball player and manager
  - Andres Serrano, photographer
- August 21 – Arthur Bremer, attempted assassin of George Wallace
- August 22
  - Scooter Libby, lawyer and political adviser
  - Karen Yarbrough, politician (d. 2024)
- August 24
  - John Banaszak, football player and coach
  - Tim D. White, paleoanthropologist and academic
- August 25 – Charles Fambrough, musician and composer (d. 2011)
- August 26
  - Carl Deuker, author
  - Benjamin Hendrickson, actor (d. 2006)
- August 31 – Dean Barkley, U.S. Senator from Minnesota from 2002 to 2003
- September 1 – Phil McGraw, psychologist and TV host
- September 2
  - Rosanna DeSoto, actress
  - Harvey Levin, founder of TMZ
- September 7 – Walter Steding, artist and musician (d. 2025)
- September 8 – Jim Mattis, 26th United States Secretary of Defense
- September 11 – Amy Madigan, actress
- September 15 – Mike Nifong North Carolina district attorney disbarred for misconduct in the Duke lacrosse case
- September 16
  - Henry Louis Gates Jr., African-American literary critic
  - Loyd Grossman, television presenter and chef
- September 17 – Robert Slavin, psychologist (d. 2021)
- September 19 – Joan Lunden, television broadcaster and journalist (Good Morning America)
- September 21
  - Bill Murray, comedian and actor
  - David Frawley, author
- September 23 – Tim Keller, pastor (d. 2023)
- September 24 – Alan Colmes, TV/radio host and political commentator (d. 2017)
- September 28
  - Christina Hoff Sommers, author and philosopher
  - John Sayles, director and screenwriter
- September 29 – Leroy Jones, American footballer (d. 2021)
- October 3
  - Pamela Hensley, actress
  - Phyllis Nelson, singer-songwriter (d. 1998)
- October 5
  - Jeff Conaway, actor (Taxi) (d. 2011)
  - Dick Jauron, American football player and coach (d. 2025)
- October 9
  - Everett Peck, illustrator, comics artist, cartoonist and animator (d. 2022)
  - Jody Williams, teacher, aid worker and recipient of the Nobel Peace Prize
- October 11 – Patty Murray, U.S. Senator from Washington from 1993
- October 12 – Edward Bloor, novelist
- October 14 – Joey Travolta, actor
- October 16
  - Cecil Bothwell, atheist writer, politician
  - Angry Grandpa, internet personality (d. 2017)
- October 20 – Tom Petty, rock singer-songwriter (d. 2017)
- October 22
  - Bill Owens, 40th Governor of Colorado
  - Patricia Parris, actress
- October 24
  - Rawly Eastwick, baseball player
  - Steven Greenberg, singer-songwriter and producer
  - Tom Myers, American football player
- October 25 – Mark L. Taylor, actor
- October 30 – Louise DuArt, comedian and impersonator
- October 31 – Jane Pauley, television broadcast journalist (The Today Show)
- November 1
  - Robert B. Laughlin, physicist, Nobel Prize laureate
  - Dan Peek, musician (America) (d. 2011)
- November 4 – Charles Frazier, novelist
- November 6 – Kenny Marks, Christian musician (d. 2018)
- November 8 – Mary Hart, television personality
- November 10
  - Debra Hill, producer (d. 2005)
  - Bob Orton, Jr., professional wrestler
- November 12 – Barbara Fairchild, singer-songwriter
- November 13 – Mary Lou Metzger, singer and dancer
- November 16 – David Leisure, actor
- November 21 – David Williams, singer, songwriter, musician and producer (d. 2009)
- November 22
  - Jim Lang, composer
  - Lyman Bostock, baseball player (d. 1978)
- November 23 – Chuck Schumer, U.S. Senator from New York from 1999
- November 24 – Stanley Livingston, actor
- November 28
  - Ed Harris, actor, screenwriter and director
  - Russell Alan Hulse, physicist, Nobel Prize laureate
  - Kenneth Fisher, financial manager and journalist
- November 30 – Paul Westphal, basketball player and coach (d. 2021)
- December 1 – Richard Keith (b. Keith Thibodeaux), child actor
- December 2 – Bob Kevoian, radio host
- December 3 – Asa Hutchinson, 46th Governor of Arkansas
- December 10
  - John Boozman, U.S. Senator from Arkansas from 2011
  - Gregg Berger, voice actor
- December 12 – Darleen Carr, actress
- December 13
  - Brad Dusek, American football player (d. 2024)
  - Wendie Malick, American-Canadian actress
- December 15 – Sylvester James Gates, theoretical physicist
- December 17 – Laurence F. Johnson, futurist and educator
- December 18 – Leonard Maltin, film critic
- December 20 – Don Heffington, percussionist and songwriter (d. 2021)
- December 23 – Michael C. Burgess, politician
- December 24 – Deborah J. Glick, democratic member
- December 25 – Ed Hochuli, American football official
- December 28 – Alex Chilton, rock musician (The Box Tops) (d. 2010)
- December 29 – Jon Polito, actor (d. 2016)

== Deaths ==
- January 2 – Anthony Prusinski, politician (b. 1901)
- January 15 – Henry H. Arnold, five-star general (b. 1886)
- January 22 – Alan Hale, Sr., actor (b. 1892)
- February 7 – William Murphy, Roman Catholic bishop (b. 1885)
- February 11 – Kiki Cuyler, baseball player (Chicago Cubs) and a member of the MLB Hall of Fame (b. 1898)
- February 25 – George Minot, physician, recipient of the Nobel Prize in Physiology or Medicine (b. 1885)
- February 27 – Harold Clarke Goddard, Shakespearean scholar (b. 1878)
- March 5 – Sid Grauman, theater entrepreneur (b. 1879)
- March 11 – Heinrich Mann, German writer, died in Santa Monica, California (b. 1871)
- March 26 – Dink Trout, actor (b. 1898)
- April 1 – Charles R. Drew, African American physician, pioneer in blood transfusion, died as result of automobile accident (b. 1904)
- April 7 – Walter Huston, actor (b. 1883)
- April 11 – Bainbridge Colby, United States Secretary of State (b. 1869)
- April 16 – Henry J. Knauf, politician (b. 1891)
- April 26 – G. Murray Hulbert, politician (b. 1881)
- April 27 – Hobart Cavanaugh, character actor (b. 1886)
- May 1 – Lothrop Stoddard, eugenicist (b. 1883)
- May 10 – Belle da Costa Greene, librarian, bibliographer and archivist (b. 1879)
- May 20 – John Gould Fletcher, poet (b. 1886)
- May 24 – Lloyd French, film director (b. 1900)
- June 22 – Jane Cowl, actress (b. 1883)
- July 7 – Fats Navarro, jazz trumpet player (b. 1923)
- July 8 – Helen Holmes, actress (b. 1893)
- July 10 – Richard Maury, American naturalized Argentine engineer (b. 1882)
- July 11 – Buddy DeSylva, songwriter (b. 1895)
- July 12 – Elsie de Wolfe, socialite and interior decorator (b. 1865)
- July 21 – Rex Ingram, director (b. 1892)
- July 26 – Papa Charlie McCoy, Delta blues musician and songwriter (born 1909)
- August 19 – Black Elk, Wičháša Wakȟáŋ (Medicine Man or Holy Man) of the Ogala Teton Lakota (Western Sioux) (b. 1863)
- August 22 – Kirk Bryan, geologist (b. 1888)
- August 23 – Frank Phillips, oil executive (b. 1873)
- August 26 – Ransom E. Olds, automotive pioneer (b. 1864)
- September 10 – Raymond Sommer, race car driver (b. 1906)
- September 16 – Pedro de Cordoba, actor (b. 1881)
- October 11 – Pauline Lord, actress (b. 1890)
- October 13 – Ernest Haycox, writer (b. 1899)
- October 19 – Edna St. Vincent Millay, poet (b. 1892)
- October 20 – Henry L. Stimson, United States Secretary of State (b. 1867)
- October 23 – Al Jolson, musician and actor (b. 1886)
- October 28 – Maurice Costello, actor (b. 1877)
- November 1 – Leslie Coffelt, White House police officer (b. 1910)
- November 4 – Grover Cleveland Alexander, baseball player (Philadelphia Phillies) and a member of the MLB Hall of Fame (b. 1887)
- November 8 – Bernice Herstein, socialite (b. 1918)
- November 9 – Maude Fulton, playwright and actress (b. 1881)
- November 29 – Walter Beech, aviator and aircraft manufacturer (b. 1891)
- December 4 – Jesse L. Brown, first African-American aviator in the United States Navy (killed in action) (b. 1926)
- December 7 – Evelyn Selbie, actress (b. 1871)
- December 11 – Dewey Robinson, actor (b. 1898)
- December 27 – Max Beckmann, German painter and graphic artist, died in New York City, New York (b. 1884)

== See also ==
- List of American films of 1950
- Timeline of United States history (1950–1969)
