= 1900 North Dakota gubernatorial election =

- November 6, 1900
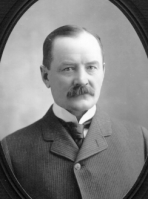

Nominee	Frank White	Max Wipperman
Party	Republican	Democratic
Popular vote	34,052	22,275
Percentage	59.20%	38.72%
- County results White: 50–60% 60–70% 70–80% 80–90% Wipperman: 50–60%
Governor before election
Frederick B. Fancher
Republican
Elected Governor
Frank White
Republican

The 1900 North Dakota gubernatorial election was held on November 6, 1900. Republican nominee Frank White defeated Democratic nominee Max Wipperman with 59.20% of the vote.

== General election ==
=== Candidates ===
- Frank White, Republican
- Max Wipperman, Democratic (Note: Wipperman ran under a fusion ticket between the Democrats and the Populist Party.)

=== Results ===
1900 North Dakota gubernatorial election
Party	Candidate	Votes	%	±%
Republican	Frank White	34,052	59.20	▼0.02
Democratic	Max Wipperman	22,275	38.72	▼2.06
Prohibition	Delevan Carlton	560	0.97	N/A
Socialist	George F. Poague	425	0.74	N/A
Populist	O. G. Major	213	0.37	N/A
Majority		11,777	20.48%	▲2.05
Total votes		57,525	100.00	
Republican hold				
