= 1906 North Dakota gubernatorial election =

- November 6, 1906
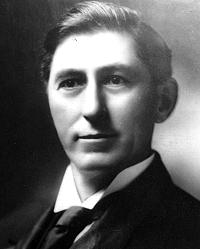

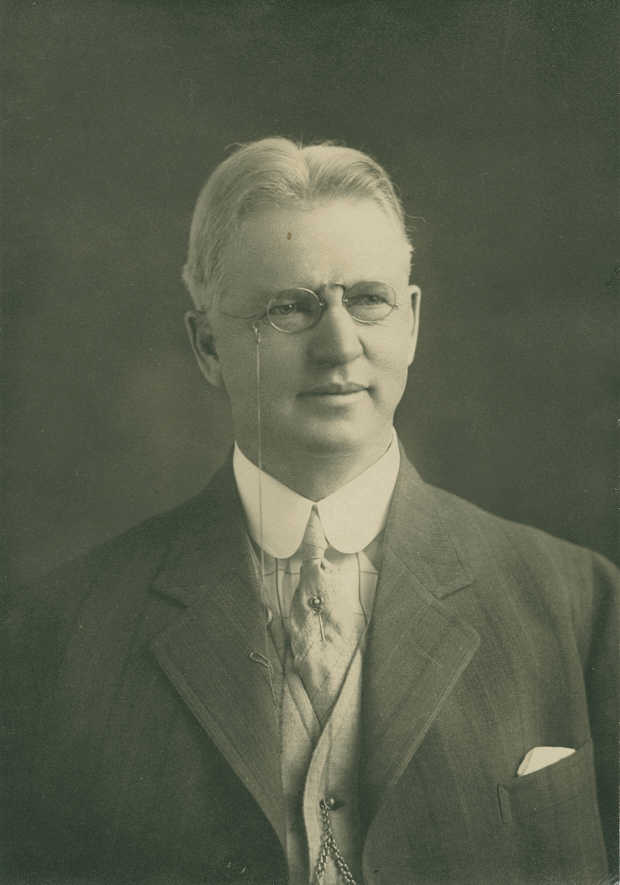
Nominee	John Burke	Elmore Y. Sarles
Party	Democratic	Republican
Popular vote	34,424	29,309
Percentage	53.20%	45.29%
- County results Burke: 40–50% 50–60% 60–70% 70–80% Sarles: 50–60% 60–70% 70–80% 80–90% 90–100% No Vote
Governor before election
Elmore Y. Sarles
Republican
Elected Governor
John Burke
Democratic

The 1906 North Dakota gubernatorial election, sometimes called 'The Revolution of 1906' was held on November 6, 1906. This election marked a major shift in North Dakota politics as the incumbent, Republican Elmore Sarles, was defeated by a 53.20% majority vote for Democrat John Burke, who had garnered bipartisan support across the state of constituents tired of Sarles' administration, which was supported by the Republican political machine run by politician Alexander McKenzie.

== Background ==
Incumbent Elmore Sarles had been a businessman prior to his election as the ninth governor of North Dakota in 1904, taking office in 1905. During his tenure in office, Sarles was frequently criticized for taking positions favoring big businesses, and for publicly drinking while the state constitution had enacted prohibition since its admission into the United States. Furthermore, Sarles was supported by a Republican political machine headed by Alexander McKenzie, who had been known for being a confidant of many top officials, and who had personally selected many candidates who later won state offices.

In the lead-up to the 1906 election, many newspapers began to publish articles and editorials railing against 'McKenzieism', and the Democratic candidate, John Burke, who had initially not wanted to run, used this as a campaign point, becoming very active, and winning over many Progressive Republicans who had been looking to oust the influence of McKenzie and Sarles.

== General election results ==
1906 North Dakota gubernatorial election
Party	Candidate	Votes	%	±%
Democratic	John Burke	34,424	53.20	▲28.55
Republican	Elmore Y. Sarles (incumbent)	29,309	45.29	▼25.42
Socialist	L.F. Dow	978	1.51	▼1.08
Majority		5,115	7.91	▼38.15
Total votes		64,711	100.00	
Democratic gain from Republican				

=== Results by county ===
County	Burke	Sarles	Dow	Votes Total
County	Votes	Votes	Votes	Votes Total
Barnes	1,348	923	46	2,317
Benson	1,062	391	8	1,461
Billings	42	295	3	340
Bottineau	1,672	1,150	84	2,906
Burleigh	489	983	17	1,489
Cass	1,884	2,056	58	3,998
Cavalier	1,574	1,043	27	2,644
Dickey	330	676	18	1,024
Eddy	387	365	10	762
Emmons	274	600	9	883
Foster	617	260	5	882
Grand Forks	3,020	1,050	39	4,109
Griggs	736	238	15	989
Kidder	168	294	7	469
LaMoure	471	687	19	1,177
Logan	59	510	8	577
McHenry	1,014	1,072	42	2,128
McIntosh	19	426	3	448
McKenzie	211	336	12	559
McLean	364	1,636	40	2,040
Mercer	14	325	2	341
Morton	395	1,646	24	2,065
Nelson	849	664	16	1,529
Oliver	113	244	2	359
Pembina	1,607	911	5	2,523
Pierce	973	368	30	1,371
Ramsey	1,537	476	22	2,035
Ransom	488	900	18	1,406
Richland	1,436	993	17	2,446
Rolette	1,020	369	44	1,433
Sargent	515	713	32	1,260
Stark	282	492	7	781
Steele	579	218	6	803
Stutsman	1,177	1,061	14	2,252
Towner	1,192	404	10	1,606
Traill	1,072	534	24	1,630
Walsh	2,239	814	35	3,088
Ward	1,947	1,924	138	4,009
Wells	679	584	21	1,284
Williams	569	678	41	1,288
Total	34,424	29,309	978	64,711
