= Elmore Y. Sarles =

American politician (1859–1929)

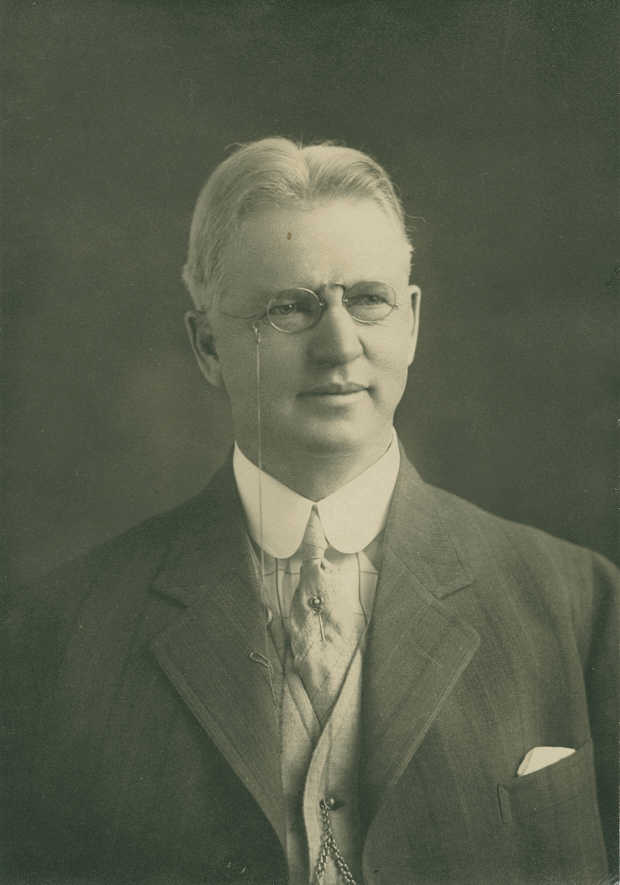

9th Governor of North Dakota
- In office January 4, 1905 – January 9, 1907
- Lieutenant: David Bartlett; Robert S. Lewis
- Preceded by: Frank White
- Succeeded by: John Burke

Mayor of Hillsboro, North Dakota
- In office 1900–1902

Personal details
- Born: January 15, 1859 Wonewoc, Wisconsin
- Died: February 14, 1929 (aged 70) Hillsboro, North Dakota
- Party: Republican

Elmore Yocum Sarles (January 15, 1859 – February 14, 1929) was an American politician who was the ninth governor of North Dakota from 1905 to 1907.

== Biography ==
Born in Wonewoc, Wisconsin, Sarles was educated in the public schools in Prescott, Wisconsin and the Gale College in Galesville, Wisconsin. He arrived in Hillsboro, North Dakota in 1881 where he founded the Traill County Bank and a lumberyard. He married Anna York on January 10, 1886, and had two sons and two daughters. Sarles was also founder and president of The First National Bank of Hillsboro.

== Career ==
Elmore Sarles became the mayor of Hillsboro in 1900 and served one term through 1902. Sarles was elected Governor. "More business in government" was Sarles' motto. There was a surplus of $200,000 in the state treasury when he left the Governor's office.

== Death ==
Sarles died on February 14, 1929, and is buried in Hillsboro Cemetery #1 (Riverside Cemetery) in Hillsboro, North Dakota.

Party political offices
Preceded by Frank White	Republican nominee for Governor of North Dakota; 1904, 1906	Succeeded by C. A. Johnson
Political offices
Preceded by Frank White	Governor of North Dakota; 1905–1907	Succeeded by John Burke
