= 1898 North Dakota gubernatorial election =

- November 8, 1898
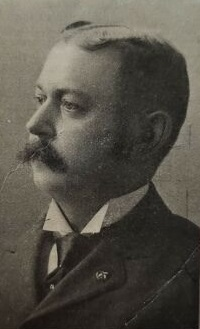

Nominee	Frederick B. Fancher	David M. Holmes
Party	Republican	Democratic
Popular vote	28,308	19,496
Percentage	59.22%	40.78%
- County results Fancher: 50–60% 60–70% 70–80% 80–90% >90% Holmes: 50–60% 60–70%
Governor before election
Joseph M. Devine
Republican
Elected Governor
Frederick B. Fancher
Republican

The 1898 North Dakota gubernatorial election was held on November 8, 1898. Republican nominee Frederick B. Fancher defeated Democratic nominee David M. Holmes with 59.22% of the vote.

== General election ==
=== Candidates ===
- Frederick B. Fancher, Republican
- David M. Holmes, Democratic

=== Results ===
1898 North Dakota gubernatorial election
Party	Candidate	Votes	%	±%
Republican	Frederick B. Fancher	28,308	59.22	▲3.61
Democratic	David M. Holmes	19,496	40.78	N/A
Majority		8,812	18.43	▲7.21
Total votes		47,804	100.00	
Republican hold				
