= Eugene A. Burdick =

American judge (1912–2000)

Eugene Allan Burdick
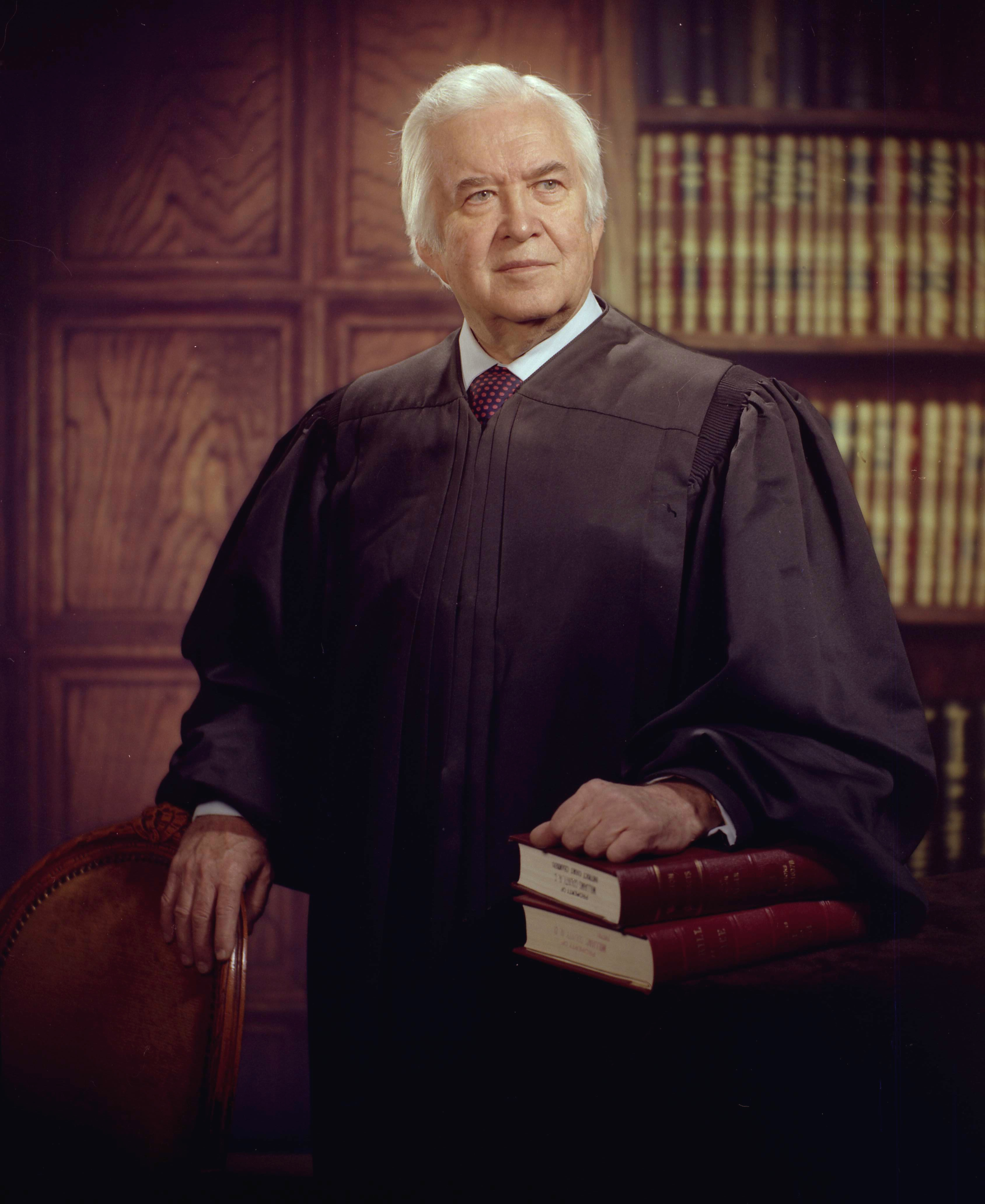

North Dakota Fifth Judicial District Judge
- In office 1953–1978

Surrogate judge of the North Dakota Supreme Court
- In office 1978–2000

Personal details
- Born: October 15, 1912 Williston, North Dakota
- Died: November 3, 2000 (aged 88) Sarasota, Florida
- Spouse: Emma May Picard (m. 1939)
- Children: 3
- Relatives: Usher L. Burdick (father); Quentin N. Burdick (brother)
- Education: University of Minnesota, University of Minnesota Law School
- Profession: Attorney, judge

Eugene Allan Burdick (October 15, 1912 – November 3, 2000) was a judge in North Dakota's Fifth Judicial District and a surrogate judge of the North Dakota Supreme Court. He was on the bench from 1953 until he retired in 1978.

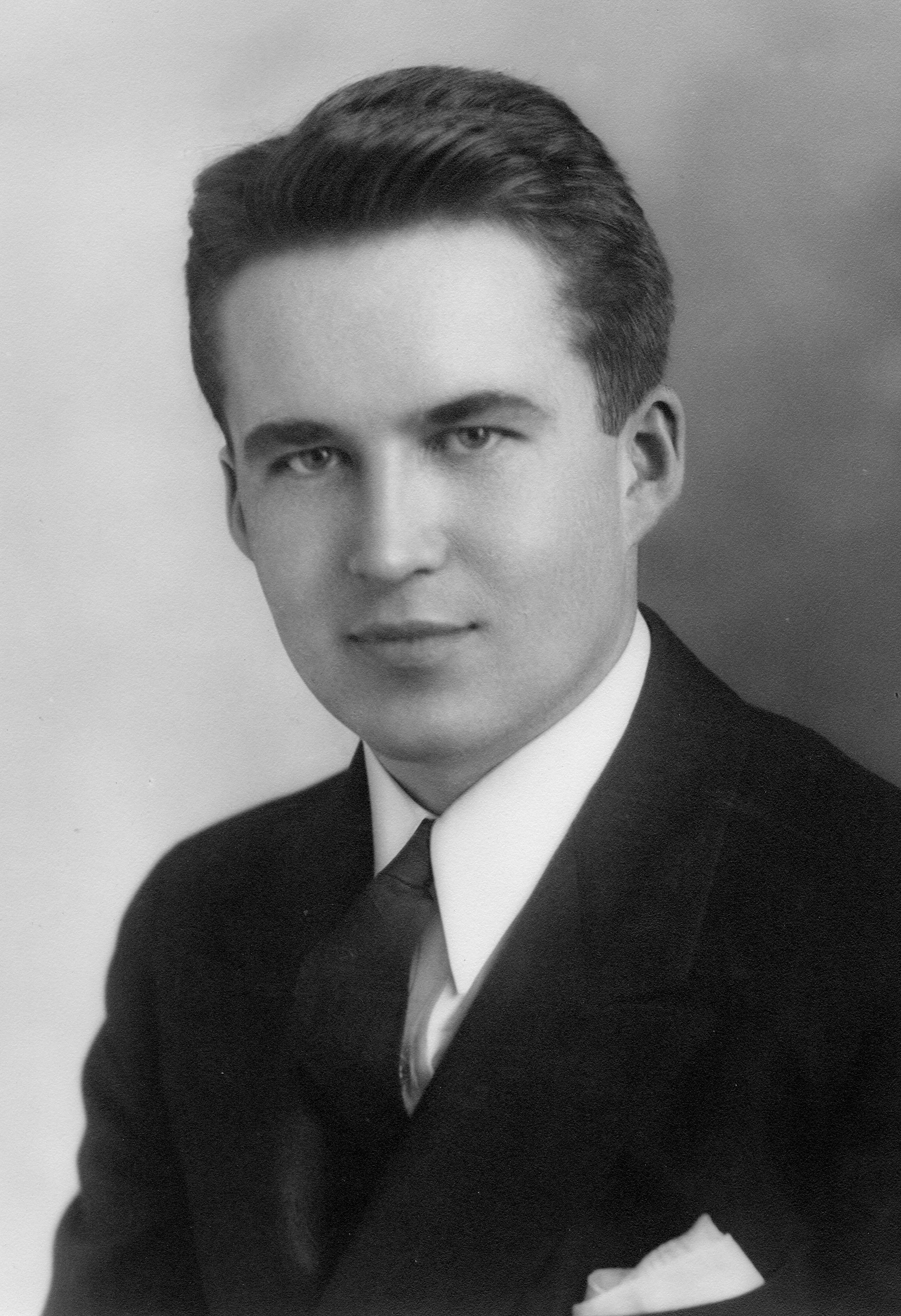
Gene at age 30

== Life ==
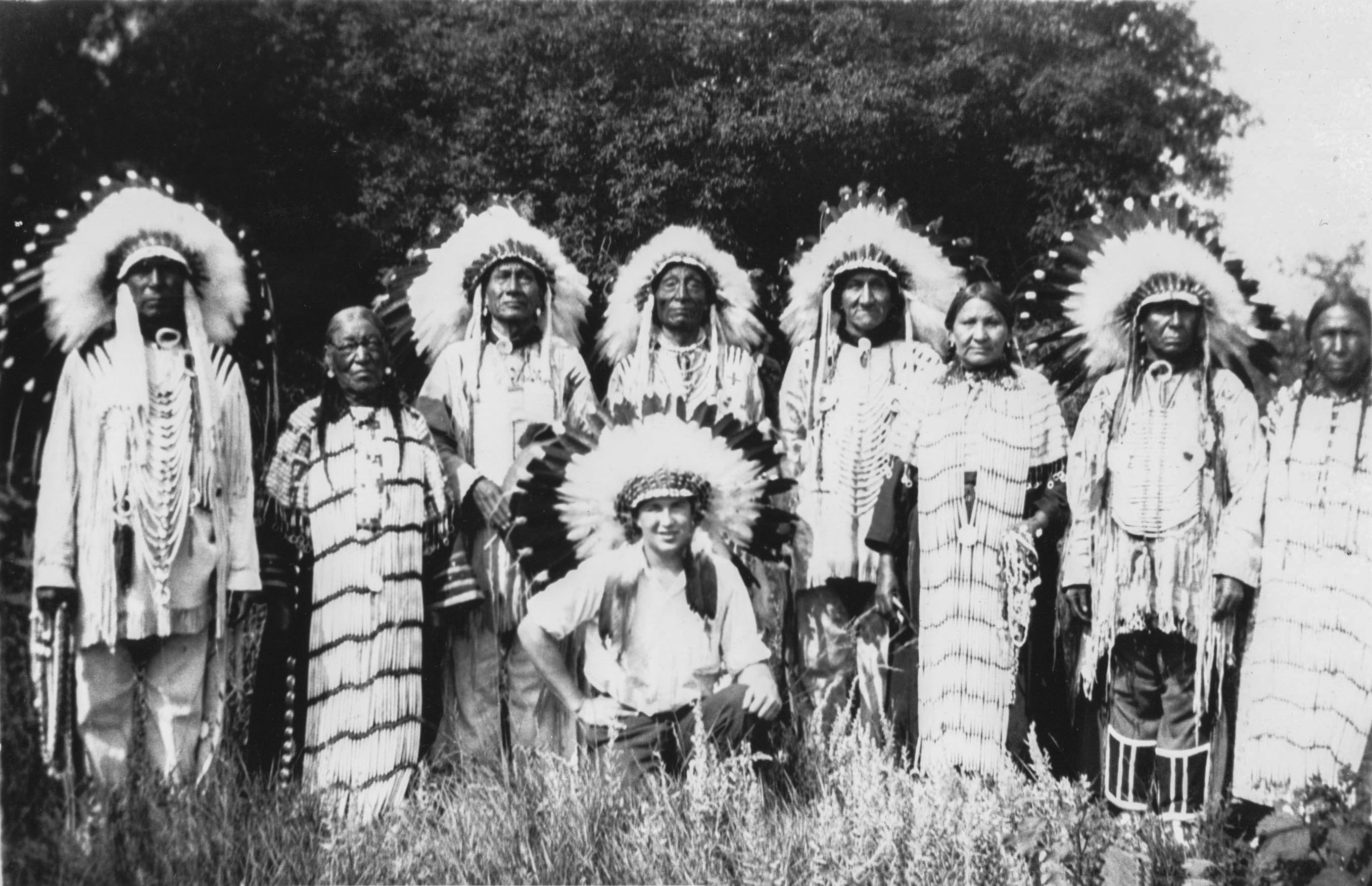
Gene with Indians

Burdick was born to Usher L. Burdick and Emma C. Robertson Burdick. He graduated from the University of Minnesota and the University of Minnesota School of Law.

Eugene Allan Burdick was born in a log cabin just east of Williston, North Dakota to North Dakota lawyer, rancher, author and politician Usher L. Burdick and Emma C. Robertson Burdick. Burdick's birthplace served as the Little Muddy Post Office in Dakota Territory in the 1880s. Burdick had an older brother, Quentin Northrup Burdick, who served 32 years in the U.S. Senate, and a younger sister, Eileen Burdick Levering. The three followed in their father's footsteps, each graduating from law school.

Burdick grew up in Williston, graduating from Williston High School in 1929 at the age of 16, and entering the University of Minnesota Law School that fall. The summers of 1930 and 1931, he travelled with his father trading buckskins and beads with Sioux Indians in exchange for articles of finished beadwork. The extensive Burdick Collection and photos he took are now housed at the North Dakota Heritage Center and State Museum.

== Career ==
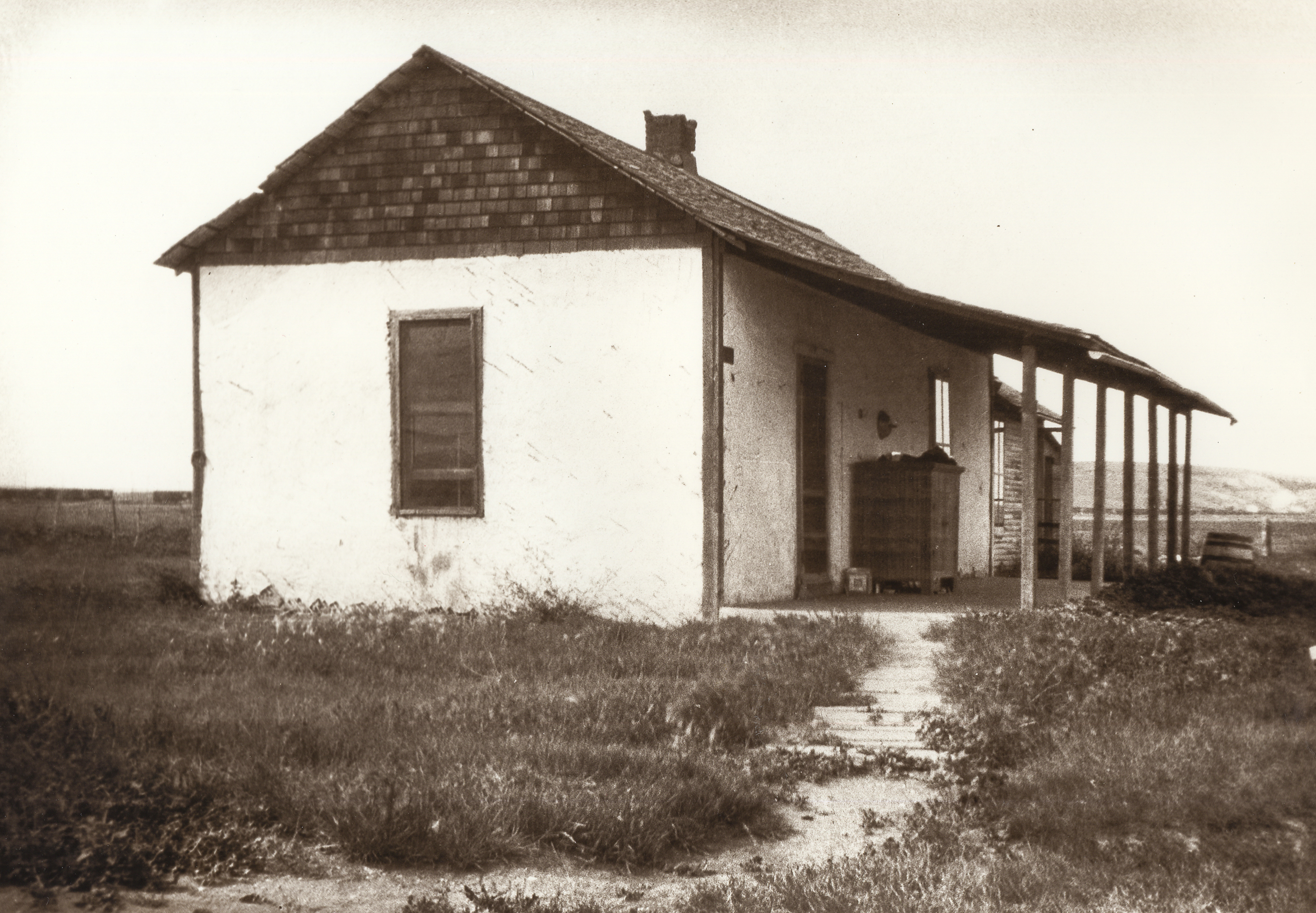

Burdick was admitted to the Bar of North Dakota in 1935, and practiced law at Williston from 1935–1953, the last six of those years serving as Williams County State's Attorney. On June 1, 1953, he was appointed Fifth Judicial District Judge by Gov. C. Norman Brunsdale for the unexpired term of Judge McGee. Burdick was elected to the bench in 1954, and reelected in 1960, 1966 and 1972. After retiring in 1978, he continued serving as a Surrogate Judge of the North Dakota Supreme Court until his death. Burdick served 41 years as commissioner on the National Conference of Commissioners on Uniform State Laws, and as its president from 1971–73. He was chairman of the NCCUSL Style Committee for 24 years. He was a member of the American Bar Association, American Judicature Society, American Law Institute, Institute of Judicial Administration, National Conference of State Trial Judges, National Council of Juvenile Court Judges, State Bar Association of North Dakota (President 1951-52), Order of the Coif, Phi Alpha Delta and Sigma Nu fraternity

== Personal life, family ==
On February 14, 1939, Valentine's Day, Burdick married Emma May Picard. Three children were born to the marriage, a daughter, Cynthia, who died in infancy; a son, William Eugene Burdick; and a daughter, Elizabeth Burdick Cantarine. The Burdick marriage lasted 61 years until his death on November 3, 2000, in Sarasota, Florida, where they lived in retirement. Mrs. Burdick died in 2003.
