= 1904 North Dakota gubernatorial election =

- November 8, 1904
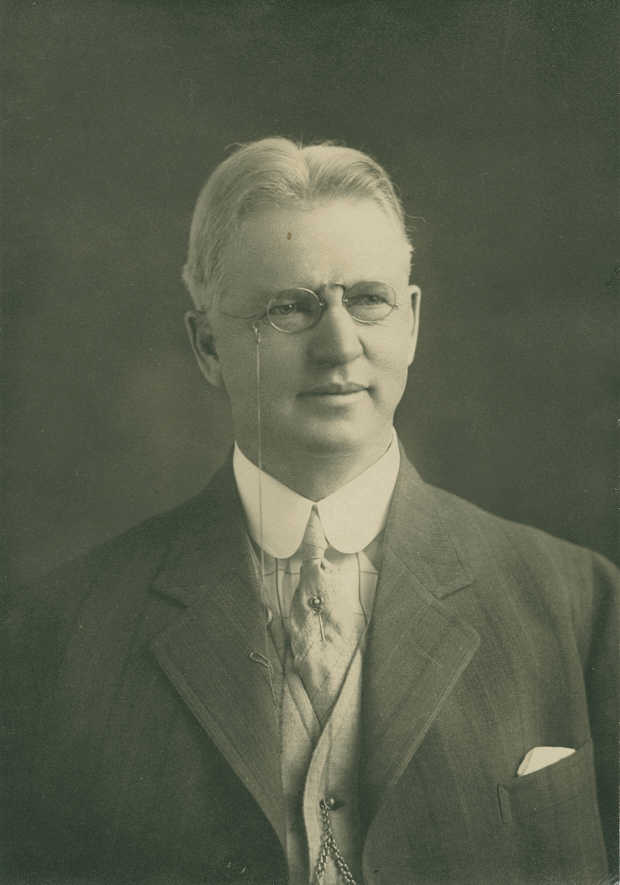

Nominee	Elmore Y. Sarles	Marthinus F. Hegge
Party	Republican	Democratic
Popular vote	48,026	16,744
Percentage	70.71%	24.65%
- County results Sarles: 50–60% 60–70% 70–80% 80–90% 90–100%
Governor before election
Frank White
Republican
Elected Governor
Elmore Y. Sarles
Republican

The 1904 North Dakota gubernatorial election was held on November 8, 1904. Republican nominee Elmore Y. Sarles defeated Democratic nominee Marthinus F. Hegge with 70.71% of the vote.

== General election ==
=== Candidates ===
Major party candidates

- Elmore Y. Sarles, Republican
- Marthinus F. Hegge, Democratic

Other candidates

- Arthur Basset, Socialist
- Hans H. Aaker, Prohibition

=== Results ===
1904 North Dakota gubernatorial election
Party	Candidate	Votes	%	±%
Republican	Elmore Y. Sarles	48,026	70.71	▲8.03
Democratic	Marthinus F. Hegge	16,744	24.65	▼10.20
Socialist	Arthur Basset	1,760	2.59	N/A
Prohibition	Hans H. Aaker	1,388	2.04	N/A
Majority		31,282	46.06	▲18.23
Total votes		67,918	100.00	
Republican hold				
