= 1902 North Dakota gubernatorial election =

- November 4, 1902
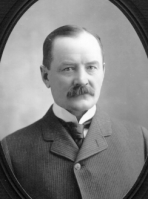

Nominee	Frank White	J. Cronan
Party	Republican	Democratic
Popular vote	31,613	17,576
Percentage	62.68%	34.85%
- County results White: 40–50% 50–60% 60–70% 70–80% 80–90% 90–100% Cronari: 40–50% No Data/Vote
Governor before election
Frank White
Republican
Elected Governor
Frank White
Republican

The 1902 North Dakota gubernatorial election was held on November 4, 1902. Incumbent Republican Frank White defeated Democratic nominee J. Cronan with 62.68% of the vote.

== General election ==
=== Candidates ===
- Frank White, Republican
- J. Cronan, Democratic

=== Results ===
1902 North Dakota gubernatorial election
Party	Candidate	Votes	%	±%
Republican	Frank White (inc.)	31,613	62.68	▲3.48
Democratic	J. Cronan	17,576	34.85	▲3.87
Independent	Robert Grant	1,245	2.47	N/A
Majority		14,037	27.83	▲7.35
Total votes		50,434	100.00	
Republican hold				
