= Harold Theodore Tate =

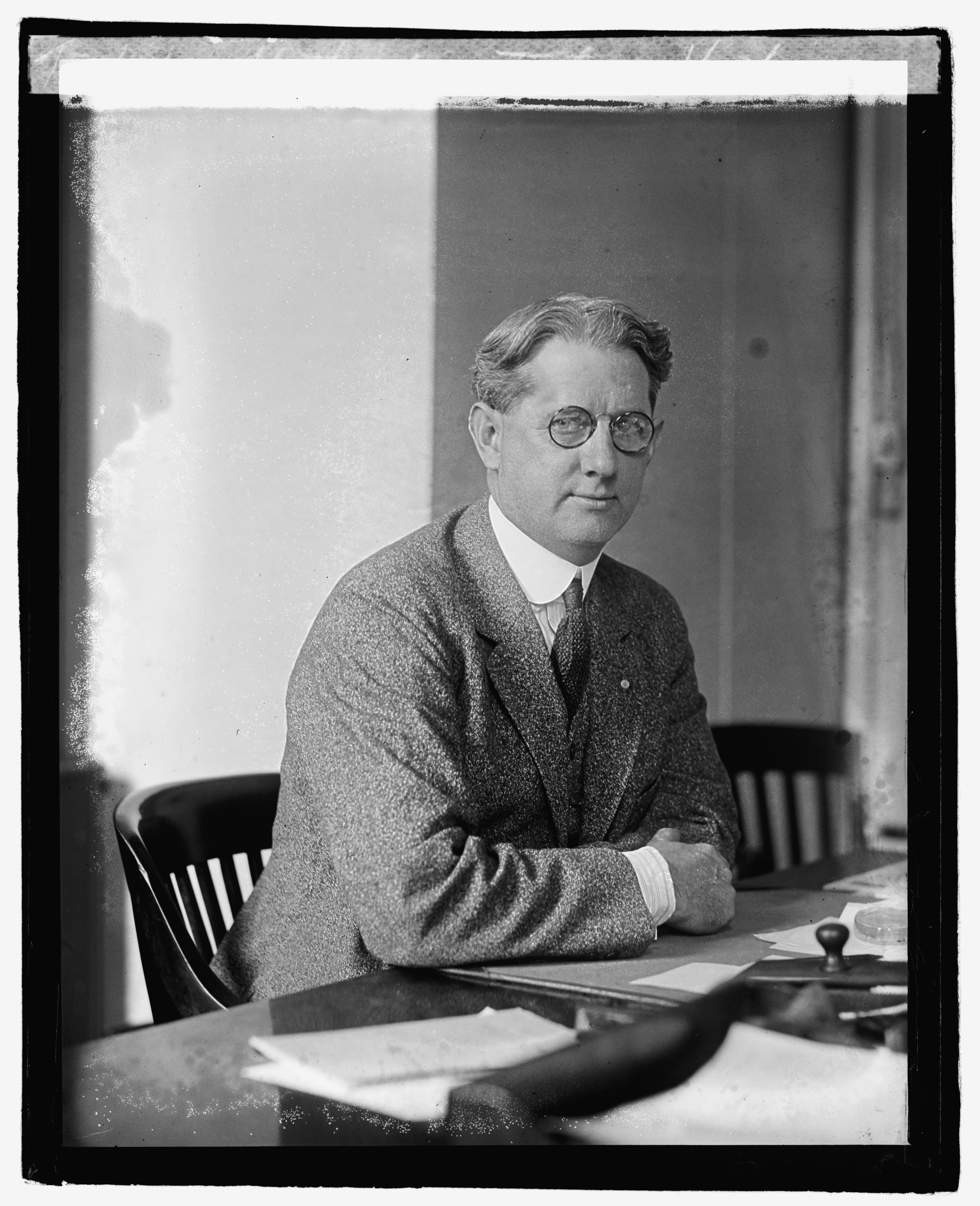

26th Treasurer of the United States
- In office May 31, 1928 – January 17, 1929
- President: Calvin Coolidge
- Preceded by: Frank White
- Succeeded by: W. O. Woods

Personal details
- Born: December 28, 1875 Rutledge, Tennessee
- Died: October 23, 1960 (aged 84)
- Resting place: Emma Jarnagin Cemetery, Morristown, Tennessee
- Parent(s): Allen S. Tate; Ariana Peck Tate
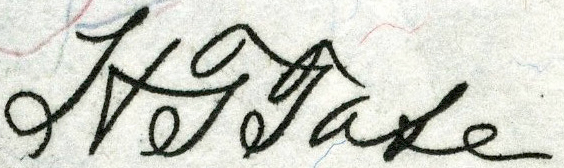
- Signature

Harold Theodore Tate (December 28, 1875 - October 23, 1960) was the 26th Treasurer of the United States from May 31, 1928, until January 17, 1929, serving under President Calvin Coolidge. While holding that post, his duties included being the signatory on United States currency.

He was born on December 28, 1875, the son of Allen S. Tate and Ariana Peck Tate of Grainger County, Tennessee. His father Allen was the assistant Attorney General in the Department of the Interior under President William McKinley. H.T. Tate had previously served as Deputy Treasurer of the United States, and one of his duties in that post included signing the President's paycheck. His signature was the first to be included on the modern sized United States paper money as Treasurer of the United States.

Managing money seems to have run in this family. H. T. Tate's brother Ernest served as Treasurer of the Southern Railway, headquartered at 15th and K Street N.W. in Washington, D.C., just a few blocks away from the United States Department of the Treasury.

H.T. Tate died on October 23, 1960, and is buried in Emma Jarnagin Cemetery in Morristown, Tennessee.

Preceded by Frank White	Treasurer of the United States; 1928–1929	Succeeded by W. O. Woods

== Sources ==
- Leaves from the Family Tree, by Penelope Johnson Allen, reprinted in The Chattanooga Sunday Times, December 6, 1936 (This article erroneously names Oscar Tate as Treasurer of the United States. Oscar was the brother of H. T. Tate.).
- Excerpts from History of Tennessee, The Goodspeed Publishing Co., Nashville, TN 1887.
