= Usher L. Burdick =

American politician (1879–1960)

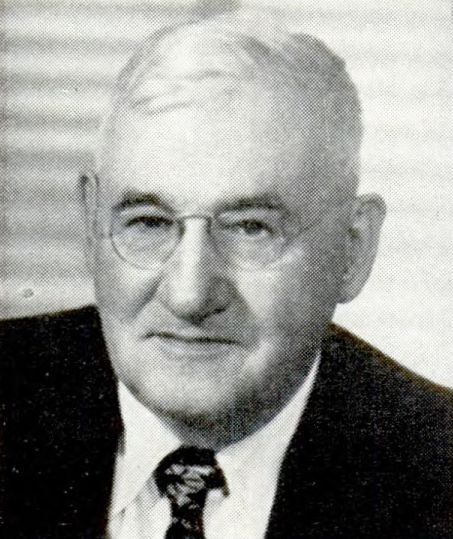
- Burdick c. 1953

Member of the U.S. House of Representatives from North Dakota's at-large district
- In office January 3, 1949 – January 3, 1959
- Preceded by: Charles R. Robertson
- Succeeded by: Quentin Burdick
- In office January 3, 1935 – January 3, 1945
- Preceded by: James H. Sinclair
- Succeeded by: Charles R. Robertson

8th Lieutenant Governor of North Dakota
- In office 1911–1913
- Governor: John Burke
- Preceded by: Robert S. Lewis
- Succeeded by: Anton Kraabel

Member of the North Dakota House of Representatives from the 18th district
- In office 1907–1911

Personal details
- Born: Usher Lloyd Burdick; February 21, 1879 Owatonna, Minnesota, U.S.
- Died: August 19, 1960 (aged 81) Washington, D.C., U.S.
- Party: Republican
- Spouses: Emma Robertson (m. 1901, divorced); Edna Leavitt Sierson (m. 1955; died 1955); Jean Rodgers (m. 1958)
- Relations: Jocelyn Burdick (daughter-in-law); Robert W. Levering (son-in-law)
- Children: Quentin; Eugene; Eileen
- Education: University of Minnesota Law School

Usher Lloyd Burdick (February 21, 1879 – August 19, 1960) was a member of the United States House of Representatives from North Dakota. He was the father of Quentin Burdick.

== Early life and career ==
Burdick was born in Owatonna, Minnesota, the son of Lucy (Farnum) and Ozias Perry Warren Burdick. His parents were farmers. Burdick moved with his parents to Dakota Territory in 1882. He graduated from the North Dakota State Normal School at Mayville in 1900.

He was deputy superintendent of schools of Benson County from 1900 to 1902. He graduated from University of Minnesota Law School in 1904, playing football as well as teaching school in a business college while attending the university. He was admitted to the state bar in 1904 and commenced practice in Munich, North Dakota.

== Politics ==
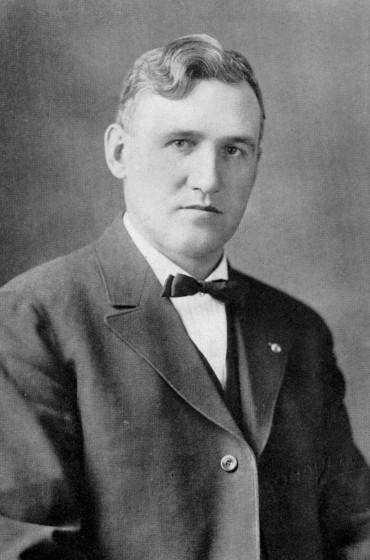
Burdick c. 1917

He served as a member of the North Dakota House of Representatives from 1907 to 1911, serving as speaker in 1909. He moved to Williston in 1907 and continued the practice of law. He was the eighth lieutenant governor of North Dakota from 1911 to 1913, state's attorney of Williams County from 1913 to 1915, and served as assistant United States district attorney for North Dakota from 1929 to 1932. Burdick also engaged in livestock breeding and farming and was an author.

In 1911, as lieutenant governor, Burdick presided over the impeachment trial of Judge John F. Cowan, which was the first impeachment trial in state history. Cowan was found not guilty.

In 1932, Burdick was elected president of the Farmers' Holiday Association, an association which advocated strikes for farmers, and which took radical direct action against farm foreclosures. Burdick was an unsuccessful candidate for the Republican nomination to the 73rd Congress in 1932, in which he favored Franklin D. Roosevelt to be elected president and the repeal of Prohibition.

Burdick was elected as a Republican to the 74th Congress and to the four succeeding Congresses (January 3, 1935 – January 3, 1945). While in Congress he supported many New Deal programs. He also was supportive of Native American issues. He was not a candidate for renomination in 1944, but was an unsuccessful candidate for the Republican nomination for United States Senator for North Dakota. He was an unsuccessful Independent candidate for election in 1944 to the 79th Congress. Burdick was elected to the 81st Congress and to the four succeeding Congresses (January 3, 1949 – January 3, 1959). He was the only Republican congressional representative to vote against the Communist Control Act which banned the Communist party. In 1958, afraid that he might be defeated for re-election in the Republican primary, Burdick offered to withdraw his candidacy if the Democratic-NPL Party agreed to support his son Quentin as the party candidate. Quentin then received the party endorsement in April, and won the election in November. Burdick voted in favor of the Civil Rights Act of 1957.

== Personal life ==
On Feb. 28, 1958, nearly three years after the death of his first wife, Emma, Burdick—then 79—married his 30-year-old secretary, Jean Rodgers.

== Death ==
On August 19, 1960, only eleven days after his son Quentin was sworn into the United States Senate, Burdick died at age 81 in Washington, D.C., and was interred on his ranch at Williston, North Dakota.

Political offices
Preceded by Robert S. Lewis	Lieutenant Governor of North Dakota; 1911–1913	Succeeded by Anton T. Kraabel
U.S. House of Representatives
Preceded by James H. Sinclair	Member of the U.S. House of Representatives from North Dakota's at-large congressional district 1935–1945	Succeeded by Charles R. Robertson
Preceded by Charles R. Robertson	Member of the U.S. House of Representatives from North Dakota's at-large congressional district 1949–1959	Succeeded by Quentin N. Burdick
