= David Bartlett (North Dakota politician) =

American politician

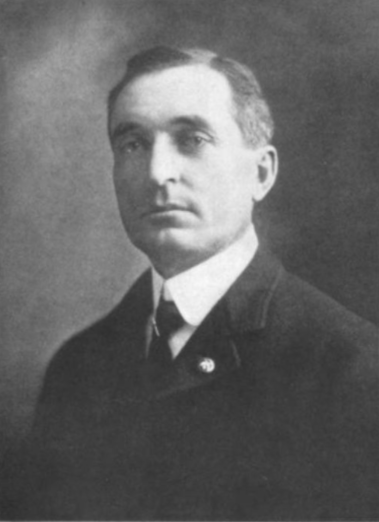

6th Lieutenant Governor of North Dakota
- In office 1901–1907
- Governor: Frank White; Elmore Y. Sarles
- Preceded by: Joseph M. Devine
- Succeeded by: Robert S. Lewis

Personal details
- Born: October 23, 1855 Lemorna, Maine, U.S.
- Died: October 16, 1913 (aged 57) Boston, Massachusetts, U.S.
- Party: Republican
- Other political affiliations: Progressive
- Spouse: Ella Trundy (m. 1894)
- Education: University of Michigan Law School
- Occupation: Lawyer, businessman

David Bartlett (October 23, 1855 – October 16, 1913) was an American lawyer and politician in the state of North Dakota. He served as the sixth lieutenant governor of North Dakota from 1901 to 1907 under Governors Frank White and Elmore Y. Sarles.

Bartlett was born in Lemorna, Maine, in 1855. He graduated from the University of Michigan in 1876, attaining a law degree. Bartlett resided briefly in Colorado before moving to Cooperstown, North Dakota, in 1883, becoming a pioneering businessman and citizen of Griggs County, North Dakota. He served on the North Dakota Constitutional Convention of 1889. Bartlett also served as states attorney of Griggs County, and was a proponent of prohibition. He served as the Republican lieutenant governor of North Dakota from 1901 to 1907, but later joined the Progressive Movement in 1912. He died on October 16, 1913, in Boston from a cerebral hemorrhage.
