= Joseph M. Devine =

American politician

Joseph McMurray Devine
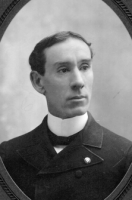

6th Governor of North Dakota
- In office August 9, 1898 – January 3, 1899
- Lieutenant: Vacant
- Preceded by: Frank A. Briggs
- Succeeded by: Frederick B. Fancher

5th Lieutenant Governor of North Dakota
- In office January 6, 1897 – August 9, 1898
- Governor: Frank A. Briggs
- Preceded by: John H. Worst
- Succeeded by: David Bartlett

Personal details
- Born: March 15, 1861 Wheeling, Virginia (now Wheeling, West Virginia)
- Died: August 31, 1938 (aged 77) Mandan, North Dakota
- Party: Republican

Joseph McMurray Devine (March 15, 1861 – August 31, 1938) was an American politician who was the sixth governor of North Dakota from 1898 to 1899. He served as governor for less than one year as he finished the term after Governor Frank A. Briggs died in office.

== Biography ==
Joseph M. Devine was born in Wheeling (in modern-day West Virginia; located in Virginia at the time of his birth). He was educated in the public schools. He received a B.A. degree from the West Virginia University in 1881. He married Ida Frances Holloway in 1891 and they had one daughter. He was again married, in 1900, to Mary Bernadine Hascom; and had a son, Douglas, and two daughters, Helen and Bernadine. He moved to LaMoure County, Dakota Territory in 1884 and was superintendent of schools for ten years. In 1892 he lost an election for state superintendent of public education to Laura J. Eisenhuth, the first woman elected to state office in the United States.

== Career ==
He first entered politics as Lieutenant Governor of North Dakota in 1897. When Governor Frank A. Briggs died on August 9, 1898, Devine, assumed the duties of governorship for the remainder of the term. He won reelection as Lieutenant Governor from 1899 through 1901 He continued to be active in educational issues, serving as the North Dakota Superintendent of Public Instruction from 1901 to 1902. In 1914, he became executive head of the State Training School in Mandan. The last position he held was as State Immigration Commissioner from 1923 to 1933.

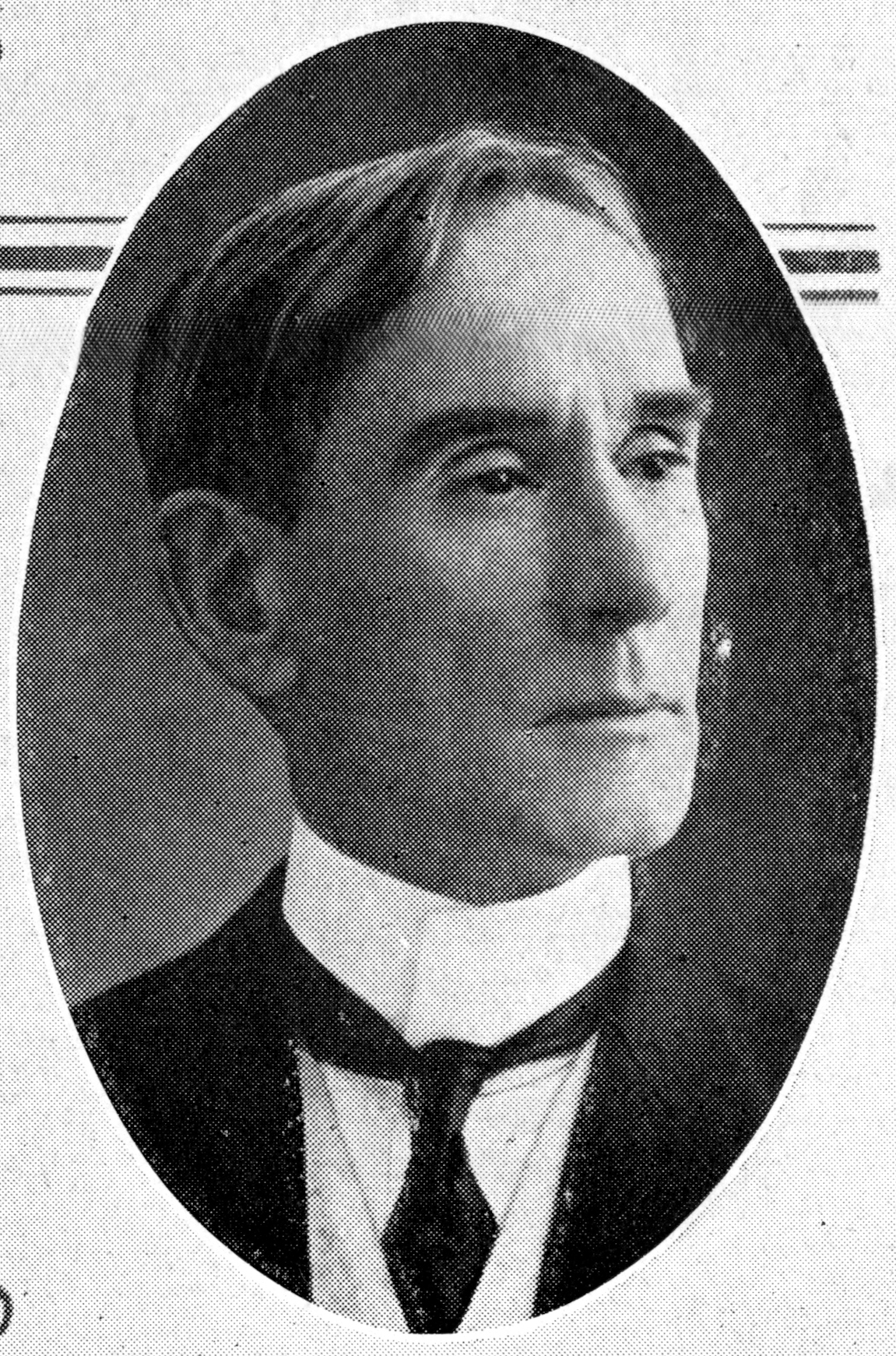
Joseph M. Devine, North Dakota Superintendent of Public Instruction, 1901-1902

== Death ==
Devine died of heart failure on August 31, 1938, and is interred in Mandan Union Cemetery in Mandan, North Dakota.

Political offices
Preceded by John H. Worst	Lieutenant Governor of North Dakota; 1897–1898	Succeeded by David Bartlett
Preceded by Frank A. Briggs	Governor of North Dakota; 1898–1899	Succeeded by Frederick B. Fancher
Preceded by John G. Halland	North Dakota Superintendent of Public Instruction; 1901–1902	Succeeded by Walter L. Stockwell
