= Eva M. Reed =

American lecturer, librarian, botanist and botanical collector (1856–1901)

Eva M. Reed (1856 – 7 July 1901) was an American botanist.

Reed was educated at the University of Wisconsin, she worked as indexer at the Missouri Botanical Gardens for eight years, from 1894 until her death. In 1901, she had begun to work on plant ecology, in association with the botanical department of the University of Chicago. During her summer holiday she was killed by a train, while walking the tracks near Louisiana, investigating plants in the field.

The Field Museum in Illinois currently holds a specimen, the Calypso bulbosa (L.) Oakes from the Orchidaceae family, collected by Reed in November 1886.
