= Steven Nock =

American sociologist

Steven L. Nock (March 11, 1950 – January 20, 2008) was a researcher, author, and the Commonwealth Professor of Sociology at the University of Virginia. He was a recognized expert on the role of marriage in society, and worked in the Federal Department of Health and Human Services as a consultant on American family policy.

== Biography ==
Nock was born in 1950, the youngest of four children to Frank Nock and Edna Hinson Nock. Steven graduated from the University of Richmond in 1972 and received his Ph.D. in Sociology from the University of Massachusetts Amherst in 1976. He taught at Tulane University and was a member of the National Academy of Sciences prior to coming to the University of Virginia Department of Sociology in 1978, where he taught until his death from complications related to Diabetes mellitus.

== Career ==
Nock wrote extensively on the role of marriage in society. He authored text-books and articles about the causes and consequences of change in the American family. He investigated issues of privacy, unmarried fatherhood, cohabitation, commitment, divorce, and marriage. His book, "Marriage in Men's Lives" won the William J. Good Book Award from the American Sociological Association for the most outstanding contribution to family scholarship in 1999. He concluded that "all of the articles reviewed contained at least one fatal flaw of design or execution; and not a single one of the studies was conducted according to general accepted standards of scientific research", but his assertions were criticised by Judith Stacey and Timothy Biblarz.

== Selected works ==
- Introduction to Sociology (1983) ISBN 978-0-15-545910-6
- Sociology of the Family (1986) ISBN 978-0-13-821000-7
- The Sociology of Public Issues (1989) ISBN 978-0-534-12096-2
- Introduction to Sociology (1991) ISBN 978-0-15-545919-9
- Marriage in Men's Lives (1998) ISBN 978-0-19-512056-1
- Covenant Marriage : The Movement to Reclaim Tradition in America (2008) ISBN 978-0-8135-4326-0
