= Robert S. Lewis =

American politician

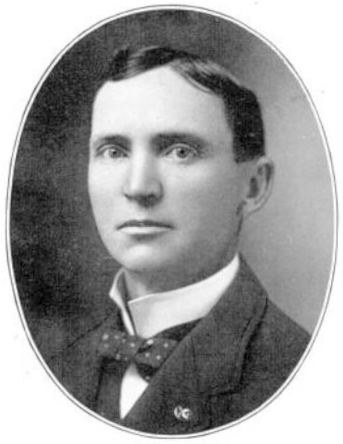

7th Lieutenant Governor of North Dakota
- In office 1907–1911
- Governor: John Burke
- Preceded by: David Bartlett
- Succeeded by: Usher L. Burdick

Member of the North Dakota Senate
- In office 1901–1905

Personal details
- Born: August 15, 1856 Iuka, Mississippi, U.S.
- Died: May 23, 1956 (aged 99) Fargo, North Dakota, U.S.
- Party: North Dakota Republican Party
- Spouse: Alice Carpenter (m. 1879)
- Children: 3
- Occupation: Banker
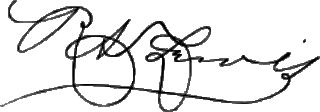
- Signature

Robert Steele Lewis (August 15, 1856 – May 23, 1956) was a North Dakota Republican Party politician who served as the seventh lieutenant governor of North Dakota under Governor John Burke. Lewis also served in the North Dakota Senate from 1901 to 1905.

== Biography ==
Robert S. Lewis was born in Iuka, Mississippi, on August 15, 1856.

He married Alice Carpenter in 1879, and they had three children.

Lewis died in Fargo, North Dakota, on May 23, 1956, at the age of 99, only few months shy of his 100th birthday, making him the oldest statewide officer in the state's history.
