= Frank White (North Dakota politician) =

American politician (1856–1940)

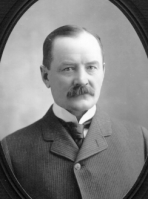

25th Treasurer of the United States
- In office May 2, 1921 – May 1, 1928
- President: Warren G. Harding; Calvin Coolidge
- Preceded by: John Burke
- Succeeded by: Harold Theodore Tate

8th Governor of North Dakota
- In office January 10, 1901 – January 4, 1905
- Lieutenant: David Bartlett
- Preceded by: Frederick B. Fancher
- Succeeded by: Elmore Y. Sarles

Member of the North Dakota Senate
- In office 1892–1898

Member of the North Dakota House of Representatives
- In office 1890–1892

Personal details
- Born: December 12, 1856 Stillman Valley, Illinois, U.S.
- Died: March 23, 1940 (aged 83) Washington, D. C., U.S.
- Party: Republican
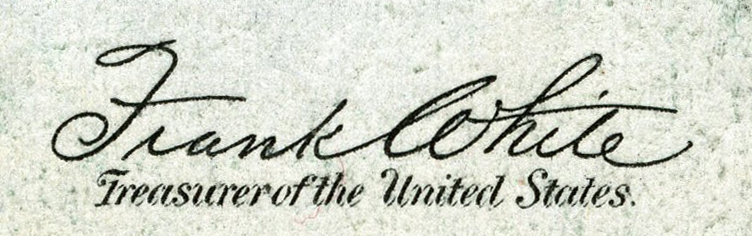
- Signature

Frank White (December 12, 1856 – March 23, 1940) was an American politician who served as the eighth governor of North Dakota from 1901 to 1905. He was a Republican who also served as Treasurer of the United States from 1921 to 1928.

== Family ==
Colonel Frank White was born on December 12, 1856, in Stillman Valley, Illinois, to Joshua and Lucy Ann (Brown) White. His father, Joshua, served in the first Wisconsin Constitutional Convention of 1846 and in the Illinois House of Representatives.

== Education and career ==
White received a Bachelor of Arts degree in Civil Engineering from the University of Illinois in 1880. Soon after graduation, White worked for the Chicago, Milwaukee & St. Paul Railroad. In 1882, he moved to the Dakota Territory, although his reasons for doing so are unclear. According to the book Barnes County History, White departed for North Dakota at his father's request to look after land that he had acquired near Valley City; Clement Lounsberry's North Dakota History and People reports that White moved to North Dakota to look after land that he himself had purchased. Nonetheless, while at Valley City, White met Elsie Hadley, an Indiana native and maths instructor at Valley City State Normal School. The couple were married on September 19, 1894, in Indianapolis. The couple had one son, Edwin Lee White who was born in Valley City, North Dakota, on July 5, 1896. He was awarded the degree of L.L.D. in 1904 by the University of Illinois

== Political career ==
White's interests soon turned toward politics, and in 1890 he was elected to represent District 15 in the North Dakota House of Representatives. He served only one term before being elected to the North Dakota State Senate in 1892. He was re-elected in 1896, but resigned from this post to become a commissioned major of the First North Dakota Volunteer Infantry, Spanish–American War.

White arrived in the Philippines on July 30, 1898, participating in the capture of Manila on August 13. Throughout his service in the war, White participated in over twenty engagements, was a highly respected leader, and was awarded the Silver Star for bravery during combat.

White returned to the United States in 1899, and purchased land near Litchville, North Dakota. In 1900, he opened a real estate and insurance office. That same year, he received the Republican nomination for Governor, and was victorious in the fall election. He was reelected in 1902, and under White's two-term governorship, many needed reforms were implemented. A large amount of the school funds were not drawing interest, and White decided to invest the money in bonds and farm loans, earning interest in the lump sum. It was during his administration that North Dakota's first state bonds were redeemed. In fact, through his sound financial maneuvering, a $223,000 state deficit was eliminated.

In January 1905, however, White decided to retire from political office to return to private business. He organized the Middlewest Fire Insurance Company and served as its president until 1913, when the company merged with Twin City Fire Insurance Company. In 1914, White organized the Middlewest Loan & Trust Company and was its president until America's entry into World War I.

== World War I ==
With the advent of World War I, White was commissioned once more, this time at the rank of colonel. He commanded the Second North Dakota National Guard Regiment, which later merged into the 41st Infantry Division. In 1918, he was sent to France, but due to his age he was not assigned to combat duty. He was awarded the Order of Academic Palms by the French Government.

== Treasurer of the United States ==
When the war ended, White returned to take up his position in Middlewest Loan & Trust Company. His career in politics was not finished, though, for in 1921 White was named United States Treasurer at the request of President Warren G. Harding. When Calvin Coolidge became president in 1924, he was asked to remain in the position. Having served in the position of US Treasurer from 1921, he resigned in May 1928 to become president of Southern Mortgage Guaranty Corporation at Chattanooga, Tennessee. He also implemented smaller dollar bills while in office.

== Death ==
Elsie White died in 1925. Colonel Frank White died in Washington, D.C., on March 23, 1940. He was buried in Arlington National Cemetery, Arlington, Virginia, with full military honors.

Party political offices
| Preceded by Frederick B. Fancher | Republican nominee for Governor of North Dakota; 1900, 1902 | Succeeded by Elmore Y. Sarles |
Political offices
| Preceded by Frederick B. Fancher | Governor of North Dakota; 1901–1905 | Succeeded by Elmore Y. Sarles |
| Preceded by John Burke | Treasurer of the United States; 1921–1928 | Succeeded by Harold Theodore Tate |
