= Anthony Prusinski =

American politician

Anthony C. Prusinski (February 10, 1901 – January 2, 1950) was an American politician.

Born in Chicago, Illinois, Prusinski went to Loyola University Chicago. He worked as the chief deputy coroner of Cook County, Illinois and was a member of the Democratic Party. From 1943 until 1950, Prucinski served in the Illinois House of Representatives. He died of a heart attack in Chicago while driving.
