= Frederick B. Fancher =

American politician (1852–1944)

Frederick Bartlett Fancher
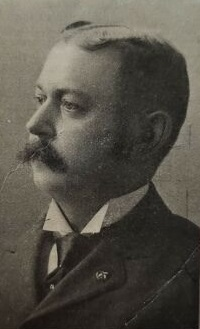
- From 1899's Appletons' Annual Cyclopædia and Register of Important Events of the Year 1898

7th Governor of North Dakota
- In office January 3, 1899 – January 10, 1901
- Lieutenant: Joseph M. Devine
- Preceded by: Joseph M. Devine
- Succeeded by: Frank White

Insurance Commissioner of North Dakota
- In office 1895–1899
- Governor: Roger Allin; Frank A. Briggs; Joseph M. Devine
- Preceded by: James Cudhie
- Succeeded by: George W. Harrison

Personal details
- Born: April 2, 1852 Orleans County, New York, U.S.
- Died: January 10, 1944 (aged 91) Los Angeles, California, U.S.
- Party: Republican

Frederick Bartlett Fancher (April 2, 1852 – January 10, 1944) was an American politician who was the seventh governor of North Dakota from 1899 to 1901.

== Biography ==
Frederick B. Fancher was born in Orleans County, New York, on April 2, 1852. Educated in the public schools, he also attended Michigan State Normal School in Ypsilanti, Michigan. He married Florence S. Van Voorhies.

== Career ==
Working in insurance in Illinois (where his office was destroyed in the Great Chicago Fire of 1871) and North Dakota, Fancher first entered politics and was President of the North Dakota Constitutional Convention in 1889. He had moved to North Dakota in 1881 and began a large farming operation near Jamestown. He was State Insurance Commissioner from 1895 to 1899 and a trustee board member of the State Hospital for the Insane.

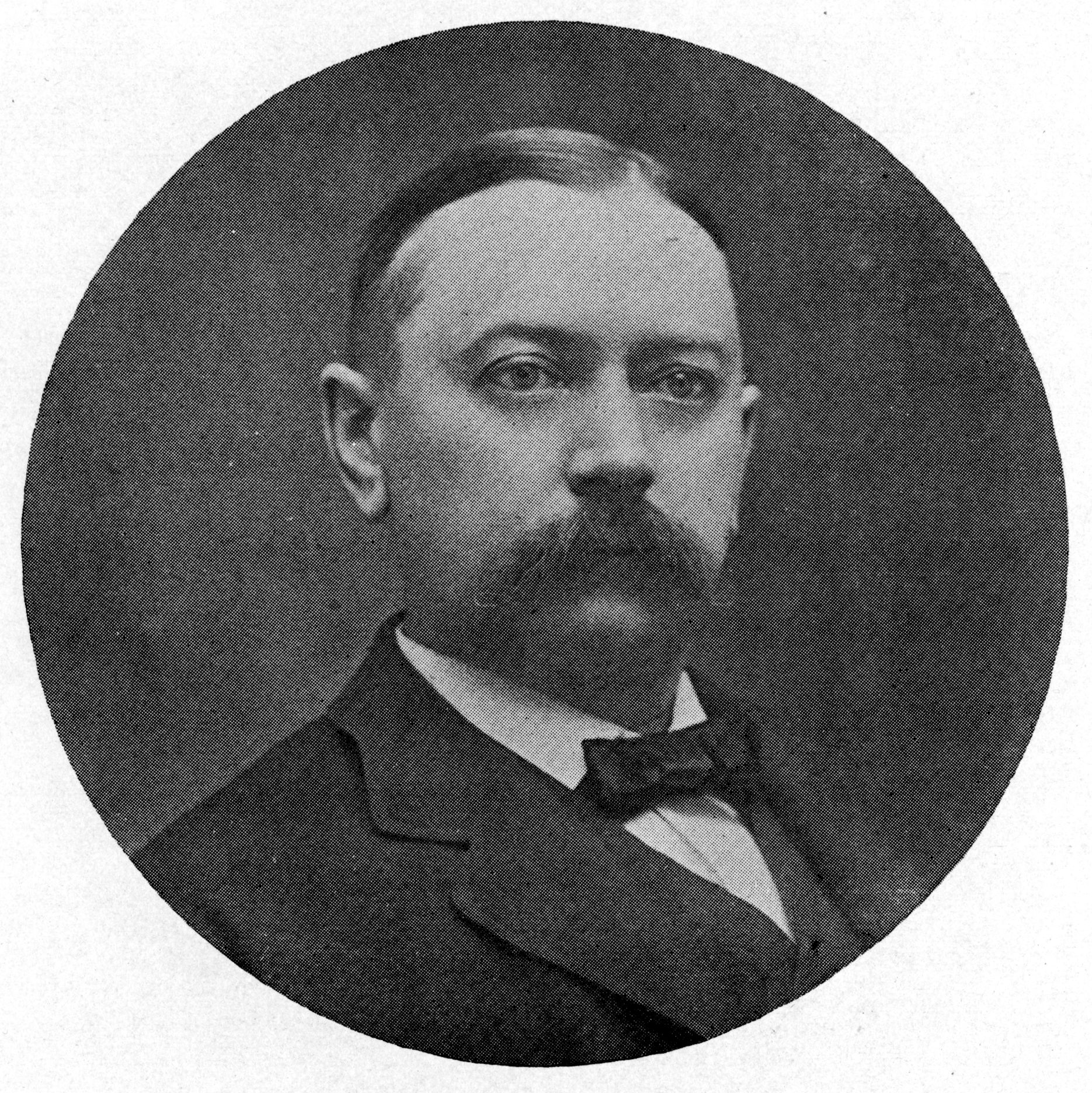
North Dakota Governor Frederick B. Fancher

Securing the Republican nomination, he was elected Governor and served from 1899 to January 10, 1901. While he was in that office, a state board of pardons, and a twine plant in the state penitentiary were established. Although renominated at the Republican convention, he withdrew due to ill health.

After leaving office, he moved to Sacramento, California and had a retail and wholesale grocery business until his retirement in 1925.

== Death ==
Fancher died in Los Angeles, California, on January 10, 1944, at age 91. He is buried in East Lawn Memorial Park in Sacramento, California. He was the last surviving Governor to have served in the 19th century.

Party political offices
Preceded by Frank A. Briggs	Republican nominee for Governor of North Dakota; 1898	Succeeded by Frank White
Political offices
Preceded by Joseph M. Devine	Governor of North Dakota; 1899–1901	Succeeded by Frank White
