= Gold certificate (United States) =

Certificate of ownership that gold owners held instead of storing the actual gold

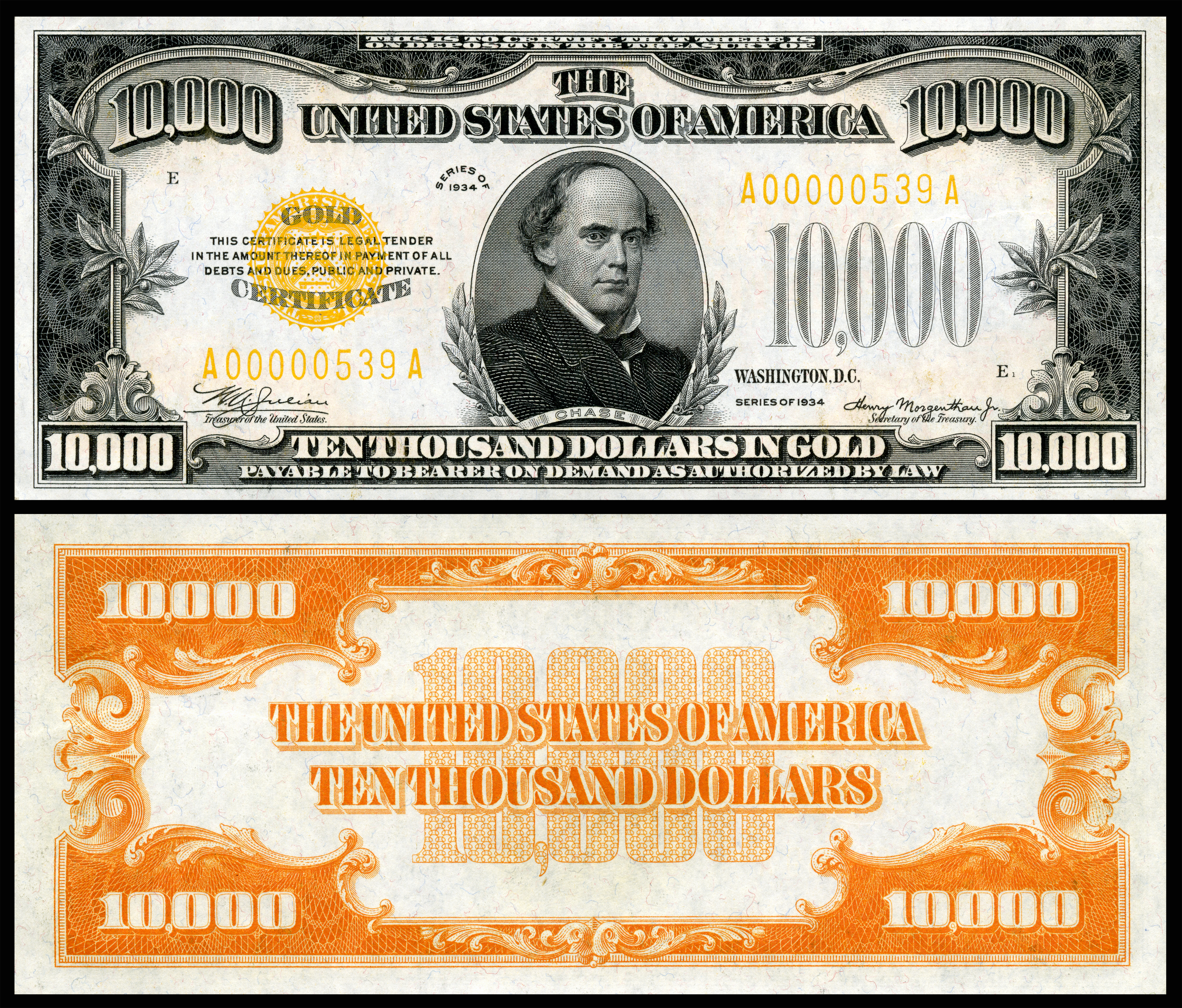
A Series 1934 $10,000 gold certificate depicting Salmon P. Chase, Smithsonian Institution

Gold certificates were issued by the United States Treasury as a form of representative money from 1865 to 1933. While the United States observed a gold standard, the certificates offered a more convenient way to pay in gold than the use of coins. General public ownership of gold certificates was outlawed in 1933 and since then they have been available only to the Federal Reserve Banks, with book-entry certificates replacing the paper form.

== Overview ==
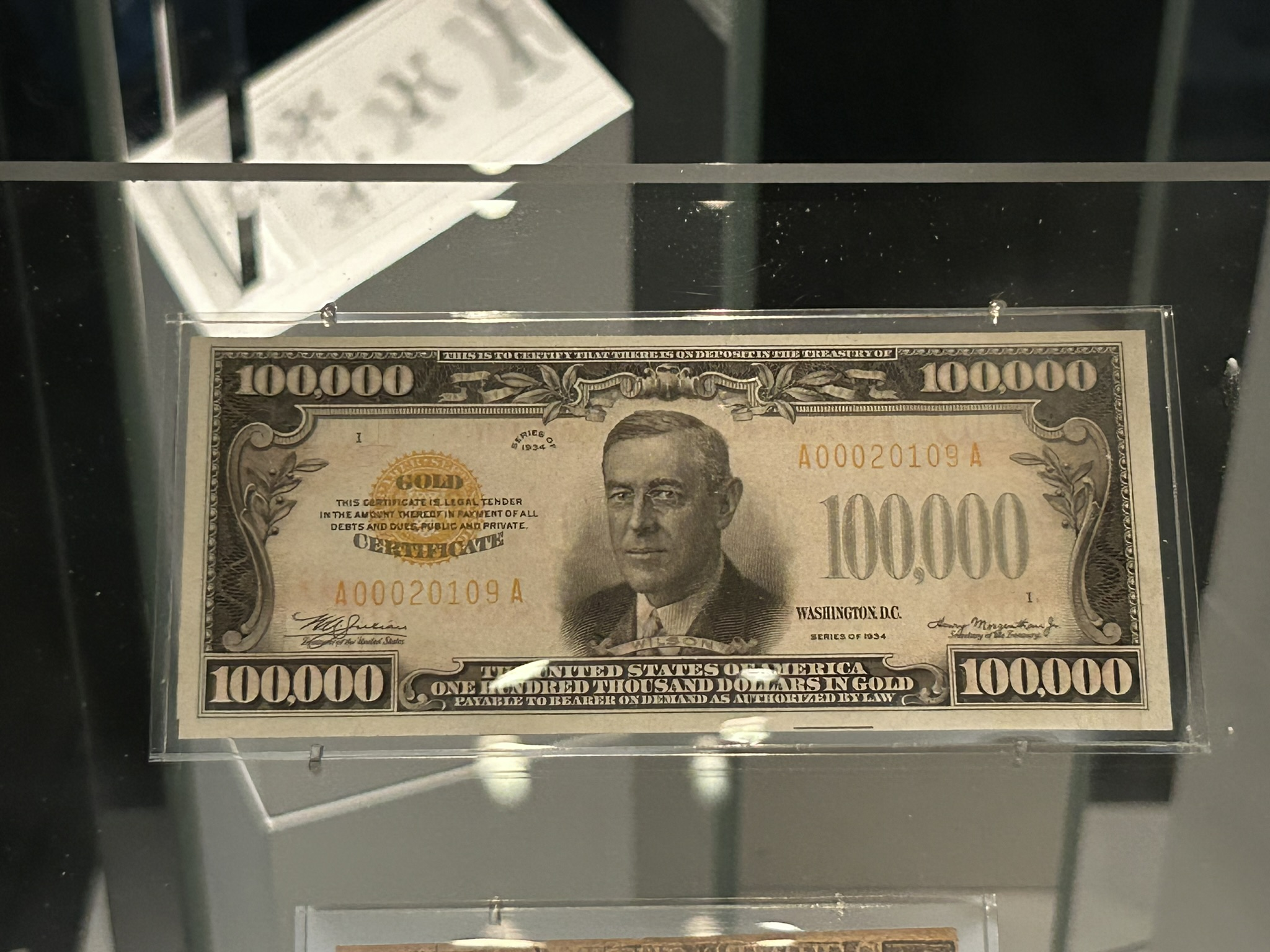
The $100,000 bill, a gold certificate from Series 1934, is the largest denomination banknote ever produced in the United States; it was printed to facilitate transactions between Federal Reserve Banks, and was never issued for usage by the public.

Gold certificates were first authorized under the Legal Tender Act of 1863, but unlike the United States Notes also authorized, they apparently were not printed until 1865. The need for them arose from the limitations of the United States Notes. To promote the flow of gold into the Treasury and maintain the credit of the government, the notes could not be used to pay customs duties or interest on the federal debt. Gold certificates, representing coins held physically in the Treasury, were instead provided for those purposes. The notes, as legal tender for most purposes, were the dominant paper currency until 1879 but were accepted at a discount in comparison to the gold certificates. After 1879 the government started to redeem United States Notes at face value in gold, bringing them into parity with gold certificates and making the latter also a candidate for general circulation.

The first gold certificates had no series date; they were hand-dated and payable either to the bearer or to the order of a named payee. They featured a vignette of an eagle uniformly across all denominations. Later issues (series 1870, 1871, and 1875) featured portraits of historical figures. The reverse sides were either blank or featured abstract designs. The only exception was the $20 of 1865, which had a picture of a $20 gold coin. The Series of 1882 was the first series that was uniformly payable to the bearer; it was transferable and anyone could redeem it for the equivalent in gold. This was the case with all gold certificate series from that point on, with the exception of 1888, 1900, and 1934. The series of 1888 and 1900 were issued to specific payees as before. The series of 1882 had the same portraits as the series of 1875, but a different back design, featuring a series of eagles, as well as complex border work.

== Historic U.S. gold certificates (1863–1933) ==
Gold certificates, along with all other U.S. currency, were made in two sizes—a larger size from 1865 to 1928, and a smaller size beginning with the series of 1928. The backs of all large-sized notes (and also the small-sized notes of the Series of 1934) were orange, resulting in the nickname "yellow boys" or "goldbacks". The backs of the Series of 1928 bills were green, and identical to the corresponding denomination of the more familiar Federal Reserve Notes, including the usual buildings on the $10 through $100 designs and the less-known abstract designs of denominations $500 and up. Both large and small size gold certificates feature a gold treasury seal on the obverse, just as U.S. Notes feature a red seal, silver certificates (except World War II Hawaii and North Africa notes) a blue seal, and Federal Reserve Notes a green seal.

In the case of the Series 1928 (small-size) gold certificates, they bore a redemption statement with the following text: "This certifies that there have been deposited in the Treasury of the United States of America XXXXX Dollars in Gold Coin payable to the bearer on demand."

=== Series of 1900 $10,000 Gold Certificates ===
Along with the $5,000 and $10,000 of the Series of 1888, all 1900 bills ($10,000 denomination only) have been redeemed, and no longer have legal tender status. Most were destroyed, with the exception of a number of 1900 $10,000 bills that were in a box in a post office near the U.S. Treasury in Washington, D.C. There was a fire on December 13, 1935, and employees threw burning boxes out into the street in an attempt to keep the documents inside from fueling the fire. The box of canceled high-denomination currency burst open, and the scattered notes were collected by opportunistic passerby, although they were technically worthless, having been already redeemed. There are several hundred outstanding, and their ownership is technically illegal, as they are stolen property. However, due to their lack of intrinsic value, the government has not prosecuted any owners, citing more important concerns. They carry a collector value in the numismatic market and, as noted in Bowers and Sundman's The 100 Greatest American Currency Notes, the only United States notes that can be purchased for less than their face value. This is the only example of "circulating" U.S. currency that is not an obligation of the government, and thus not redeemable by a Federal Reserve Bank. The note bears the portrait of Andrew Jackson and has no printed design on its reverse side.

== End of the Gold Certificate Era in the United States (March 1933) ==
As part of the Roosevelt Administration's response to the effects of the Great Depression and particularly the outflow of gold for hoarding and for shipment overseas, the practice of redeeming gold certificates for gold coin was ended by Presidential Proclamation 2039 (dated March 6, 1933) and Executive Order 6073 (dated March 10, 1933). On April 5, 1933, Executive Order 6102 was issued; it required all persons in the United States to deliver (with limited exceptions) all gold coin, gold bullion, and gold certificates to the Federal Reserve by May 1, 1933. By order of the Secretary of the Treasury dated December 28, 1933, private possession of gold certificates was declared illegal. Due to their (then-) illegal status and public fear that the notes would be devalued and made obsolete, this resulted in the majority of circulating notes being retired.

The restrictions on private ownership of gold certificates were revoked by Treasury Secretary Douglas Dillon effective April 24, 1964, primarily to allow collectors to own examples legally; however, gold certificates are no longer redeemable for gold, but instead can be exchanged at face value for other U.S. coin and currency designated as legal tender (e.g., Federal Reserve Notes and United States Notes). In general, the notes are scarce and valuable, especially examples in "new" condition.

=== Series of 1934 Gold Certificates; Modern usage by the Federal Reserve System ===
The Gold Reserve Act of 1934 established a new accounting mechanism, through the issue of a special series of gold certificates, to account for gold held by the Federal Reserve Banks on behalf of the United States. The Secretary of the Treasury is authorized to "prescribe the form and denominations of the certificates".

The Series of 1934 (bearing the signatures of William Alexander Julian (Treasurer) and Henry Morgenthau (Treasury Secretary)) consisted of the following denominations: $100; $1,000; and $10,000 (mirroring the circulating Federal Reserve Notes of the same series and denominations). However, there was also a $100,000 denomination (bearing the portrait of President Woodrow Wilson) that had no equivalent in other types of U.S. currency and was also the largest currency denomination ever issued by the United States Treasury. 42,000 of the $100,000 denomination were printed. According to the Bureau of Engraving and Printing's own website, the $100,000 certificates were printed between December 18, 1934, and January 9, 1935. These notes were never intended for circulation in the general economy and there are no known instances of any such certificates ever being released outside government channels, other than as specimens such as one recently graded by PMG.

Reflecting the purpose for which these certificates were issued, the redemption statement on their face was changed to read as follows: "This certifies that there is on deposit in the Treasury of the United States of America XXXXX Dollars in Gold payable to bearer on demand as authorized by law."

Since the 1960s, most of the paper certificates have been destroyed, and the currently prescribed form of the "certificates" issued to the Federal Reserve is an electronic book entry account between the Federal Reserve and the Treasury. The electronic book entry system also allows for the various regional Federal Reserve Banks to exchange certificate balances among themselves. However, the Treasury authorized a small amount of them to be retained at certain Federal Reserve Banks (where they had been used) for educational and historical purposes, such as being placed on public display. In addition, a $100,000 Series of 1934 gold certificate is part of the numismatic collection at the Smithsonian's National Museum of American History.

As of December 2013, the Federal Reserve reported holding $11.037 billion (face value) of these certificates. The Treasury backs these certificates by holding an equivalent amount of gold at the statutory exchange rate of $42 2/9 per troy ounce of gold, though the Federal Reserve does not have the right to exchange the certificates for gold. As the certificates are denominated in dollars rather than in a set weight of gold, any change in the statutory exchange rate towards the (much higher) market rate would result in a windfall accounting gain for the Treasury.

== Series and varieties ==
Series and varieties of large-size gold certificates
Series	Value	Features/varieties
1865 (Note: Notes issued under a given Series (e.g., Series 1882, Series 1907) are, in some cases, released over a period of years, as reflected in the Friedberg number signature and seal varieties. For example, based on dates of the signature combinations, the Series 1907 $10 gold certificate was first issued with the signature combination of Vernon and Treat (in office together from 1906 to 1909) and last issued with the Teehee and Burke signatures (in office together from 1915 to 1919). Therefore, a Series 1907 note could have been issued as late as 1919.)	$20; $100; $500; $1000; $5,000; $10,000	Notes from this first issue are extremely rare in lower ($20 and $100) denominations. A single $1,000 and $5,000 are reported to exist in a government collection, and an issued $500 or $10,000 has never been seen. In addition to the two engraved signatures customary on United States banknotes (the Register of the Treasury and Treasurer of the United States), the earlier issues of Gold certificates (i.e., 1865, 1870, 1875, and some 1882) included a third signature of one of the Assistant Treasurers of the United States (in New York or Washington, D.C.). Known as a countersigned or triple-signature note, this feature existed for all Series prior to 1882 (and the first printing of the Series 1882).
1870–75	$100; $500; $1,000; $5,000; $10,000	Series 1870 notes introduced portraits to gold certificates. Both Series of 1870 and Series of 1875 are countersigned notes. Between the two series, the $100 is extremely rare, the $500, $1,000, and $10,000 are unique (in government collections), and the $5,000 is unknown.
1882	$20; $50; $100; $500; $1,000; $5,000; $10,000	The Act of July 12, 1882, authorized denominations "not less than $20".
1888	$5,000; $10,000	Series 1888 notes were intended for bank use to balance accounts without having to transport large volumes of gold bullion or currency. They have all been redeemed.
1900	$10,000	Canceled -- Not legal tender. Several hundred notes exist and examples occasionally appear for sale. See above.
1905	$20	
1906	$20	
1907	$10; $1,000	
1913	$50	
1922	$10; $20; $50; $100; $500; $1000	

=== Complete United States gold certificate type set ===
==== Large ====
Large-size United States gold certificates
Value	Issue	Series	Fr.	Image	Portrait	Signature & seal varieties
$20	1st	1865	Fr.1166b	Image pending	Vignettes of eagle with shield	1166b – Colby and Spinner – small red
$100	1st	1865	Fr.1166c	$100 Gold Certificate, Series 1865, Fr.1166c, with a vignette of an eagle and shield (left) and justice (bottom center).	Vignette of eagle with shield	1166c – Colby and Spinner – small red
$500	1st	1865	Fr.1166d proof	$500 Gold Certificate, Series 1865, Fr.1166d, with a vignette of an eagle and shield (left) and justice (bottom center).	Vignette of eagle with shield	1166d – Colby and Spinner – small red
$1,000	1st	1865	Fr.1166e proof	$1,000 Gold Certificate, Series 1865, Fr.1166e, with a vignette of an eagle and shield (left) and justice (bottom center).	Vignettes of eagle with shield, and justice with scales.	1166e – Colby and Spinner – small red
$5,000	1st	1865	Fr.1166f proof	$5,000 Gold Certificate, Series 1865, Fr.1166f, with a vignette of an eagle and shield (left) and justice (bottom center).	Vignettes of eagle with shield and female	1166f – Colby and Spinner – small red
$10,000	1st	1865	Fr.1166g proof	$10,000 Gold Certificate, Series 1865, Fr.1166g, with a vignette of an eagle and shield (left) and justice (bottom center).	Vignettes of eagle with shield	1166g – Colby and Spinner – small red
$100	2nd & 3rd	1870–75	Fr.1166h	$100 Gold Certificate, Series 1875, Fr.1166h, depicting Thomas Hart Benton	Thomas Hart Benton	1166h – xxx and xxx – large red (1870); 1166m – Allison and New – large red (1875)
$500	2nd & 3rd	1870–75	Fr.1166i	$500 Gold Certificate, Series 1870, Fr.1166i, depicting Abraham Lincoln	Abraham Lincoln	1166i – Allison and Tuttle – large red (1870); 1166n – Allison and New – large red (1875)
$1,000	2nd & 3rd	1870–75	Fr.1166j proof	$1,000 Gold Certificate, Series 1875, Fr.1166j, depicting Alexander Hamilton	Alexander Hamilton	1166j – xxx and xxx – large red (1870); 1166o – Allison and New – large red (1875)
$5,000	2nd & 3rd	1870–75	Fr.1166k proof	$5,000 Gold Certificate, Series 1870, Fr.1166k, depicting James Madison	James Madison	1166k – Allison and Gilfillan – large red
$10,000	2nd & 3rd	1870–75	Fr.1166l proof	$10,000 Gold Certificate, Series 1875, Fr.1166l, depicting Andrew Jackson	Andrew Jackson	1166l – xxx and xxx – large red (1870); 1166q – Allison and Wyman – large red (1875)
$10	7th	1907	Fr.1172	$10 Gold Certificate, Series 1907, Fr.1172, depicting Michael Hillegas	Michael Hillegas	1167 – 1172 1167 – Vernon and Treat – Gold; 1168 – Vernon and McClung – Gold; 1169 – Napier and McClung – Gold, Act of 1882; 1169a – Napier and McClung – Gold, Act of 1907; 1170 – Napier and Thompson – Gold, Act of 1882; 1170a – Napier and Thompson – Gold, Act of 1907; 1171 – Parker and Burke – Gold 1172 – Teehee and Burke – Gold
$10	9th	1922	Fr.1173	$10 Gold Certificate, Series 1922, Fr.1173, depicting Michael Hillegas	Michael Hillegas	1173 – Speelman and White – Gold 1173a – Speelman and White – Gold, small serial numbers
$20	4th	1882	Fr.1175a	$20 Gold Certificate, Series 1882, Fr.1175a, depicting James Garfield	James Garfield	1174 – 1178 1174 – Bruce and Gilfillan – brown 1175* – Bruce and Gilfillan – brown, CS by Thomas C. Acton; 1175a – Bruce and Gilfillan – brown, CS by Thomas C. Acton; 1176 – Bruce and Wyman – brown 1177 – Rosecrans and Huston – large brown 1178 – Lyons and Roberts – small red
$20	4th	1882	Fr.1177	$20 Gold Certificate, Series 1882, Fr.1177, depicting James Garfield	James Garfield	
$20	7th	1905	Fr.1180	$20 Gold Certificate, Series 1905, Fr.1180, depicting George Washington	George Washington	1179 – Lyons and Roberts – small red 1180 – Lyons and Treat – small red
$20	7th	1906	Fr.1185	$20 Gold Certificate, Series 1906, Fr.1185, depicting George Washington	George Washington	1181 – 1186 1181 – Vernon and Treat – Gold; 1182 – Vernon and McClung – Gold; 1183 – Napier and McClung – Gold; 1184 – Napier and Thompson – Gold; 1185 – Parker and Burke – Gold 1186 – Teehee and Burke – Gold
$20	9th	1922	Fr.1187	$20 Gold Certificate, Series 1922, Fr.1187, depicting George Washington	George Washington	1187 – Speelman and White – Gold
$50	4th	1882	Fr.1189a	$50 Gold Certificate, Series 1882, Fr.1189a, depicting Silas Wright	Silas Wright	1188 – 1197 1188 – Bruce and Gilfillan – brown 1189* – Bruce and Gilfillan – brown, CS by Thomas C. Acton; 1189a – Bruce and Gilfillan – brown, CS by Thomas C. Acton; 1190 – Bruce and Wyman – brown 1191 – Rosecrans and Hyatt – large red 1192 – Rosecrans and Huston – large brown 1192a – Rosecrans and Huston – small red 1193 – Lyons and Roberts – small red 1194 – Lyons and Treat – small red 1195 – Vernon and Treat – small red 1196 – Vernon and McClung – small red 1197 – Napier and McClung – small red
$50	4th	1882	Fr.1195	$50 Gold Certificate, Series 1882, Fr.1195, depicting Silas Wright	Silas Wright	
$50	9th	1913	Fr.1199	$50 Gold Certificate, Series 1913, Fr.1199, depicting Ulysses Grant	Ulysses S. Grant	1198 – Parker and Burke – Gold 1199 – Teehee and Burke – Gold
$50	9th	1922	Fr.1200a	$50 Gold Certificate, Series 1922, Fr.1200a, depicting Ulysses Grant	Ulysses S. Grant	1200 – Speelman and White – Gold 1200a – Speelman and White – Gold, small serial numbers
$100	4th	1882	Fr.1202	$100 Gold Certificate, Series 1882, Fr.1202, depicting Thomas Hart Benton	Thomas Hart Benton	1201 – 1214 1201 – Bruce and Gilfillan – brown 1202* – Bruce and Gilfillan – brown, CS by Thomas C. Acton; 1202a – Bruce and Gilfillan – brown, CS by Thomas C. Acton; 1203 – Bruce and Wyman – brown 1204 – Rosecrans and Hyatt – large red 1205 – Rosecrans and Huston – large brown 1206 – Lyons and Roberts – small red 1207 – Lyons and Treat – small red 1208 – Vernon and Treat – small red 1209 – Vernon and McClung – small red 1210 – Napier and McClung – small red 1211 – Napier and Thompson – small red 1212 – Napier and Burke – small red 1213 – Parker and Burke – small red 1214 – Teehee and Burke – small red
$100	4th	1882	Fr.1207	$100 Gold Certificate, Series 1882, Fr.xxxx, depicting Thomas Hart Benton	Thomas Hart Benton	
$100	9th	1922	Fr.1215	$100 Gold Certificate, Series 1922, Fr.xxxx, depicting Thomas Hart Benton	Thomas Hart Benton	1215 – Speelman and White – small red
$500	4th	1882	Fr.1216a	$500 Gold Certificate, Series 1882, Fr.xxxx, depicting Abraham Lincoln	Abraham Lincoln	1215a – 1216b 1215a – Bruce and Gilfillan – brown 1215b – Bruce and Gilfillan – brown, CS by Thomas C. Acton; 1215c – Bruce and Wyman – brown 1215d – Rosecrans and Hyatt – large red 1216 – Lyons and Roberts – small red 1216a – Parker and Burke – small red 1216b – Teehee and Burke – small red
$500	9th	1922	Fr.1217	$500 Gold Certificate, Series 1922, Fr.xxxx, depicting Abraham Lincoln	Abraham Lincoln	1217 – Speelman and White – small red
$1,000	4th	1882	Fr.1218a	$1,000 Gold Certificate, Series 1882, Fr.1218a, depicting Alexander Hamilton	Alexander Hamilton	1218 – 1218g 1218 – Bruce and Gilfillan –brown 1218a* – Bruce and Gilfillan –brown, CS by Thomas C. Acton; 1218b – Bruce and Wyman – brown 1218c – Rosecrans and Hyatt –large red 1218d – Rosecrans and Huston – large brown 1218e – Rosecrans and Nebecker – small red 1218f – Lyons and Roberts – small red 1218g – Lyons and Treat – small red
$1,000	4th	1882	Fr.1218g	$1,000 Gold Certificate, Series 1882, Fr.1218g, depicting Alexander Hamilton	Alexander Hamilton	
$1,000	8th	1907	Fr.1219	$1,000 Gold Certificate, Series 1907, Fr.1219, depicting Alexander Hamilton	Alexander Hamilton	1219 – 1219e 1219 – Vernon and Treat – Gold; 1219a – Vernon and McClung – Gold; 1219b – Napier and McClung – Gold; 1219c – Napier and Burke – Gold; 1219d – Parker and Burke – Gold 1219e – Teehee and Burke – Gold
$1,000	9th	1922	Fr.1220	$1,000 Gold Certificate, Series 1922, Fr.1220, depicting Alexander Hamilton	Alexander Hamilton	1220 – Speelman and White – Gold
$5,000	4th	1882	Fr.1221a proof	$5,000 Gold Certificate, Series 1882, Fr.1221a, depicting James Madison	James Madison	1221 – 1221j 1221 – Bruce and Gilfillan – brown 1221a* – Bruce and Gilfillan – brown, CS by Thomas C. Acton; 1221b – Bruce and Wyman – brown 1221c – Rosecrans and Hyatt – large red 1221d – Rosecrans and Nebecker – small red 1221e – Lyons and Roberts – small red 1221f – Vernon and Treat – small red 1221g – Vernon and McClung – small red 1221h – Napier and McClung – small red 1221i – Parker and Burke – small red 1221j – Teehee and Burke – small red
$5,000	5th	1888	Fr.1222a proof	$5,000 Gold Certificate, Series 1888, Fr.1222a, depicting James Madison	James Madison	1222 – Rosecrans and Hyatt – large red 1222a – Rosecrans and Nebecker – small red
$10,000	4th	1882	Fr.1223a proof	$10,000 Gold Certificate, Series 1882, Fr.1223a, depicting Andrew Jackson	Andrew Jackson	1223 – 1223g 1223 – Bruce and Gilfillan – brown 1223a – Bruce and Gilfillan – brown, CS by Thomas C. Acton; 1223b – Bruce and Wyman – brown 1223c – Rosecrans and Hyatt – large red 1223d – Rosecrans and Nebecker – small red 1223e – Lyons and Roberts – small red 1223f – Vernon and Treat – small red 1223g – Teehee and Burke – small red
$10,000	5th	1888	Fr.1224a proof	$10,000 Gold Certificate, Series 1888, Fr.1224a, depicting Andrew Jackson	Andrew Jackson	1224 – Rosecrans and Hyatt – large red 1224a – Rosecrans and Nebecker – small red
$10,000	6th	1900 (Note: There was a massive fire in a new Post Office building at the corner of 12th and Pennsylvania, in Washington D.C., on Friday, December 13, 1935. At the time, part of the 6th floor was being used for Treasury Department storage. Fire Fighters threw many boxes of documents out of the windows and into the streets below. One such box contained almost every surviving piece of the series 1900 Gold Certificates. Passersby quickly grabbed them up off the street, although all of the notes had been previously redeemed and canceled. Treasury records indicate that there are no outstanding redeemable notes of this series.)	Fr.1225	$10,000 Gold Certificate, Series 1900, Fr.1225, depicting Andrew Jackson	Andrew Jackson	1225a – 1225h 1225a – Lyons and Roberts – small red 1225b – Lyons and Treat – small red 1225c – Vernon and Treat – small red 1225d – Vernon and McClung – small red 1225e – Napier and McClung – small red 1225f – Napier and Burke – small red 1225g – Parker and Burke – small red 1225h – Teehee and Burke – small red

==== Small ====
Small-size United States Gold Certificates
Value	Series	Fr.	Image	Portrait	Signature & seal varieties
$10	1928	Fr.2400	$10 Gold Certificate, Series 1928, Fr.2400, depicting Alexander Hamilton	Alexander Hamilton	2400 – Woods and Mellon – gold 2401 – Woods and Mellon (1928A) – gold.
$20	1928	Fr.2402	$20 Gold Certificate, Series 1928, Fr.2402, depicting Andrew Jackson	Andrew Jackson	2402 – Woods and Mellon – gold 2403 – Woods and Mills (1928A) – gold.
$50	1928	Fr.2404	$50 Gold Certificate, Series 1928, Fr.2404, depicting Ulysses Grant	Ulysses Grant	2404 – Woods and Mellon – gold
$100	1928	Fr.2405	$100 Gold Certificate, Series 1928, Fr.2405, depicting Benjamin Franklin	Benjamin Franklin	2405 – Woods and Mellon – gold.
$500	1928	Fr.2407	$500 Gold Certificate, Series 1928, Fr.2407, depicting William McKinley	William McKinley	2407 – Woods and Mellon – gold.
$1,000	1928	Fr.2408	$1,000 Gold Certificate, Series 1928, Fr.2408, depicting Grover Cleveland	Grover Cleveland	2408 – Woods and Mellon – gold.
$5,000	1928	Fr.2410	$5,000 Gold Certificate, Series 1928, Fr.2410, depicting James Madison	James Madison	2410 – Woods and Mellon – gold.
$10,000	1928	Fr.2411	$10,000 Gold Certificate, Series 1928, Fr.2411, depicting Salmon P. Chase	Salmon P. Chase	2411 – Woods and Mellon – gold.
$100	1934	Fr.2406	$100 Gold Certificate, Series 1934, Fr.2406, depicting Benjamin Franklin	Benjamin Franklin	2406 – Julian and Morgenthau – gold.
$1,000	1934	Fr.2409	$1,000 Gold Certificate, Series 1934, Fr.2409, depicting Grover Cleveland	Grover Cleveland	2409 – Julian and Morgenthau – gold.
$10,000	1934	Fr.2412	$10,000 Gold Certificate, Series 1934, Fr.2412, depicting Salmon P. Chase	Salmon P. Chase	2412 – Julian and Morgenthau – gold.
$100,000	1934	Fr.2413	$100,000 Gold Certificate, Series 1934, Fr.2413, depicting Woodrow Wilson	Woodrow Wilson	2413 – Julian and Morgenthau – gold.

== Series catalogue ==
This is a chart of some of the series of gold certificates printed. Each entry includes: series year, general description, and printing figures if available.

=== Small-size gold certificates ===
Small-size gold certificates
Series	Denominations	Signatures	Printing Figure
1928	$10	W. O. Woods – Andrew W. Mellon	33,356,000
1928	$20	W. O. Woods – Andrew W. Mellon	67,704,000
1928	$50	W. O. Woods – Andrew W. Mellon	5,520,000
1928	$100	W. O. Woods – Andrew W. Mellon	3,240,000
1928A	$100	W. O. Woods – Ogden L. Mills	120,000*
1934	$100	W. A. Julian – Henry Morgenthau Jr.	120,000*
1928	$500	W. O. Woods – Andrew W. Mellon	420,000
1928	$1,000	W. O. Woods – Andrew W. Mellon	288,000
1934	$1,000	W. A. Julian – Henry Morgenthau Jr.	84,000*
1928	$5,000	W. O. Woods – Andrew W. Mellon	24,000
1928	$10,000	W. O. Woods – Andrew W. Mellon	48,000
1934	$10,000	W. A. Julian – Henry Morgenthau Jr.	36,000*
1934	$100,000	W. A. Julian – Henry Morgenthau Jr.	42,000*

* Notes: All Series 1928A gold certificates were consigned to destruction and never released; none are known to exist.

== See also ==
- Silver certificate (United States)
- National gold bank note
- Digital gold currency
