= Silver certificate (United States) =

Paper currency used between 1878 and 1964

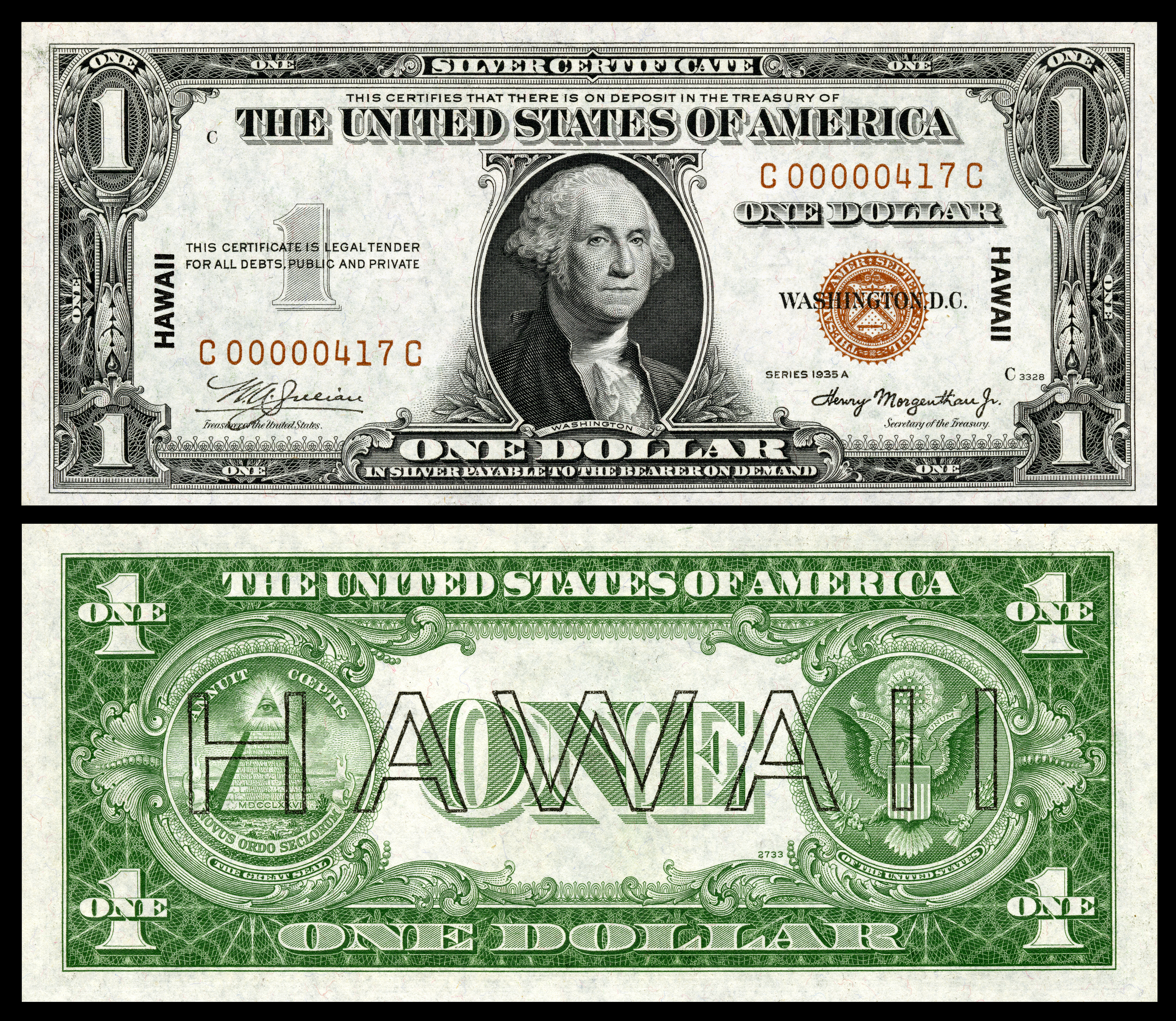
The $1 silver certificate from the Hawaii overprint series

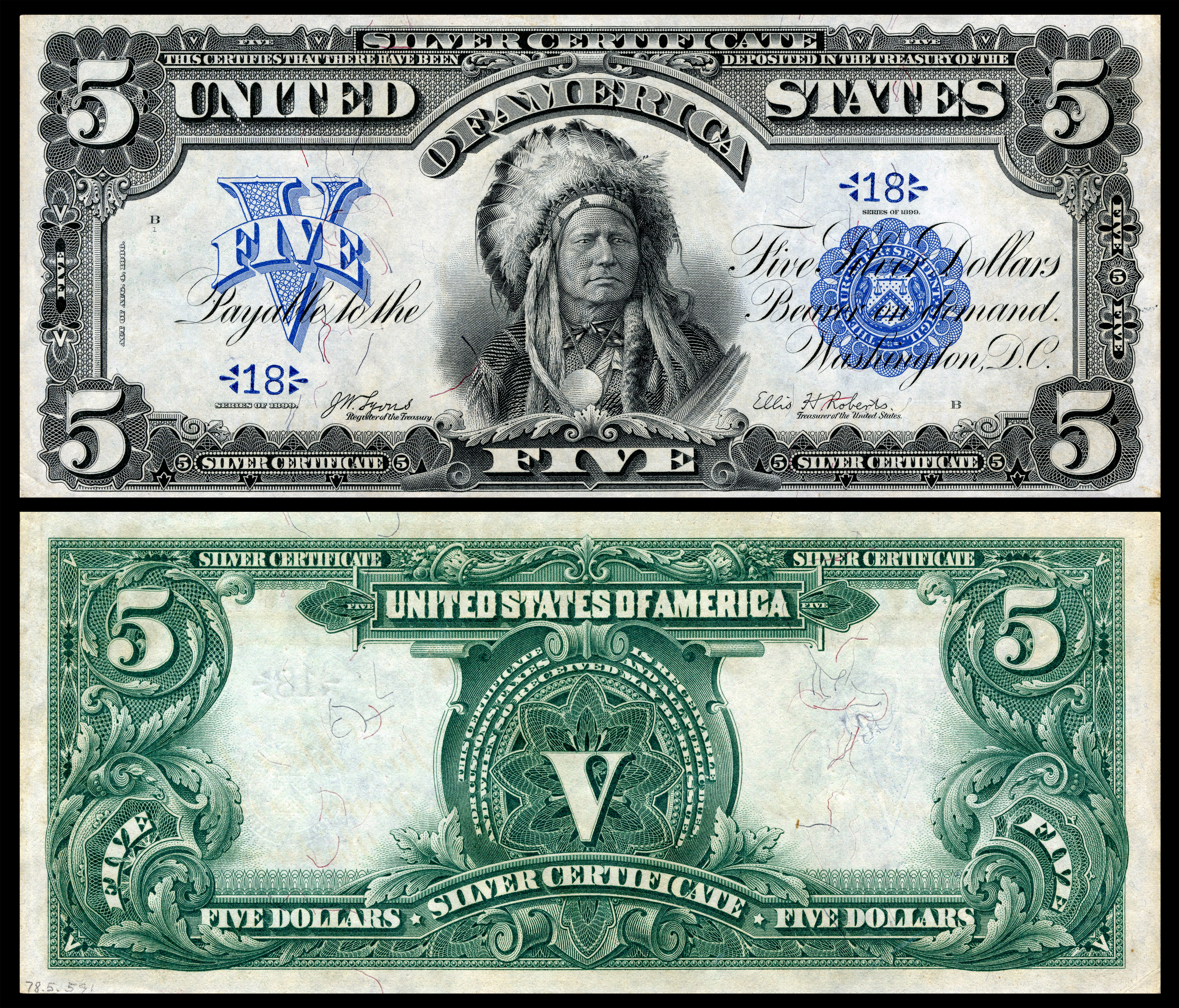
1899 United States five-dollar Silver Certificate (Chief Note) depicting Running Antelope of the Húŋkpapȟa

Silver certificates are a type of representative money issued between 1878 and 1964 in the United States as part of its circulation of paper currency. They were produced in response to silver agitation by citizens who were angered by the Coinage Act of 1873, which had effectively placed the United States on a gold standard. The certificates were initially redeemable for their face value of silver dollar coins and later (for one year from June 24, 1967, to June 24, 1968) in raw silver bullion. Since 1968 they have been redeemable only in Federal Reserve Notes and are thus obsolete, but still valid legal tender at their face value and thus are still an accepted form of currency.

Large-size silver certificates, generally 1.5 in (38 mm) longer and 0.5 in (13 mm) wider than modern U.S. paper currency, (1878 to 1923) (Note: Large size notes represent the earlier types or series of U.S. banknotes. Their "average" dimension is 7.375 × 3.125 inches (187 × 79 mm). Small size notes (described as such due to their size relative to the earlier large size notes) are an "average" 6.125 × 2.625 inches (156 × 67 mm), the size of modern U.S. currency. "Each measurement is +/- 0.08 inches (2mm) to account for margins and cutting".) were issued initially in denominations from $10 to $1,000 (in 1878 and 1880) and in 1886 the $1, $2, and $5 were authorized. In 1928, all United States bank notes were re-designed and the size reduced. The small-size silver certificate (1928–1964) was only regularly issued in denominations of $1, $5, and $10. The complete type set below is part of the National Numismatic Collection at the Smithsonian's National Museum of American History.

== History ==
The Coinage Act of 1873 intentionally omitted language authorizing the coinage of "standard" silver dollars and ended the bimetallic standard that had been created by Alexander Hamilton. (Note: Some have suggested that the bimetallic standard was actually initiated by Thomas Jefferson.) While the Coinage Act of 1873 stopped production of silver dollars, it was the 1874 adoption of Section 3568 of the Revised Statutes that actually removed legal tender status from silver certificates in the payment of debts exceeding five dollars. By 1875 business interests invested in silver (e.g., Western banks, mining companies) wanted the bimetallic standard restored. People began to refer to the passage of the Act as the Crime of '73. Prompted by a sharp decline in the value of silver in 1876, Congressional representatives from Nevada and Colorado, states responsible for over 40% of the world's silver yield in the 1870s and 1880s, began lobbying for change. Further public agitation for silver use was driven by fear that there was not enough money in the community. Members of Congress claimed ignorance that the 1873 law would lead to the demonetization of silver, despite having had three years to review the bill prior to enacting it to law. Some blamed the passage of the Act on a number of external factors including a conspiracy involving foreign investors and government conspirators. In response, the Bland–Allison Act, as it came to be known, was passed by Congress (over a presidential veto) on February 28, 1878. It did not provide for the "free and unlimited coinage of silver" demanded by Western miners, but it did require the United States Treasury to purchase between $2 million and $4 million of silver bullion per month from mining companies in the West, to be minted into coins. (Note: Although the exact monthly purchase was left to the discretion of the Secretary of the Treasury, the $2 million minimum was never exceeded.)

=== Large-size silver certificates ===
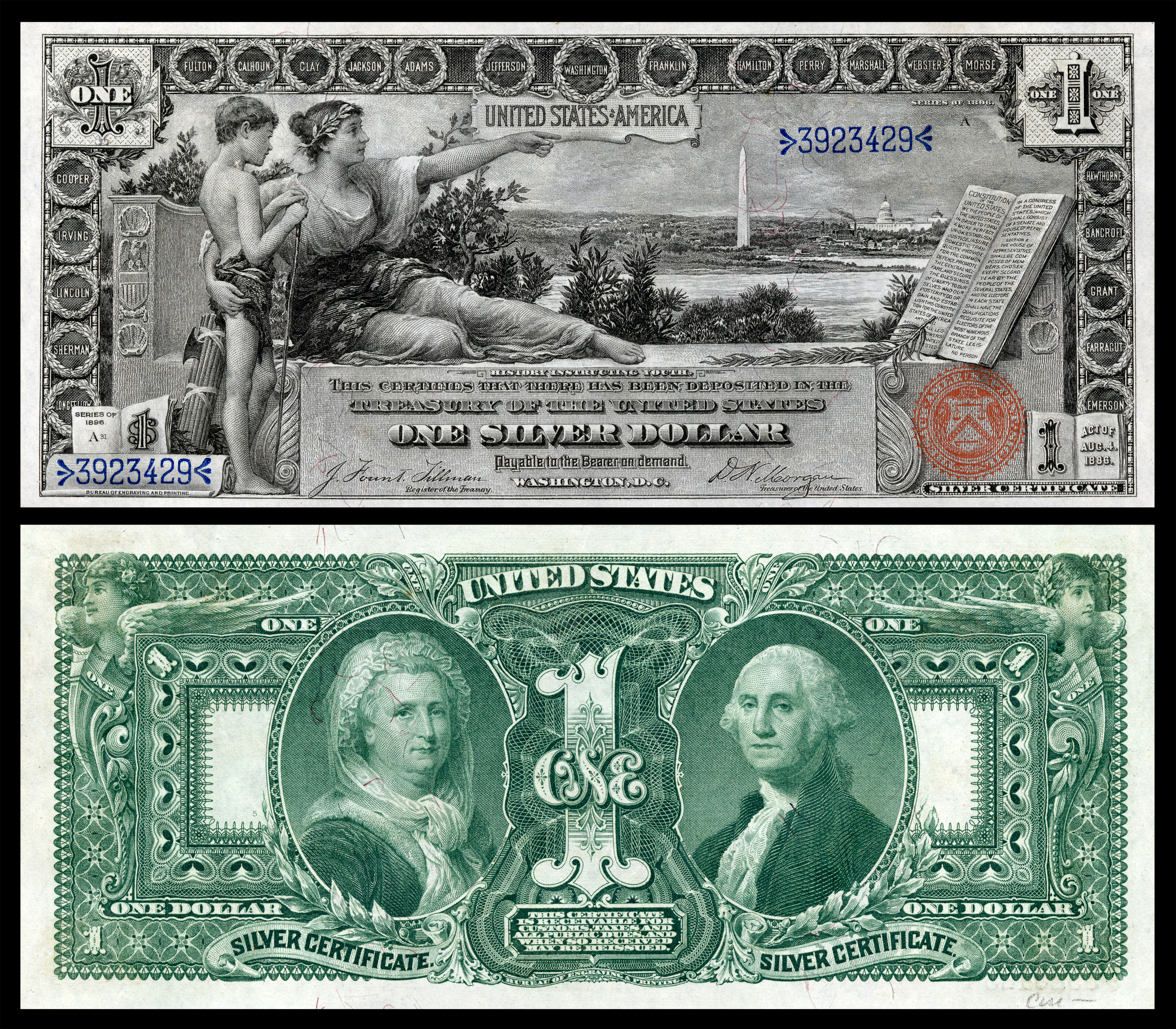
Educational Series History Instructing Youth one-dollar silver certificate (1896). National Numismatic Collection

The first silver certificates (Series 1878) were issued in denominations of $10 through $1,000. (Note: "The act of February 28, 1878, also authorized the holder of these silver dollars to deposit: the same with the Treasurer, or any Assistant Treasurer, of the United States, in sums not less than ten dollars, and receive therefor certificates of not less than ten dollars each, corresponding with the denominations of the United States notes.") Reception by financial institutions was cautious. While more convenient and less bulky than dollar coins, the silver certificate was not accepted for all transactions. The Bland–Allison Act established that they were "receivable for customs, taxes, and all public dues," and could be included in bank reserves, but silver certificates were not explicitly considered legal tender for private interactions (i.e., between individuals). Congress used the National Banking Act of July 12, 1882, to clarify the legal tender status of silver certificates by clearly authorizing them to be included in the lawful reserves of national banks. A general appropriations act of August 4, 1886, authorized the issue of $1, $2, and $5 silver certificates. The introduction of low-denomination currency (as denominations of U.S. Notes under $5 were put on hold) greatly increased circulation. Over the 12-year lifespan of the Bland–Allison Act, the United States government would receive a seigniorage amounting to roughly $68 million (between $3 and $9 million per year), while absorbing over 60% of U.S. silver production.

=== Small-size silver certificates ===
Treasury Secretary Franklin MacVeagh (1909–13) appointed a committee to investigate possible advantages (e.g., reduced cost, increased production speed) to issuing smaller sized United States banknotes. Due in part to the outbreak of World War I and the end of his appointed term, any recommendations may have stalled. On August 20, 1925, Treasury Secretary Andrew W. Mellon appointed a similar committee and in May 1927 accepted their recommendations for the size reduction and redesign of U.S. banknotes. On July 10, 1929, the new small-size currency was issued.

In keeping with the verbiage on large-size silver certificates, all the small-size Series 1928 certificates carried the obligation "This certifies that there has (or have) been deposited in the Treasury of the United States of America X silver dollar(s) payable to the bearer on demand" or "X dollars in silver coin payable to the bearer on demand". This required that the Treasury maintain stocks of silver dollars to back and redeem the silver certificates in circulation. Beginning with the Series 1934 silver certificates the wording was changed to "This certifies that there is on deposit in the Treasury of the United States of America X dollars in silver payable to the bearer on demand." This freed the Treasury from storing bags of silver dollars in its vaults, and allowed it to redeem silver certificates with bullion or silver granules, rather than silver dollars. Years after the government stopped the redemption of silver certificates for silver, large quantities of silver dollars intended specifically to satisfy the earlier obligation for redemption in silver dollars were found in Treasury vaults.

The 1928 and 1934 series one-dollar silver certificate came to be known as a Funnyback because of the image on the reverse. People called the note the Funnyback based on the dramatically lighter green ink used on the reverse and unusually large font which was used for the word "ONE" in the center of the design. The obverse carries the portrait of the first American president, George Washington.

As was usual with currency during this period, the year date on the bill did not reflect when it was printed, but rather a major design change. Under the Silver Purchase Act of 1934, the authority to issue silver certificates was given to the U.S. Secretary of Treasury. Additional changes, particularly when either of the two signatures was altered, led to a letter being added below the date. One notable exception was the Series 1935G $1 silver certificate, which included notes both with and without the motto "In God We Trust" on the reverse. 1935 dated one dollar certificates lasted through the letter "H", after which new printing processes began the 1957 series. In some cases printing plates were used until they wore out, even though newer ones were also producing notes, so the sequencing of signatures may not always be chronological. Thus some of the 1935 dated one dollar certificates were issued as late as 1963.

=== World War II Issues ===
In response to the Japanese attack on Pearl Harbor, the Hawaii overprint note was ordered from the Bureau of Engraving and Printing on June 8, 1942 (all were made-over 1934–1935 bills). Issued in denominations of $1, $5, $10, and $20, only the $1 was a silver certificate, the others were Federal Reserve Notes. Stamped "HAWAII" (in small solid letters on the obverse and large hollow letters on the reverse), with the Treasury seal and serial numbers in brown instead of the usual blue, these notes could be demonetized in the event of a Japanese invasion. Additional World War II emergency currency was issued in November 1942 for circulation in Europe and Northern Africa. Printed with a bright yellow seal, these notes ($1, $5, and $10) could be demonetized should the United States lose its position in the European or North African campaigns.

=== "Star notes" ===
When a bill is damaged in printing it is normally replaced by another one (the star replaces a letter at the edge of the note). To keep the amounts issued consistent, these replacement banknotes are normally indicated by a star in the separately sequenced serial number. For silver certificates this asterisk appears at the beginning of the serial number.

=== End of the silver certificates ===
In the nearly three decades since passage of the Silver Purchase Act of 1934, the annual demand for silver bullion rose steadily from roughly 11 million ounces (1933) to 110 million ounces (1962). The Acts of 1939 and 1946 established floor prices for silver of 71 cents and 90.5 cents (respectively) per ounce. Predicated on an anticipated shortage of silver bullion, Public Law 88-36 (PL88-36) was enacted on June 4, 1963, which repealed the Silver Purchase Act of 1934, and the Acts of July 6, 1939, and July 31, 1946, while providing specific instruction regarding the disposition of silver held as reserves against issued certificates and the price at which silver may be sold. (Note: "SEC. 2. The Secretary of the Treasury shall maintain the ownership and the possession or control within the United States of an amount of silver of a monetary value equal to the face amount of all outstanding silver certificates. Unless the market price of silver exceeds its monetary value, the Secretary of the Treasury shall not dispose of any silver held or owned by the United States in excess of that required to be held as reserves against outstanding silver certificates, but any such excess silver may be sold to other departments and agencies of the Government or used for the coinage of standard silver dollars and subsidiary silver coins. Silver certificates shall be exchangeable on demand at the Treasury of the United States for silver dollars or, at the option of the Secretary of the Treasury, at such places as he may designate, for silver bullion of a monetary value equal to the face amount of the certificates".) It also amended the Federal Reserve Act to authorize the issue of lower denomination notes (i.e., $1 and $2), allowing for the gradual retirement (or swapping out process) of $1 silver certificates and releasing silver bullion from reserve. In repealing the earlier laws, PL88-36 also repealed the authority of the Secretary of the Treasury to control the issue of silver certificates. By issuing Executive Order 11110, President John F. Kennedy was able to continue the Secretary's authority. While retaining their status as legal tender, the silver certificate had effectively been retired from use.

In March 1964, Secretary of the Treasury C. Douglas Dillon halted redemption of silver certificates for silver dollar coins; during the following four years, silver certificates were redeemable in uncoined silver "granules". All redemption in silver ceased on June 24, 1968. While there are some exceptions (particularly for some of the very early issues as well as the experimental bills) the vast majority of small sized one dollar silver certificates, especially non-star or worn bills of the 1935 and 1957 series, are worth little or nothing above their face values. They can still occasionally be found in circulation.

== Issue ==
=== Large-size United States silver certificates (1878–1923) ===
==== Series and varieties ====
Series and varieties of large-size silver certificates
Series	Value	Features/varieties
1878 and 1880 (Note: Notes issued under a given Series (e.g., Series 1880, Series 1899) are, in some cases, released over a period of years, as reflected in the Friedberg number signature and seal varieties. For example, based on dates of the signature combinations, the Series 1899 $1 silver certificate was first issued with the signature combination of Lyons and Robert (in office together from 1898 to 1905) and last issued with the Speelman and White signatures (in office together from 1922 to 1927). Therefore, a Series 1899 note could have been issued as late as 1927.)	$10; $20; $50; $100; $500; $1,000	In addition to the two engraved signatures customary on United States banknotes (the Register of the Treasury and Treasurer of the United States), the first issue of the Series 1878 notes (similar to the early Gold Certificate) included a third signature of one of the Assistant Treasurers of the United States (in New York, San Francisco, or Washington DC). Known as a countersigned or triple-signature note, this feature existed for the first run of notes issued in 1880, but was then removed from the remaining 1880 issues.
1886	$1; $2; $5; $10; $20	The Act of August 4, 1886, authorized the issue of lower denomination ($1, $2, and $5) silver certificates. Similar to the Series 1878/1880 notes, the Treasury seal characteristics (size, color, and style) varies with the change of the Treasury signatures. The series is known for the ornate engraving on the reverse of the note.
1891	$1; $2; $5; $10; $20; $50; $100; $1,000	The Bureau of Engraving and Printing introduced the process of "resizing" paper for Series 1891 notes.
1896	$1; $2; $5	The Educational Series is considered to be the most artistically designed bank notes printed by the United States.
1899	$1; $2; $5	Large-size silver certificates from the Series of 1899 forward have a blue Treasury seal and serial numbers.
1908	$10	
1923	$1; $5	

==== Complete typeset ====
Complete typeset of large-size United States silver certificates (1878–1923)
Value	Series	Fr. (Note: "Fr" numbers refer to the numbering system in the widely used Friedberg reference book. Fr. numbers indicate varieties existing within a larger type design.)	Image	Portrait	Signature & seal varieties (Note: Varieties are presented by Fr. number followed by the specific differences in signature combination, seal (color, size, and style), and minor design changes, if applicable. For Series 1878 notes, an asterisk following the Assistant Treasurer's name indicates it is hand-signed versus engraved.)
$1	1886	Fr.217	alt=$1 Silver Certificate, Series 1886, Fr.215, depicting Martha Washington	Martha Washington	215 – Rosecrans and Jordan – small red, plain; 216 – Rosecrans and Hyatt – small red, plain; 217 – Rosecrans and Hyatt – large red; 218 – Rosecrans and Huston – large red; 219 – Rosecrans and Huston – large brown; 220 – Rosecrans and Nebecker – large brown; 221 – Rosecrans and Nebecker – small red, scalloped
$1	1891	Fr.223	$1 Silver Certificate, Series 1891, Fr.223, depicting Martha Washington	Martha Washington	222 – Rosecrans and Nebecker – small red, scalloped; 223 – Tillman and Morgan – small red, scalloped
$1	1896	Fr.224	$1 Silver Certificate, Series 1896, Fr.224, depicting allegory entitled "History Instructing Youth"	Allegory History Instructing Youth (obv); George Washington & Martha Washington (rev)	224 – Tillman and Morgan – small red, rays; 225 – Bruce and Roberts – small red, rays
$1	1899	Fr.226	$1 Silver Certificate, Series 1899, Fr.226, depicting Abraham Lincoln and Ulysses Grant	Abraham Lincoln & Ulysses Grant	226 – Lyons and Roberts – blue; 227 – Lyons and Treat – blue; 228 – Vernon and Treat – blue; 229 – Vernon and McClung – blue; 230 – Napier and McClung – blue; 231 – Napier and Thompson – blue; 232 – Parker and Burke – blue; 233 – Teehee and Burke – blue; 234 – Elliott and Burke – blue; 235 – Elliott and White – blue; 236 – Speelman and White – blue
$1	1923	Fr.239	$1 Silver Certificate, Series 1923, Fr.239, depicting George Washington	George Washington	237 – Speelman and White – blue; 238 – Woods and White – blue; 239 – Woods and Tate – blue
$2	1886	Fr.242	$2 Silver Certificate, Series 1886, Fr.242, depicting Winfield Scott Hancock	Winfield Scott Hancock	240 – Rosecrans and Jordan – small red; 241 – Rosecrans and Hyatt – small red; 242 – Rosecrans and Hyatt – large red; 243 – Rosecrans and Huston – large red; 244 – Rosecrans and Huston – large brown
$2	1891	Fr.246	$2 Silver Certificate, Series 1891, Fr.246, depicting William Windom	William Windom	245 – Rosecrans and Nebecker – small red; 246 – Tillman and Morgan – small red
$2	1896	Fr.247	$2 Silver Certificate, Series 1896, Fr.1896, depicting allegory entitled "Science Presenting Steam and Electricity to Commerce and Manufacture"	Allegory of Science Presenting Steam and Electricity to Commerce and Manufacture (obv); Robert Fulton & Samuel F.B. Morse (rev)	247 – Tillman and Morgan – small red; 248 – Bruce and Roberts – small red
$2	1899	Fr.249	$2 Silver Certificate, Series 1899, Fr.249, depicting George Washington	George Washington	249 – Lyons and Roberts – blue; 250 – Lyons and Treat – blue; 251 – Vernon and Treat – blue; 252 – Vernon and McClung – blue; 253 – Napier and McClung – blue; 254 – Napier and Thompson – blue; 255 – Parker and Burke – blue; 256 – Teehee and Burke – blue; 257 – Elliott and Burke – blue; 258 – Speelman and White – blue
$5	1886	Fr.264	$5 Silver Certificate, Series 1886, Fr.264, depicting Ulysses Grant	Ulysses Grant	259 – Rosecrans and Jordan – small red, plain; 260 – Rosecrans and Hyatt – small red, plain; 261 – Rosecrans and Hyatt – large red; 262 – Rosecrans and Huston – large red; 263 – Rosecrans and Huston – large brown; 264 – Rosecrans and Nebecker – large brown; 265 – Rosecrans and Nebecker – small red, scalloped
$5	1891	Fr.267	$5 Silver Certificate, Series 1891, Fr.267, depicting Ulysses Grant	Ulysses Grant	266 – Rosecrans and Nebecker – small red, scalloped; 267 – Tillman and Morgan – small red
$5	1896	Fr.270	$5 Silver Certificate, Series 1896, Fr.270, depicting allegory entitled "Electricity Presenting Light to the World"	Allegory of Electricity Presenting Light to the World (obv); Ulysses Grant & Philip Sheridan (rev)	268 – Tillman and Morgan – small red; 269 – Bruce and Roberts – small red; 270 – Lyons and Roberts – small red
$5	1899	Fr.271	$5 Silver Certificate, Series 1899, Fr.271, depicting Running Antelope	Running Antelope	271 – Lyons and Roberts – blue; 272 – Lyons and Treat – blue; 273 – Vernon and Treat – blue; 274 – Vernon and McClung – blue; 275 – Napier and McClung – blue; 276 – Napier and Thompson – blue; 277 – Parker and Burke – blue; 278 – Teehee and Burke – blue; 279 – Elliott and Burke – blue; 280 – Elliott and White – blue; 281 – Speelman and White – blue
$5	1923	Fr.282	$5 Silver Certificate, Series 1923, Fr.282, depicting Abraham Lincoln	Abraham Lincoln	282 – Speelman and White – blue
$10	1878	Fr.285a*	$10 Silver Certificate, Series 1878, Fr.285a, depicting Robert Morris	Robert Morris	283 – Scofield and Gilfillan, CS by W.G. White – large red; 284 – Scofield and Gilfillan, CS by J.C. Hopper – large red; 284a – Scofield and Gilfillan, CS by T. Hillhouse* – large red; 284b – Scofield and Gilfillan, CS by T. Hillhouse – large red; 284c – Scofield and Gilfillan, CS by R.M. Anthony* – large red; 285 – Scofield and Gilfillan, CS by A.U. Wyman* – large red; 285a – Scofield and Gilfillan, CS by A.U. Wyman – large red
$10	1880	Fr.287	$10 Silver Certificate, Series 1880, Fr.287, depicting Robert Morris	Robert Morris	286 – Scofield and Gilfillan, CS by T. Hillhouse – large brown with X; 286a – Scofield and Gilfillan, CS by A.U. Wyman – large brown with X; 287 – Scofield and Gilfillan – large brown with X; 288 – Bruce and Gilfillan – large brown with X; 289 – Bruce and Wyman – large brown with X; 290 – Bruce and Wyman – large red without X
$10	1886	Fr.291	$10 Silver Certificate, Series 1886, Fr.291, depicting Thomas Hendricks	Thomas Hendricks	291 – Rosecrans and Jordan – small red, plain; 292 – Rosecrans and Hyatt – small red, plain; 293 – Rosecrans and Hyatt – large red; 294 – Rosecrans and Huston – large red; 295 – Rosecrans and Huston – large brown; 296 – Rosecrans and Nebecker – large brown; 297 – Rosecrans and Nebecker – small red, scalloped
$10	1891	Fr.298	$10 Silver Certificate, Series 1891, Fr.298, depicting Thomas Hendricks	Thomas Hendricks	298 – Rosecrans and Nebecker – small red; 299 – Tillman and Morgan – small red; 300 – Bruce and Roberts – small red; 301 – Lyons and Roberts – small red
$10	1908	Fr.302	$10 Silver Certificate, Series 1908, Fr.302, depicting Thomas Hendricks	Thomas Hendricks	302 – Vernon and Treat – blue; 303 – Vernon and McClung – blue; 304 – Parker and Burke – blue
$20	1878	Fr.307	$20 Silver Certificate, Series 1878, Fr.307, depicting Stephen Decatur	Stephen Decatur	305 – Scofield and Gilfillan, CS by J.C. Hopper – large red; 306 – Scofield and Gilfillan, CS by T. Hillhouse – large red; 306a – Scofield and Gilfillan, CS by R.M. Anthony – large red; 306b – Scofield and Gilfillan, CS by A.U. Wyman* – large red; 307 – Scofield and Gilfillan, CS by A.U. Wyman – large red
$20	1880	Fr.311	$20 Silver Certificate, Series 1880, Fr.311, depicting Stephen Decatur	Stephen Decatur	308 – Scofield and Gilfillan, CS by T. Hillhouse – large brown; 309 – Scofield and Gilfillan – large brown; 310 – Bruce and Gilfillan – large brown; 311 – Bruce and Wyman – large brown; 312 – Bruce and Wyman – small red
$20	1886	Fr.316	$20 Silver Certificate, Series 1886, Fr.316, depicting Daniel Manning	Daniel Manning	313 – Rosecrans and Hyatt – large red; 314 – Rosecrans and Huston – large brown; 315 – Rosecrans and Nebecker – large brown; 316 – Rosecrans and Nebecker – small red
$20	1891	Fr.317	$20 Silver Certificate, Series 1891, Fr.317, depicting Daniel Manning	Daniel Manning	317 – Rosecrans and Nebecker – small red; 318 – Tillman and Morgan – small red; 319 – Bruce and Roberts – small red; 320 – Lyons and Roberts – small red; 321 – Parker and Burke – blue; 322 – Teehee and Burke – blue
$50	1878	Fr.324	$50 Silver Certificate, Series 1878, Fr.324, depicting Edward Everett	Edward Everett	323 – Scofield and Gilfillan, CS by W.C. White* or J.C. Hopper* – large red; 324 – Scofield and Gilfillan, CS by T. Hillhouse – large red; 324a – Scofield and Gilfillan, CS by R.M. Anthony – large red; 324b – Scofield and Gilfillan, CS by A.U. Wyman* – large red; 324c – Scofield and Gilfillan, CS by A.U. Wyman – large red
$50	1880	Fr.327	$50 Silver Certificate, Series 1880, Fr.327, depicting Edward Everett	Edward Everett	325 – Scofield and Gilfillan – large brown, rays; 326 – Bruce and Gilfillan – large brown, rays; 327 – Bruce and Wyman – large brown, rays; 328 – Rosecrans and Huston – large brown, spikes; 329 – Rosecrans and Nebecker – small red
$50	1891	Fr.331	$50 Silver Certificate, Series 1891, Fr.331, depicting Edward Everett	Edward Everett	330 – Rosecrans and Nebecker – small red; 331 – Tillman and Morgan – small red; 332 – Bruce and Roberts – small red; 333 – Lyons and Roberts – small red; 334 – Vernon and Treat – small red; 335 – Parker and Burke – blue
$100	1878	Fr.337b	$100 Silver Certificate, Series 1878, Fr.337b, depicting James Monroe	James Monroe	336 – Scofield and Gilfillan, CS by W.G. White – large red; 336a – Scofield and Gilfillan, CS by J.C. Hopper or T. Hillhouse – large red; 337 – Scofield and Gilfillan, CS by R.M. Anthony* – large red; 337a – Scofield and Gilfillan, CS by A.U. Wyman* – large red; 337b – Scofield and Gilfillan, CS by A.U. Wyman – large red
$100	1880	Fr.340	$100 Silver Certificate, Series 1880, Fr.340, depicting James Monroe	James Monroe	338 – Scofield and Gilfillan – large brown, rays; 339 – Bruce and Gilfillan – large brown, rays; 340 – Bruce and Wyman – large brown, rays; 341 – Rosecrans and Huston – large brown, spikes; 342 – Rosecrans and Nebecker – small red
$100	1891	Fr.344	$100 Silver Certificate, Series 1891, Fr.344, depicting James Monroe	James Monroe	343 – Rosecrans and Nebecker – small red; 344 – Tillman and Morgan – small red
$500	1878	Fr.345a	$500 Silver Certificate, Series 1878, Fr.345a, depicting Charles Sumner	Charles Sumner	345a – Scofield and Gilfillan, CS by A.U. Wyman* – large red, rays
$500	1880	Fr.345c	$500 Silver Certificate, Series 1880, Fr.345c, depicting Charles Sumner	Charles Sumner	345b – Scofield and Gilfillan – large brown; 345c – Bruce and Gilfillan – large brown; 345d – Bruce and Wyman – large brown
$1,000	1878	Fr.346a	$1000 Silver Certificate, Series 1878, Fr.346a, depicting William Marcy	William Marcy	346a – Scofield and Gilfillan, CS unknown – large red, rays
$1,000	1880	Fr.346d	$1000 Silver Certificate, Series 1880, Fr.346d, depicting William Marcy	William Marcy	346b – Scofield and Gilfillan – large brown; 346c – Bruce and Gilfillan – large brown; 346d – Bruce and Wyman – large brown
$1,000	1891	Fr.346e	$1000 Silver Certificate, Series 1891, Fr.346e, depicting William Marcy	William Marcy	346e – Tillman and Morgan – small red

=== Small-size United States silver certificates (1928–1957) ===
Complete typeset of small-size United States silver certificates (1928–1957)
Value	Series	Fr. (Note: Because small-size silver certificates are presented in ascending Friedberg number, World War II emergency issue notes (2300, 2306, 2307, and 2309) are presented out of chronological order at the end of the table.)	Image	Portrait	Signature & seal varieties
$1	1928 to 1928-E	Fr.1600	$1 Silver Certificate, Series 1928, Fr.1600, depicting George Washington	George Washington	1600 – Tate and Mellon (1928) – blue | 1601 – Woods and Mellon (1928A) – blue (Note: Serial blocks of the 1928A and 1928B silver certificates that were lettered XB or YB were made of experimental paper, and ZB of regular paper as a control.) | 1602 – Woods and Mills (1928B) – blue | 1603 – Woods and Woodin (1928C) – blue | 1604 – Julian and Woodin (1928D) – blue | 1605 – Julian and Morgenthau (1928E) – blue
$1	1934	Fr.1606	$1 Silver Certificate, Series 1934, Fr.1606, depicting George Washington	George Washington	1606 – Julian and Morgenthau (1934) – blue
$1	1935 to 1935-G	Fr.1607	$1 Silver Certificate, Series 1935, Fr.1607, depicting George Washington	George Washington	1607 – Julian and Morgenthau (1935) – blue | 1608 – Julian and Morgenthau (1935A)– blue | 1609 – Julian and Morgenthau (1935A) R-Exp – blue. (Note: Series 1935A "Experimental" bills were stamped with either a red "R" or "S" while testing regular and synthetic papers.) | 1610 – Julian and Morgenthau (1935A) S-Exp – blue | 1611 – Julian and Vinson (1935B) – blue | 1612 – Julian and Snyder (1935C) – blue | 1613W – Clark and Snyder (1935D) Wide – blue (Note: For 1935D, narrow and wide refer to the width of design features on the reverse of the note. The wide variety is 0.0625 in (1.5875 mm) larger and has a four-digit reverse plate number less than 5016.) | 1613N – Clark and Snyder (1935D) Narrow – blue | 1614 – Priest and Humphrey (1935E) – blue | 1615 – Priest and Anderson (1935F) – blue | 1616 – Smith and Dillon (1935G) – blue
$1	1935-G to 1957-B	Fr.1619	$1 Silver Certificate, Series 1957, Fr.1619, depicting George Washington	George Washington	1617 – Smith and Dillon (1935G) – blue (Note: The motto ("In God We Trust") was added to the Series of 1935G notes midway through the issue.) | 1618 – Granahan and Dillon (1935H) – blue | 1619 – Priest and Anderson (1957) – blue | 1620 – Smith and Dillon (1957A) – blue | 1621 – Granahan and Dillon (1957B) – blue
$5	1934 to 1934-D	Fr.1650	$5 Silver Certificate, Series 1934, Fr.1650, depicting Abraham Lincoln	Abraham Lincoln	1650 – Julian and Morgenthau (1934) – blue | 1651 – Julian and Morgenthau (1934A) – blue | 1652 – Julian and Vinson (1934B) – blue | 1653 – Julian and Snyder (1934C) – blue | 1654 – Clark and Snyder (1934D) – blue
$5	1953 to 1953-C	Fr.1655	$5 Silver Certificate, Series 1953, Fr.1655, depicting Abraham Lincoln	Abraham Lincoln	1655 – Priest and Humphrey (1953) – blue | 1656 – Priest and Anderson (1953A) – blue | 1657 – Smith and Dillon (1953B) – blue | 1658 – Granahan and Dillon (1953C) – blue (Note: Printed but not issued.)
$10	1933 to 1933-A	Fr.1700	$10 Silver Certificate, Series 1933, Fr.1700, depicting Alexander Hamilton	Alexander Hamilton	1700 – Julian and Woodin (1933) – blue (Note: Very few Series 1933 $10 Silver Certificates were released before they were replaced by Series 1934 and most of those remaining were consigned to destruction; only a few dozen are known to collectors today.) 1700a – Julian and Morgenthau (1933A) – blue
$10	1934 to 1934-D	Fr.1701	$10 Silver Certificate, Series 1934, Fr.1701, depicting Alexander Hamilton	Alexander Hamilton	1701 – Julian and Morgenthau (1934) – blue | 1702 – Julian and Morgenthau (1934A) – blue | 1703 – Julian and Vinson (1934B) – blue | 1704 – Julian and Snyder (1934C) – blue | 1705 – Clark and Snyder (1934D) – blue
$10	1953 to 1953-B	Fr.1706	$10 Silver Certificate, Series 1953, Fr.1706, depicting Alexander Hamilton	Alexander Hamilton	1706 – Priest and Humphrey (1953) – blue | 1707 – Priest and Anderson (1953A) – blue | 1708 – Smith and Dillon (1953B) – blue
$1	1935-A	Fr.2300	$1 Silver Certificate, Series 1935A, Fr.2300, depicting George Washington	George Washington	2300 – Julian and Morgenthau – brown
$1	1935-A	Fr.2306	$1 Silver Certificate, Series 1935A, Fr.2306, depicting George Washington	George Washington	2306 – Julian and Morgenthau (1935A) – yellow
$5	1934-A	Fr.2307	$5 Silver Certificate, Series 1934A, Fr.2307, depicting Abraham Lincoln	Abraham Lincoln	2307 – Julian and Morgenthau (1934A) – yellow
$10	1934 to 1934-A	Fr.2309	$10 Silver Certificate, Series 1934A, Fr.2309, depicting Alexander Hamilton	Alexander Hamilton	2308 – Julian and Morgenthau (1934) – yellow | 2309 – Julian and Morgenthau (1934A) – yellow

== See also ==
- Silver certificate
- Gold certificate (United States)
- Silver as an investment
- Silver certificate (Cuba)
- Silver standard

== General and cited references ==
- Agger, Eugene E. (1918). "The Denominations of the Currency". The Quarterly Journal of Economics. 32 (2): 257–277. doi:10.2307/1885428. JSTOR 1885428.
- Ascher, Leonard W. (1964). "The Coming Chaos in Our Coinage". Financial Analysts Journal. 20 (3): 99–102. doi:10.2469/faj.v20.n3.99. JSTOR 4469657.
- Barnett, Paul (1964). "The Crime of 1873 Re-examined". Agricultural History. 38 (3): 178–181. JSTOR 3740438.
- Blake, George Herbert (1908). United States paper money. George H. Blake. p. 32.
- Carothers, Neil (1932). "A Senate Racket". The North American Review. 233 (1): 4–15. JSTOR 25113955.
- Cuhaj, George S. (2012). Standard Catalog of United States Paper Money. Krause Publications. ISBN 978-1-4402-3087-5.
- Dillon, C. Douglas (1963). Annual Report of the Secretary of the Treasury on the State of the Finances (Report). United States Government Printing Office. pp. 400–403.
- Friedberg, Arthur L.; Friedberg, Ira S. (2013). Paper Money of the United States: A Complete Illustrated Guide With Valuations (20th ed.). Coin & Currency Institute. ISBN 978-0-87184-520-7.
- Friedman, Milton (1990). "The Crime of 1873". Journal of Political Economy. 98 (6): 1159–1194. doi:10.1086/261730. JSTOR 2937754. S2CID 153940661.
- Grey, George B. (2002). Federal Reserve System: Background, Analyses and Bibliography. Nova Science Publishers, Inc. ISBN 978-1-59033-053-1.
- Knox, John Jay (1888). United States Notes: A history of the various issues of paper money by the government of the United States (3rd ed.). Charles Scribner's Sons.
- Leavens, Dickson H. (1939). Silver Money (PDF). Principia Press, Inc.
- Lee, Alfred E. (1886). "Bimetalism in the United States". Political Science Quarterly. 1 (3): 386–399. doi:10.2307/2139359. JSTOR 2139359.
- McVey, Frank L. (1902). "The Reclassification of the Paper Currency". Journal of Political Economy. 10 (3): 437–442. doi:10.1086/250857. JSTOR 1819565.
- O'Leary, Paul M. (1960). "The Scene of the Crime of 1873 Revisited: A Note". Journal of Political Economy. 68 (4): 388–392. doi:10.1086/258345. JSTOR 1830011. S2CID 153797690.
- Schwartz, John; Lindquist, Scott (2011). Standard Guide to Small-Size U.S. Paper Money – 1928 to Date. Krause Publications. ISBN 978-1-4402-1703-6.
- Taussig, F. W. (1890). "The Silver Situation in the United States". The Quarterly Journal of Economics. 4 (3): 291–315. doi:10.2307/1881888. hdl:2027/uc1.$b245353. JSTOR 1881888.
- Taussig, F. W. (1892). "The Silver Situation in the United States". Publication of the American Economic Association. 7 (1): 7–118. JSTOR 2485709.
