= Teehee =

Teehee or Tee Hee may refer to:

- Houston B. Teehee (1874–1953), Cherokee attorney and politician
- Kimberly Teehee (born 1968), Cherokee attorney and politician
- T. Hee (1911–1988), animator
- Tee Hee Johnson, James Bond villain played by Julius Harris in Live and Let Die
- TeeHee, phrase and former app associated with YouTube personality Ryan Higa
