= Asa B. Carey =

U.S. Army brigadier general

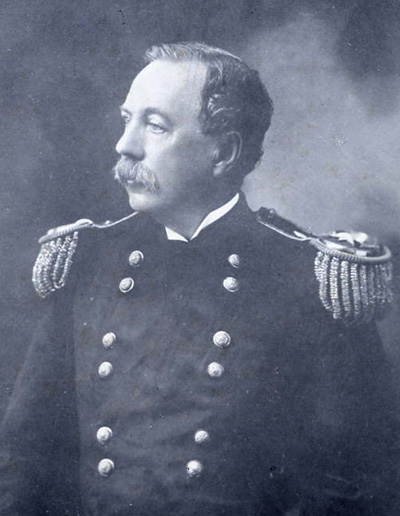
- From 1901's Companions of the Military Order of the Loyal Legion of the United States
- Born: July 12, 1835; Canterbury, Connecticut, U.S.
- Died: April 4, 1912 (aged 76); Orlando, Florida, U.S.
- Burial place: Oak Grove Cemetery, Tisbury, Massachusetts, U.S.
- Education: United States Military Academy
- Spouse: Laura Melinda Colby (m. 1867–1912)
- Children: 2
- Relatives: Stoddard B. Colby (father in law); Meriwether Lewis Walker (son in law)
- Military career
- Allegiance: Union; United States
- Service: Union Army; United States Army
- Service years: 1854–1861 (U.S. Army); 1861–1865 (Union Army); 1865–1899 (U.S. Army)
- Rank: Brigadier General
- Unit: U.S. Army Paymaster Department
- Commands: Chief Paymaster: District of New Mexico; Department of California; Department of the East; Department of Dakota; Department of the Lakes; Paymaster-General of the United States Army
- Wars: American Civil War; American Indian Wars: Navajo Wars; Spanish–American War

Asa Bacon Carey (July 12, 1835 – April 4, 1912) was a career officer in the United States Army. A veteran of the American Civil War, American Indian Wars, and Spanish–American War, he served from 1854 to 1899 and attained the rank of brigadier general as Paymaster-General of the United States Army.

A native of Canterbury, Connecticut, Carey worked as a farm laborer as a teenager, then began attendance at the United States Military Academy. He graduated in 1858 and began his career in the Western United States, including postings to Utah Territory and New Mexico Territory. He took part in the Utah War in 1859 and 1860, and in the final battles of the Navajo Wars in 1860 and 1861.

During the American Civil War, Carey served in the Union Army and performed recruiting, mustering, commissary, and paymaster duties, primarily in New Mexico. After the war, he joined the Paymaster Department, and his subsequent assignments included chief paymaster of army departments throughout the United States. In January 1899, he was promoted to brigadier general and appointed as the army's paymaster-general. In March 1899, he personally transported $3,000,000 to Cuba to be used in paying the salaries of Spanish–American War soldiers during the United States Military Government in Cuba.

Carey left the army upon reaching the mandatory retirement age of 64 in July 1899. In retirement, he was a resident of Tisbury, Massachusetts and Orlando, Florida. He died in Orlando on April 4, 1912. Carey was buried at Oak Grove Cemetery in Tisbury.

== Early life ==
Asa B. Carey was born in Canterbury, Connecticut on July 12, 1835, a son of James Benajah Carey and Mary Bacon (Adams) Carey. He was raised and educated in Windham County, Connecticut; according to the 1850 U.S. Census, he worked as a laborer on the Windham, Connecticut farm owned his grand-aunt Abigail (Bacon) Paine and her husband Walter Paine.

In 1854, Carey received an appointment to the United States Military Academy at West Point. He graduated in 1858 ranked 20th of 27. Carey was appointed a second lieutenant of Infantry and assigned to the garrison at Fort Columbus, New York. In October 1858 he was assigned to the 7th Infantry Regiment.

== Start of career ==
After joining the 7th Infantry, Carey took part in the 1859–1860 Utah War. In 1860 and 1861, he was posted to New Mexico Territory, where he took part in some of the last battles of the Navajo Wars. He was promoted to first lieutenant in May 1861 and captain in October 1861. During the American Civil War, Carey served in the Union Army, and from May 1861 to June 1863, he performed frontier duty with the 7th Infantry while based at Fort Union, New Mexico.

Carey served as chief quartermaster of an expedition against the Navajo from July 1863 to June 1864. From June 1864 to July 1865 he was acting chief quartermaster and acting commissary of musters for the Department of New Mexico. Carey served as recruiting officer for United States Volunteers, chief mustering officer, chief disbursing officer, and commissary of musters for the District of New Mexico from August 1865 to August 1866. During the war, Carey received brevet promotions to major (March 1862) and lieutenant colonel (March 1865), both for heroism and meritorious service during campaigns against the Navajo.

== Continued career ==
After an extended post-war leave of absence, Carey served as chief commissary of the Department of Dakota from August to October 1867. He then transferred to the Paymaster Department and was promoted to major, and he served as paymaster of the District of St. Louis, Missouri from November 1867 to March 1868. From April 1868 to April 1869 he was paymaster of the District of Santa Fe, New Mexico. Carey was assigned as chief paymaster of the District of New Mexico from May to July 1870, and he continued to perform paymaster duties in New Mexico after the appointment of a new chief paymaster.

Carey was assigned to the staff in the office of the army's Paymaster-General from July 1874 to October 1885. From October 1885 to April 1887 he was assigned to the Presidio of San Francisco on the staff of the chief paymaster for the Department of California. He served as the department's chief paymaster from May to June 1890. From June 1889 to January 1893, Carey performed paymaster duties for districts based in New York City and Boston.

== Later career ==
In January 1893, Carey was posted to New York City as chief paymaster for the Department of the East. He served in this position until April 1897, and was promoted to lieutenant colonel in March 1895. From April 1897 to December 1898, he was chief paymaster of the Department of Dakota and the Department of the Lakes, based in Saint Paul, Minnesota. In June 1898, he was promoted to colonel. From December 1898 to January 1899, he was Chief Paymaster of the Department of the Lakes, based in Chicago.

Carey was appointed the army's Paymaster-General on January 11, 1899, succeeding Thaddeus H. Stanton, and he was promoted to brigadier general on January 30. As Paymaster-General, Carey took personal responsibility for transporting from New York City to Cuba $3,000,000 in cash that was intended for use in paying U.S. troops performing Spanish–American War duty during the United States Military Government in Cuba. Carey reached the mandatory retirement age of 64 in July 1899 and was succeeded by Alfred E. Bates.

== Retirement and death ==
In retirement, Carey was a summer resident of Tisbury, Massachusetts, and spent winters in Orlando, Florida. He died in Orlando on April 4, 1912. Carey was buried at Oak Grove Cemetery in Tisbury.

== Family ==
In 1867, Carey married Laura Melinda Colby, the daughter of attorney and federal government official Stoddard B. Colby, and the niece of prominent businessman and politician Redfield Proctor. They were the parents of two children, son Edward Colby Carey, and daughter Edith Colby Carey. Colonel Edward Carey was a career soldier who married Ruth Palmer, the daughter of Medal of Honor recipient George Henry Palmer and sister of Brigadier General Bruce Palmer.

Edith Colby Carey was the wife of Brigadier General Meriwether Lewis Walker. Their daughter, Cary Walker, was the wife of Marine Corps Lieutenant General Robert B. Luckey.
