= Frank Moore Colby =

American educator and writer (1865–1925)

- Born: February 10, 1865; Washington, D.C., U.S.
- Died: March 3, 1925 (aged 60); New York City, U.S.
- Scientific career
- Workplaces: Amherst College; Columbia University; New York University

Frank Moore Colby (February 10, 1865 – March 3, 1925) was an American educator and writer.

== Biography ==
Colby was born in Washington, D. C., the son of Stoddard B. Colby and Ellen Cornelia (Hunt) Colby. He graduated from Columbia University in 1888, was acting professor of history at Amherst College in 1890 and 1891, lecturer on history at Columbia and instructor in history and economics at Barnard College from 1891 to 1895, and professor of economics at New York University until 1900.

Between 1893 and 1895 he was a member of the editorial staff of Johnson's Universal Cyclopaedia in the department of history and political science, and in 1898 he joined the New International Encyclopedia (called International Cyclopedia when he started) as an editor. He went on to publish its first edition in 1902, then the second in 1914 with Talcott Williams. From 1898 until his death in 1925, he edited the International Year Book.

His other literary work comprises editorial writing for the New York Commercial Advertiser 1900–1902, "The Book of the Month" in the North American Review (1913– ), as well as critical articles for the Bookman and other magazines. He wrote:

- Outlines of General History (1900),
- Imaginary Obligations (1904), and
- Constrained Attitudes (1910).

Colby was described as "an essayist who wrote so well and so provocatively that every lover of American letters is aware of him," and his writing appears in an anthology called "Reading I Like" by prominent humorist Clifton Fadiman.

After his death, Clarence Day edited a two-volume collection of Colby's best work, The Colby Essays, containing various "Colbyisms" that became well known and quoted. Among them are "Nobody can describe a fool to the life, without much patient self-inspection." and "Men will confess to treason, murder, arson, false teeth, or a wig. How many of them will own up to a lack of humor."

== Personal life ==
On December 31, 1896, Colby married Harriet Wood Fowler (born 1872), and they had three children, Georgina, Stoddard, and Harriet. Harriet joined Colby in editing International Year Book, Johnson's Encyclopedia, and the New International Encyclopedia.
