= Stoddard B. Colby =

American lawyer and civil servant (1816–1867)

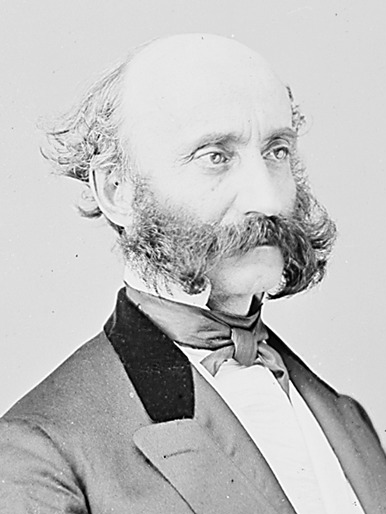
- Colby, c. 1860–1865

2nd Register of the Treasury
- In office August 11, 1864 – September 21, 1867
- President: Abraham Lincoln; Andrew Johnson
- Preceded by: Lucius E. Chittenden
- Succeeded by: Noah L. Jeffries

Member of the Vermont House of Representatives
- In office 1842–1843
- Preceded by: John G. Chandler
- Succeeded by: Abel Wilder
- Constituency: Derby

Personal details
- Born: Stoddard Benham Colby; February 3, 1816 Derby, Vermont, US
- Died: September 21, 1867 (aged 51) Haverhill, New Hampshire, US
- Resting place: Proctor Cemetery, Proctorsville, Vermont, US
- Spouse(s): Harriet Elizabeth Proctor (m. 1840); Ellen Cornelia Hunt (m. 1855)
- Children: 6 (including Frank Moore Colby)
- Education: Dartmouth College
- Occupation: Lawyer

Stoddard Benham Colby (February 3, 1816 – September 21, 1867) was an American lawyer and political figure. He is notable for his service as Register of the United States Treasury during the American Civil War.

== Biography ==
Colby was born in Derby, Vermont on February 3, 1816, the son of Judge Nehemiah Colby and Malinda (Larrabee) Colby. He was educated in Derby, and prepared for college by studying in the office of attorney Timothy P. Redfield. He graduated from Dartmouth College in 1836, and was elected to Phi Beta Kappa. He studied law with William Upham, was admitted to the bar in 1838, and practiced law in Derby. Among the prospective attorneys who studied in Colby's office was John L. Edwards. In 1842 he was elected to the Vermont House of Representatives, and served from 1842 to 1842. In 1846 he began to practice in Montpelier as the partner of Lucius B. Peck.

In 1855, Colby was the unsuccessful Democratic nominee for Lieutenant governor of Vermont. In 1856, he was the unsuccessful Democratic nominee for the United States House of Representatives.

Colby was appointed Register of the Treasury and assumed office on August 12, 1864.

== Family ==
He was married to Harriet Elizabeth Proctor, sister of Redfield Proctor. She was one of the victims of the 1852 Henry Clay (1851 steamboat) disaster. They had four children. In 1855, he married Ellen Cornelia Hunt of Haverhill, New Hampshire. They were the parents of two children.

=== Children ===
With Harriet Elizabeth Proctor:

- Jabez Proctor Colby
- Laura Melinda Colby, the wife of Brigadier General Asa B. Carey
- Edward P. Colby
- Lucien Redfield Colby

With Ellen Cornelia Hunt:

- Ellen Rebecca Colby, the wife of Frederick Abbott Stokes
- Frank Moore Colby, publisher

== Death and burial ==
Colby died in Haverhill following a five-week illness. He was buried at Proctor Cemetery in Proctorsville, Vermont.

== Awards and honors ==
In August 1867, he received the honorary degree of LL.D. from Norwich University.

Party political offices
Preceded by William Mattocks	Democratic nominee for Lieutenant Governor of Vermont; 1855	Succeeded by Wyllys Lyman
