= James Gilfillan =

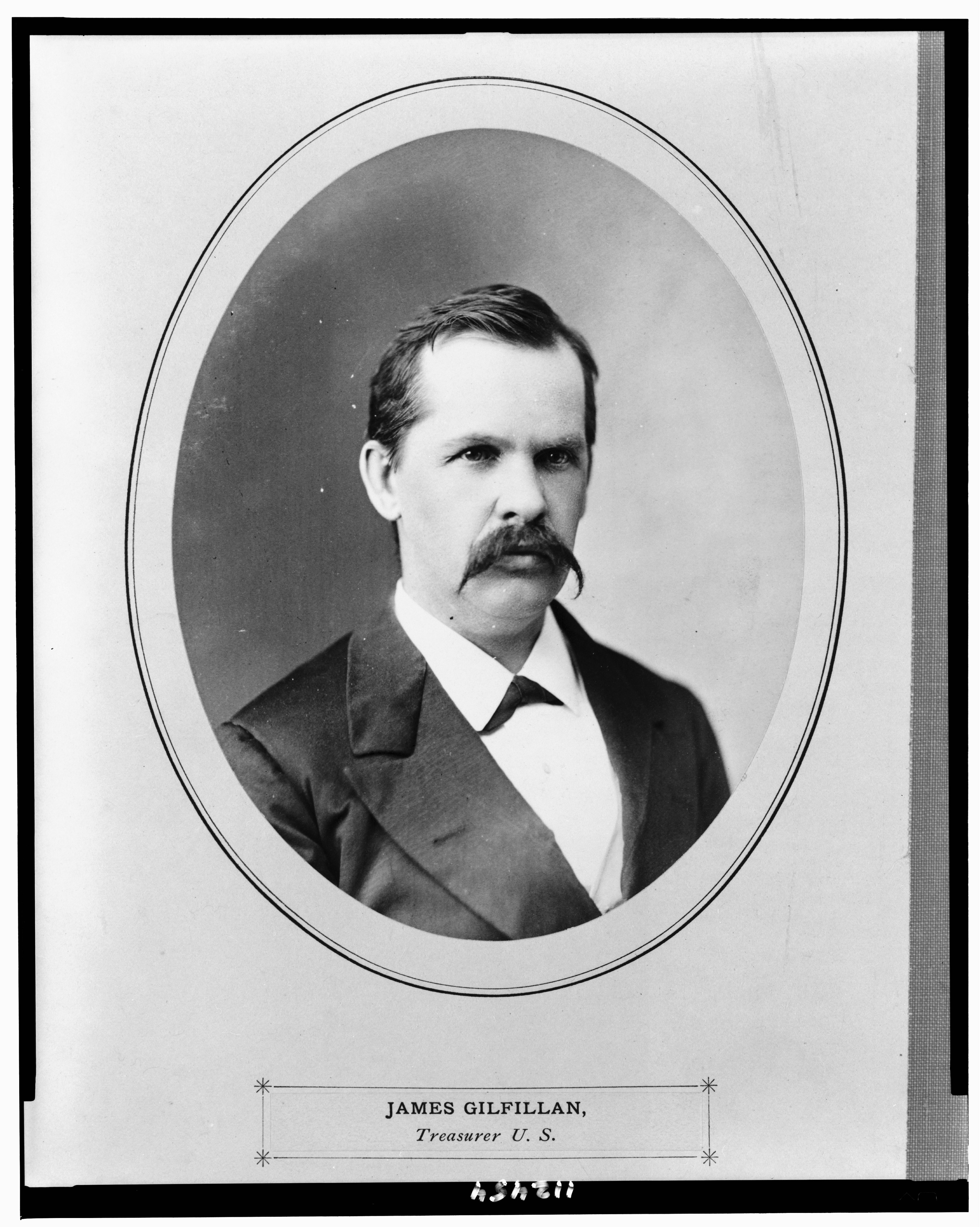

13th Treasurer of the United States
- In office July 1, 1877 – March 31, 1883
- President: Rutherford B. Hayes; James A. Garfield; Chester A. Arthur
- Preceded by: A.U. Wyman
- Succeeded by: A.U. Wyman

Personal details
- Born: April 25, 1836 Belchertown, Massachusetts, U.S.
- Died: April 8, 1929 (aged 92) Colchester, Connecticut, U.S.
- Education: Williams College
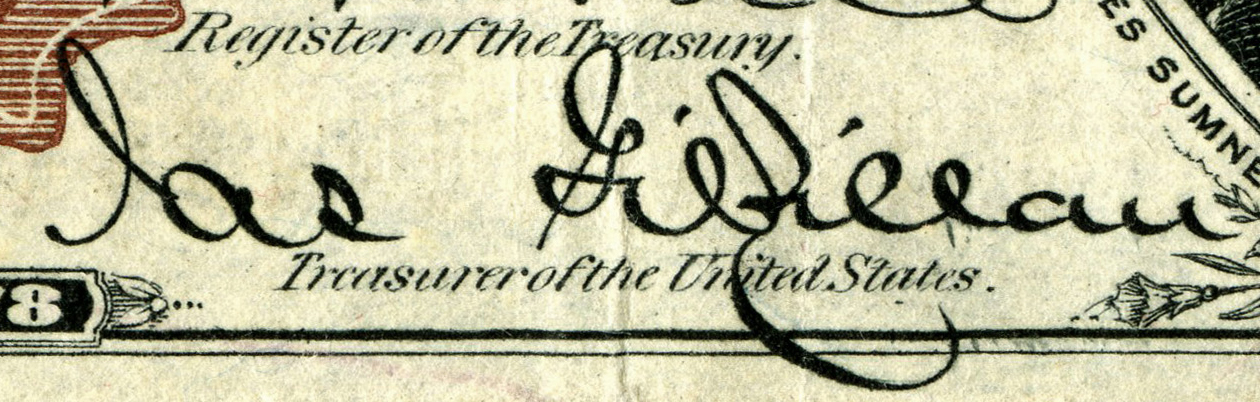
- Signature

James Gilfillan (April 25, 1836 – April 8, 1929) was the 13th Treasurer of the United States.

Gilfillan was a native of Belchertown, Massachusetts, born there to Scottish parents. In 1856 he graduated from Williams College, where he was a classmate of future President James A. Garfield.

After graduation, he worked as a country editor of a weekly newspaper, reading law with the goal of entering the bar at the same time. He abandoned both professions, instead taking a clerkship at the Treasury Department in 1861, at an annual salary of $1,200. He remained a clerk until President Ulysses S. Grant made him cashier of the United States under Treasurer John C. New.

Gilfillan, rising steadily through the ranks, was appointed Treasurer by President Rutherford B. Hayes, and he served from July 1, 1877, to March 31, 1883. During this period he was also Sinking Fund Commissioner for the District of Columbia; he was not paid for his service on the board until a bill of Senator George P. McLean of Connecticut passed Congress, awarding him $4,750.

As Treasurer, Gilfillan acquired a reputation for integrity in his dealings, launching anti-corruption investigations, avoiding politics, and attending to his business.

In his later years, Gilfillan lived in Colchester, Connecticut. In November 1928, he was one of only five persons over the age of 90 to vote in the town. He died at his home there, aged 92, and his funeral took place two days later.

== Bibliography ==
- "James Gilfillan, Garfield Aide, Dies", The New York Times, April 9, 1929, p. 28.

Government offices
Preceded by A.U. Wyman	Treasurer of the United States; 1877 — 1883	Succeeded by A.U. Wyman
