= Charles H. Treat =

American politician

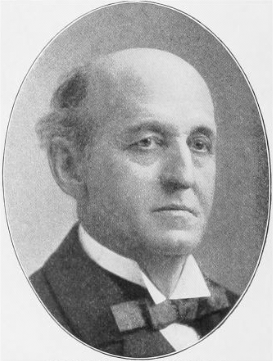

21st Treasurer of the United States
- In office July 1, 1905 – October 30, 1909
- President: Theodore Roosevelt; William Howard Taft
- Preceded by: Ellis H. Roberts
- Succeeded by: Lee McClung

Personal details
- Born: 1842 Frankfort, Maine, U.S.
- Died: May 30, 1910 (aged 68) New York City, New York, U.S.
- Party: Republican
- Spouse: Frances Emily Huxford
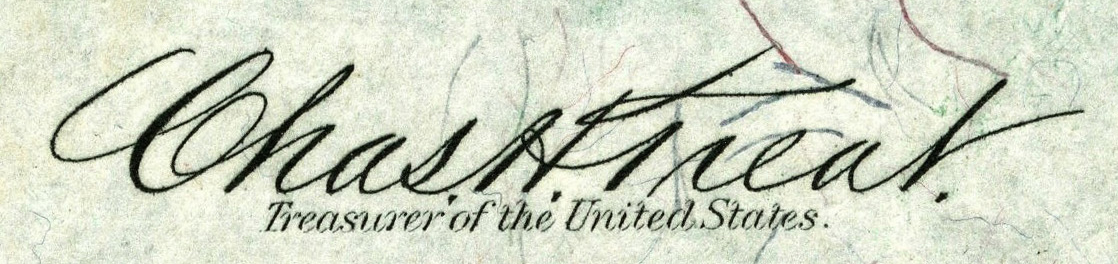
- Signature

Charles Henry Treat (1842 – May 30, 1910) was an American politician who served as the Treasurer of the United States.

== Early life ==
He was born in Frankfort, Maine, the son of Henry Treat and the grandson of Col. Ezra Treat of Maine. He was descended from Robert Treat, who was the royal Governor of Connecticut from 1676-1708. He was educated in country schools, and taught in the Academy of Rockport, Maine to pay for his schooling. He graduated from Dartmouth College in 1863. Thereafter, he entered his father's West Indian shipping business.

== Political career ==
He developed a great talent for public speaking and organization. He spoke in Maine for James G. Blaine. He was the delegate at large from Delaware to the Republican National convention of 1888 in Chicago. He was the Republican candidate for representative of Delaware in Congress in 1888. He moved to New York City and planned the entire campaign which won the east side for the Republican Party in 1893. In 1896 President William McKinley appointed him the collector of Internal Revenue for the Wall Street District, Elihu Root and Cornelius N. Bliss being his sponsors. He was reappointed by President Theodore Roosevelt in 1902. In 1905, Treat was appointed Treasurer of the United States by President Roosevelt, a post that he held until July 1909. He was succeeded by Lee McClung.

== Death ==
He died on Monday, May 30, 1910 from apoplexy at the age of 68 in his apartment in the Hotel Victoria around 11:00 a.m. He was pronounced dead by Dr. Gilday. Funeral services were held June 2, 1910 at 3:00 p.m. at the Grace Church, New York on 802 Broadway near Tenth Street. The services were conducted by Dr. Slattery, rector of the church, who was assisted by the Rev. Charles T. Walkley, rector of the Grace Church, Orange, New Jersey, of which Treat was a communicant for fifteen years. He was a member of the Union League Republicans and West Side Republican Clubs in New York. He was married to Mrs. Frances Emily Huxford and they had two daughters.

Preceded by Ellis H. Roberts	Treasurer of the United States; 1905–1909	Succeeded by Lee McClung
