= A. U. Wyman =

American politician

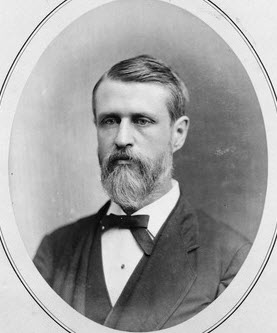

12th and 14th Treasurer of the United States
- In office April 1, 1883 – April 30, 1885
- President: Chester A. Arthur; Grover Cleveland
- Preceded by: James Gilfillan
- Succeeded by: Conrad N. Jordan
- In office July 1, 1876 – June 30, 1877
- President: Ulysses S. Grant; Rutherford B. Hayes
- Preceded by: John C. New
- Succeeded by: James Gilfillan

Personal details
- Born: Albert U. Wyman; 1833
- Died: 1915 (c. aged 82)
- Occupation: banker
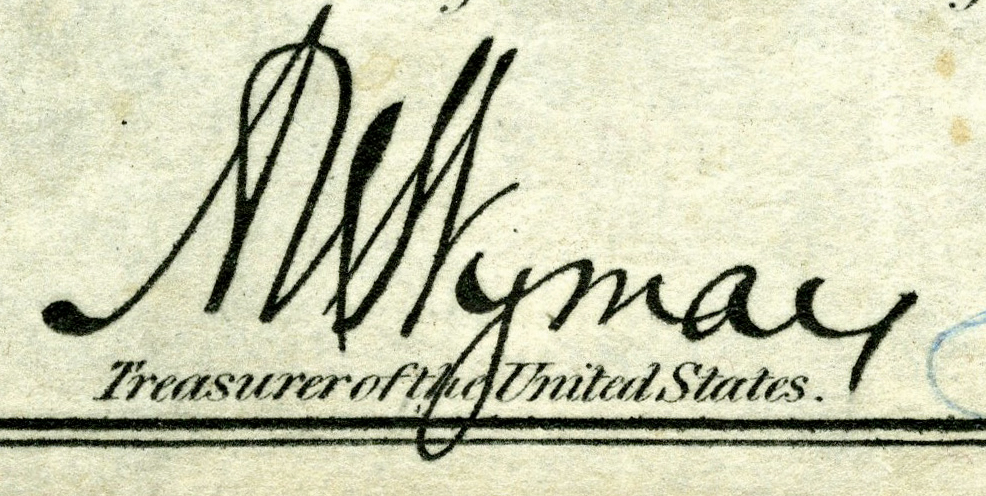
- Signature

Albert U. Wyman (1833–1915) was a United States banker who served as Treasurer of the United States from 1876 to 1877 and then again from 1883 to 1885.

Wyman was raised in Madison, Wisconsin. After completing a common school education, he joined his father's printing office. He later went into banking, working first in Madison and then in Omaha, Nebraska.

In 1863, Wyman became a clerk in the Office of the Treasurer of the United States. He was then appointed assistant cashier, holding that office until resigning on January 1, 1868. He returned to the Office of the Treasurer of the United States on April 1, 1875, becoming assistant treasurer.

On June 28, 1876, President of the United States Ulysses S. Grant nominated Wyman to be Treasurer of the United States, and he was confirmed by the United States Senate the next day. He assumed office on July 8, 1876, and held office until July 1, 1877. He re-joined the Office of the Treasurer of the United States in September 1879 as Cashier. In 1883, President Chester A. Arthur nominated Wyman to be Treasurer of the United States for a second time, and Wyman held that office from April 1, 1883, to April 30, 1885.

Wyman then returned to Omaha to work as a banker for the Omaha Trust Company, eventually becoming its president.

Government offices
Preceded by John C. New	Treasurer of the United States; July 1, 1876 – June 30, 1877	Succeeded by James Gilfillan
Preceded by James Gilfillan	Treasurer of the United States; April 1, 1883 – April 30, 1885	Succeeded by Conrad N. Jordan
