= W. O. Woods =

27th Treasurer of the United States
- In office January 18, 1929 – May 31, 1933
- President: Calvin Coolidge; Herbert Hoover; Franklin D. Roosevelt
- Preceded by: Harold Theodore Tate
- Succeeded by: William Alexander Julian

17th Register of the Treasury
- In office October 1, 1927 – January 17, 1929
- President: Calvin Coolidge
- Preceded by: Harley V. Speelman
- Succeeded by: Edward E. Jones

Personal details
- Born: Walter Orr Woods; October 31, 1873 Concordia, Kansas, U.S.
- Died: June 7, 1951 (aged 77) Carlinville, Illinois, U.S.
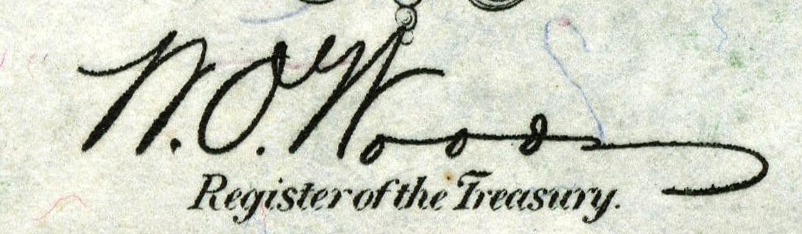
- Signature

Walter Orr Woods (October 31, 1873 – June 7, 1951) was an American government official who was Register of the Treasury from October 1, 1927, to January 17, 1929 and Treasurer of the United States from January 18, 1929, to May 31, 1933. Before becoming Treasurer, he was a member of the War Loan Board staff. As Treasurer he supervised the change from the large to the smaller sized U.S. currency now in use.

Government offices
| Preceded by Harley V. Speelman | Register of the Treasury; October 1, 1927 – January 17, 1929 | Succeeded by Edward E. Jones |
| Preceded by Harold Theodore Tate | Treasurer of the United States; January 18, 1929 – May 31, 1933 | Succeeded by William Alexander Julian |
