= Register of the Treasury =

Former officer of the U.S. Treasury Department

The Register of the Treasury was an officer of the United States Treasury Department. The Register's duties included filing the accounting records of the government, transferring and cancelling federal debt securities, and filing the certificates of U.S.-registered ships.

The signature of the Register of the Treasury was found on almost all United States currency until 1923, along with that of the Treasurer of the United States. Four of the five African Americans whose signatures have appeared on U.S. currency were Registers of the Treasury (Blanche K. Bruce, Judson W. Lyons, William T. Vernon and James C. Napier).

After Woodrow Wilson appointed an African American, Adam E. Patterson, for the position in 1913, Southern senators (including Hoke Smith, James K. Vardaman, and Ben Tillman) expressed their opposition to Patterson on the grounds of his race, also saying that they opposed any African American for an office that would put them above Caucasian women. Patterson quickly withdrew his name, and Wilson appointed Gabe E. Parker, the first non-African American man to hold the position in fifteen years, to the Register of the Treasury, leaving African Americans dismayed.

In 1919, the office of the Register became the Public Debt Service which, in 1940, became the Bureau of the Public Debt, and, in 2012, became the Bureau of the Fiscal Service.

== Registers of the Treasury ==
The Treasury had eighteen Registers between 1861 and 1933.

Image	Name	Dates served
	Lucius E. Chittenden	April 17, 1861 – August 10, 1864
	S. B. Colby	August 11, 1864 – September 21, 1867
	Noah L. Jeffries	October 5, 1867 – March 15, 1869
	John Allison	April 3, 1869 – March 23, 1878
	Glenni William Scofield	April 1, 1878 – May 20, 1881
	Blanche Kelso Bruce	May 21, 1881 – June 5, 1885
	William Starke Rosecrans	June 8, 1885 – June 19, 1893
	James Fount Tillman	July 1, 1893 – December 2, 1897
	Blanche Kelso Bruce	December 3, 1897 – March 17, 1898
	Judson Whitlocke Lyons	April 7, 1898 – April 1, 1906
	William Tecumseh Vernon	June 11, 1906 – March 14, 1911
	James Carroll Napier	March 15, 1911 – September 30, 1913
	Gabe E. Parker	October 1, 1913 – December 31, 1914
	Houston Benge Teehee	March 24, 1915 – November 20, 1919
	William S. Elliott	November 21, 1919 – January 24, 1922
	Harley V. Speelman	January 25, 1922 – September 30, 1927
	Walter Orr Woods	October 1, 1927 – January 17, 1929
	Edward E. Jones	January 22, 1929 – May 31, 1933

== See also ==
- Robert Tyler, Register of the Treasury for the C.S.A. and son of the 10th president, John Tyler.
