= Gabe E. Parker =

American public servant (1878–1953)

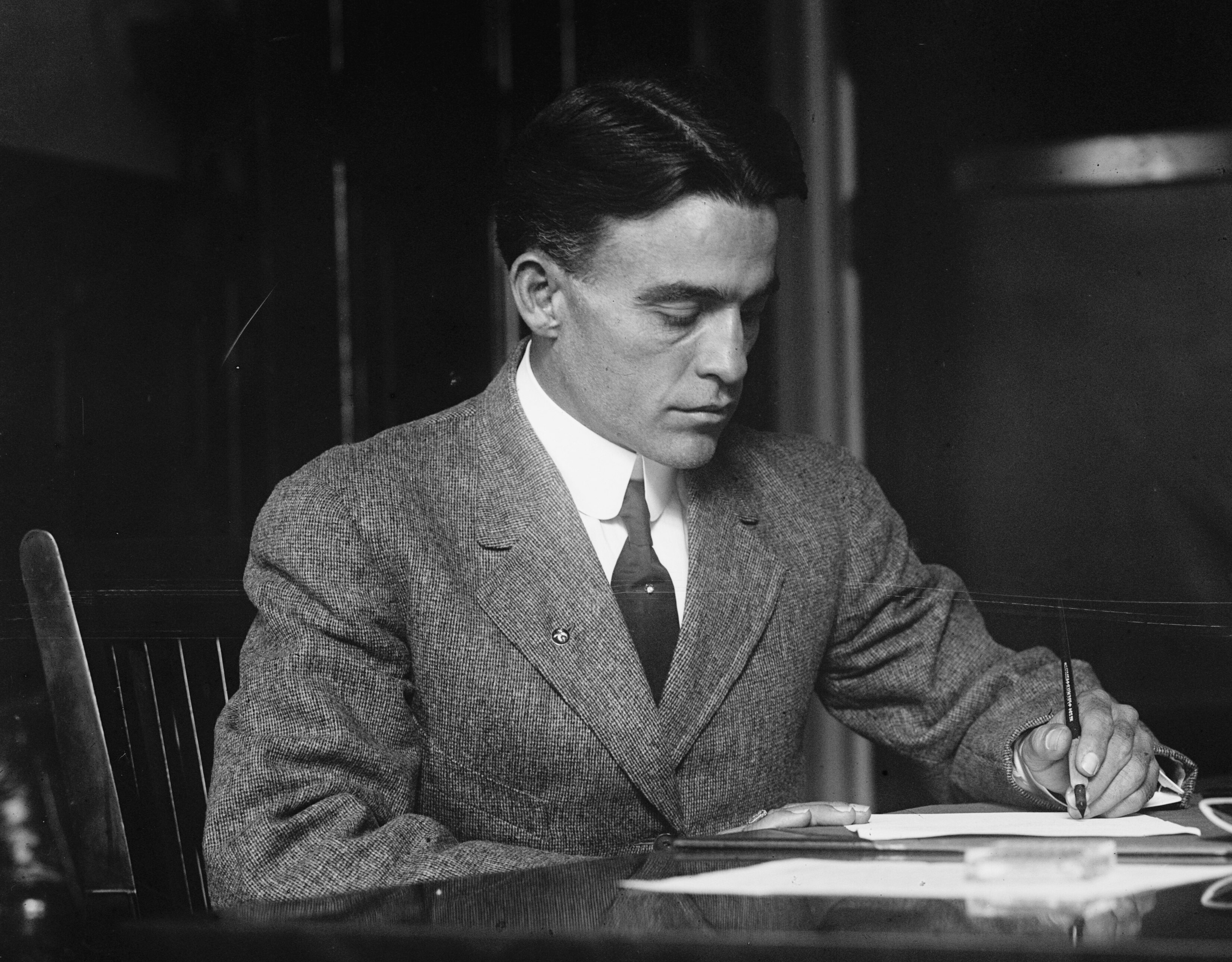
- Parker, 1909–1919

Superintendent of the Five Civilized Tribes
- In office 1915–1921
- President: Woodrow Wilson

13th Register of the Treasury
- In office October 1, 1913 – December 31, 1914
- President: Woodrow Wilson
- Preceded by: James Carroll Napier
- Succeeded by: Houston B. Teehee

Personal details
- Born: Gabriel Edward Parker; September 29, 1878 Fort Towson, Choctaw Nation
- Died: May 8, 1953 (aged 74) Oklahoma City, Oklahoma
- Citizenship: Choctaw Nation; American
- Education: Henry Kendall College
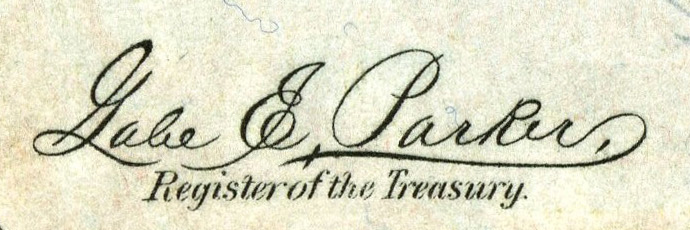
- Signature

Gabriel Edward Parker (September 29, 1878 – May 8, 1953) was an American public servant. Born in the Indian Territory, he attended the 1906 Oklahoma Constitutional Convention and was heavily involved in the design of the state's seal. Parker was later Register of the Treasury (1913-1914) and superintendent of the Five Civilized Tribes (1915-1921).

== Biography ==
Perker was born on September 29, 1878 in Fort Towson, Oklahoma in the Choctaw Nation of Oklahoma. Parker was reported to have been one-eighth Choctaw. The following year he moved to Nelson, Oklahoma. He graduated in 1894 from Spencer Academy and entered Henry Kendall College, graduating five years later.

Parker first worked as a teacher at Spencer Academy and Armstrong Academy. In 1906 he attended the 1906 Oklahoma Constitutional Convention, where the state's constitution was developed. As a member of the convention, Parker led design of the Seal of Oklahoma, earning the nickname "Great Seal Parker". Parker later served as Register of the Treasury from 1913 to 1914. His appointment was reported as marking the first time a Native American held the post.

From 1915 to 1921 he was superintendent of the Five Civilized Tribes in Oklahoma. He was inducted into the Oklahoma Hall of Fame in 1932.

Parker died from a heart attack at his home in Oklahoma City on May 8, 1953, a few hours after hearing of his son's death from a heart attack in England on the same day.
