= Judson Whitlocke Lyons =

American politician and attorney (1858–1924)

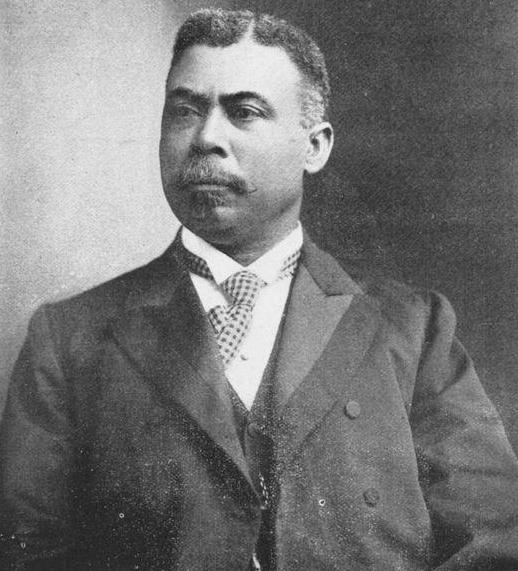
- Judson Whitlocke Lyons

10th Register of the Treasury
- In office April 7, 1898 – April 1, 1906
- President: William McKinley; Theodore Roosevelt
- Preceded by: Blanche Bruce
- Succeeded by: William Tecumseh Vernon

Personal details
- Born: August 15, 1858 Burke County, Georgia, U.S.
- Died: June 22, 1924 (aged 65) Richmond County, Georgia, U.S.
- Party: Republican
- Education: Howard University (LL.B.)
- Occupation: Lawyer

Judson Whitlocke Lyons (August 15, 1858 – June 22, 1924) was an African-American politician and attorney. He became the second African American attorney in Georgia in 1884 (following Styles Hutchins), and later served as the Register of the Treasury.

== Early life and education ==
Lyons was born into slavery in Burke County, Georgia on August 15, 1858 and moved with his family to Augusta, Georgia in 1871. He attended the Augusta Institute, which later became Morehouse College. Lyons graduated from the Howard University School of Law in 1884.

== Career ==
Lyons was active in Republican Party politics from an early age. In 1880, Lyons was the youngest member of the Republican National Convention at the age of 20. He briefly worked in the U.S. Treasury Department before enrolling in law school. After graduating Lyons was admitted to the Georgia Bar, becoming the second African American licensed to practice law in the state (following Styles Hutchins, who was admitted in 1878).

He formed a law firm in 1896 with Henry Moses Porter. Lyons was elected to represent Georgia on the Republican National Committee in 1896.

After his election President William McKinley sought to appoint Lyons as the Postmaster of Augusta but was withdrawn due to objections over his race. He was then appointed Register of the Treasury in 1898 and was the second African American to hold this post, and the second to have his signature appearing on U.S. Currency. He was reappointed in 1901 after receiving support from Booker T. Washington. Lyons later fell into disfavor with Washington after Washington learned that Lyons had expressed sympathy towards William Monroe Trotter after the 1903 Boston Riots. Lyons was not reappointed and left office in 1906. He lost reelection to the Republican National Committee in 1908.

After his political career Lyons served president of the Board of Trustees at the Haines Normal and Industrial Institute. Lyons died on June 22, 1924, in Augusta, Georgia.

== Legacy ==
The Judson Lyons Society at Morehouse College is named after Lyons; its mission is to engage and support Morehouse students for entry and opportunities in law.

== See also ==
- Republican National Convention

Preceded by Blanche Kelso Bruce	Register of the Treasury; April 7, 1898, to April 1, 1906	Succeeded by William Tecumseh Vernon
