= William Tecumseh Vernon =

American missionary (1871–1944)

William T. Vernon
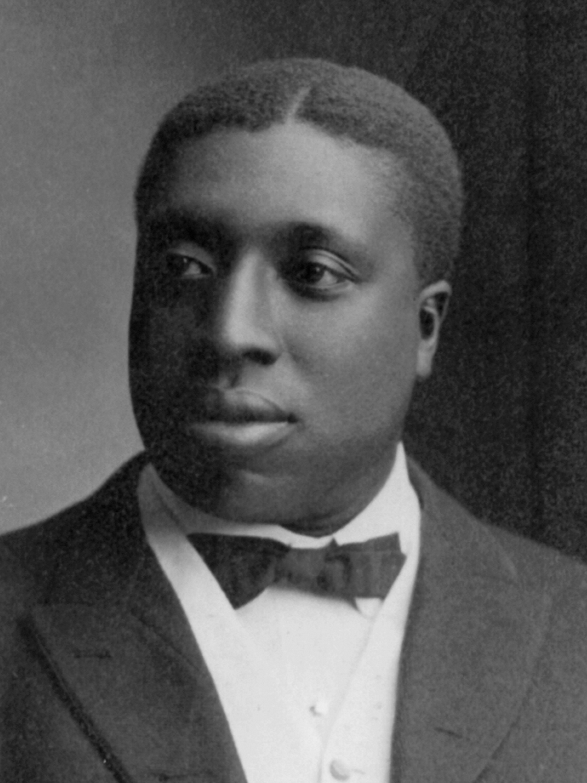

11th Register of the Treasury
- In office June 11, 1906 – March 14, 1911
- President: Theodore Roosevelt; William Howard Taft
- Preceded by: Judson Whitlocke Lyons
- Succeeded by: James Carroll Napier

Personal details
- Born: 11 July 1871 Lebanon, Missouri, U.S.
- Died: 25 July 1944 (aged 73) Kansas City, Kansas, U.S.
- Party: Republican
- Spouse: Emily J. Embry
- Parent: Rev. Adam Vernon
- Occupation: Minister
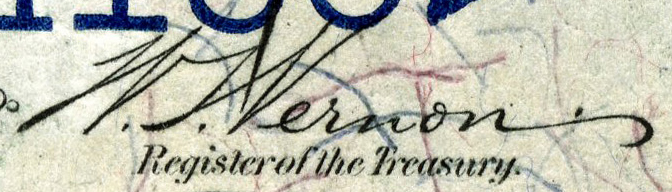
- Signature

William Tecumseh Vernon (July 11, 1871 – July 25, 1944) was an American educator, minister and bishop in the African Methodist Episcopal Church who served as president of Western University beginning in 1896 and Register of the Treasury from 1906 to 1911.

== Biography ==
William Tecumseh Vernon was born to former slaves north of Lebanon, Missouri. Formerly held by the Vernon family, his father and the family took their surname. His parents likely named their son after the Union general William Tecumseh Sherman, a hero during the Civil War. William went to school in Lebanon.

== Career ==
After graduation, Vernon taught at the Institute for several years. In 1896 at the age of 25, he was ordained as a minister in the African Methodist Episcopal Church.

That year he was appointed president of Western University, a historically black university near Kansas City supported by the A.M.E. Conference. He brought new energy to the school, gaining legislative support to add industrial education to the school. To support the new programs in training for agriculture and mechanical trades, he had facilities constructed, including new dormitories.

Vernon was a lifelong proponent of education:

With education symmetrical and true we will take the dead mass buried by slavery's hand and touch them to life. This beauteous angel, which has always done its work for those on earth, will roll away the stone from the tomb where is buried a race, and my people will come forth to their glory and the amazement of the world.

— William Tecumseh Vernon

Vernon achieved prominence as a Republican as president of Western University, and in 1906, he was appointed by President Theodore Roosevelt as Register of the Treasury. All US currency printed during his tenure carries the signature of William T. Vernon. He was briefly reappointed by William Howard Taft in 1910, but the president needed the position for his own patronage. Vernon accepted a federal appointment as the Supervisor of Indian and Negro Schools on a reservation in Oklahoma, newly admitted as a state combining the Indian and Oklahoma territories.

In 1912, the A.M.E. appointed him as president (1912–1915) of their affiliated Campbell College in Jackson, Mississippi. Following that, Vernon returned to the pastorate when called by Avery Chapel in Memphis, Tennessee, where he served (1916-1920).

After being consecrated as a bishop in 1920, Vernon soon left for South Africa, where he worked as a missionary in the Transvaal district for four years. The AME Church had been successful in building congregations among the indigenous peoples in South Africa. As early as the late nineteenth century, it was helping students come to the United States for college.

At the 1932 AME General Conference, members brought charges against three bishops: William Tecumseh Vernon, Joshua Jones, and William Decker Johnson. Ultimately, Vernon and Jones were suspended from their duties for misuse of conference funds. In addition, there were complaints that Vernon had been too close to some of his women parishioners. This was at a period when there had been several scandals among senior clergy in the AME and other churches, and its prestige was declining.

In 1933 during the Great Depression, after the A.M.E. Church withdrew its support from Western University, the state provided funding. The governor appointed Vernon as head of the industrial department. He appointed a strong faculty and succeeded in getting its accreditation restored before stepping down in 1936.

== Books ==
Vernon wrote two books on race and politics:

- The Upbuilding of a Race: or The Rise of a Great People, a compilation of sermons, addresses and writings on education, the race question and public affairs (1904)
- What the American Negro expects of World-wide Democracy: A statement of the Negro's Case and Cause (1919)
