= James Carroll Napier =

American businessman and Register of the Treasury

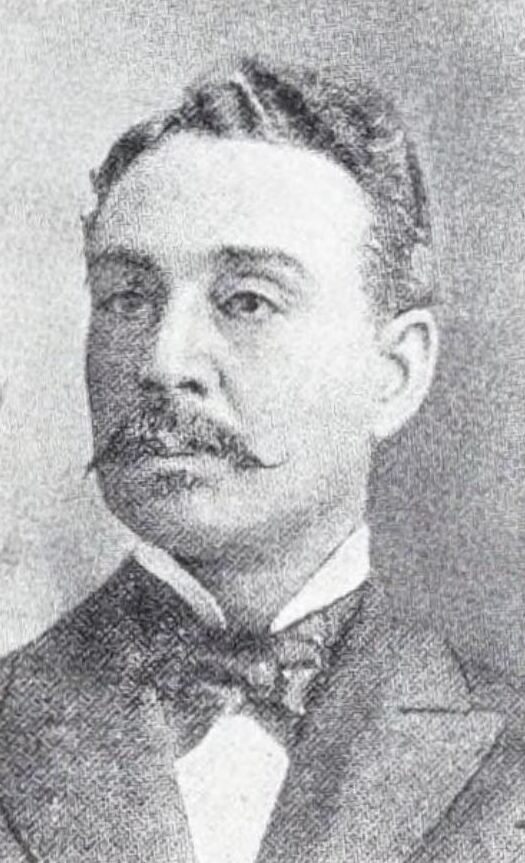
- James Carroll Napier, c. 1910

12th Register of the Treasury
- In office March 15, 1911 – September 30, 1913
- President: William Howard Taft; Woodrow Wilson
- Preceded by: William Tecumseh Vernon
- Succeeded by: Gabe E. Parker

Personal details
- Born: 9 June 1845 Nashville, Tennessee, U.S.
- Died: 21 April 1940 (aged 94) Nashville, Tennessee, U.S.
- Party: Republican
- Spouse: Nettie De Ella Langston (1860–1938)
- Children: Carrie Langston Napier (adopted; 1894–1918)
- Parent(s): William Carroll Napier; Jane Elizabeth Watkins
- Occupation: Lawyer, politician
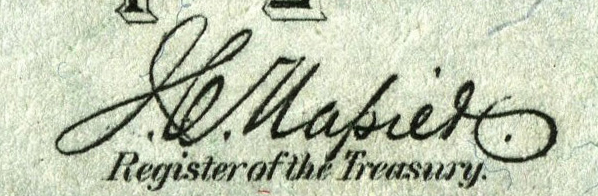
- Signature

James Carroll Napier (June 9, 1845 – April 21, 1940) was an American businessman, lawyer, politician, and civil rights leader from Nashville, Tennessee, who served as Register of the Treasury from 1911 to 1913. He is one of only five African Americans with their signatures on American currency. He was one of four African-American politicians appointed to a government positions under President William Howard Taft, sometimes referred to as Taft's "Black Cabinet." He was instrumental in founding civic institutions in Nashville to benefit the African-American business community and residents including educational opportunities.

== Early life ==
James Carroll Napier was born into slavery to William Carroll Napier and Jane Elizabeth Napier (née Watkins), who were both enslaved in Davidson County, Tennessee. His father was mixed race, the son of his White master, Dr. Elias Napier, and an enslaved mother named Judy. The Napier family were freed by their master in 1848.

Napier attended a private school for free black children in Nashville until whites forced it to be closed in 1856. He moved to Ohio, a free state, and in 1859, he enrolled in Wilberforce University. It was founded cooperatively as a historically black college by the AME Church and the Methodist Church of Cincinnati.

Napier later transferred to Oberlin College, the first American institution of higher learning to regularly admit female and black students in addition to white males. He left Oberlin in 1867 without a degree. While working in Washington, D.C., Napier earned his law degree from Howard University in 1872.

== Career ==
Napier returned to Tennessee law and was appointed to serve as the Commissioner of Refugees and Abandoned Lands in Davidson County for a year. He moved to Washington, D.C. to serve a political appointment as State Department Clerk, the first African American to hold this office.

After receiving his law degree, Napier returned to Nashville to establish his law practice. He became influential in the city's African-American community. He was elected to the Nashville City Council and the Tennessee Republican Executive Committee. Napier was elected as the first African-American president of the city council. He worked to hire African-American teachers for the Black public schools in the segregated system, and to organize the Black Fire-engine Company, to serve Black residents. Because of his work in Nashville and his association with Booker T. Washington of Tuskegee Institute, Napier had become an influential African-American leader.

In 1905, Napier founded a chapter in Nashville of the National Negro Business League, which had been organized in Washington D.C. five years before; Napier served as president of the local chapter. In 1904, he co-founded the One Cent Savings Bank (later renamed the Citizens' Savings Bank and Trust Company and still operating as of 2017).

Napier, Richard Henry Boyd, Preston Taylor, and others organized a strike against Nashville's segregated streetcar service that lasted from July 1905 until July 1906. Napier also presided over the Nashville Negro Board of Trade (now the Nashville Black Chamber of Commerce).

He served on the boards of Fisk University, a historically black college located in the city, and Howard University. He also was instrumental in gaining legislative approval to found Tennessee Agricultural and Industrial State College (now Tennessee State University), a historically black college. He later served on the board of the Nashville Housing Authority, the first black person to do so.

In 1911, Napier was appointed Register of the Treasury for William Howard Taft's administration. He was one of four African-American men appointed by Taft to high positions. They were known as the "Black Cabinet".

He served until 1913, resigning in protest after Democratic President Woodrow Wilson was elected and broke with federal precedent to order racial segregation of workspaces, restrooms, and lunchrooms for federal employees of the Treasury Department. Wilson ordered similar segregation at the Post Office and the Bureau of Engraving and Printing. In addition, in 1914 the Civil Service Commission began to require photographs with job applications, a means to screen out African Americans.

Returning to Nashville from Washington, D.C., Napier resumed his law practice.

== Personal life ==
While attending law school, Napier met John Mercer Langston, his wife Caroline, and their daughter Nettie. Langston was the founder and first dean of Howard University's law school. Napier married Nettie in Washington, DC, and she moved to join him in Nashville where he had established a law practice. They adopted a daughter, Carrie.

Napier was involved in extensive civic activities in Nashville. In 1910, he helped organize a Memphis, Tennessee chapter of Sigma Pi Phi, or Boulé, an organization of college-educated African-American men of high culture and status, along with Josiah T. Settle and some physicians in Memphis. The group said that "quality not numbers" was its aim for its membership.

After five months of illness, Napier died in Nashville, on April 21, 1940.

== Honors ==
Napier was granted an honorary Doctor of Laws degree from Fisk University. In 1970, the Historical Commission of Metropolitan Nashville and Davidson County erected a historical marker in the city to commemorate Napier's many accomplishments. The J. C. Napier Homes, a housing project operated by MDHA, the successor to the Nashville Housing Authority, is named in his honor.
