= Houston B. Teehee =

Register of the United States Treasury (1915–1919)

Houston Benge Teehee
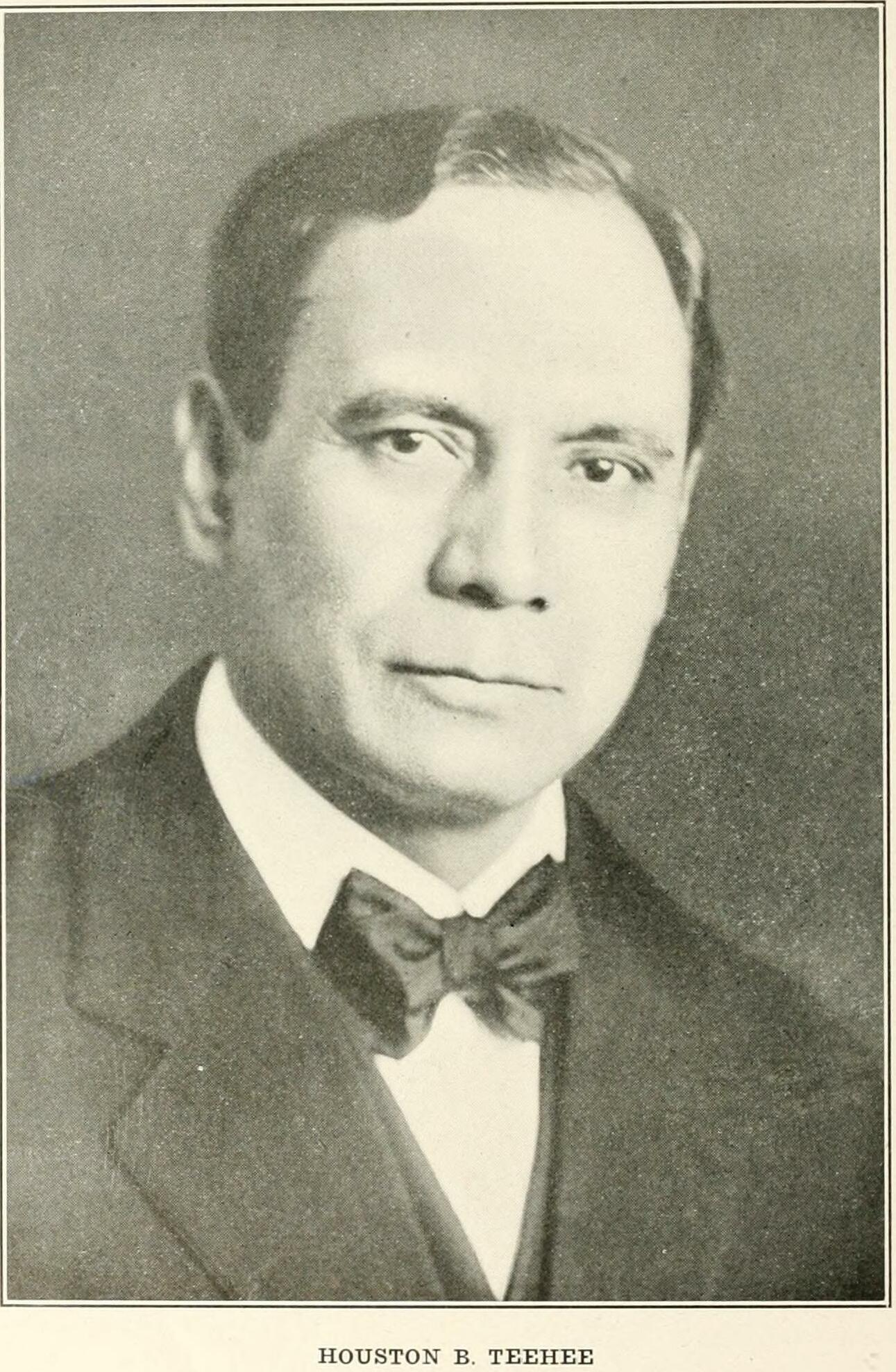
- Houston B. Teehee, circa 1921

Oklahoma Supreme Court Commissioner for the First Judicial District
- In office May 28, 1927 – December 31, 1930
- Preceded by: position established
- Succeeded by: position disestablished

14th Register of the Treasury
- In office March 24, 1915 – October 31, 1919
- President: Woodrow Wilson
- Preceded by: Gabe E. Parker
- Succeeded by: William S. Elliott

Member of the Oklahoma House of Representatives from the Cherokee County district
- In office 1910–1914
- Preceded by: Henry Ward
- Succeeded by: J. D. Cox

Mayor of Tahlequah, Oklahoma
- In office 1907–1909
- Preceded by: Horace Gray
- Succeeded by: T.J. Adair

Alderman of Tahlequah, Indian Territory
- In office 1902–1906

Personal details
- Born: October 14 or 31 1874 Muldrow, Cherokee Nation
- Died: November 19, 1953 (aged 79)
- Citizenship: Cherokee Nation; American (after 1907) (Note: Cherokee Nation citizens were granted United States citizenship in 1907.)
- Party: Democratic Party

Houston Benge Teehee (sometimes spelled Tehee) (October 14 or 31, 1874 – November 19, 1953) was an American lawyer and politician from Oklahoma most known for serving as Register of the Treasury from 1915 to 1919. Teehee was from a prominent Cherokee family, with his father serving in all three branches of the Cherokee Nation's government. Before and after statehood, he was elected to positions in city government in Tahlequah, Oklahoma, between 1902 and 1910 when he was elected to the Oklahoma House of Representatives, where he would serve two terms. After serving as Register of the Treasury he returned to Oklahoma and continued to practice law, until he was appointed assistant attorney general in 1926; in 1927, he was appointed to the Oklahoma Supreme Court Commission. He retired from political office after his Commissioner term expired in 1930.

== Family, early life, and education ==
Teehee (Note: The surname is said to have originated when his grandfather, whose name was transliterated by later sources as "Dehininee" and "Di-hi-hi", (meaning "killer"), enlisted in the Union Army during the American Civil War; "the nearest the recruiting sergeant could come to it was 'Teehee', and so it went into the record and became affixed as a family name.") was born in the town of Muldrow, in the Cherokee Nation (modern-day Oklahoma) on October 14 or 31, 1874. (Note: Sources disagree on whether Teehee was born on October 14th or October 31st of 1874.) He was five-eighths Cherokee. (Note: According to Emmet Starr's 1922 History of the Cherokee Indians and Their Legends and Folk Lore, "On the rolls of the Cherokee Nation his father is listed as seven-eighths Cherokee. Houston B. Teehee as five-eighths. His mother was a one-half Cherokee, her death occurring prior to the enrollment.") His father, Rev. Stephen Teehee (or "Tehee") (1837–1907) was a Baptist minister and a unilingual speaker of Cherokee, who was originally from Cherokee territory in Georgia; at various times, he served the Cherokee Nation as a district clerk, a district solicitor, and a circuit judge, and was part of its Executive Council and its senate. His mother was Rhoda Benge, who died in 1886, when she was thirty-nine; at the time, Teehee was twelve.

Teehee attended the Cherokee Male Seminary in Tahlequah, Oklahoma, and afterward spent one year at Fort Worth University. He was bilingual, speaking both Cherokee and English, and described learning English as "the most difficult thing I had to do."

He then returned to Tahlequah, where he spent ten years working in retail, and two in a bank. During this time, he studied law with John H. Pitchford.

== Political and business careers ==
In 1902, Teehee was elected alderman of Tahlequah, a position he retained until 1906. In March 1907, he was admitted to the bar. Later that year, he was elected Mayor of Tahlequah succeeding Horace Gray, the city's first Republican mayor. At the end of his term in 1909, he was succeeded by T.J. Adair. In June 1908 he resigned from the bank and opened his own law practice.

In 1910, Teehee successfully petitioned the Secretary of the Interior to remove his guardianship restriction for being Native American. The same year, he ran for the Oklahoma House of Representatives as a Democrat and was elected to represent Cherokee County; he was subsequently re-elected to this position in 1912. (Note: Sources differ on listing his term in office as starting in 1910/12 or 1911/13, because elections were held in even-numbered years and the new legislative session would start in the following odd-numbered year. In Oklahoma, legislators officially take office the year of their election.)

After leaving the Oklahoma House in 1914, he was appointed as a United States Probate Attorney in the United States Department of the Interior. On March 3, 1915, Woodrow Wilson nominated Teehee to be Register of the United States Treasury, replacing Gabe E. Parker; Teehee was sworn in on March 24, 1915. As Register, Teehee personally signed so many Liberty Bonds that he experienced repetitive strain injury, permanently damaging his hand and arm. In October 1919, Teehee announced his resignation as Register, to become effective as of the 31st of that month.

After leaving the United States Treasury in 1919, he entered the private sector and was the treasurer for Seamans Oil Company and the R. E. Seaman Company. By 1921 he was one of the vice-presidents of the Continental Asphalt and Petroleum Company. He served as an assistant attorney general from 1926 until his appointment to the Oklahoma Supreme Court Commission's First Judicial District on May 28, 1927. His term ended on December 31, 1930. (Note: While some sources list his term on the Oklahoma Supreme Court Commission as ending in 1931, the official end date of his term was December 31, 1930.)

== Personal life, death, and legacy ==
Teehee was inducted into the Oklahoma Hall of Fame in 1942. He was Presbyterian.

He died on November 19, 1953.
