= United States two-dollar bill =

Current denomination of United States currency

Two dollars
- Country: United States
- Value: $2.00
- Width: 6.14 in [before 1929: 7.375 inches (187.3 mm)] ≈ 155.95 mm
- Height: 2.61 in [before 1929: 3.125 inches (79.4 mm)] ≈ 66.29 mm
- Weight: Approx. 1 g
- Security features: Security fibers, raised printing
- Material used: 75% cotton 25% linen
- Years of printing: 1862–1966, 1976–present (Federal Reserve Note, current form)

Obverse
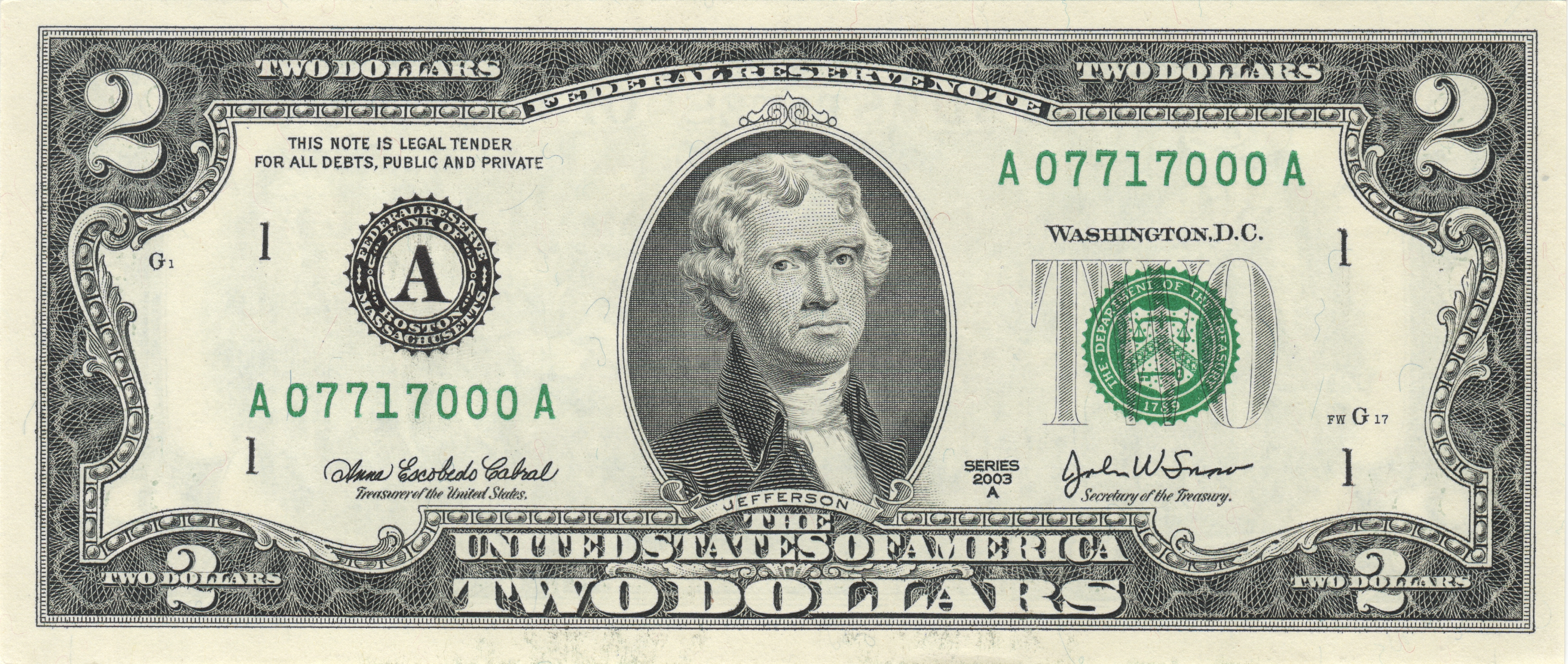
- Design: Thomas Jefferson
- Design date: 1928

Reverse
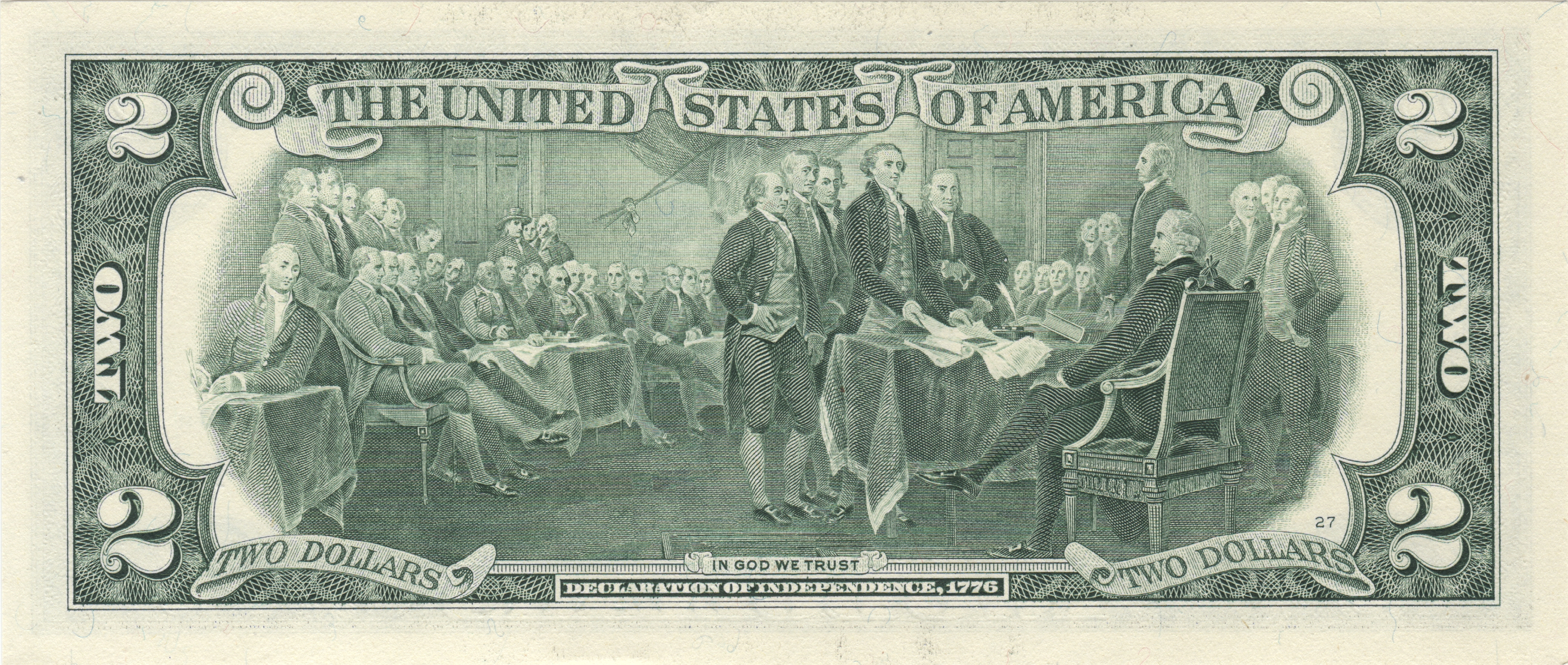
- Design: Declaration of Independence (painting)
- Design date: 1976

The United States two-dollar bill (US$2) is a current denomination of United States currency. A portrait of Thomas Jefferson, the third president of the United States (1801–1809), is featured on the obverse of the note. The reverse features an engraving of John Trumbull's painting Declaration of Independence (c. 1818).

Throughout the $2 bill's pre-1929 life as a large-sized note, it was issued as a United States Note, a National Bank Note, a Silver Certificate, a Treasury or "Coin" Note, and a Federal Reserve Bank Note. In 1928, when U.S. currency was redesigned and reduced to its current size, the $2 bill was issued only as a United States Note. Production continued until 1966, when United States Notes were phased out; the $2 denomination was discontinued until 1976, when it was reissued as a Federal Reserve Note, with a new reverse design. The obverse design of the $2 bill is the oldest of all current U.S. currency.

Because many business' banking policies do not rely on $2 bills, fewer are produced and therefore circulate much less than other denominations of U.S. currency. This scarcity in circulation has contributed to low public awareness that the bill is still printed, inspiring urban legends, spreading misinformation, and creating difficulty for people who try to spend them. Some merchants are unfamiliar with $2 bills and question their validity or authenticity. In spite of its relatively low production figures, the apparent scarcity of the $2 bill in daily commerce also indicates that significant numbers of the notes are removed from circulation, collected by many who see them as scarcer and more valuable than common bills.

== Denomination overview ==
Authorized under an act by the United States Congress, the first two-dollar bill was issued in March 1862 and the denomination was continuously used until 1966; by that time, the United States Note was the only remaining class of U.S. currency to which the two-dollar bill was assigned. In August 1966, the Treasury Department discontinued production of the $2 and $5 denominations of United States Notes. While the $5 denomination had been issued simultaneously as a Federal Reserve Note, a United States Note and a Silver Certificate, the $2 denomination was not immediately reassigned to the Federal Reserve Note class of United States currency, thus was fully discontinued. The Treasury cited low usage of the two-dollar bill as the reason for not immediately resuming use of the denomination. Production of the two-dollar denomination was resumed in December, 1975, and the two-dollar bill was finally reissued in the spring of 1976 as a Federal Reserve Note with a new reverse design featuring John Trumbull's depiction of the drafting of the United States Declaration of Independence, replacing the previous design of Monticello. The two-dollar note has remained a current denomination of U.S. currency since that time. As estimated at the time, if two-dollar notes replaced about half of the one-dollar notes in circulation, the federal government would be able to save about $26 million in 1976 dollars ($147 million in 2025 adjusted for inflation) over the period from 1976 to 1981, due to reduced production, storage, and shipping costs.

However, due to their limited use, two-dollar notes are not printed as frequently in a new series as other denominations, which are produced according to demand. Most bill acceptors found in vending machines, self checkout lanes, transit systems, ATM's and other automated kiosks are configured to accommodate two-dollar bills, even if the fact is not stated on the device. Although they are generally available at most banks, two-dollar notes are usually not handed out except upon specific request by the customer, and may require the teller to make a trip to the vault, or order the desired amount if not present at the branch.

== Rarity ==
The common misconception that the $2 note is no longer being produced also remains, though $2 notes have been printed since 1862, except for a 10-year hiatus between 1966 and 1976. The U.S. Treasury reports that $1,549,052,714 worth of $2 bills were in circulation worldwide as of April 30, 2007.

A United States Series 2017 A two-dollar Federal Reserve note (serial number L10888867A) featuring four consecutive 8s in the serial number. The note shows the portrait of Thomas Jefferson and is signed by Treasurer of the United States Jovita Carranza and Secretary of the Treasury Steven T. Mnuchin.

Unusual serial numbers (example: A11111111A) and replacement notes (known by collectors as "star notes" and designated by a star in the serial number) can raise the collector value of some bills. "Collectible" or "enhanced" two-dollar bills, commemorating America's national parks and other places, people, and events, have been made and sold by coin dealers and others in recent years merely by adding color, special graphics or color printed plastic overlays onto regular-issue $2 notes by using computer printers. The creators and marketers of many of these notes unscrupulously imply that they are authorized or issued by the federal government; however, no "collectible" or "enhanced" two-dollar bills have been authorized by the United States Treasury, the Bureau of Engraving and Printing, nor any other government agency and the bills have no value above their $2 face on the collectors' market.

Certain conventions and tourism/convention bureaus capitalize on the scarcity of $2 notes in circulation, encouraging convention attendees and tourists to spend the bills to illustrate to the host communities the economic impact that the conventions and tourism bring. Sometimes known as "SpendTom" campaigns, the $2 bills linger in the community as a constant reminder. Some campaigns encourage people to participate in a hunt for the bills to win prizes.

== History ==
=== Large-sized notes ===
(approximately 7.4218 in × 3.125 in ≅ 188.51 mm × 79.375 mm)

In March 1862, the first $2 bill was issued as a Legal Tender Note (United States Note) with a portrait of Alexander Hamilton; the portrait of Hamilton used was a profile view, different from the familiar portrait in use on the small-sized $10 bill since 1928.

By 1869, the $2 United States Note was redesigned with the now-familiar portrait of Thomas Jefferson to the left and a vignette of the United States Capitol in the center of the obverse. This note also featured green tinting on the top and left side of the obverse. Although this note is technically a United States Note, TREASURY NOTE appeared on it instead of UNITED STATES NOTE. The reverse was completely redesigned. This series was again revised in 1874; changes on the obverse included removing the green tinting, adding a red floral design around WASHINGTON D.C., and changing the term TREASURY NOTE to UNITED STATES NOTE. The 1874 design was also issued as Series of 1875 and 1878, and by 1880, the red floral design around WASHINGTON D.C. on the United States Note was removed and the serial numbers were changed to blue. This note with the red floral design was also issued as Series of 1917 but with red serial numbers by that time.

National Bank Notes were issued in 1875 and feature a woman unfurling a flag and a large sideways '2' ("Lazy Deuce") on the obverse. The reverse has Sir Walter Raleigh smoking tobacco and an eagle with a shield. In 1886, the first $2 silver certificate with a portrait of United States Civil War General Winfield Scott Hancock on the left of the obverse was issued. This design continued until 1891 when a new $2 Silver Certificate was issued with a portrait of U.S. Treasury Secretary William Windom in the center of the obverse. Two-dollar Treasury, or "Coin", Notes were first issued for government purchases of silver bullion in 1890 from the silver mining industry. The reverse featured large wording of TWO in the center and a numeral 2 to the right surrounded by an ornate design that occupied almost the entire note. In 1891, the reverse of the Series of 1890 Treasury Note was redesigned because the treasury felt that it was too "busy", making it too easy to counterfeit. More open space was incorporated into the new design.

In 1896, the "Educational Series" Silver Certificate was issued. The entire obverse of the note was covered in artwork with an allegorical figure of science presenting steam and electricity to commerce and manufacture. The reverse of the note featured portraits of Robert Fulton and Samuel F. B. Morse surrounded by an ornate design that occupied almost the entire note. By 1899, however, The $2 Silver Certificate was redesigned with a small portrait of George Washington surrounded by allegorical figures representing agriculture and mechanics. Large-sized Federal Reserve Bank Notes were issued in 1918. Each note was an obligation of the issuing Federal Reserve Bank and could only be redeemed at the corresponding bank. The obverse of the note featured a borderless portrait of Thomas Jefferson to left and wording in the entire center. The reverse featured a World War I battleship.

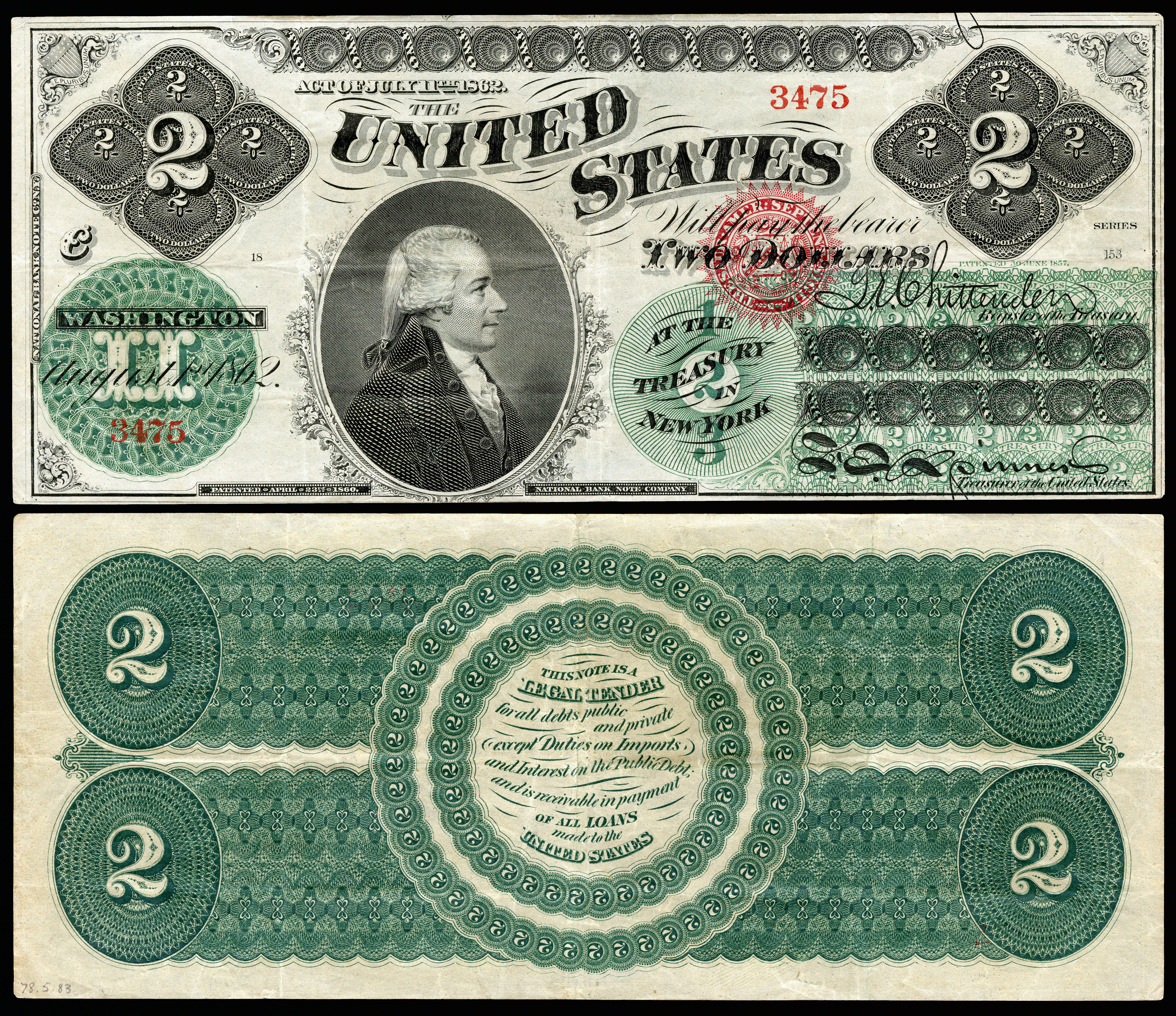
First $2 bill issued in 1862 as a Legal Tender Note.

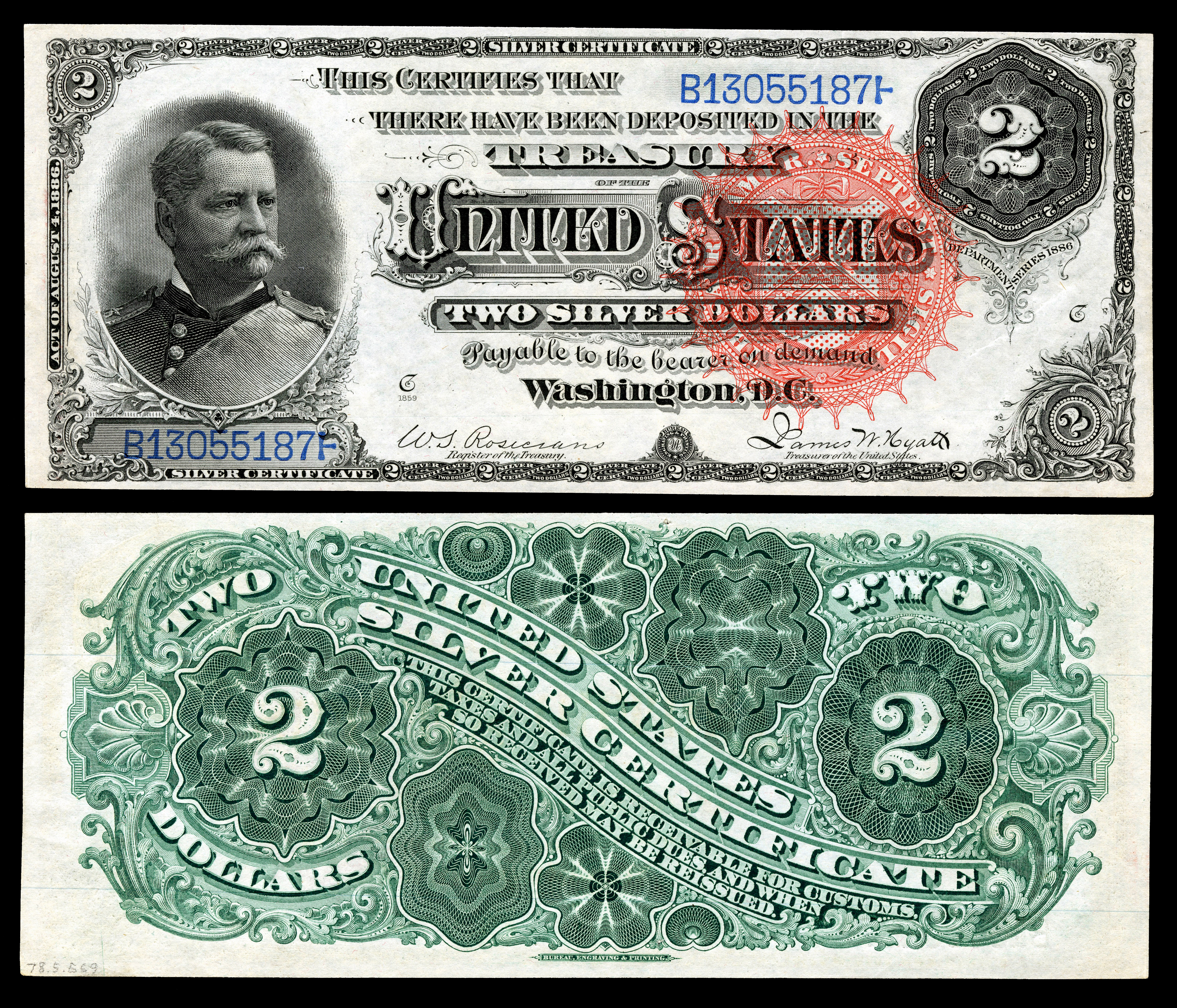
Series 1886 $2 Silver Certificate depicting Winfield Scott Hancock

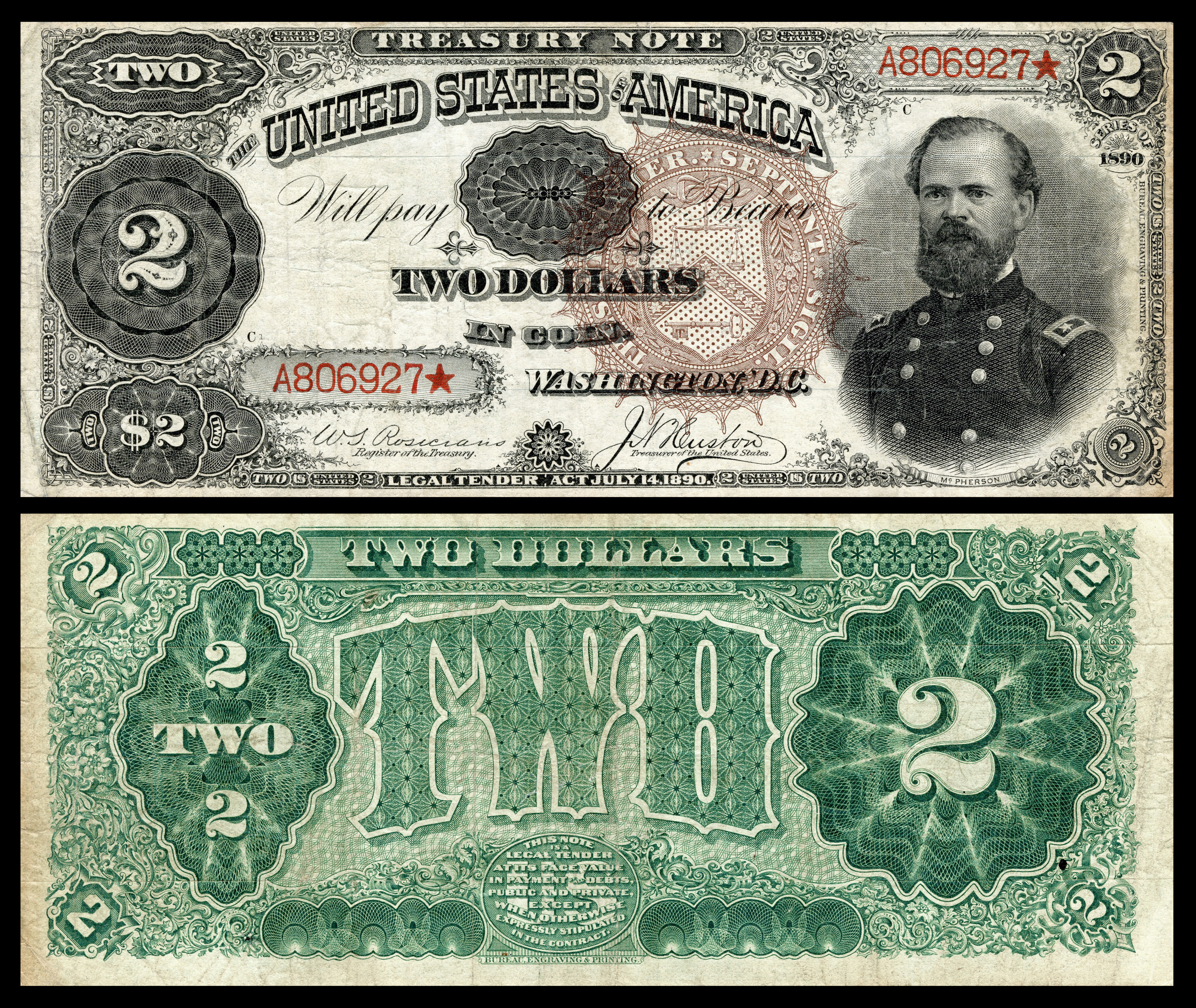
Series 1890 featuring James McPherson. This "Coin Note" was used for government purchases of silver bullion from the mining industry.

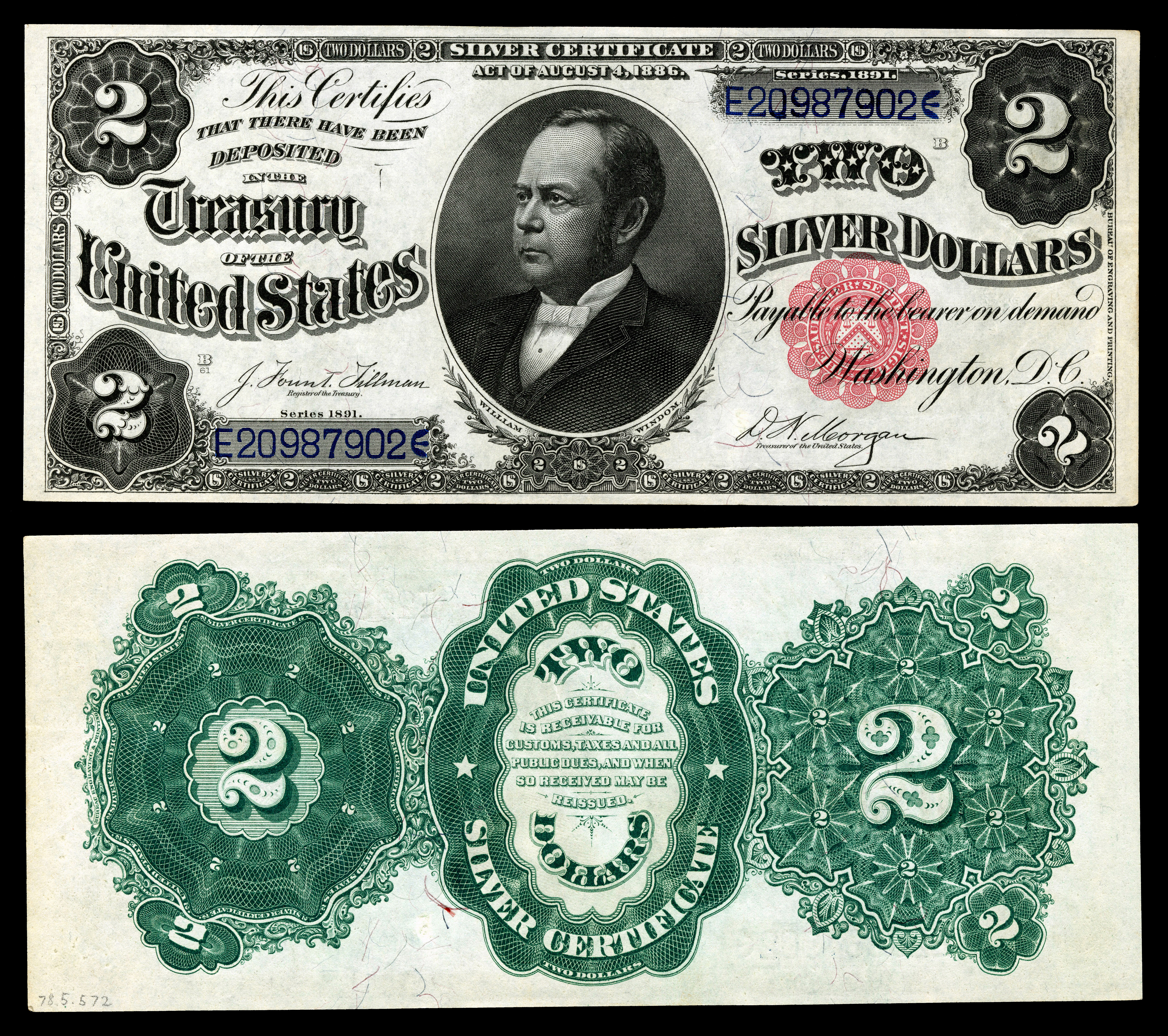
The second two-dollar denomination in the silver certificate series printed in 1891. This note features United States Secretary of the Treasury William Windom.

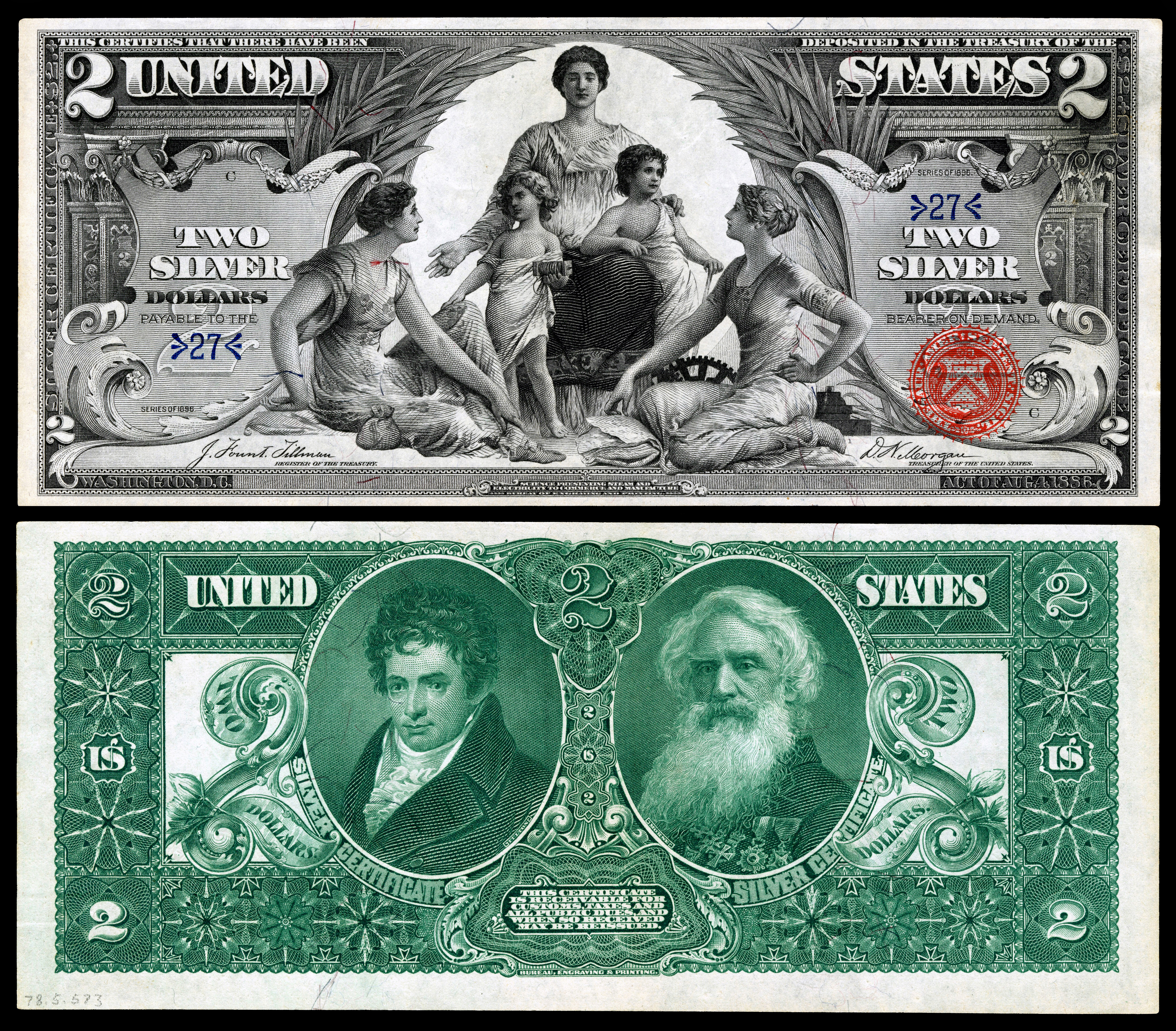
Robert Fulton and Samuel Morse depicted on the reverse of the 1896 $2 'Educational Series" Silver Certificate.

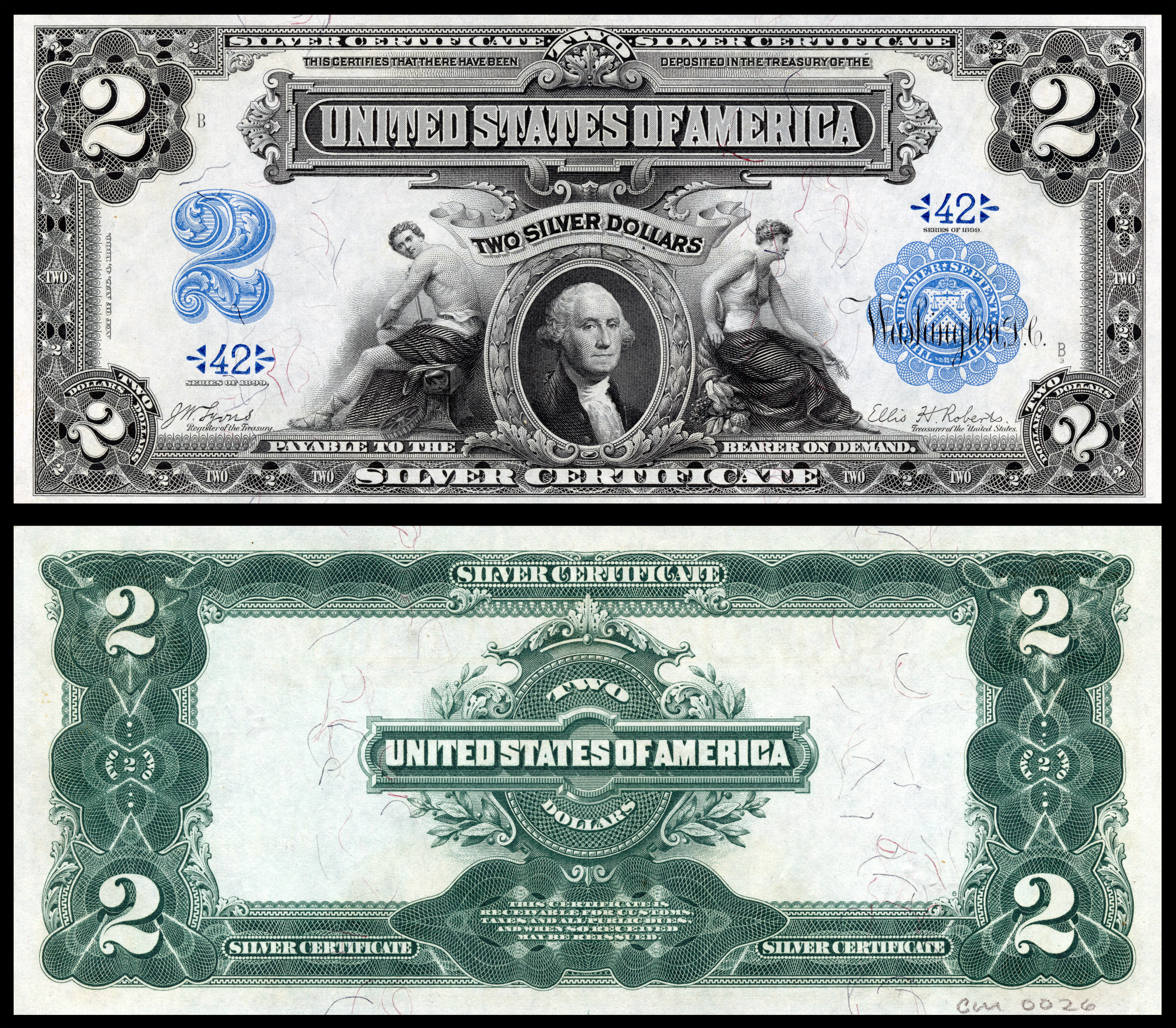
The final design of the United States' silver certificate series featuring George Washington, printed in 1899.

=== Small size notes ===
(6.14 in × 2.61 in ≅ 156 mm × 66 mm)

==== 1928–1966 ====
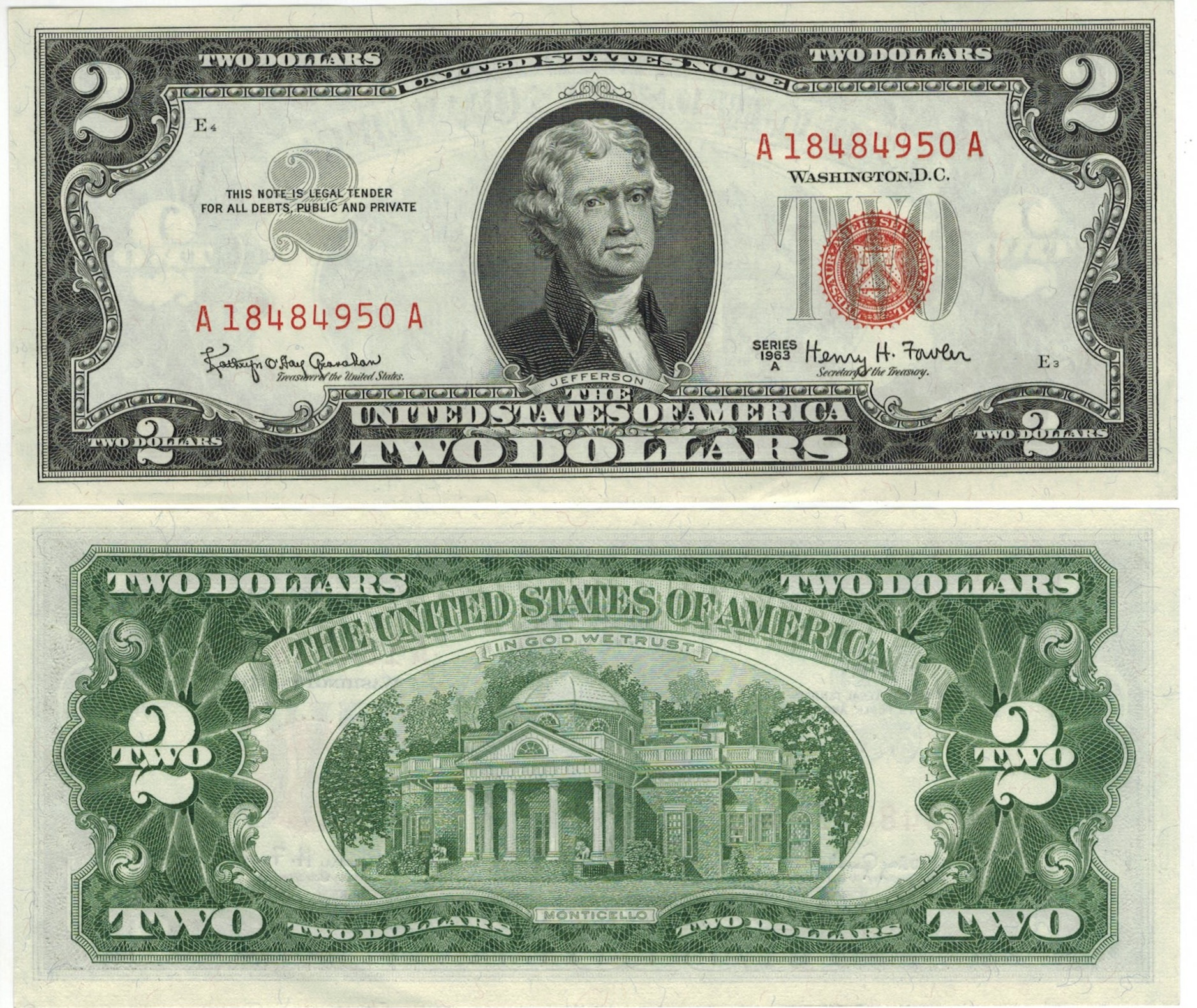
U.S. $2 bill series 1963A red-seal

In 1928, when all U.S. currency was redesigned and downsized, the $2 bill was issued only as a United States Note. The obverse featured a cropped version of Thomas Jefferson's portrait that had been on previous $2 bills. The reverse featured Jefferson's home, Monticello. As with all United States Notes, the treasury seal and serial numbers were printed in red ink. The Series of 1928 $2 bill featured the treasury seal superimposed by the United States Note obligation to the left and a large gray TWO to the right.

During the 1950s, production of $2 bills began to decrease. The relative scarcity of the notes led some to start saving any they received, with the inevitable result that the bills became less common in circulation.

In 1953, the $2 bill, along with the $5 United States Note, received minor design changes. The treasury seal was made smaller and moved to the right side of the bill; it was superimposed over the gray word TWO. The United States Note obligation now became superimposed over a gray numeral 2. The reverse remained unchanged.

The final change to $2 United States Notes came in 1963 (as Series 1963) when the motto IN GOD WE TRUST was added to the reverse over the Monticello. Further, because silver certificates were soon to be no longer redeemable in silver, WILL PAY TO THE BEARER ON DEMAND was removed from the obverse. $2 and $5 United States Notes were discontinued in August, 1966.

==== 1976–present ====
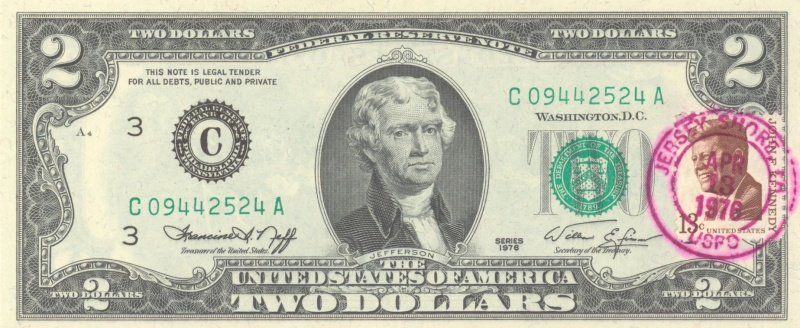
Series 1976 first day of issue $2 note with a canceled JFK postage stamp.

On November 3, 1975, Secretary of the Treasury William E. Simon announced the reissuance of the $2 note as a cost-saving measure; Series 1976 $2 notes would be available from banks on April 13, 1976, Thomas Jefferson's birthday. Series 1976 $2 bills were partially redesigned and reissued as a Federal Reserve Note. The note retains the same portrait of Jefferson, and the basic design of the obverse remained unchanged since 1928. The treasury seal and serial numbers are printed in green ink, replacing the red used on the previous United States Note. Since the reintroduction of the note coincided with the United States Bicentennial, it was decided to use a bicentennial-themed design on the reverse, although the bill was not issued specifically to celebrate the bicenntenial, as is widely believed. An engraved rendition (not an exact reproduction) of John Trumbull's Declaration of Independence replaced Monticello on the reverse. First-day issues of the new $2 bills could be taken to a post office and stamped with the date "APR 13 1976". The BEP produced a total of 590,720,000 notes from Series 1976, the final run printed in 1978.

Currently, stamped Series 1976 $2 notes typically trade for about twice their face value. If the bills were stamped in a city with an unusual name, the value may be slightly higher. However, no first-day-issued 1976 $2 bills with postage stamps are especially rare or valuable.

Despite their age, crisp, uncirculated Series 1976 $2 notes are not uncommon and are not particularly valuable. More than a half billion series 1976 $2 notes were printed and a very large number were saved and hoarded upon their original issue. A typical, single uncirculated 1976 $2 bill is worth only slightly above $2 face value. An average, circulated Series 1976 note has no additional value above its $2 face.

In 1996 and 1997, 153,600,000 bills were printed as Series 1995 for the Federal Reserve District of Atlanta. Beginning with Series 1995, all $2 notes have been produced at the Western Currency Facility in Fort Worth, Texas. In 2004, 121,600,000 of the Series 2003 bills were printed for the Federal Reserve District of Minneapolis. An issue of Series 2003A $2 bills was printed from July to September 2006 for all twelve Federal Reserve Banks. In all, 220,800,000 notes were printed.

In February 2012, the BEP printed 512,000 Series 2009 $2 Star Notes, in anticipation of more regular runs being printed later in 2012. Series 2009 $2 bills were issued to banks during the autumn of 2012.

In November 2013, the BEP began printing Series 2013 $2 notes for the Federal Reserve Bank of Atlanta; these notes entered circulation in early 2014. A total of 44,800,000 notes were ordered for fiscal year 2014, which ran from October 2013 through September 2014. Series 2017A $2 notes were first issued to banks in December 2019. Production of series 2021 $2 star notes for the Federal Reserve Bank of Kansas City (J) began in March, 2025.

=== Series dates ===
==== Large size ====
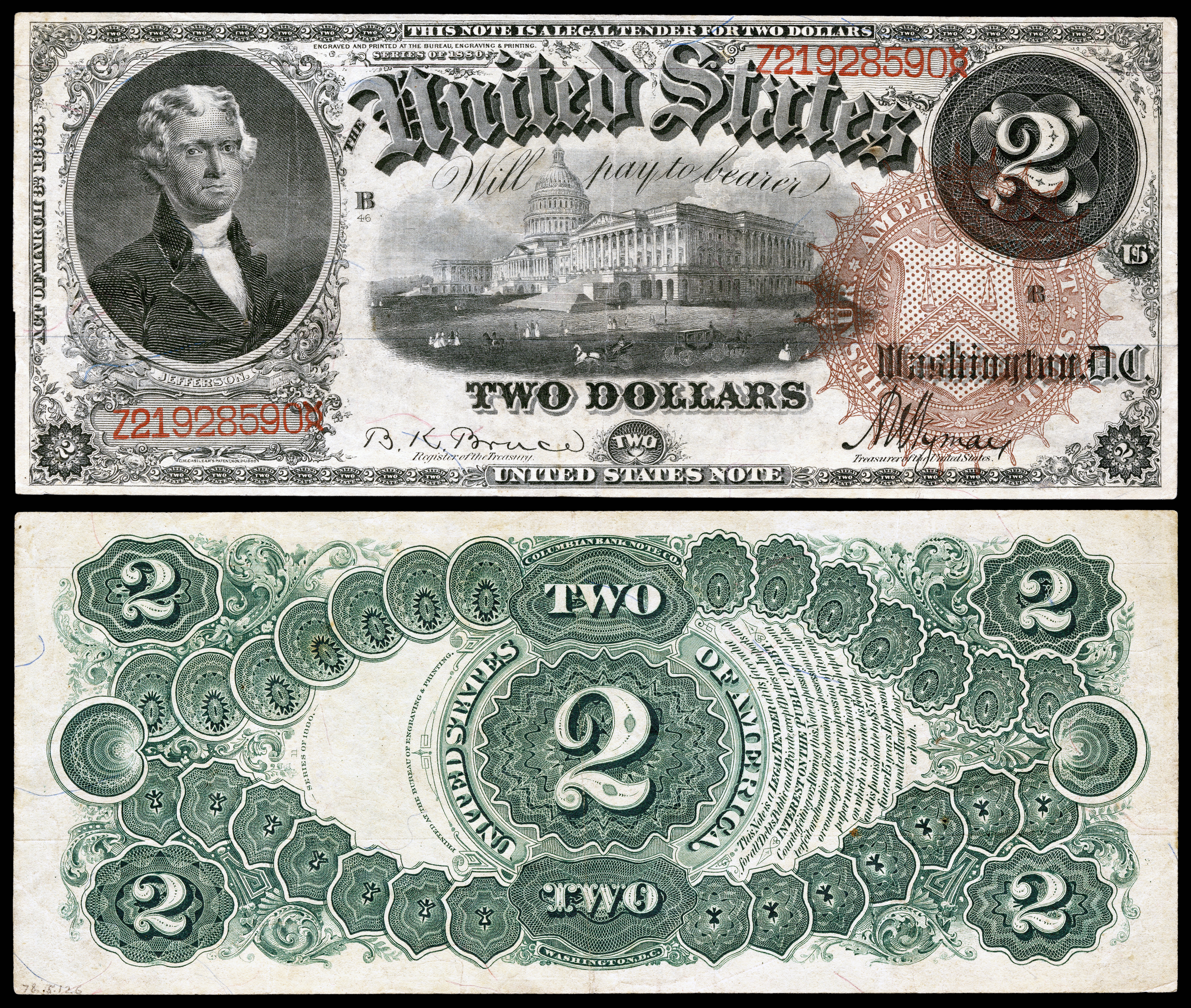
Series 1880 $2 Legal Tender note showing a large brown treasury seal. The signatures of Blanche Bruce & A. U. Wyman are present on the obverse near the bottom.

Type	Series	Register^{α}	Treasurer^{α}	Seal^{α}	Notes
Legal Tender Note	1862	Lucius E. Chittenden	F. E. Spinner	Small Red w/rays	Also called a "Greenback".
Legal Tender Note	1869	John Allison	F. E. Spinner	Large Red	Nicknamed: "Rainbow Note" from its red, white, and blue colors.
Legal Tender Note	1874	John Allison	F. E. Spinner	Small Red w/rays	
Legal Tender Note	1875	John Allison	New & Wyman	Small Red w/rays	
Legal Tender Note	1878	Allison & Scofield	James Gilfillan	Small Red w/rays	Scofield/Gilfillan combo is scarce
Legal Tender Note	1880	Scofield, Bruce, Rosecrans, and Tillman	Gilfillan, Wyman, Huston, Nebeker, and Morgan	Large Brown/Red; Small Red scalloped	
Legal Tender Note	1917	Teehee, Elliott, and Speelman	John Burke & White	Small Red scalloped	
National Bank Note	Original	Colby, Jeffries, and Allison	F. E. Spinner	Small Red w/rays	Jeffries/Spinner combo is very rare
National Bank Note	1875	Allison & Scofield	New, Wyman, and Gilfillan	Small Red scalloped	Nicknamed: "Lazy Deuce" along with the original series from the position of the "2" on the note.
Silver Certificate	1886	William S. Rosecrans	Jordan, Hyatt, and Huston	Large Brown/Red; Small Red scalloped	
Silver Certificate	1891	William S. Rosecrans	Benjamin Harrison	Large Red	
Silver Certificate	1891	Rosecrans & Tillman	Nebecker & Morgan	Small Red scalloped	
Silver Certificate	1896	Tillman & Bruce	Morgan & Roberts	Small Red w/rays	Part of the "Educational Series".
Silver Certificate	1899	Lyons, Vernon, Napier, Parker, Teehee, Elliott, and Speelman	Roberts, Treat, McClung, Thompson, Burke, and White	Blue	
Treasury Note	1890	William S. Rosecrans	Huston & Nebecker	Large Brown & Small Red scalloped	
Treasury Note	1890	William S. Rosecrans	Benjamin Harrison	Large Red	
Treasury Note	1891	Rosecrans, Tillman, and Bruce	Nebecker, Morgan, and Roberts	Small Red scalloped	
Federal Reserve Bank Note	1918	Teehee & Elliott	John Burke	Blue	Nicknamed: "Battleship note" from the reverse design.

==== Small size ====
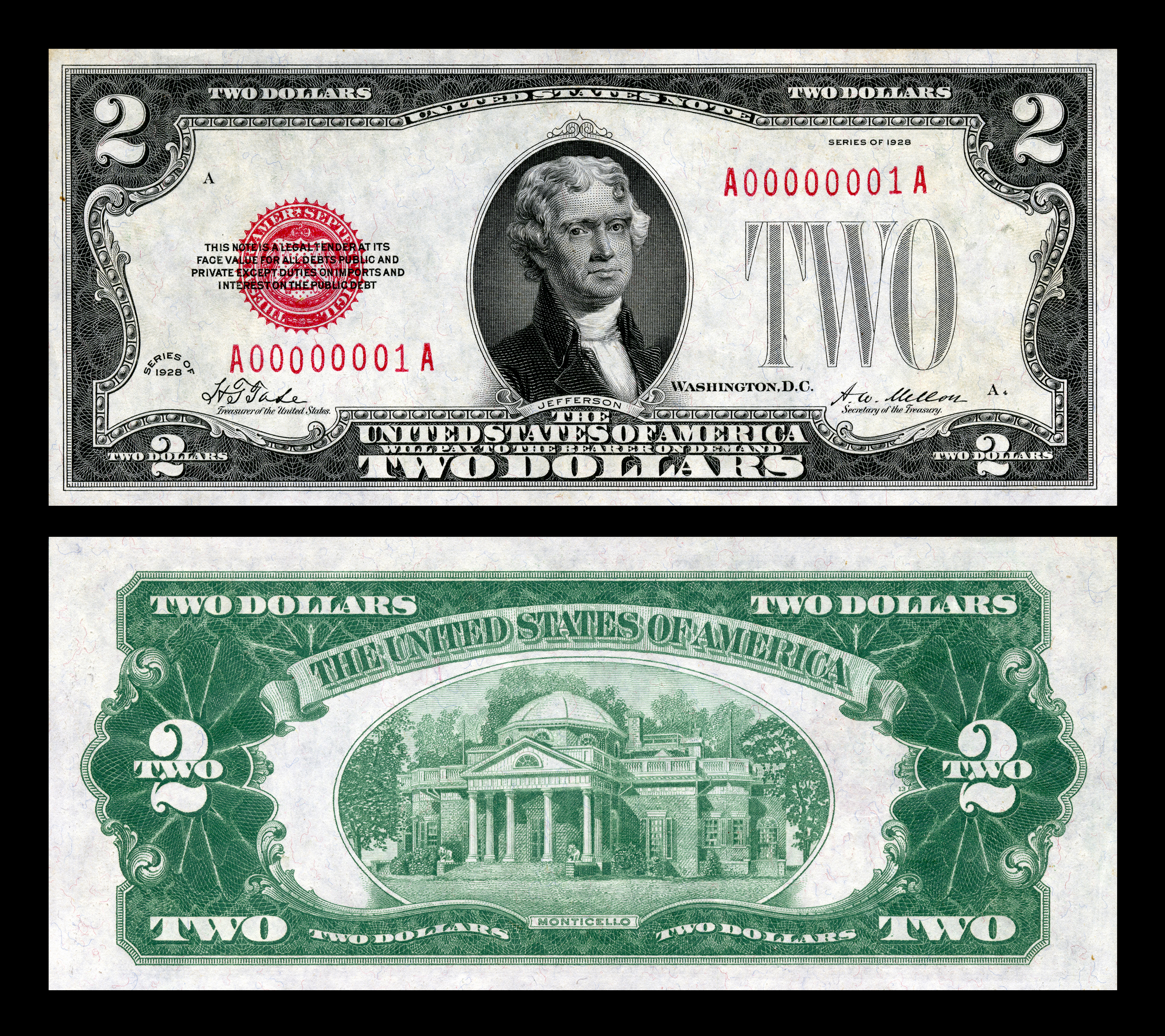
A Series 1928 $2 bill with the serial number A0000001A, kept as part of the National Numismatic Collection.

Type	Series	Treasurer^{α}	Secretary^{α}	Seal	Year(s) of issue
Legal Tender Note	1928	Tate	Mellon	Red	
Legal Tender Note	1928A	Woods	Mellon	Red	
Legal Tender Note	1928B	Woods	Mills	Red	
Legal Tender Note	1928C	Julian	Morgenthau	Red	sometime in 1934–1945
Legal Tender Note	1928D	Julian	Morgenthau	Red	sometime in 1934–1945
Legal Tender Note	1928E	Julian	Vinson	Red	
Legal Tender Note	1928F	Julian	Snyder	Red	
Legal Tender Note	1928G	Clark	Snyder	Red	
Legal Tender Note	1953	Priest	Humphrey	Red	
Legal Tender Note	1953A	Priest	Anderson	Red	
Legal Tender Note	1953B	Smith	Dillon	Red	
Legal Tender Note	1953C	Granahan	Dillon	Red	
Legal Tender Note	1963	Granahan	Dillon	Red	
Legal Tender Note	1963A	Granahan	Fowler	Red	
Federal Reserve Note	1976	Neff	Simon	Green	
Federal Reserve Note	1995	Withrow	Rubin	Green	
Federal Reserve Note	2003	Marin	Snow	Green	
Federal Reserve Note	2003A	Cabral	Snow	Green	
Federal Reserve Note	2009	Rios	Geithner	Green	
Federal Reserve Note	2013	Rios	Lew	Green	
Federal Reserve Note	2017A	Carranza	Mnuchin	Green	
Federal Reserve Note	2021	Malerba	Yellen	Green	

^α These are sourced by The Official Red Book (Whitman).

== Visual chronology ==
A chronological display of the American two-dollar bill.

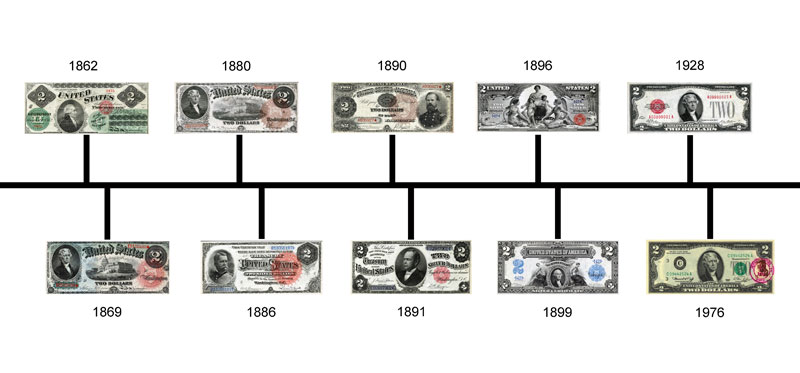
The design of two-dollar bill throughout the history of the United States.

== Society and culture ==
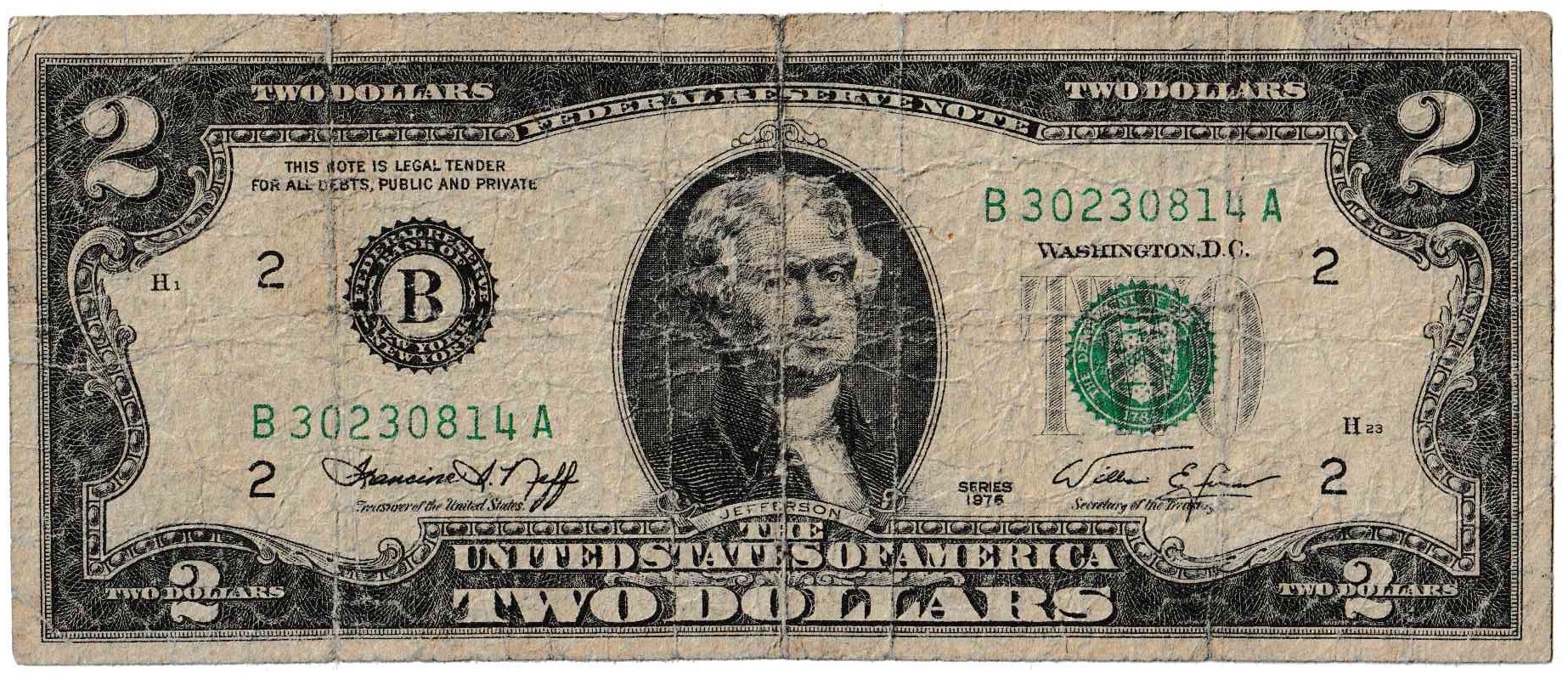
A series 1976 $2 bill, heavily worn from over four decades in circulation

Because $2 bills are uncommon in daily use, their use can make spenders visible. A documented case of using two-dollar bills to send a message to a community is the case of Geneva Steel and the communities in the surrounding Utah County. In 1989, Geneva Steel re-opened after a yearlong furlough and change in ownership, and subsequently paid its employee bonuses in $2 bills. When the $2 bills began to circulate more widely than usual, people recognized the importance of the company to the local economy.

The use of the $2 bill is popular among fans and alumni of Clemson University, who often bring notes with them when traveling to university athletic events in other localities as a demonstration of their economic impact in an area. The idea was first popularized in 1977 when Georgia Tech had threatened to no longer play the Tigers in football and has since caught on as a token of fandom when traveling to other locations. Fans will often stamp an orange tiger paw (Clemson's logo) on the note as a sign of its origin.

Circa 2019, some individuals have become "ambassadors" for the two-dollar bill in an effort to popularize its use in everyday transactions by using them as often as possible, adding large numbers of the notes into circulation in the process.

Use of the $2 bill is also being suggested by some gun rights activists to show support for Second Amendment rights, particularly at stores that allow open carry or concealed carry of weapons on their premises. Two-dollar notes have also seen increased usage in situations where tipping is encouraged, especially in gentlemen's clubs. This is due to the idea that tips will increase because of the ease of use of a single, higher-denomination bill as the lowest common note in use.

Many Asian communities that celebrate Lunar New Year use crisp $2 bills to gift money in red envelopes.

=== Incidents ===
The relative scarcity of the $2 bill in everyday circulation has occasionally led to confusion at points of sale, as well as negative reactions by merchants and even attempted prosecution of the individual trying to tender the bill.

In 2005, a man in Baltimore, Maryland, was jailed for attempting to use $2 bills that the store and local police incorrectly thought were counterfeit because of smeared ink on some of the bills.

In 2016, a 13-year-old girl in Texas was detained by police for attempting to use a $2 bill to pay for lunch in her school's cafeteria. The bill, a series 1953 red seal, was still legal tender but was old enough that the school's counterfeit banknote detection pen would not work on it. In 1960, the chemical properties of the paper used for United States currency were changed and a counterfeit detection pen is unable to prove whether or not a bill is genuine if the bill was printed prior to then.

== Uncut currency sheets ==
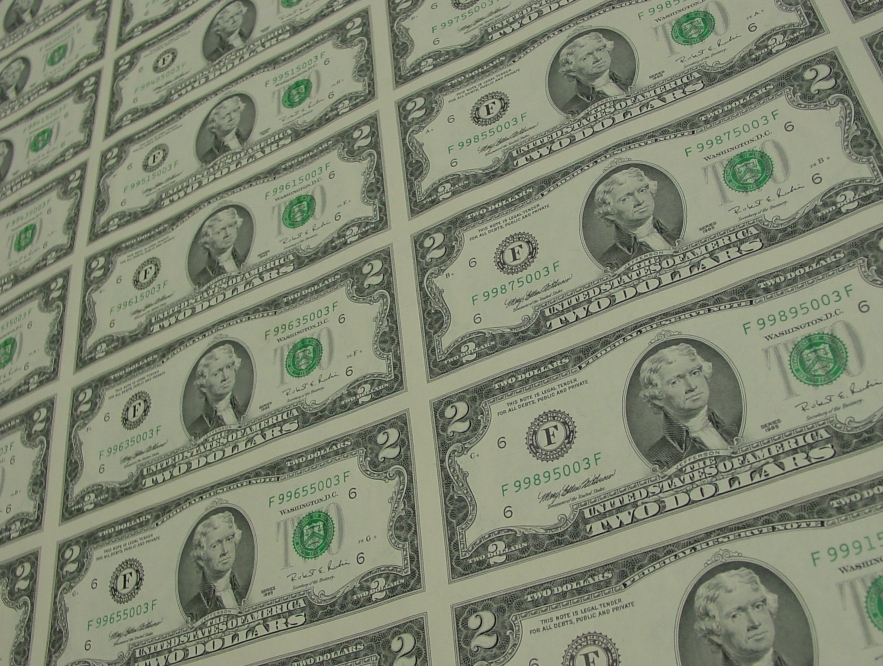
Uncut 32-subject sheet of series 1995 $2 Federal Reserve Notes.

Alongside other denominations, uncut currency sheets of $2 bills are available from the Bureau of Engraving and Printing. Some of the recent $2 uncut sheets from Series 1995 and Series 2003 have been collectibles as they come from special non-circulation printings. Most of the Series 1995 $2 uncut sheets had a higher suffix letter in the serial number than regular circulation $2 bills.

In late 1999, to celebrate the new millennium, a unique run of 9,999 Series 1995 $2 star notes were printed for all twelve Federal Reserve Banks; the initial printing of Series 1995 $2 notes for circulation was for the Atlanta district (F) only. Uncut $2 sheets from Series 2003 were printed for the Boston (A), New York (B), Atlanta (F), Chicago (G), Minneapolis (I), and Dallas (K) Federal Reserve districts; notes from the Minneapolis district were the only ones released for circulation. Uncut sheets of Series 2003A have also been produced, although in this case circulating currency for all twelve districts has also been made. All $2 notes beginning with Series 1995 have been printed in the BEP facility in Fort Worth, Texas, (indicated by "FW" preceding the face plate number on the obverse of the note). Uncut sheets of $2 bills are available in various sizes. A 32-subject sheet, which is the original-size sheet on which the notes are printed, is available. Other sheet sizes available have been cut from the original 32-subject sheet. These include half (sixteen-note), quarter (eight-note), and eighth (four-note) sheets for $2 bills. Uncut sheets are sold for more than their respective face values. Uncut sheets of large size notes (issued before 1928) also exist, but are extremely rare.

== See also ==
- Japanese 2000 yen banknote – another banknote denomination of roughly ten times the value that is similarly rarely seen in circulation and likewise available upon request from banks.
