= Treasury Note (1890–1891) =

American currency

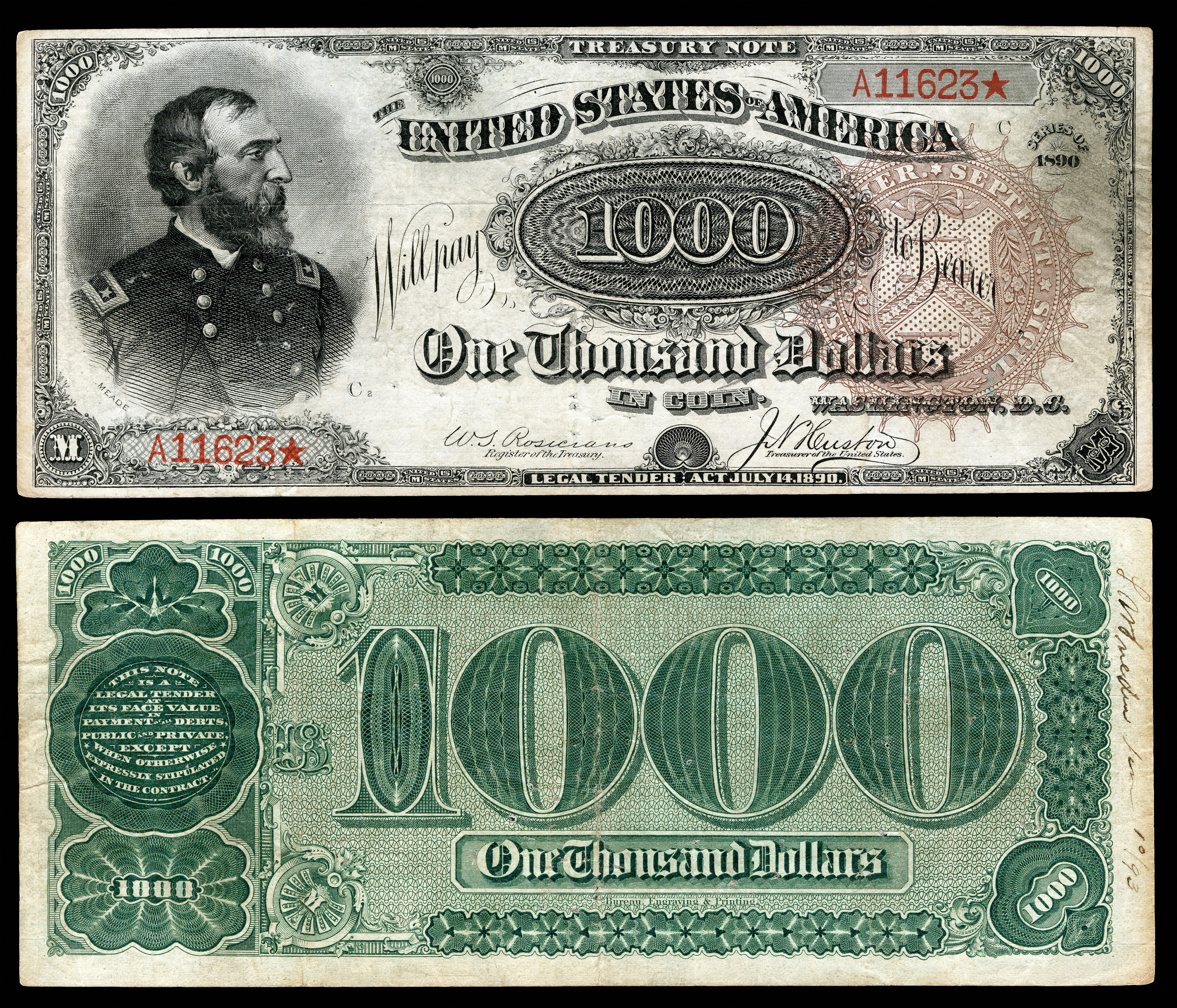
Series 1890 $1,000 Treasury Note, nicknamed "The Grand Watermelon" due to the shape and colour of the zeros on the reverse.

The Treasury Note (also known as a Coin Note) was a type of representative money issued by the United States government from 1890 until 1893 under authority of the Sherman Silver Purchase Act in denominations of $1, $2, $5, $10, $20, $50, $100 and $1,000. It was issued in two series: an 1890 series with $1, $2, $5, $10, $20, $100 and $1,000 denominations, and an 1891 series that added the $50 denomination. A $500 note was designed but never issued.

== Usage ==
The government issued the Treasury Note to individuals selling silver bullion to the Treasury. Unlike other redemption notes like silver and gold certificates (which stipulated whether the note was backed by and redeemable for silver or gold coin, respectively), Treasury Notes stipulated only that they were redeemable in coin. This allowed the Treasury to fulfil the note's obligation in silver coin, gold coin, or both, at its discretion when the note was redeemed. This flexibility allowed the Treasury some control over releasing gold or silver when the relative value of the two metals fluctuated. The origin of the term "Coin Note" to describe the note is unclear – it may refer either to the coin it could be exchanged for, or derive from the fact that it was issued to pay for silver that would later be turned into coins.

== Description ==
Treasury Notes are large-size (average dimension is 7.375 by 3.125 inches [187.3 by 79.4 millimetres]) banknotes. The portrait of General George Meade on the $1,000 Note was engraved by renowned artist and line engraver Charles Burt. The 100 Greatest American Currency Notes, a 2006 book by Q. David Bowers and David Sundman, put the $1,000 Treasury Note (Fr#379b), nicknamed the "Grand Watermelon", at the top of its list. Of the seven "Grand Watermelon" notes known to exist today, only three are available to collectors: two of the Large Brown Treasury Seal variety (Fr#379a), pictured above; and only one example of the Small Red Treasury Seal variety (Fr#379b).

A distinguishing feature of the Series 1890 notes (and one that greatly appeals to collectors) is the extremely ornate designs on the reverse side of the notes. The intent of this was to make counterfeiting much more difficult, but opponents of the design argued that the extensive detail would make it more difficult to distinguish between genuine and counterfeit notes. Consequently, the reverse designs were simplified on the Series 1891 Treasury Notes issued the following year.

== Auction history ==
On January 10, 2014, at the annual Florida United Numismatist convention, in Orlando, Florida, Heritage Auctions sold a Series 1890 $1,000 Treasury Note (Fr#379b) for $3,290,000, setting a new world record price for paper currency. The same note had set a record in December 2006 when it was sold for $2,255,000 in a private sale. The note was previously auctioned in 1944 for $1,230 and in 1970 for $11,000.

The other variety of $1,000 Treasury Notes, Series 1891 "Open Backs" (Fr#379c), represented by just two notes, has also been involved in the recent string of record-breaking sales. While one of these two notes is owned by the Smithsonian Institution (pictured at bottom), the only Series 1891 $1,000 note available to collectors had set the world record in March 2006. It again set the record in April 2013, when it was sold at public auction by Heritage Auctions for $2,585,000 at the Central States Numismatic Convention, in Chicago, Illinois.

== Gallery of Treasury Note images ==
The Treasury Notes pictured below are from the 1890 and 1891 series. Images are from the National Numismatic Collection at the National Museum of American History (Smithsonian Institution).

Complete type set of 1890/1891 Treasury Notes
Value	Series	Fr. (Note: "Fr" numbers refer to the numbering system in the widely used Friedberg reference book. These reference numbers indicate varieties existing within a larger type design based on (among other things) variations in design, seal type, Treasury signature combinations, etc. .)	Image	Portrait	Classification/variety
$1	1890	Fr.347		Edwin Stanton	347 – Rosecrans and Huston – large brown. 348 – Rosecrans and Nebecker – large brown. 349 – Rosecrans and Nebecker – small red.
$1	1891	Fr.351		Edwin Stanton	350 – Rosecrans and Nebecker – small red. 351 – Tillman and Morgan – small red. 352 – Bruce and Roberts – small red.
$2	1890	Fr.353		James McPherson	353 – Rosecrans and Huston – large brown.; 354 – Rosecrans and Nebecker – large brown.; 355 – Rosecrans and Nebecker – small red.
$2	1891	Fr.357		James McPherson	356 – Rosecrans and Nebecker – small red.; 357 – Tillman and Morgan – small red.; 358 – Bruce and Roberts – small red.
$5	1890	Fr.361		George H. Thomas	359 – Rosecrans and Huston – large brown.; 360 – Rosecrans and Nebecker – large brown.; 361 – Rosecrans and Nebecker – small red.
$5	1891	Fr.365		George H. Thomas	362 – Rosecrans and Nebecker – small red.; 363 – Tillman and Morgan – small red.; 364 – Bruce and Roberts – small red.; 365 – Lyons and Roberts – small red.
$10	1890	Fr.367		Philip Sheridan	366 – Rosecrans and Huston – large brown.; 367 – Rosecrans and Nebecker – large brown.; 368 – Rosecrans and Nebecker – small red.
$10	1891	Fr.371		Philip Sheridan	369 – Rosecrans and Nebecker – small red.; 370 – Tillman and Morgan – small red.; 371 – Bruce and Roberts – small red.
$20	1890	Fr.374		John Marshall	372 – Rosecrans and Huston – large brown.; 373 – Rosecrans and Nebecker – large brown.; 374 – Rosecrans and Nebecker – small red.
$20	1891	Fr.375a		John Marshall	375 – Tillman and Morgan – small red. 375a – Bruce and Roberts – small red.
$50	1891	Fr.376		William Seward	376 – Rosecrans and Nebecker – small red.
$100	1890	Fr.377		David Farragut	377 – Rosecrans and Huston – large brown.
$100	1891	Fr.378		David Farragut	378 – Rosecrans and Nebecker – small red.
$500	1891			William Tecumseh Sherman	379 – Bruce and Roberts – small red.
$1,000	1890	Fr.379a		George Meade	379a – Rosecrans and Huston – large brown.
$1,000	1890	Fr.379b		George Meade	*379b - Rosecrans and Nebecker - small red
$1,000	1891	Fr.379c		George Meade	379c – Tillman and Morgan – small red.; 379d – Rosecrans and Nebecker – small red.
