= 1898 Connecticut gubernatorial election =

- November 8, 1898
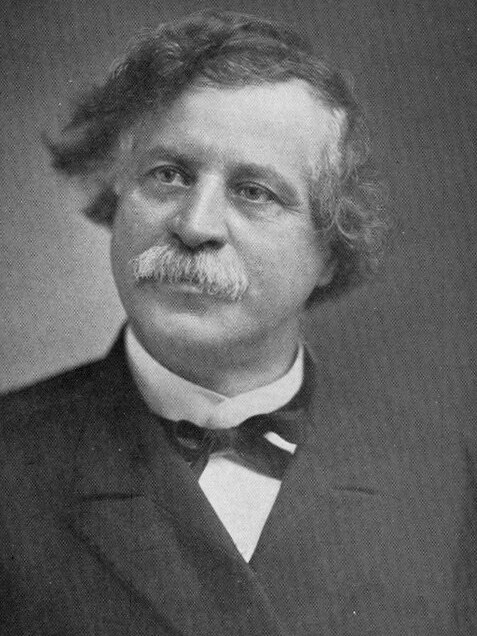

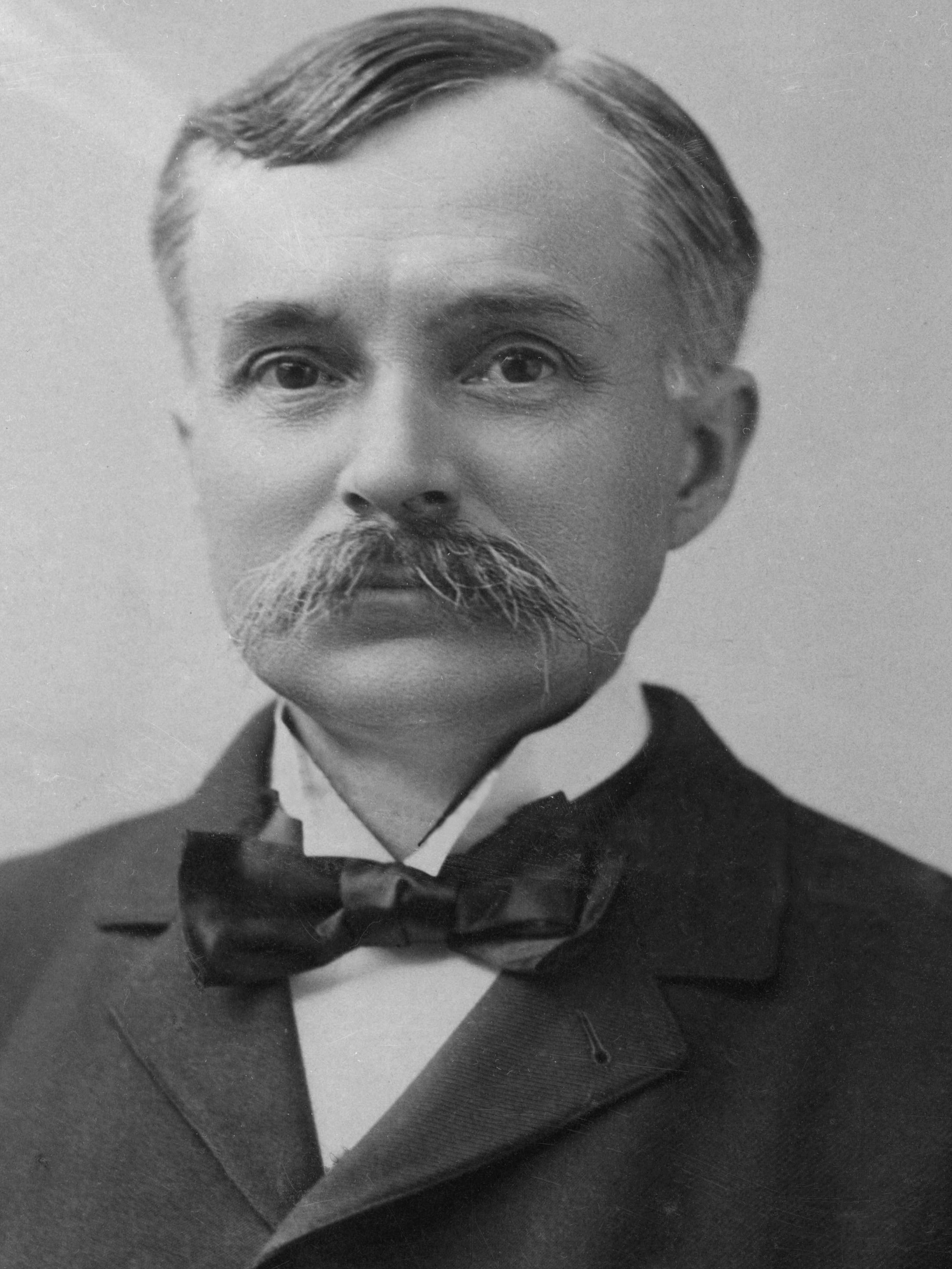
Nominee	George E. Lounsbury	Daniel N. Morgan
Party	Republican	Democratic
Popular vote	81,015	64,227
Percentage	54.17%	42.94%
- Lounsbury: 40–50% 50–60% 60–70% 70–80% 80–90% Morgan: 40–50% 50–60% 60–70% 70–80%
Governor before election
Lorrin A. Cooke
Republican
Elected Governor
George E. Lounsbury
Republican

The 1898 Connecticut gubernatorial election was held on November 8, 1898. Republican nominee George E. Lounsbury defeated Democratic nominee Daniel N. Morgan with 54.17% of the vote.

== General election ==
=== Candidates ===
Major party candidates

- George E. Lounsbury, Republican
- Daniel N. Morgan, Democratic

Other candidates

- Charles Stodel, Socialist Labor
- Charles E. Steele, Prohibition

=== Results ===
1898 Connecticut gubernatorial election
Party	Candidate	Votes	%	±%
Republican	George E. Lounsbury	81,015	54.17%	
Democratic	Daniel N. Morgan	64,227	42.94%	
Socialist Labor	Charles Stodel	2,866	1.92%	
Prohibition	Charles E. Steele	1,460	0.98%	
Majority		16,788		
Turnout				
Republican hold		Swing		
