= Uncut currency sheet =

Numismatics collector's items

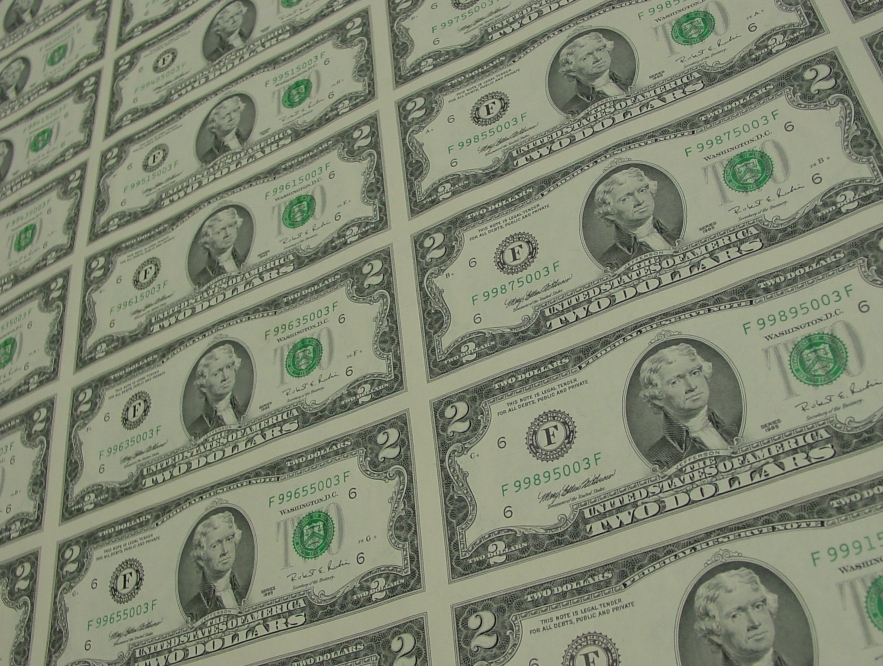
Uncut sheet of two-dollar bills

Uncut currency sheets are common numismatics collector's items. They are often sold as souvenirs by issuers. After cutting, usually the banknotes can be used as legal tender; however, the cost to purchase uncut currency sheets is typically higher than the aggregate face value of the cut notes.

== United States dollar ==
The Bureau of Engraving and Printing (BEP) has been selling uncut sheets of United States dollars since October 26, 1981. Uncut American paper money issued prior to that is a rarity.

As of January 2026, the U.S. Mint's online store offers uncut sheets of $1, $2, $5, $10, $50 notes.
