= George A. Bagley =

American politician

George Augustus Bagley
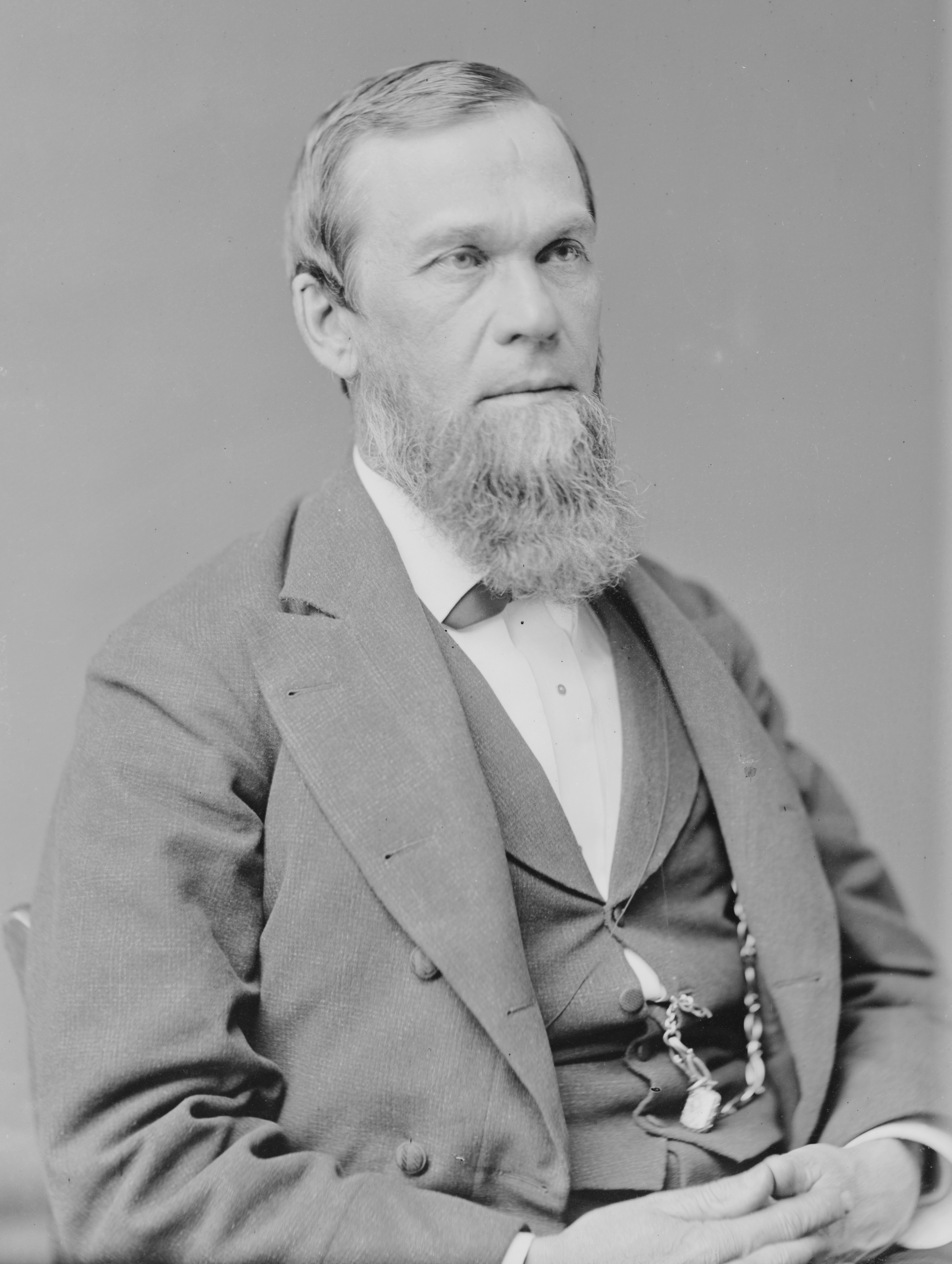

Member of the U.S. House of Representatives from New York's 22nd district
- In office March 4, 1875 – March 3, 1879
- Preceded by: Ellis H. Roberts
- Succeeded by: Warner Miller

Personal details
- Born: July 22, 1826 Watertown, New York, U.S.
- Died: May 12, 1915 (aged 88) Watertown, New York, U.S.
- Party: Republican
- Spouse: Sabine Pauline Bagley
- Children: 5
- Profession: Lawyer, iron manufacturer

George Augustus Bagley (July 22, 1826 – May 12, 1915) was an American politician and a United States representative from New York.

== Biography ==
Born in Watertown, Jefferson County, Bagley received an academic training, studied law, was admitted to the bar in New York in 1847 and commenced practice in Watertown. He married Sabine Pauline and they had five children, one of whom died in infancy.

== Career ==
Bagley continued the practice of his profession in Watertown until his retirement in 1853 to engage in the manufacture of iron. He was president of the village of Watertown in 1866, and town supervisor from 1865 to 1868.

Elected as a Republican, Bagley was U.S. Representative for the twenty-second district of New York to the Forty-fourth and Forty-fifth Congresses. He was in office from March 4, 1875, to March 3, 1879. He resumed the manufacture of iron until his death in 1915.

== Death ==
Bagley died on May 12, 1915. He is buried at Brookside Cemetery in Watertown.

U.S. House of Representatives
| Preceded by Ellis H. Roberts | Representative of the 22nd Congressional District of New York; March 4, 1875 – March 3, 1879 | Succeeded by Warner Miller |
