= Ralph W. Sturges =

Native American chief

- Born: December 25, 1918; New London, Connecticut
- Died: October 1, 2007 (aged 88); New London, Connecticut
- Other name: G’tinemong
- Citizenship: Mohegan

Ralph Weston Sturges (December 25, 1918 – October 1, 2007) was an American Mohegan tribal chief who served as the 17th chief and who helped gain federal recognition for the Mohegan people of Connecticut in 1994. He also helped to found and build Connecticut's Mohegan Sun Casino. He held the title of "chief for life."

The Mohegan tribe, which is based in Montville, Connecticut, is currently made up of approximately 1,700 people. The Mohegan's reservation is located in eastern Connecticut along the Thames River near the town of Uncasville. The Mohegans are one of the wealthiest tribes in the United States, thanks to income from casinos and other facilities, whose construction was spearheaded by Sturges.

== Personal life ==
Sturges was born December 25, 1918, in New London, Connecticut. He traced his Mohegan ancestry to his maternal great-grandmother, Emma Baker, a Mohegan medicine woman and early 1900s Native American activist who campaigned for the state to settle Mohegan land grievances.

He served in the U.S. military in an intelligence division in New Guinea and the Philippines. He was awarded a Bronze Star for his service in the war.

Sturges worked in a number of professions before becoming active in Mohegan tribal affairs late in life. He worked as a disaster relief coordinator for the Salvation Army and a payroll deliveryman for an armored car company, among other jobs.

He was a skilled and active marble sculptor. His works were placed on display at the Connecticut State Capitol and other public buildings. Connecticut Governor M. Jodi Rell issued a statement following Sturges' death in 2007 saying, "He will be forever remembered for his contributions not only as a wise leader ... but as a skilled sculptor."

Sturges was succeed as chief by Lynn Malerba in 2010.
