= Lynn Malerba =

American tribal leader and nurse (born 1953)

Marilynn Malerba
- Mutáwi Mutáhash
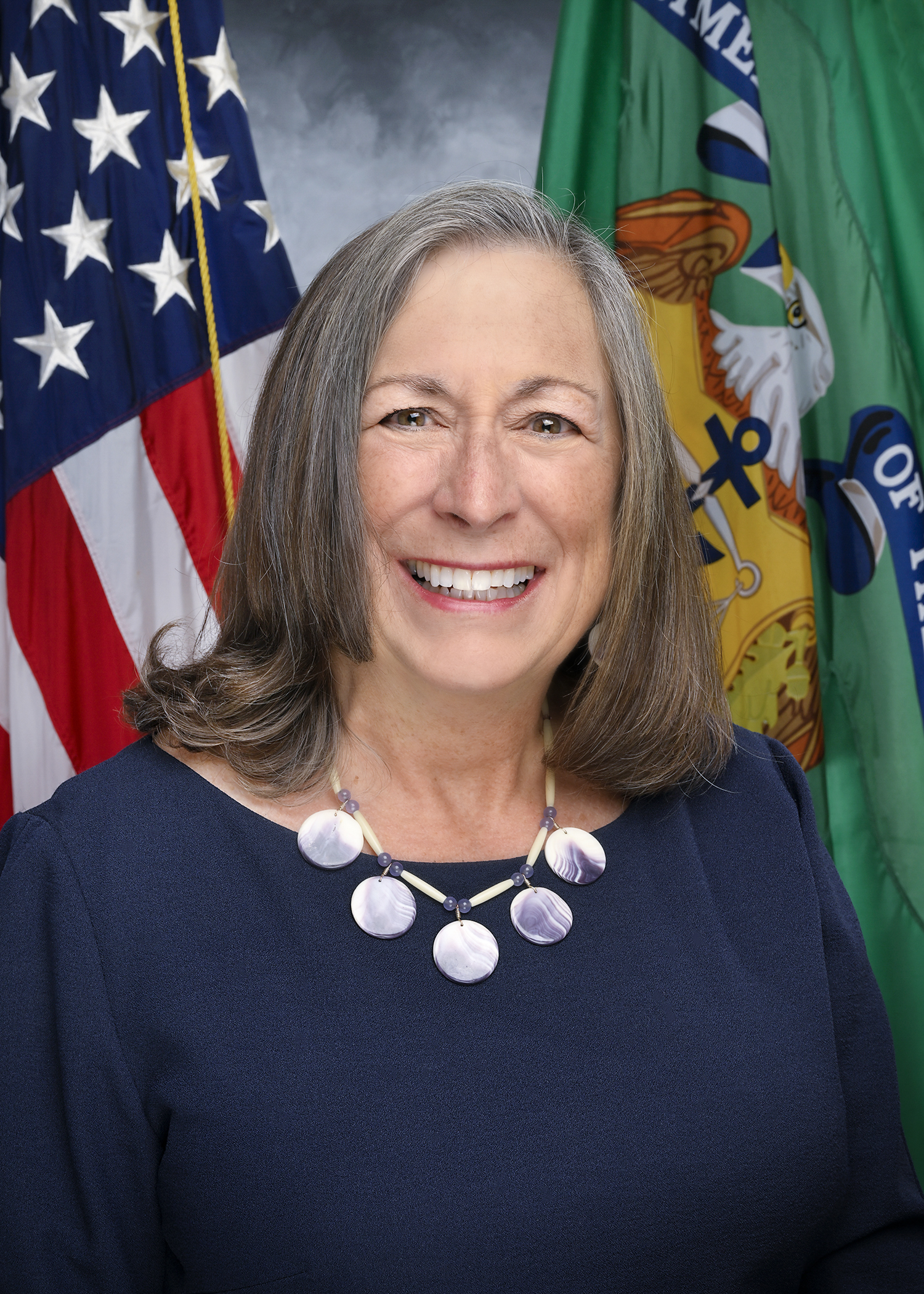

45th Treasurer of the United States
- In office September 12, 2022 – November 15, 2024
- President: Joe Biden
- Preceded by: Jovita Carranza
- Succeeded by: Brandon Beach

18th Chief of the Mohegan Tribe
- Incumbent
- Assumed office August 15, 2010
- Preceded by: Ralph W. Sturges

Personal details
- Born: August 17, 1953 (age 73)
- Education: St. Joseph's College (BS); University of Connecticut (MPA); Yale University (DNP)
- Website: Mohegan Tribe website

Marilynn Roberge Malerba (Mohegan-Pequot: Mutáwi Mutáhash, lit. 'Many Hearts'; born August 17, 1953) is an American public official who serves as the lifetime chief of the Mohegan Tribe, a federally recognized Native American tribe based in Connecticut. She served as the 45th treasurer of the United States from 2022 to 2024, becoming the first Native American to hold that office. A former healthcare executive and registered nurse, Malerba has played a prominent role in tribal governance, federal-tribal relations, and public health leadership.

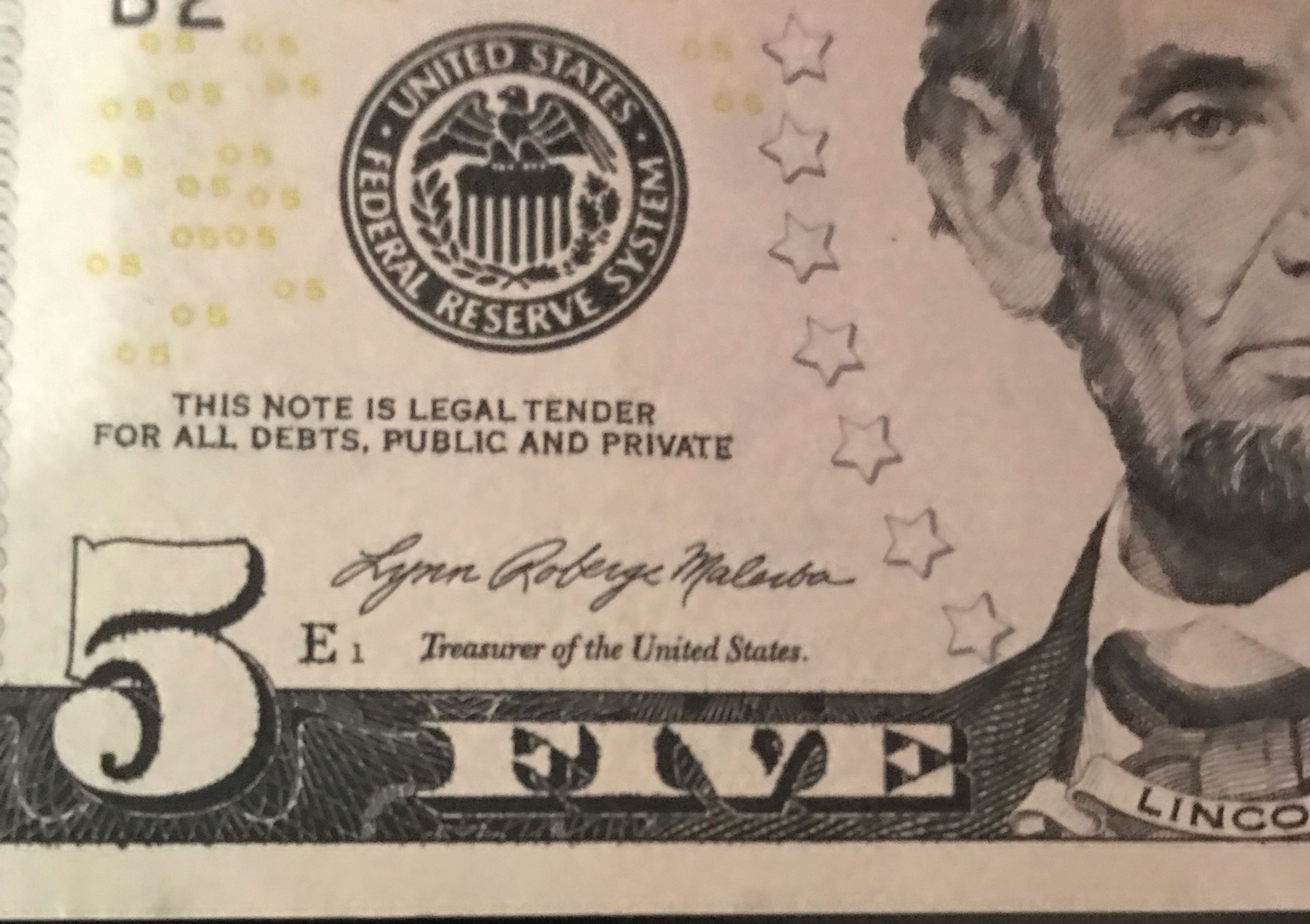
A close-up of a United States five-dollar bill featuring Malerba's signature.

== Early life and education ==
Malerba was raised in Uncasville, Connecticut, and comes from a family deeply rooted in Mohegan leadership and tradition, Her mother holds the ceremonial title of Tribal Nonner, a respected elder woman within the Mohegan Tribe, and her great-grandfather, Chief Matagha (Burrill Fielding), served as tribal chief from 1937 until his death in 1952.

After growing up in Uncasville, Connecticut, Malerba studied nursing at Hartford Hospital College of Nursing, and then earned a Bachelor of Science from St. Joseph's College (now known as the University of Saint Joseph) in West Hartford, in 1983. She later earned a Master of Public Administration from the University of Connecticut and a Doctor of Nursing Practice from Yale University.

== Career ==
Malerba began her nursing career at Hartford Hospital before joining Lawrence + Memorial Hospital in New London, Connecticut, where she advanced to lead the cardiology and pulmonary services departments. Her experience in healthcare management laid a foundation for her later roles in tribal governance and public health advocacy.

Within the Mohegan Tribe, Malerba has held multiple leadership positions, including chairperson of the tribal council and executive director of the tribe's Health and Human Services Department. On August 15, 2010, she was unanimously selected as the 18th lifetime chief of the Mohegan Tribe, becoming the first woman in modern history to hold this role. As chief, she has been a vocal advocate for tribal sovereignty, cultural preservation, and economic development.

Malerba's influence extends beyond her tribe. She has served on the United States Department of Justice Tribal Nations Leadership Council and joined the Indian Health Service's Tribal Advisory Committee in 2015, where she was appointed chair in 2022 In these roles, she has contributed to shaping policies that address Native American health and justice issues at the federal level.

On June 21, 2022, President Joe Biden nominated Malerba to serve as Treasurer of the United States. She was confirmed and sworn in on September 12, 2022, becoming the first Native American to hold this office. Her appointment ended the longest vacancy in the position's history, which had lasted over two and a half years. During her tenure, Malerba and Treasury Secretary Janet Yellen became the first two women to have their signatures together on U.S. currency.

== Personal life ==
Malerba is married to Paul Malerba; they are the parents of two adult daughters, Elizabeth and Angela. They have three grandchildren.

== Awards and honors ==
Malerba has honorary doctoral degrees from Eastern Connecticut State University and the University of Saint Joseph.

== Selected publications ==
- Malerba, Marilynn (2013). "The Effects of Sequestration on Indian Health". Hastings Center Report. 43 (6): 17–21. doi:10.1002/hast.229. ISSN 0093-0334. PMID 24249470.
- Malerba, Marilynn; Moss, Margaret P. (2016). "Indian Health Funding: Time for Change". In Moss, Margaret P. (ed.). American Indian health and nursing. Springer. ISBN 978-1-78684-813-0. OCLC 1249948373.
- Malerba, Marilynn (2016). "Northeastern Woodlands". In Moss, Margaret P. (ed.). American Indian health and nursing. Springer. ISBN 978-1-78684-813-0. OCLC 1249948373.

== See also ==
- Native American women in politics

Political offices
Preceded by Jovita Carranza	Treasurer of the United States; 2022–2024	Succeeded by Brandon Beach
