= Treasurer of the United States =

Officer in the United States Department of the Treasury

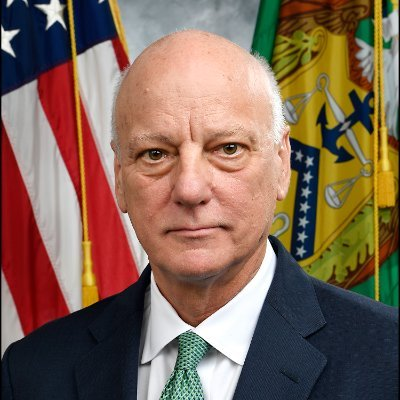
- Incumbent; Brandon Beach since May 28, 2025
- United States Department of the Treasury
- Reports to: United States Secretary of the Treasury; United States Deputy Secretary of the Treasury
- Seat: Treasury Building; Washington, D.C., U.S.
- Appointer: President of the United States
- Term length: No fixed term
- Formation: May 14, 1777; 249 years ago
- First holder: Michael Hillegas
- Website: home.treasury.gov/about/offices/treasurer

The treasurer of the United States is an officer in the United States Department of the Treasury who serves as the custodian and trustee of the federal government's collateral assets and the supervisor of the department's currency and coinage production functions. On March 23, 2025, Donald Trump named Georgia state senator Brandon Beach—breaking a 76-year streak of women holding the position—to be the next treasurer. He was formally appointed on May 28, 2025.

== Responsibilities ==
By law, the treasurer is the depositary officer of the United States with regard to deposits of gold, special drawing rights, and financial gifts to the Library of Congress. The treasurer also directly oversees the Bureau of Engraving and Printing (BEP) and the United States Mint, which respectively print and mint U.S. currency and coinage. In connection to the influence of federal monetary policy on currency and coinage production, the treasurer liaises on a regular basis with the Federal Reserve.

The duty perhaps most widely associated with the treasurer of the United States is affixing a facsimile signature to all Federal Reserve Notes. Federal law requires both the treasurer's signature and the treasury secretary's countersignature for Federal Reserve notes to be considered legal tender.

Moreover, the treasurer serves as a senior advisor and representative of the Treasury Department on behalf of the secretary in the areas of community development and public engagement.

== History ==
=== Creation ===
On July 29, 1775, long before the Department of the Treasury ever existed, the Second Continental Congress established the Treasury Office to manage revolutionary wartime finances. Congress chose George Clymer and Michael Hillegas as joint treasurers of the United Colonies. On August 6, 1776, however, Clymer resigned from his post, thus making Hillegas the sole incumbent. The position received its current name on May 14, 1777, while Hillegas was still in office.

=== Change in functions over the years ===
The post of U.S. treasurer predates the United States Constitution. The treasurer was originally charged with the receipt and custody of all government funds independent of the treasury secretary, not unlike today's elected state treasurers. Beginning in 1939, the Office of the Treasurer and its cash management activities were brought under the direction of a broader Fiscal Service, one that also coordinated governmentwide accounting and debt management. Later in 1974, the cash management function in its entirety was transferred from the treasurer to what is now known as the Bureau of the Fiscal Service as a cost-saving measure. Responsibility for oversight of the Bureau of Engraving and Printing (BEP) and the United States Mint was later assigned to the treasurer in 1981. In 1994, the treasurer was also named National Honorary Director of the U.S. Savings Bonds Campaign and therefore assigned the task of promoting - as opposed to managing - the program.

More recently, the requirement of the United States Senate confirmation for the appointment was dropped in August 2012.

Since the appointment of Georgia Neese Clark Gray in 1949, the non-continuous total length of time the office has been vacant is more than 4,750 days, or thirteen years, while in the 170+ years prior to that, such time totaled less than a year.

=== Female officeholders ===
Between 1949 and 2025, 17 women held the position of the office of treasurer. Georgia Neese Clark Gray became treasurer on June 21, 1949, making her the first woman to hold the office. Until Trump's appointment of Brandon Beach to the position in 2025, all subsequent treasurers were women, and several of those women have also been Hispanic, starting with Romana Acosta Bañuelos in 1971. Marilynn Malerba, of the Mohegan, became the first Native American treasurer in 2022.

== List of treasurers ==
The following persons served as treasurers of the United States:

No.	Name	Term of office	Refs.	President(s) served under
1	Michael Hillegas	July 29, 1775 – September 11, 1789 (14 years, 44 days)		George Washington (also served under Confederation Congress)
1	Hillegas served jointly with George Clymer until August 6, 1776. The title of the office was "Treasurer of the United Colonies" until May 14, 1777.			
2	Samuel Meredith	September 11, 1789 – December 1, 1801 (12 years, 81 days)		George Washington; John Adams; Thomas Jefferson
3	Thomas T. Tucker	December 1, 1801 – May 2, 1828 (26 years, 153 days) (served the longest term)		Thomas Jefferson; James Madison; James Monroe; John Quincy Adams
33 days vacant
4	William Clark	June 4, 1828 – May 26, 1829 (356 days)		John Quincy Adams; Andrew Jackson
5	John Campbell	May 26, 1829 – July 20, 1839 (10 years, 55 days)		Andrew Jackson; Martin Van Buren
2 days vacant
6	William Selden	July 22, 1839 – November 23, 1850 (11 years, 124 days) (served under the most presidents)		Martin Van Buren; William Henry Harrison; John Tyler; James K. Polk; Zachary Taylor; Millard Fillmore
4 days vacant
7	John Sloane	November 27, 1850 – April 1, 1853 (2 years, 125 days)		Millard Fillmore; Franklin Pierce
3 days vacant
8	Samuel L. Casey	April 4, 1853 – December 22, 1859 (6 years, 262 days)		Franklin Pierce; James Buchanan
68 days vacant
9	William C. Price	February 28, 1860 – March 21, 1861 (1 year, 21 days)		James Buchanan; Abraham Lincoln
10	Francis E. Spinner	March 16, 1861 – July 30, 1875 (14 years, 136 days)		Abraham Lincoln; Andrew Johnson; Ulysses S. Grant
11	John C. New	June 30, 1875 – July 1, 1876 (1 year, 1 day)		Ulysses S. Grant
12	A. U. Wyman	July 1, 1876 – June 30, 1877 (364 days)		Ulysses S. Grant; Rutherford B. Hayes
13	James Gilfillan	July 1, 1877 – March 31, 1883 (5 years, 273 days)		Rutherford B. Hayes; James A. Garfield; Chester A. Arthur
14	A. U. Wyman	April 1, 1883 – April 30, 1885 (2 years, 29 days)		Chester A. Arthur; Grover Cleveland
15	Conrad N. Jordan	May 1, 1885 – March 23, 1887 (1 year, 326 days)		Grover Cleveland
62 days vacant
16	James W. Hyatt	May 24, 1887 – May 10, 1889 (1 year, 351 days)		Grover Cleveland; Benjamin Harrison
17	James N. Huston	May 11, 1889 – April 24, 1891 (1 year, 348 days)		Benjamin Harrison
18	Enos H. Nebeker	April 25, 1891 – May 31, 1893 (2 years, 36 days)		Benjamin Harrison; Grover Cleveland
19	Daniel N. Morgan	June 1, 1893 – June 30, 1897 (4 years, 29 days)		Grover Cleveland; William McKinley
20	Ellis H. Roberts	July 1, 1897 – June 30, 1905 (7 years, 364 days)		William McKinley; Theodore Roosevelt
21	Charles H. Treat	July 1, 1905 – October 30, 1909 (4 years, 121 days)		Theodore Roosevelt; William Howard Taft
22	Lee McClung	November 1, 1909 – November 21, 1912 (3 years, 20 days)		William Howard Taft
23	Carmi A. Thompson	November 22, 1912 – March 31, 1913 (129 days) (served the shortest term)		William Howard Taft; Woodrow Wilson
24	John Burke	April 1, 1913 – January 5, 1921 (7 years, 279 days)		Woodrow Wilson
117 days vacant
25	Frank White	May 2, 1921 – May 1, 1928 (6 years, 365 days)		Warren G. Harding; Calvin Coolidge
30 days vacant
26	Harold Theodore Tate	May 31, 1928 – January 17, 1929 (231 days)		Calvin Coolidge
27	W. O. Woods	January 18, 1929 – May 31, 1933 (4 years, 133 days)		Calvin Coolidge; Herbert Hoover; Franklin Delano Roosevelt
28	William Alexander Julian	June 1, 1933 – May 29, 1949 (15 years, 362 days)		Franklin D. Roosevelt; Harry S. Truman
23 days vacant
29	Georgia Neese Clark	June 21, 1949 – January 27, 1953 (3 years, 220 days)		Harry S. Truman; Dwight D. Eisenhower
30	Ivy Baker Priest	January 28, 1953 – January 29, 1961 (8 years, 1 day)		Dwight D. Eisenhower; John F. Kennedy
31	Elizabeth Rudel Smith	January 30, 1961 – April 13, 1962 (1 year, 73 days)		John F. Kennedy
265 days vacant
32	Kathryn O'Hay Granahan	January 3, 1963 – November 22, 1966 (3 years, 323 days)		John F. Kennedy; Lyndon B. Johnson
898 days vacant
33	Dorothy Andrews Elston Kabis	May 8, 1969 – July 3, 1971 (2 years, 56 days)		Richard Nixon
167 days vacant
34	Romana Acosta Bañuelos	December 17, 1971 – February 14, 1974 (2 years, 59 days)		Richard Nixon
127 days vacant
35	Francine Irving Neff	June 21, 1974 – January 19, 1977 (2 years, 212 days)		Richard Nixon; Gerald Ford
236 days vacant
36	Azie Taylor Morton	September 12, 1977 – January 20, 1981 (3 years, 130 days)		Jimmy Carter
56 days vacant
37	Angela Marie Buchanan	March 17, 1981 – July 5, 1983 (2 years, 110 days)		Ronald Reagan
79 days vacant
38	Katherine D. Ortega	September 22, 1983 – July 1, 1989 (5 years, 282 days)		Ronald Reagan; George H. W. Bush
163 days vacant
39	Catalina Vasquez Villalpando	December 11, 1989 – January 20, 1993 (3 years, 40 days)		George H. W. Bush
405 days vacant
40	Mary Ellen Withrow	March 1, 1994 – January 20, 2001 (6 years, 325 days)		Bill Clinton
208 days vacant
41	Rosario Marin	August 16, 2001 – June 30, 2003 (1 year, 318 days)		George W. Bush
569 days vacant
42	Anna Escobedo Cabral	January 19, 2005 – January 20, 2009 (4 years, 1 day)		George W. Bush
198 days vacant
43	Rosa Gumataotao Rios	August 6, 2009 – July 11, 2016 (6 years, 340 days)		Barack Obama
343 days vacant
44	Jovita Carranza	June 19, 2017 – January 14, 2020 (2 years, 209 days)		Donald Trump
972 days vacant
45	Marilynn Malerba	September 12, 2022 – November 15, 2024 (2 years, 64 days)		Joe Biden
–	Patricia Collins (acting)	November 16, 2024 – May 28, 2025 (193 days)		Donald Trump
46	Brandon Beach	May 28, 2025 – Present (1 year, 177 days)		Donald Trump

== See also ==
- Register of the Treasury
