= Enos H. Nebeker =

American politician

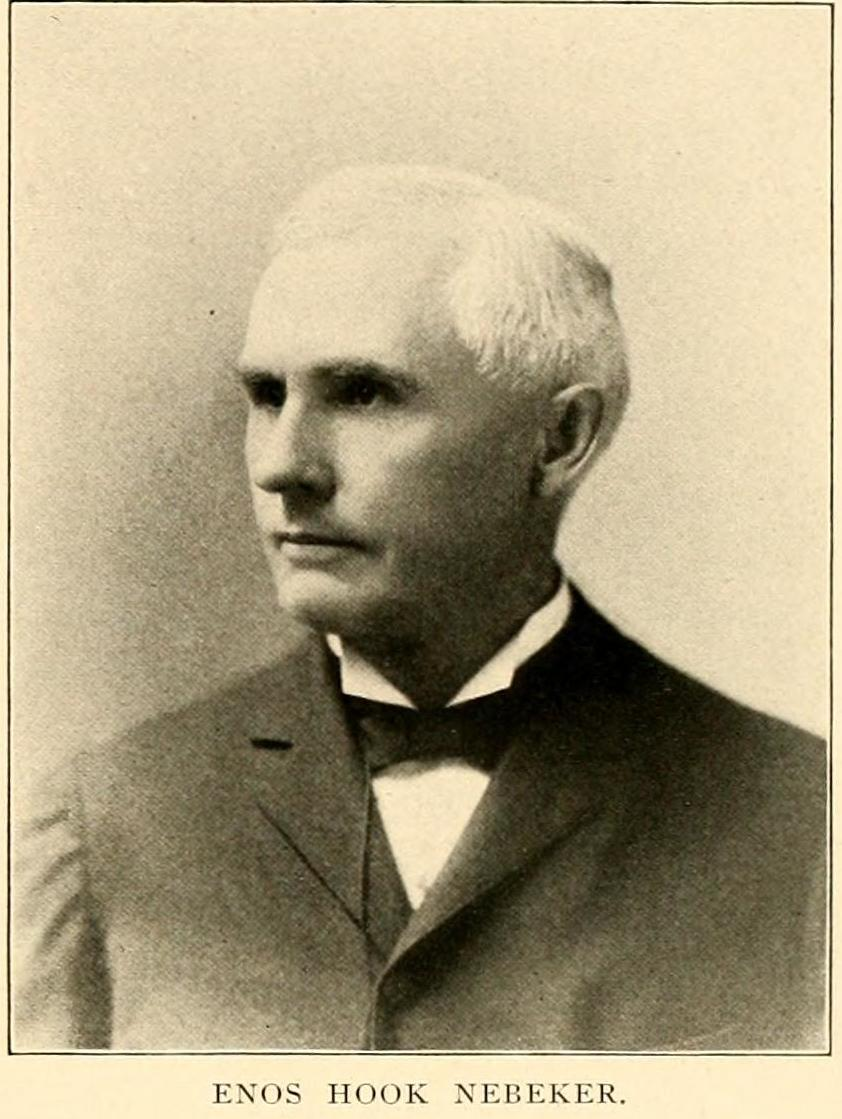

18th Treasurer of the United States
- In office April 25, 1891 – May 31, 1893
- President: Benjamin Harrison; Grover Cleveland
- Preceded by: James N. Huston
- Succeeded by: Daniel N. Morgan

Personal details
- Born: June 26, 1836 Covington, Indiana, U.S.
- Died: January 6, 1913 (aged 76) Covington, Indiana, U.S.
- Education: Asbury University
- Occupation: banker
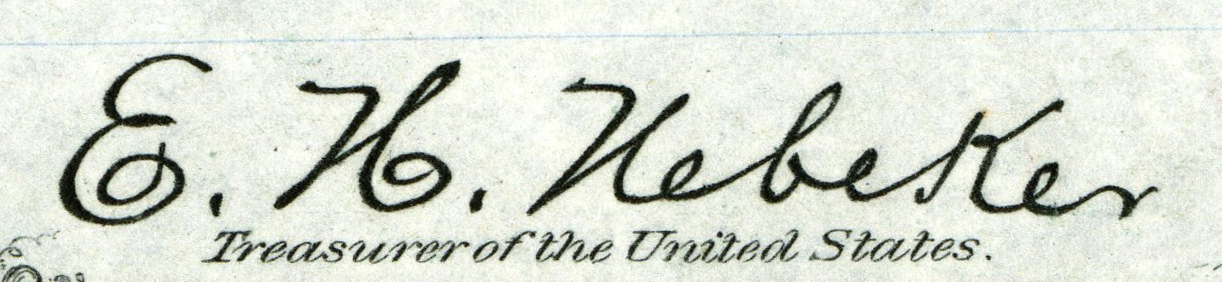
- Signature

Enos H. Nebeker (June 26, 1836 – January 6, 1913) was an American banker who was Treasurer of the United States from 1891 to 1893.

== Biography ==
Enos Hook Nebeker was born in Covington, Indiana on June 26, 1836. His parents had moved there from Piqua, Ohio. His father was a country banker and farmer and was active in the Whig, and later the Republican, parties. Enos received a common school education and studied for a year at Asbury University (now DePauw University). He then returned home to work with his father.

Nebeker was elected Auditor of Fountain County, Indiana in 1870 and held that office for four years. He was a delegate to the 1880 Republican National Convention, where he supported James G. Blaine, and, after Blaine's elimination, James A. Garfield.

He later campaigned for Benjamin Harrison. In 1891, President Harrison named Nebeker Treasurer of the United States, with Nebeker holding office from April 25, 1891, to May 31, 1893.

Nebeker died in Covington on January 6, 1913.

== Personal life ==
Nebeker married Mary E. Sewell in 1865. They had two children, Grace Nebeker and Sewell Nebeker (who served as his secretary during his term as Treasurer).

Government offices
Preceded by James N. Huston	Treasurer of the United States; April 25, 1891 – May 31, 1893	Succeeded by Daniel N. Morgan
