= James N. Huston =

American politician

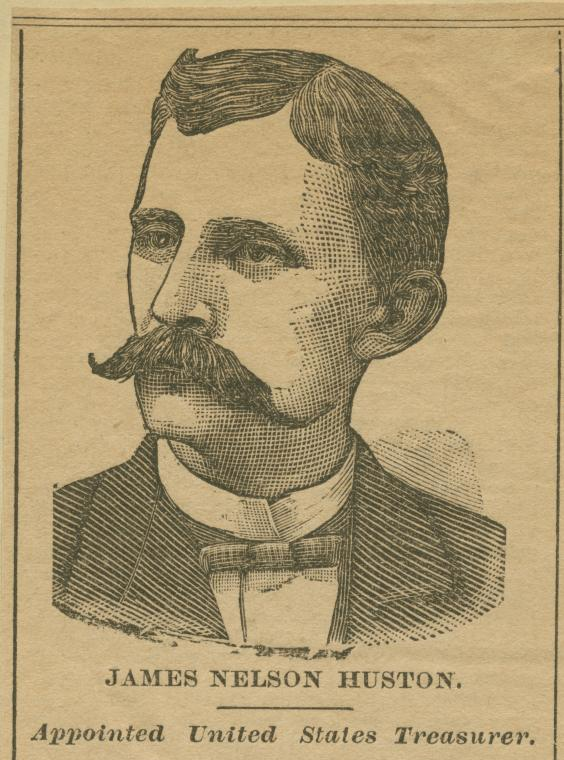

17th Treasurer of the United States
- In office May 11, 1889 – April 24, 1891
- President: Benjamin Harrison
- Preceded by: James W. Hyatt
- Succeeded by: Enos H. Nebecker

Personal details
- Born: 1849 Greencastle, Pennsylvania, U.S.
- Died: 1927 (c. aged 78)
- Party: Republican
- Occupation: banker, businessman, politician
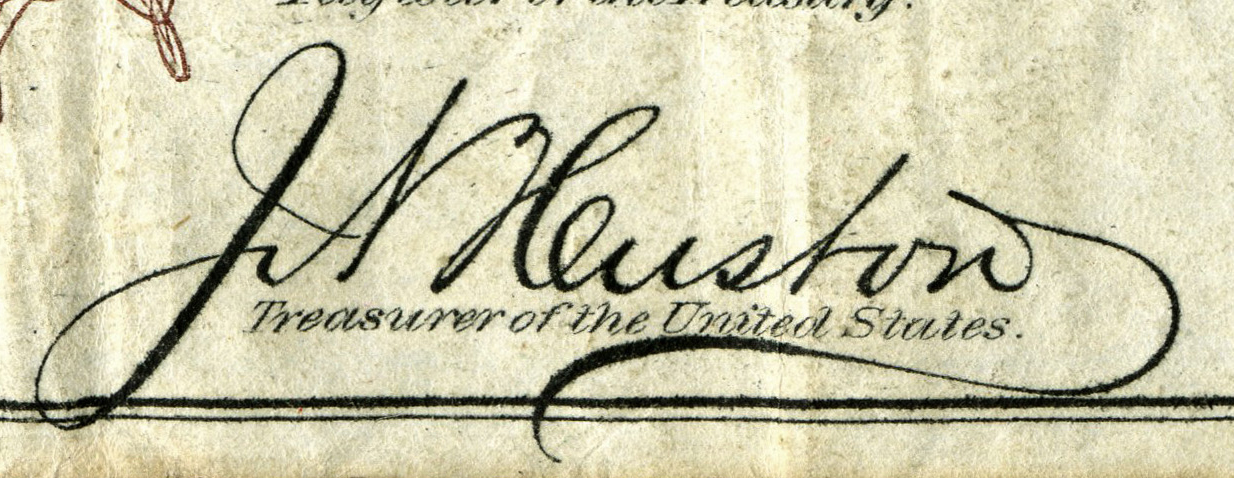
- Signature

James Nelson Huston (1849–1927) was a United States banker, businessman, and politician who served as Treasurer of the United States from 1889 to 1891.

== Biography ==
James N. Huston was born in Greencastle, Pennsylvania in 1849, the son of William Huston (1801–1875) and his wife, Isabella E. (Duncan) Huston. In 1851, his father settled in Connersville, Indiana and in 1870 was one of the co-founders of a local bank known as the Citizens' Bank. William Huston amassed a large fortune that he left to James at his death on January 5, 1875. He became the owner of the Citizens Bank at that time. He would later get into a number of businesses, including coffins, milling, silver plating, buggies, hosiery, and gas.

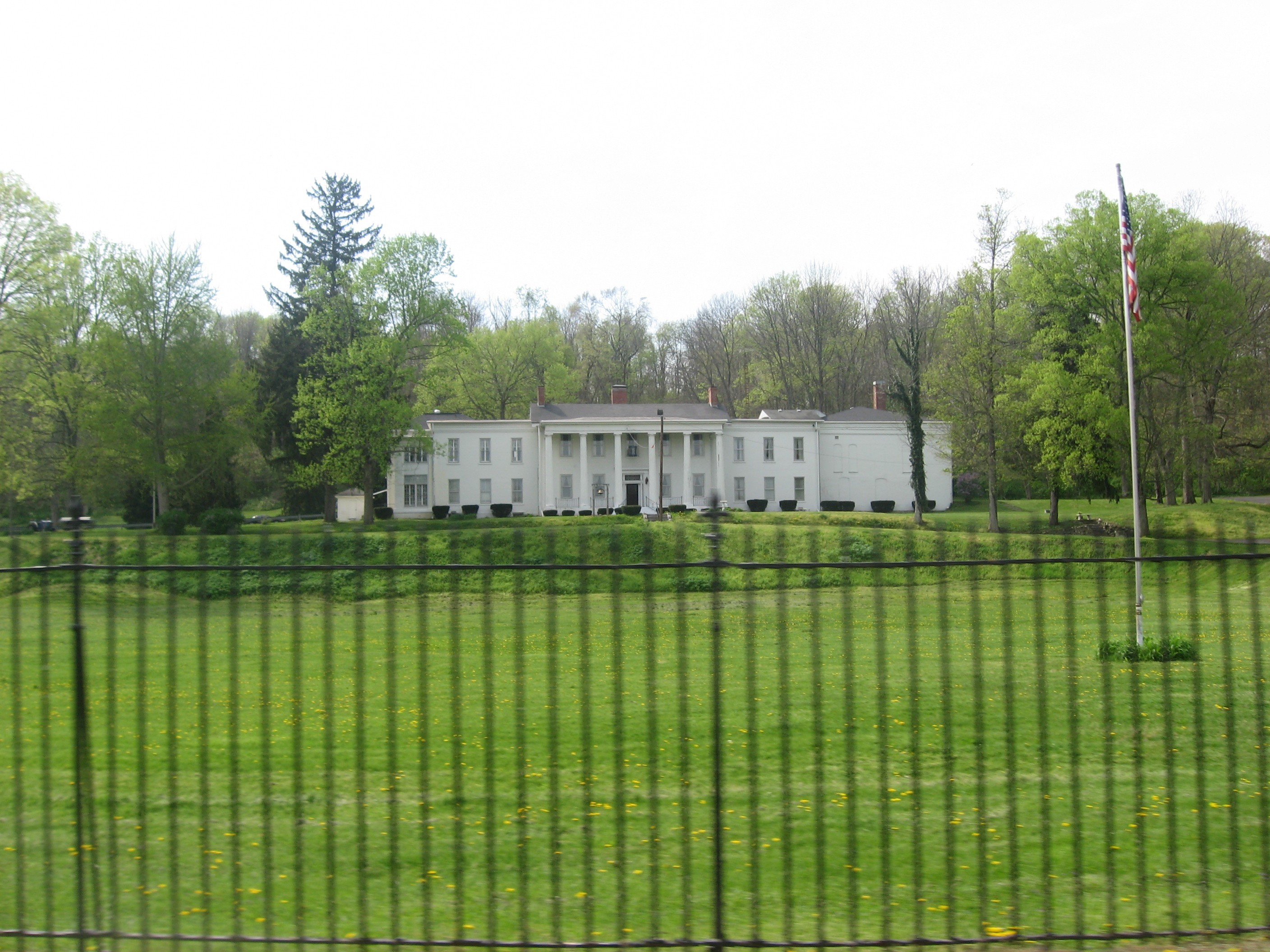
Elmhurst, Huston's Connersville home

A Republican, Huston was elected to the Connersville City Council in 1876, and was re-elected in 1878. In 1880, he was elected to the Indiana House of Representatives. In 1882, he was elected to the Indiana Senate, representing Fayette County, Rush County, and Union County. He was chairman of the Indiana Republican Party during the 1884 U.S. presidential election and the 1888 U.S. presidential election.

In 1889, President of the United States Benjamin Harrison nominated Huston to be Treasurer of the United States and Huston subsequently held that office from May 11, 1889, until April 24, 1891.

After leaving office, Huston later became president of the National Trust Company. On January 3, 1910, Huston and two associates were indicted in Washington, D.C. for mail fraud. He was convicted on December 14, 1910.

Huston died in 1927.

Government offices
Preceded by James W. Hyatt	Treasurer of the United States; May 11, 1889 – April 24, 1891	Succeeded by Enos H. Nebecker
