= Ellis H. Roberts =

American politician (1827–1918)

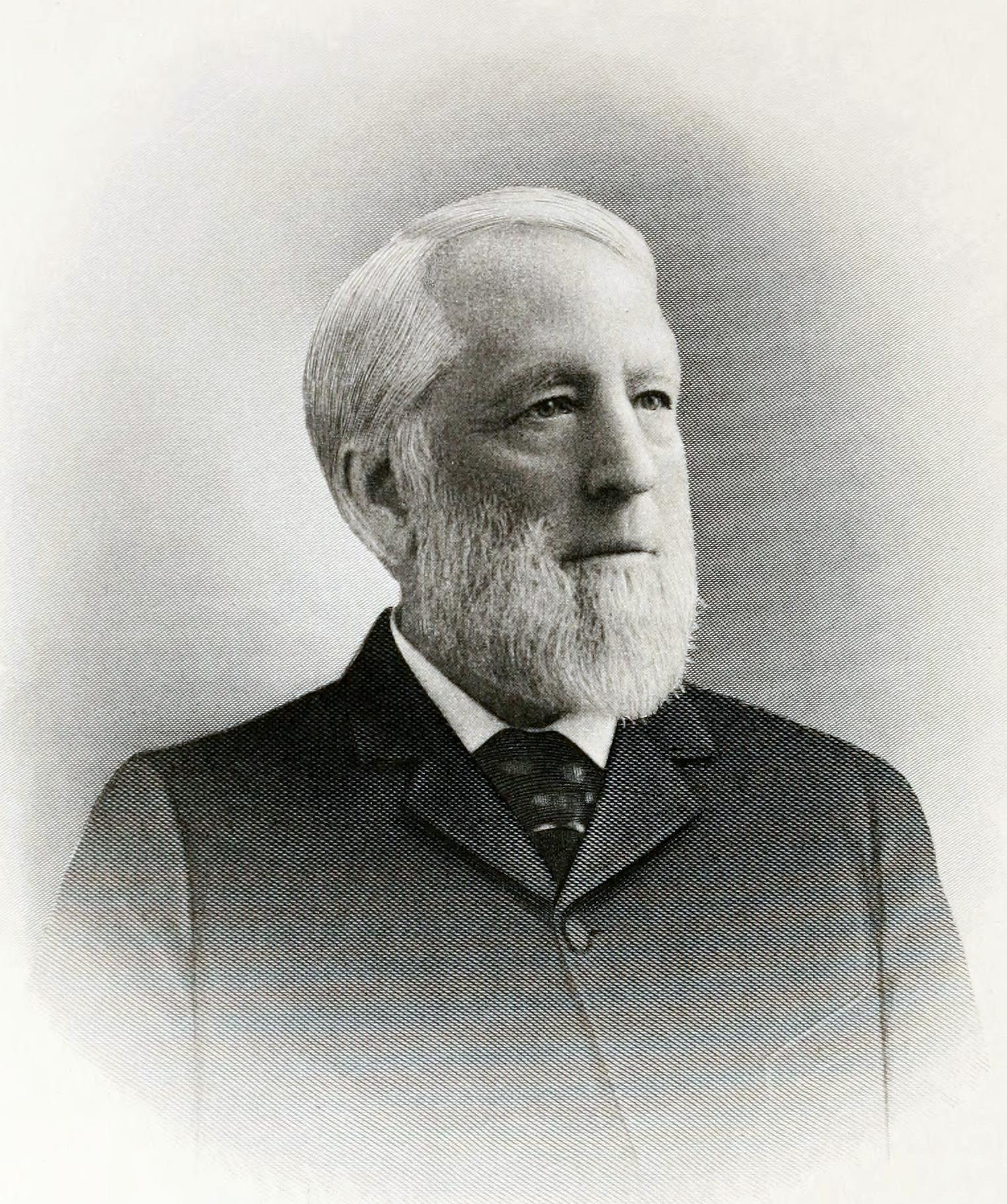

20th Treasurer of the United States
- In office July 1, 1897 – June 30, 1905
- President: William McKinley; Theodore Roosevelt
- Preceded by: D.N. Morgan
- Succeeded by: Charles H. Treat

Member of the U.S. House of Representatives from New York
- In office March 4, 1871 – March 3, 1875
- Preceded by: Alexander H. Bailey
- Succeeded by: George A. Bagley
- Constituency: 21st district (1871–73); 22nd district (1873–75)

Member of the New York State Assembly from the Oneida County, 2nd district
- In office January 1, 1867 – December 31, 1867
- Preceded by: Alva Penny
- Succeeded by: Alanson B. Cady

Personal details
- Born: September 30, 1827 Utica, New York, U.S.
- Died: January 8, 1918 (aged 90) Utica, New York, U.S.
- Resting place: Forest Hill Cemetery; Utica, New York, U.S.
- Party: Republican
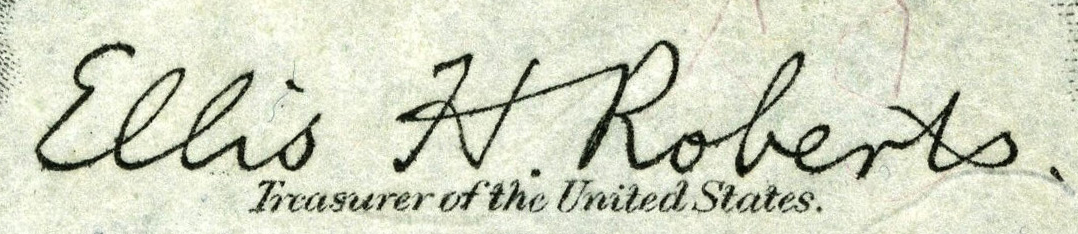
- Signature

Ellis Henry Roberts (September 30, 1827 – January 8, 1918) was an American politician who served as a Representative from New York and 20th Treasurer of the United States.

Roberts was born in Utica, Oneida County, New York on September 30, 1827. He attended the common schools and the Whitestown Seminary and graduated from Yale College in 1850, where he was a member of the Alpha Delta Phi and Skull and Bones. He served as principal of Utica Free Academy in 1850 and 1851 and became editor and proprietor of the Utica Morning Herald 1851 - 1889. He was a delegate to the Republican National Conventions in 1864, 1868, and 1876; and a member of the New York State Assembly (Oneida Co., 2nd D.) in 1867.

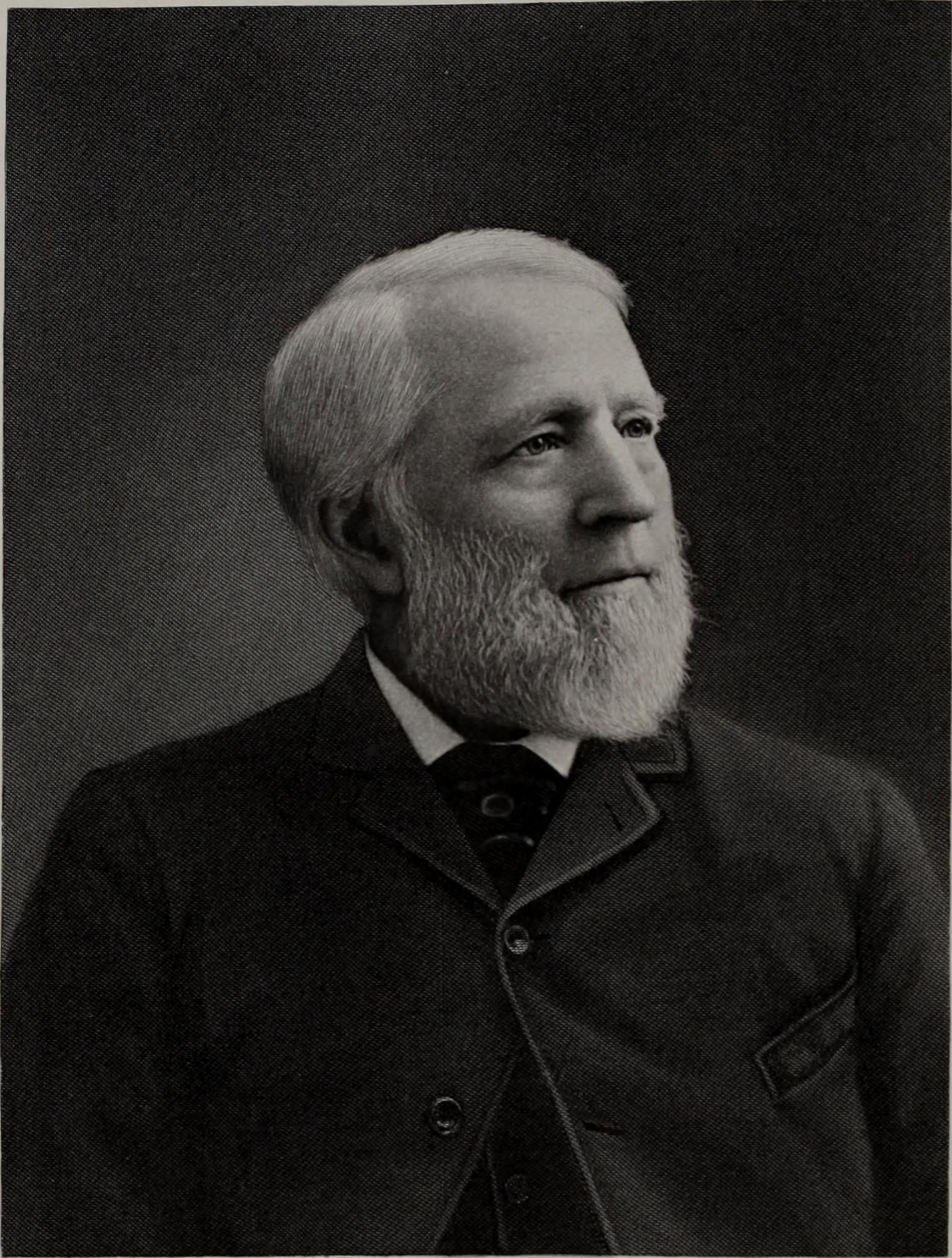
Ellis H. Roberts, circa 1913

Roberts was elected as a Republican to the Forty-second and Forty-third Congresses (March 4, 1871 – March 3, 1875); unsuccessful candidate for reelection in 1874 to the Forty-fourth Congress; resumed his former newspaper activities in Utica, N.Y.; Assistant Treasurer of the United States 1889 - 1893; president of the Franklin National Bank of New York City 1893 - 1897; appointed Treasurer of the United States on July 1, 1897, and served until June 30, 1905, when he resigned; again engaged in banking; died in Utica, New York, January 8, 1918; interment in Forest Hill Cemetery in Utica.

== Ellis Henry Roberts the protectionist ==
Ellis Henry Roberts’ Government Revenue, Especially the American System. An Argument for Industrial Freedom vindicates the policy of favoring developing domestic commerce over foreign commerce which protectionism does best. Roberts was also a member of the American Protective Tariff League. He stated that the tariff has been one of the main reasons why our production has been augmented. When we have had low duties something equivalent to free trade our, industries were battered and depressed, but they have thrived when protectionism was the policy. He saw the precious home market as for the home trade which was monumental, and were it to invite foreign commerce the home market would be sacrificed, and national sovereignty will be in peril. Thus, for strategic purposes the government should favor producers rather than those that exploit trade in all laws that it makes. Roberts considered the most benevolent act of good will that any people can perform to the public welfare is to not engage in what favors foreign commerce what trade likes most but to foster the diversity of employments, produce. He also thought that the legislator who seeks to have his nation engage in commerce without developing a diversity of employments acts like a person making the gravest of mistakes.

In addition he stated that rather than decrease production, what we ought to do is create a perfectly more manufacturing sector, and excellent diversity of employments. Moreover, he concluded that poverty diminished at a direct ratio in which the diversity of industries had increased in the population. Next Roberts thought that civilization most greatest lesson is that the livelihood of all, most importantly the poor, has been elevated due to the new industries being erected, thus production has augmented the diversity of employments. With the policy of fostering the growth the diversity of employments, the United States possessed quite a promising future. It would be an egregious injustice for Washington D.C. to play an instrumental part in contracting our scale of production, and to opt for a revenue system that heavily courts foreign trade instead of facilitating a diversity of employments for our home markets.

== Roberts on Adam Smith and Alexander Hamilton ==
Roberts knew what Adam Smith, Mr. Say and Professor William Sumner wanted for the United States. A nation with the potential of satisfying her home markets by developing an enormous home trade was told to organize their economy around agriculture; thus, making the United States be economically dependent on other nations.

Roberts chose to side with Hamilton's view of organizing an economy. Roberts gives a precise brief commentary on Hamilton's celebrated Report on Manufactures, he says Hamilton considered relying on foreign commerce by mainly using agricultural goods as a waste. He also saw England's fortified regulations which only invited raw materials and food stuffs as not something the young nation wanted to take advantage of. Hamilton thought that America's agriculture's best market was in America, and that developing resources that insured America's future was paramount. In addition to this Hamilton strongly asserted that the government had the right to stimulate and foster acquiring knowledge, manufactures, agriculture, and commerce. He saw duties on imports as a strategic way to elevate manufactures. Moreover, he added that bounties, premiums and some raw materials be brought in free of duty, and that inventors be rewarded for their congenial pursuits that benefited man. Lastly Hamilton saw these actions as quite worthwhile to pursue to create a constant mass clientele for the agricultural commodities in the home market.

== American commerce versus British commerce ==
Roberts did not want the United States to forsake its home trade and favor the ways of the British. The British way was foreign commerce. England relied on foreign commerce so much because her production was too dependent on foreign consumption, but U.S production relied on domestic consumption, and the U.S home market was becoming the envy of all those nations that conducted foreign commerce. Roberts said, “We want no commerce which we do not win on the field of fair competition. We refuse to maintain a costly navy to force our commodities on unwilling peoples. We have always declined every suggestion to conduct our diplomacy in the interest of foreign trade, except as it is welcomed by the peoples whom we go to seek. The course which we are pursuing has never before been pursued by any great nation, the story of commerce has been a story of violence and grasping greed. The wars of the world have been in large part incited by the purpose to extort treasure and commodities, and to thrust the products of the aggressive power upon reluctant peoples.”

New York State Assembly
Preceded by Alva Penny	New York State Assembly; Oneida County, 2nd District; 1867	Succeeded by Alanson B. Cady
U.S. House of Representatives
Preceded by Alexander H. Bailey	Member of the U.S. House of Representatives from New York's 21st congressional district 1871–1873	Succeeded by Clinton L. Merriam
Preceded by William E. Lansing	Member of the U.S. House of Representatives from New York's 22nd congressional district 1873–1875	Succeeded by George A. Bagley
Political offices
Preceded by Daniel N. Morgan	Treasurer of the United States; 1897–1905	Succeeded by Charles H. Treat
