= Daniel N. Morgan =

American banker

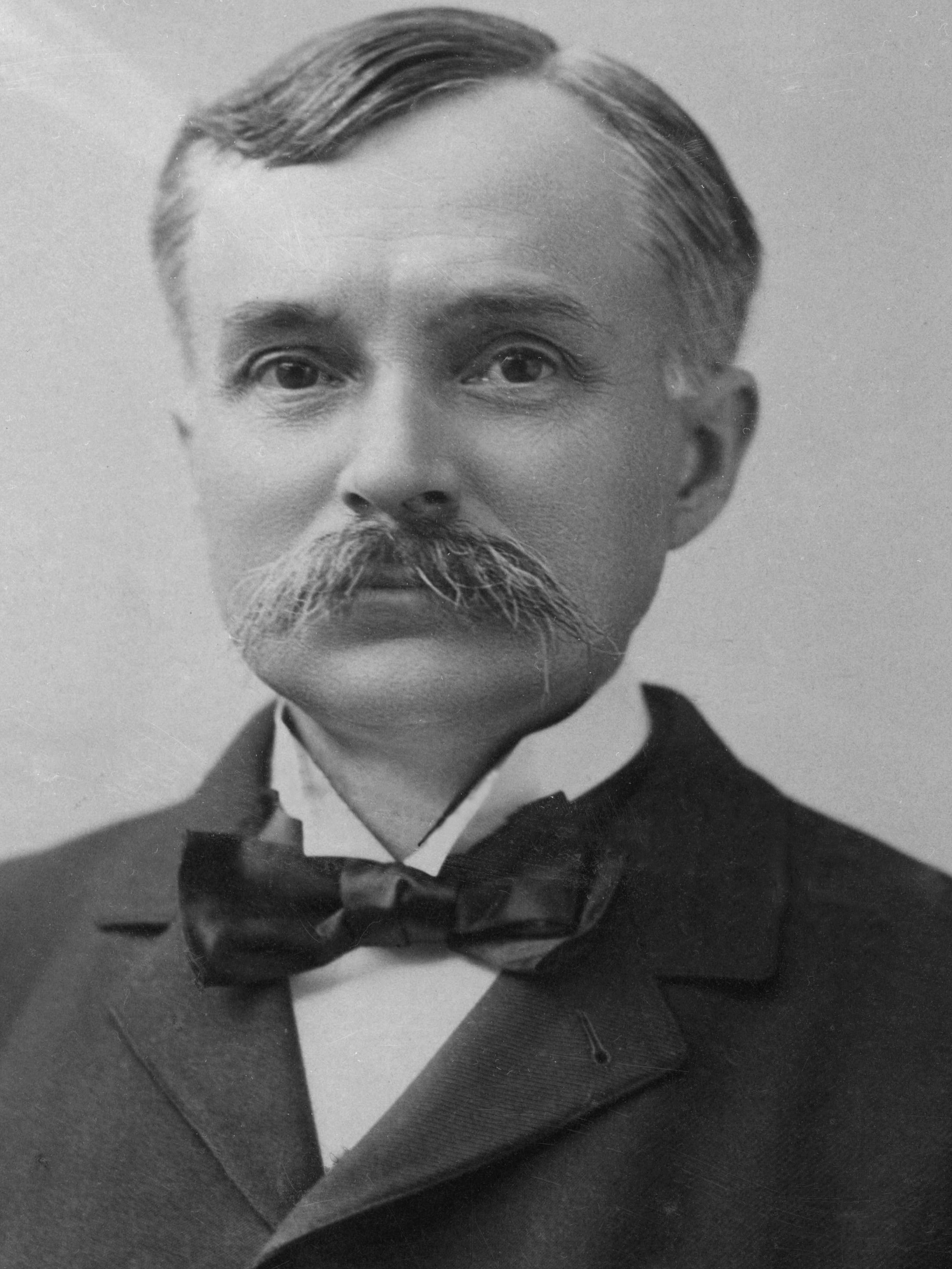

19th Treasurer of the United States
- In office June 1, 1893 – June 30, 1897
- President: Grover Cleveland; William McKinley
- Preceded by: Enos H. Nebeker
- Succeeded by: Ellis H. Roberts

Personal details
- Born: August 18, 1844 Newtown, Connecticut, U.S.
- Died: May 30, 1931 (aged 86) Bridgeport, Connecticut, U.S.
- Resting place: Mountain Grove Cemetery, Bridgeport
- Occupation: banker
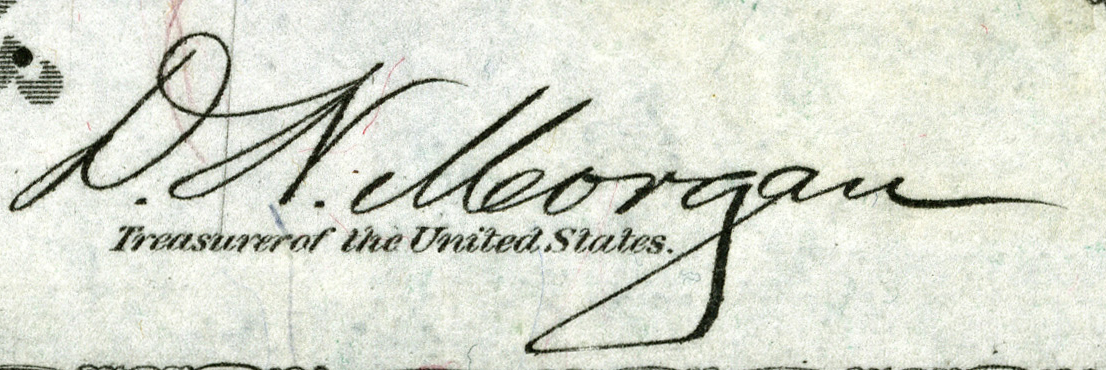
- Signature

Daniel Nash Morgan (August 18, 1844 – May 30, 1931) was a United States banker who was Treasurer of the United States from 1893 to 1897.

== Biography ==
Daniel N. Morgan was born in Newtown, Connecticut on August 18, 1844. His father owned a store, which he took over as a young man. He later took a partner, running the store as Morgan & Booth. In 1869, he moved to Bridgeport, Connecticut, becoming a partner in Birdsey & Morgan, a firm producing dry goods and carpets. He also ran a grocery, Morgan, Hopson & Co., in 1877. In 1879, he became president of the City National Bank of Bridgeport.

Morgan was elected to the Bridgeport common council in 1873 and served until 1874. He was a member of the Bridgeport Board of Education from 1877 to 1878 and was mayor of Bridgeport in 1880 and 1884.

In 1893, President Grover Cleveland named Morgan Treasurer of the United States and Morgan held that office from June 1, 1893, until June 30, 1897.

He married a descendant of William Judson of Stratford, Connecticut. The Morgans had a son, William Judson Morgan, and a daughter, May Huntington Morgan.

Morgan was a candidate for governor of Connecticut in 1898, but lost to George E. Lounsbury.

In 1911 Morgan was arrested for mail fraud in association with a scheme devised by Jared Flagg, a stockbroker notorious for pyramid schemes. All defendants were released after evidence was disqualified.

Morgan died in Bridgeport on May 30, 1931, 12 days after being hit by an automobile. He is buried in Mountain Grove Cemetery, Bridgeport.

Party political offices
Preceded by Joseph B. Sargent	Democratic nominee for Governor of Connecticut; 1898	Succeeded by S. L. Bronson
Government offices
Preceded by Enos H. Nebeker	Treasurer of the United States; June 1, 1893 – June 30, 1897	Succeeded by Ellis H. Roberts
