= Patton Museum =

Patton Museum may refer to the following museums in the United States:

- General George Patton Museum of Leadership, Fort Knox, Kentucky
- General George S. Patton Memorial Museum, Chiriaco Summit, California
