= James Earle Fraser (sculptor) =

American sculptor (1876-1953)

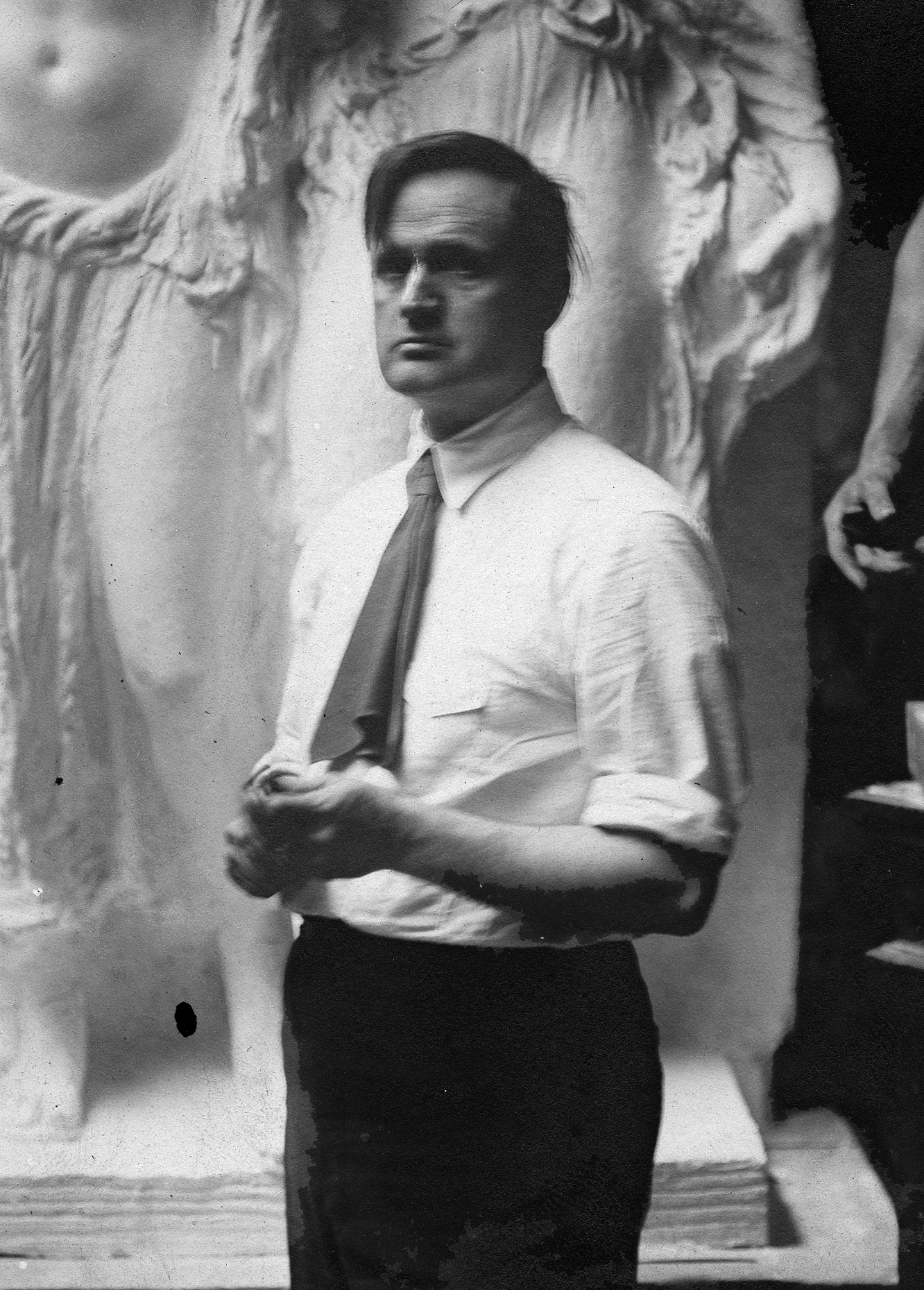
- Fraser, c. 1920
- Born: November 4, 1876; Winona, Minnesota, U.S.
- Died: October 11, 1953 (aged 76); Westport, Connecticut, U.S.
- Education: The School of The Art Institute of Chicago; École des Beaux-Arts
- Known for: Sculpture

James Earle Fraser (November 4, 1876 – October 11, 1953) was an American sculptor during the first half of the 20th century. His work is integral to many of Washington, D.C.'s most iconic structures.

== Life and career ==
Fraser was born in Winona, Minnesota. James' wife Laura's genealogy could be traced back to Protestant Huguenots. His mother Caroline's genealogy could be traced back to the Plymouth Pilgrims. His father, Thomas Fraser, was an engineer who worked for railroad companies as they expanded across the American West. A few months before his son was born, Thomas Fraser was one of a group of men sent to recover the remains of the 7th Cavalry Regiment following George Armstrong Custer's disastrous engagement with the Lakota, Cheyenne, and Arapaho forces at the Battle of the Little Bighorn.

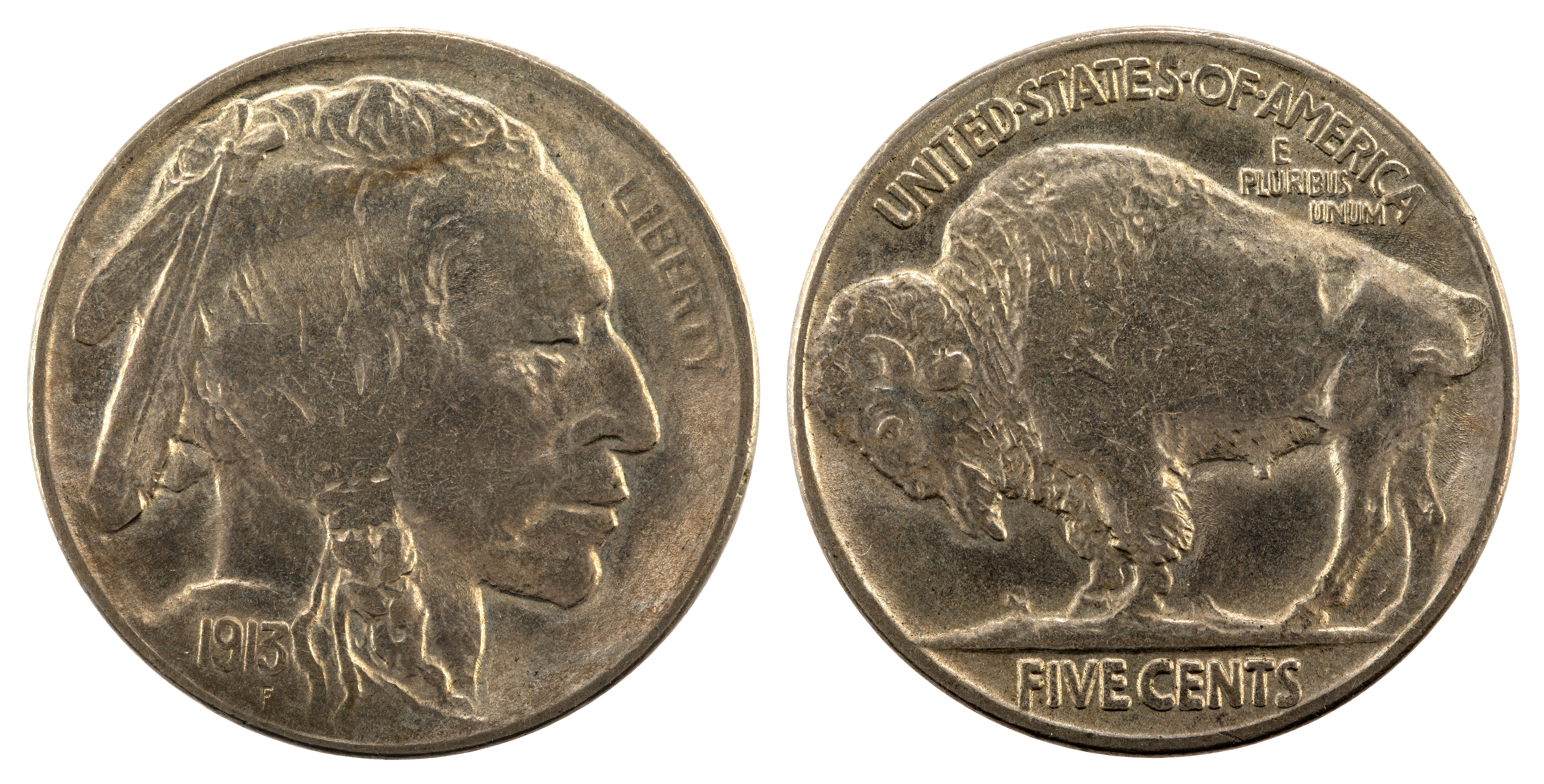
1913 Indian Head nickel obverse and reverse

As a child, James Fraser was exposed to frontier life and the experience of Native Americans, who were being pushed ever further west or confined to Indian reservations. These early memories were expressed in many of his works, from his earlier trials, such as the bust Indian Princess, to his most famous projects, such as End of the Trail and the Indian Head (Buffalo) nickel.

Fraser began carving figures from pieces of limestone scavenged from a stone quarry close to his home near Mitchell, South Dakota in early life. He attended classes at The School of The Art Institute of Chicago in 1890 and studied at the École des Beaux Arts and the Académie Julian in Paris in the late 19th century. Early in his career, Fraser served as an assistant to Richard Bock and Augustus Saint-Gaudens; he formed his own studio in 1902. He also taught at the Art Students League in New York City beginning in 1906, and later became its director. His work was also part of the sculpture event in the art competition at the 1928 Summer Olympics.

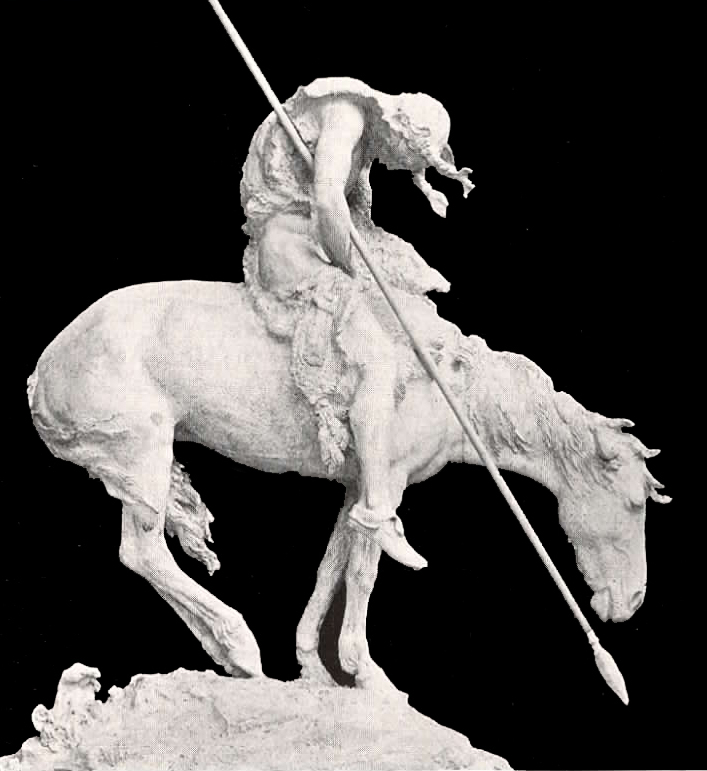
Fraser's sculpture End of the Trail

Among his earliest works were sculptural pieces at the World's Columbian Exposition of 1893 and, for the 1915 Panama–Pacific International Exposition in San Francisco, one of his most famous pieces, End of the Trail. While End of the Trail was meant to be cast in bronze, material shortages due to World War I prevented this. After the Exposition, the original plaster statue was moved to Mooney's Grove Park in Visalia, California. Exposed to the elements, it slowly deteriorated. End of the Trail was obtained by the National Cowboy & Western Heritage Museum in 1968 and restored. The restored statue is currently on display in the entryway of the Oklahoma City museum, and the original that sat in Visalia, CA, was replaced with a bronze replica. The original bronze replica is located in Shaler Park, in Waupun, Wisconsin. The statue was commissioned by inventor and sculptor Clarence Addison Shaler and donated to the City of Waupun on June 23, 1929.

Fraser's work in Washington includes The Authority of Law and The Contemplation of Justice at the U.S. Supreme Court; the south pediment and statues at the National Archives; Alexander Hamilton and Albert Gallatin at the U.S. Treasury; and the Second Division Monument, completed with the firm of architect John Russell Pope. His commissions also include coins and medals, such as the World War I Victory Medal, the Navy Cross, and the Indian Head (Buffalo) nickel. This coin was discontinued after 1938, but has since been reprised in 2001 on a US commemorative coin, and more recently on a gold buffalo one ounce gold bullion coin.

Fraser’s major works include two heroic bronze equestrian statues titled The Arts of Peace, designed for the entrance to the Rock Creek and Potomac Parkway, behind the Lincoln Memorial. The pair was a companion to sculptor Leo Friedlander's The Arts of War, installed immediately to the south at the east end of Arlington Memorial Bridge. The groups had been designed in the 1930s but were not cast until the 1950s, because of a shortage of metals during World War II.

Fraser was a member of the National Academy of Design, the National Sculpture Society, and the Architectural League of New York. His numerous awards and honors include election to the National Institute of Arts and Letters and gold medal from the Architectural League in 1925. He served on the U.S. Commission of Fine Arts in Washington, D.C., from 1920 to 1925.

Muralist Barry Faulkner, a friend of Fraser’s from their days in Paris together described Fraser like this: "His character was like a good piece of Scotch tweed, handsome, durable and warm." [see Wilkonson, References] Fraser's papers and those of his wife, sculptor Laura Gardin Fraser, are held at the Special Collections Research Center at Syracuse University Library, the Smithsonian Archives of American Art, and the National Cowboy & Western Heritage Museum.

James Earle Fraser died on October 11, 1953, at Westport, Connecticut, and is buried in Willowbrook Cemetery.

== Gallery ==
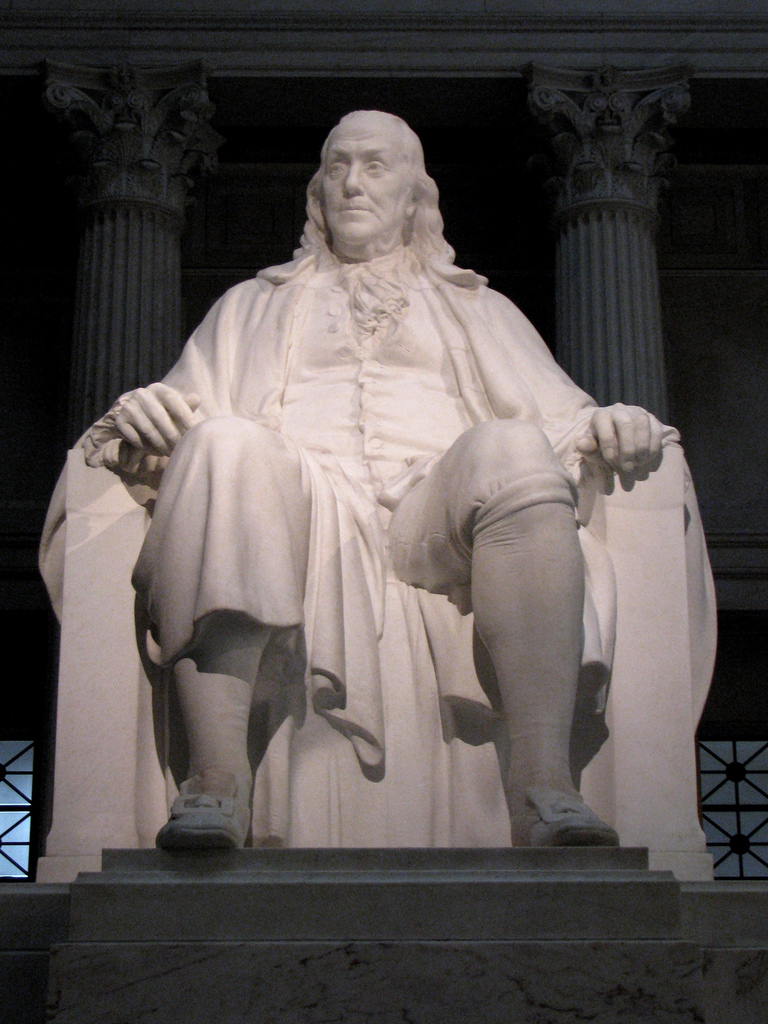
Benjamin Franklin National Memorial, Franklin Institute, Philadelphia

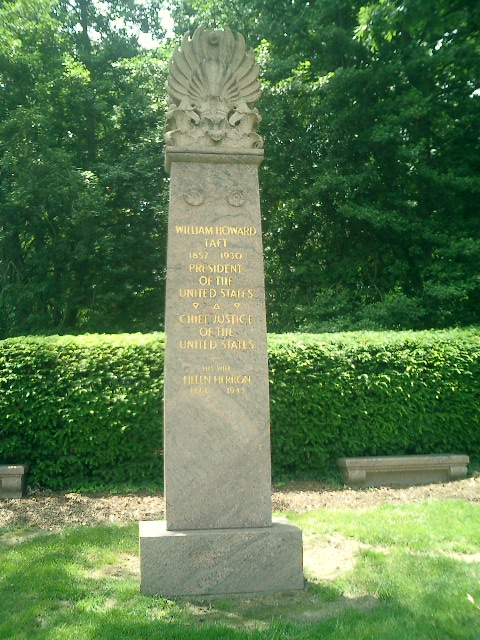
William Howard Taft Monument, Arlington National Cemetery, Arlington, Virginia

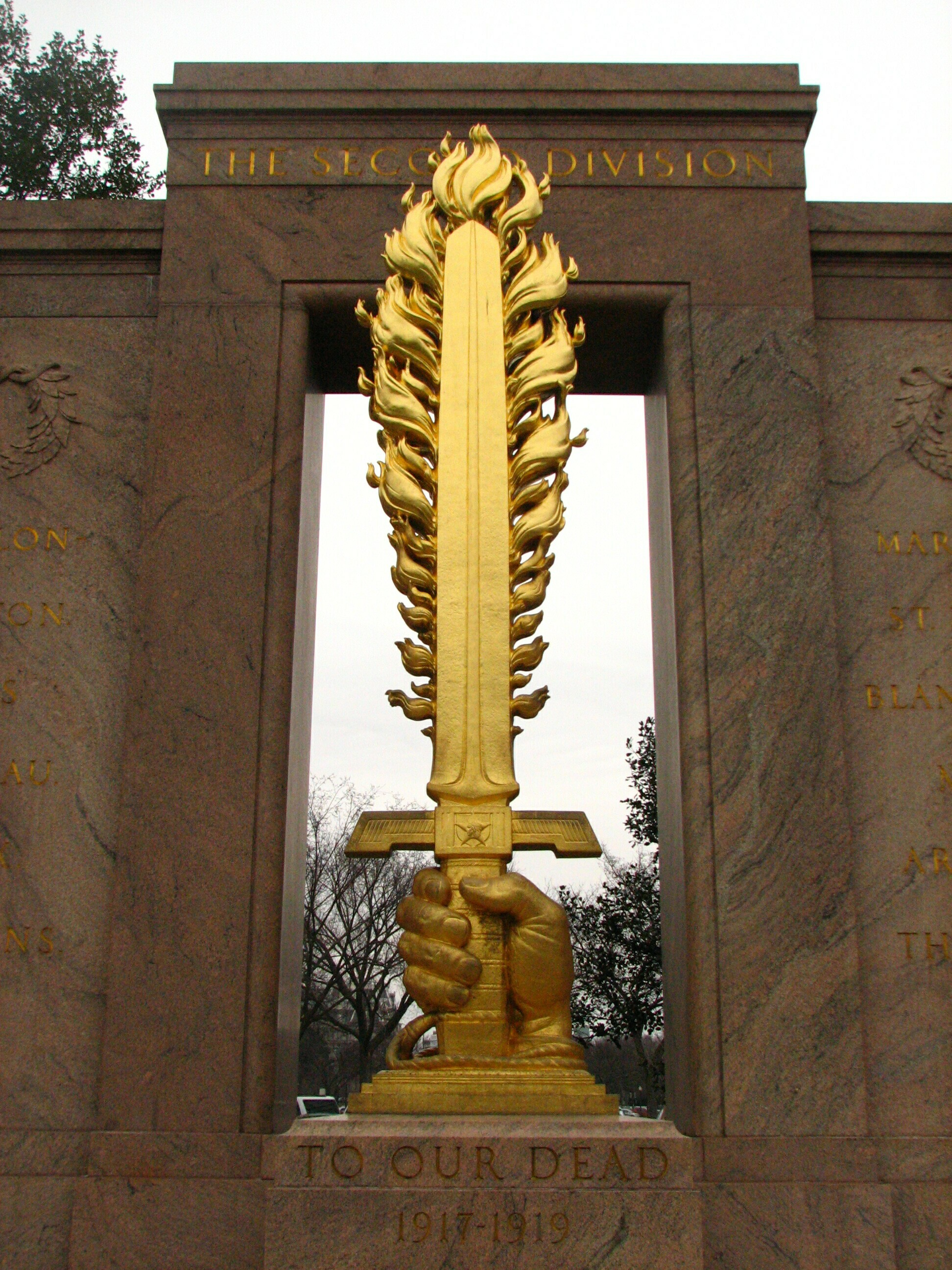
Second Division Memorial, The Ellipse, Washington, D.C.

The Arts of Peace statues at Memorial Circle and Rock Creek Parkway

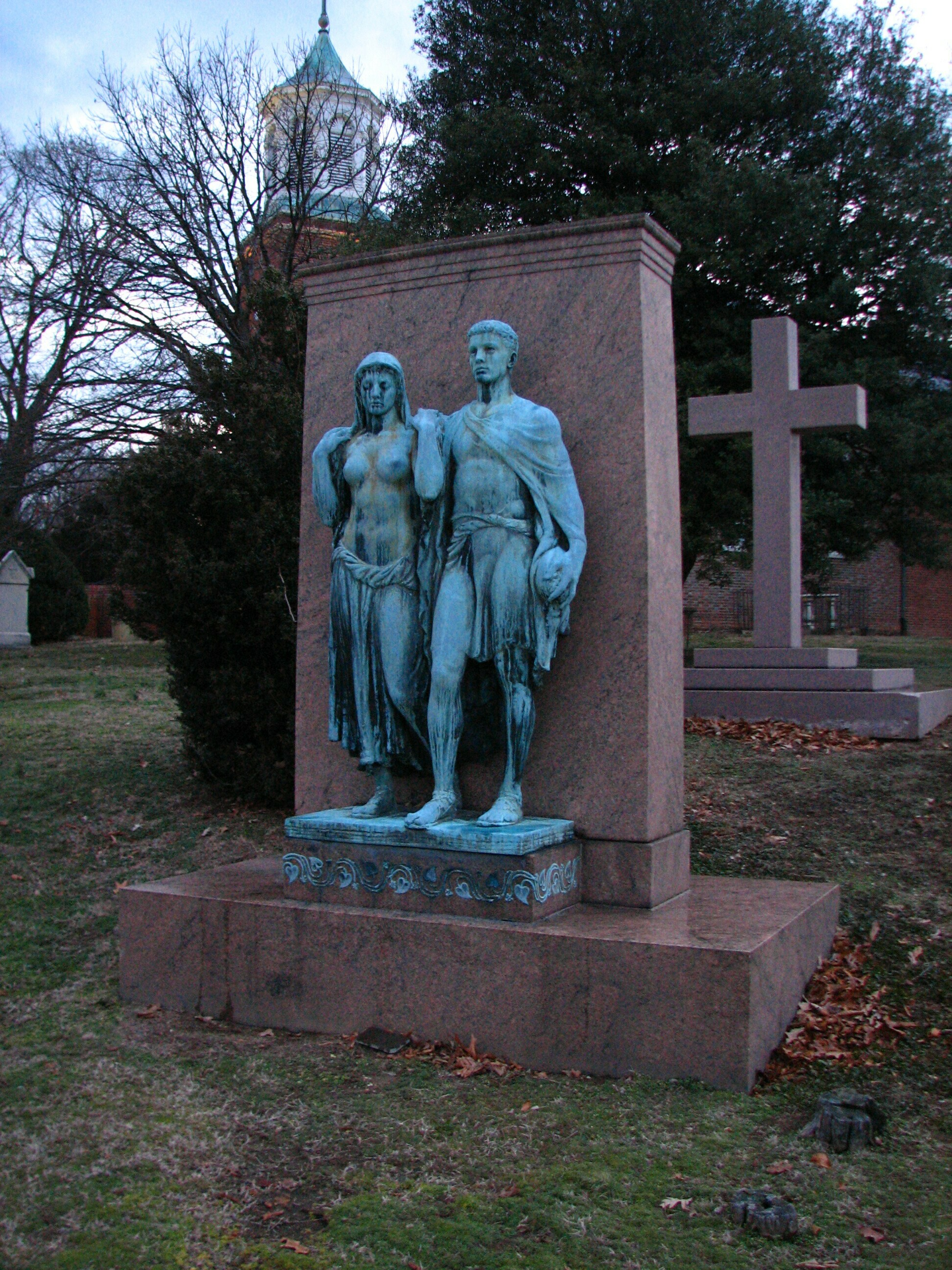
Frederick Keep Monument. Rock Creek Cemetery, Washington, D.C.

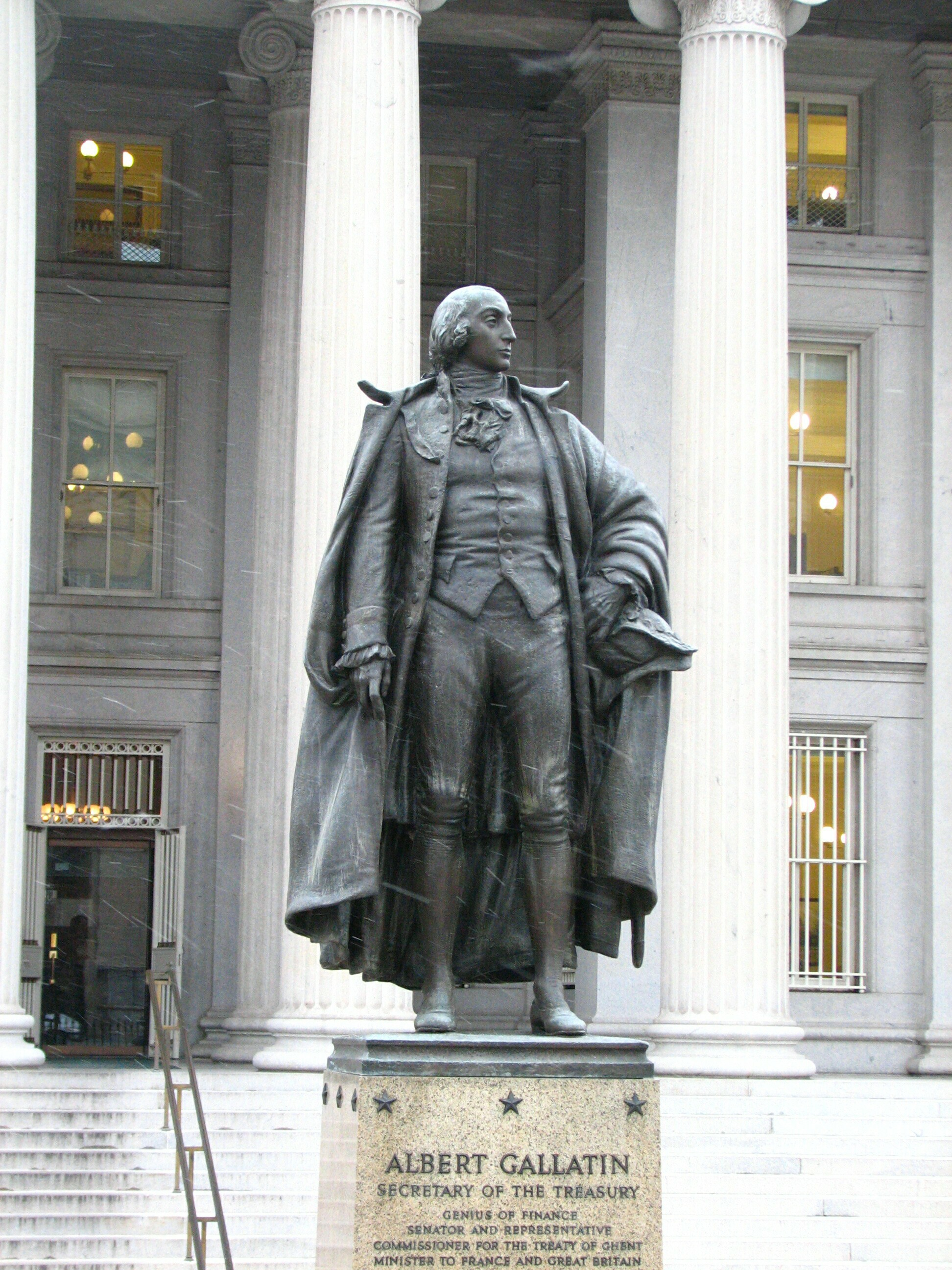
Statue of Albert Gallatin, United States Treasury, Washington, D.C.

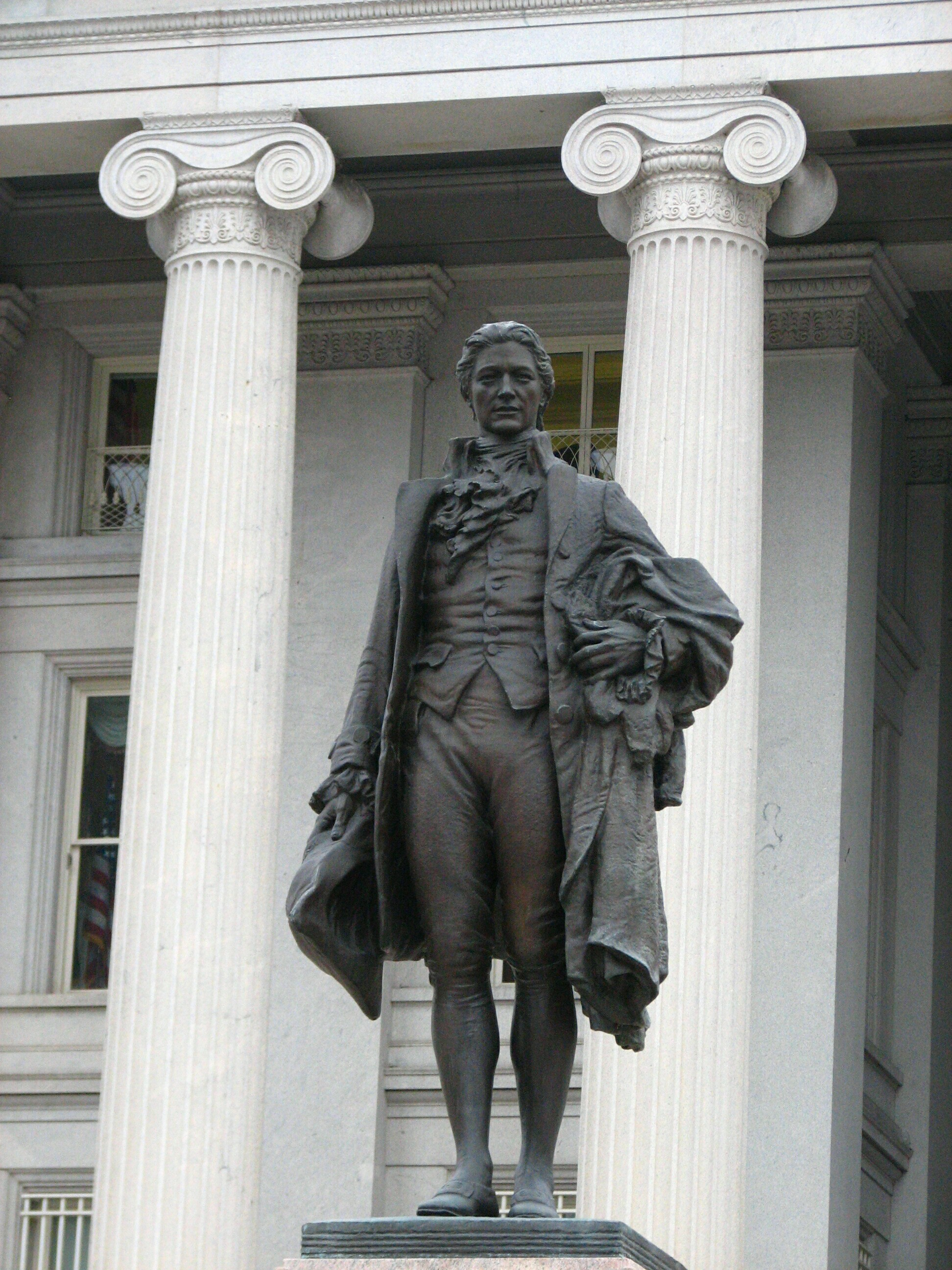
Statue of Alexander Hamilton, United States Treasury, Washington, D.C.

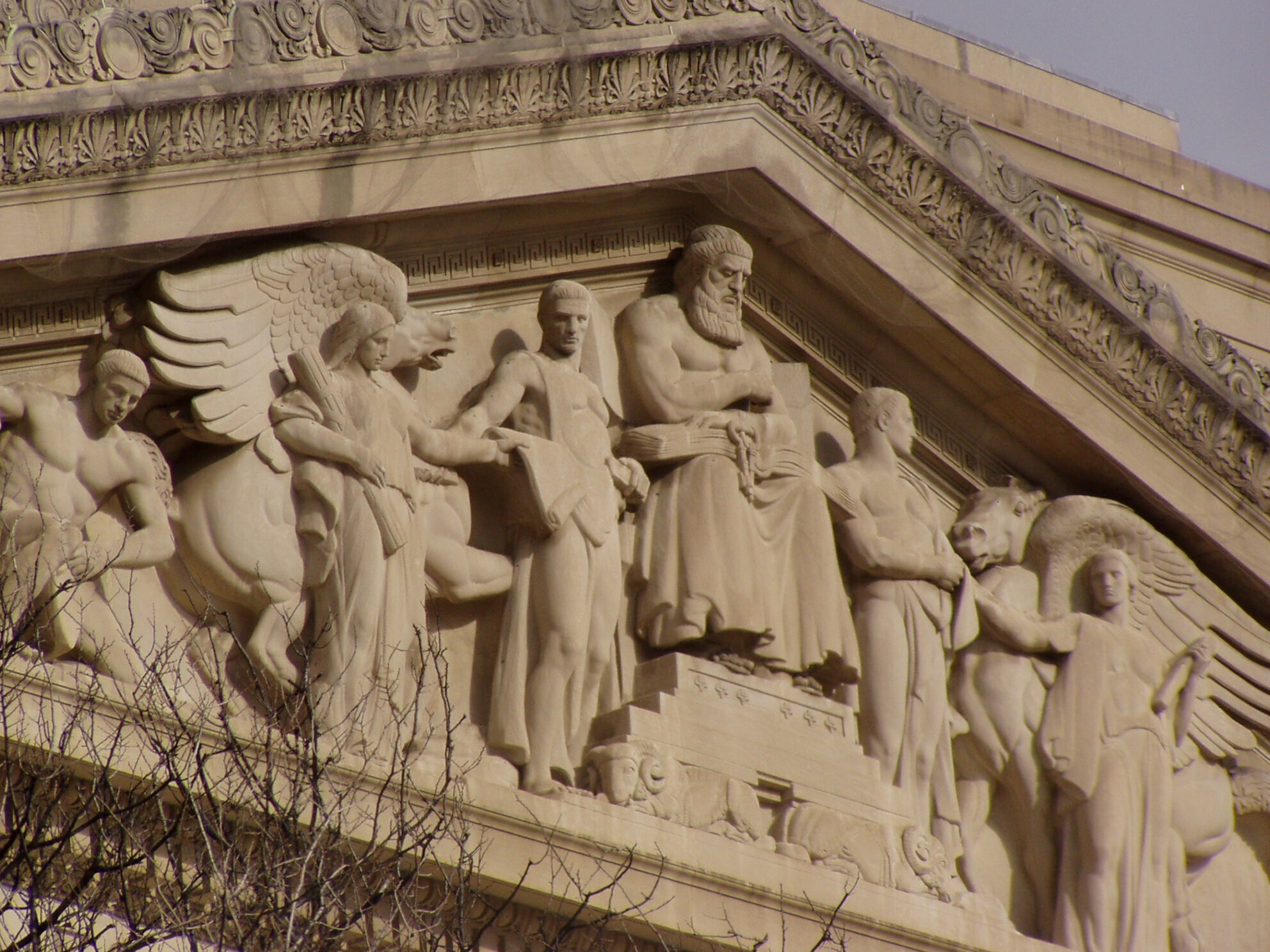
Recorder of the Archive, Pediment of National Archives and Records Administration Building, Washington D.C.

Guardianship sculpture, National Archives and Records Administration Building, Washington D.C.

Heritage sculpture, National Archives and Records Administration Building, Washington D.C.

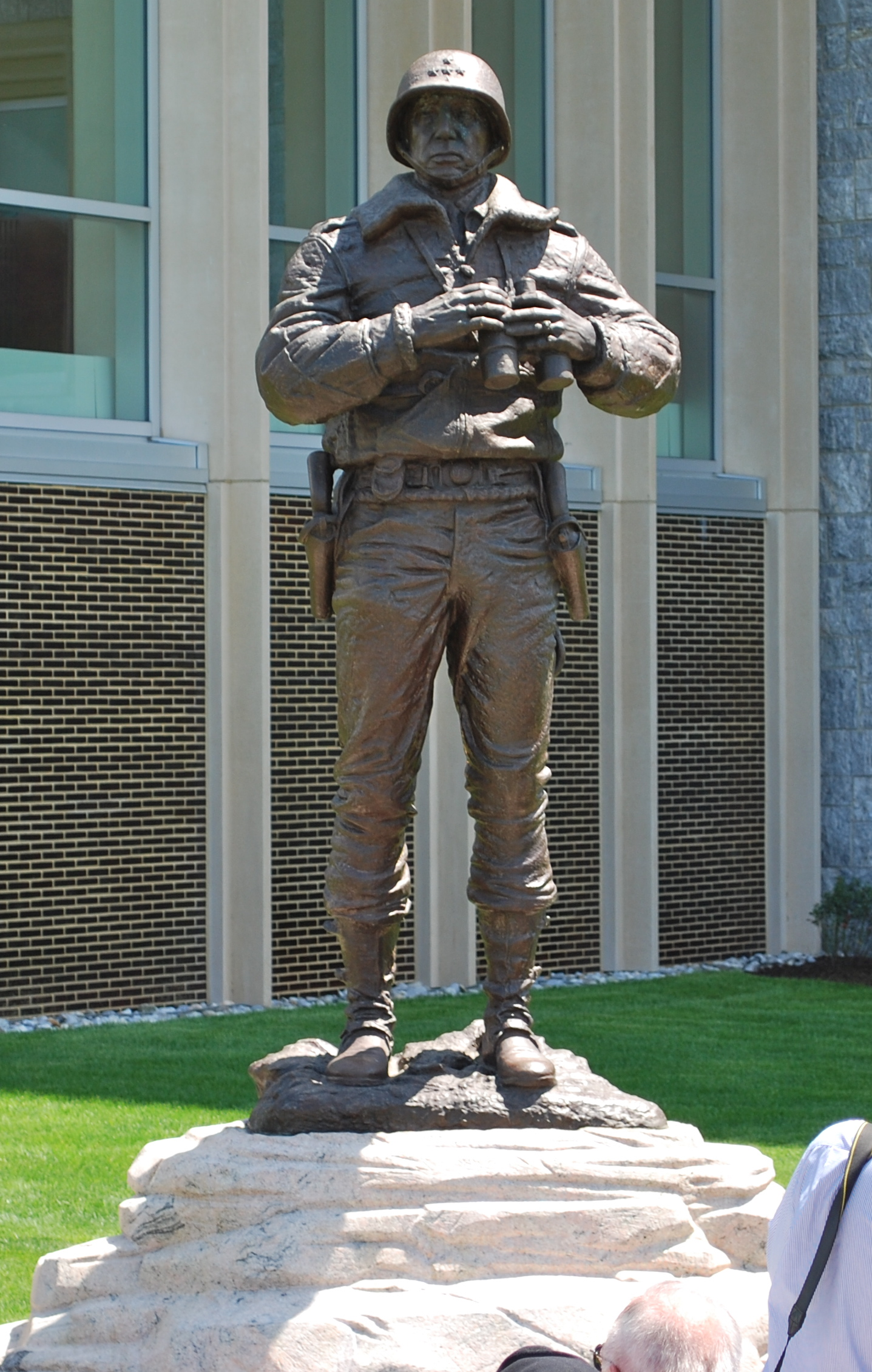
General George S. Patton, U.S. Military Academy, West Point, New York

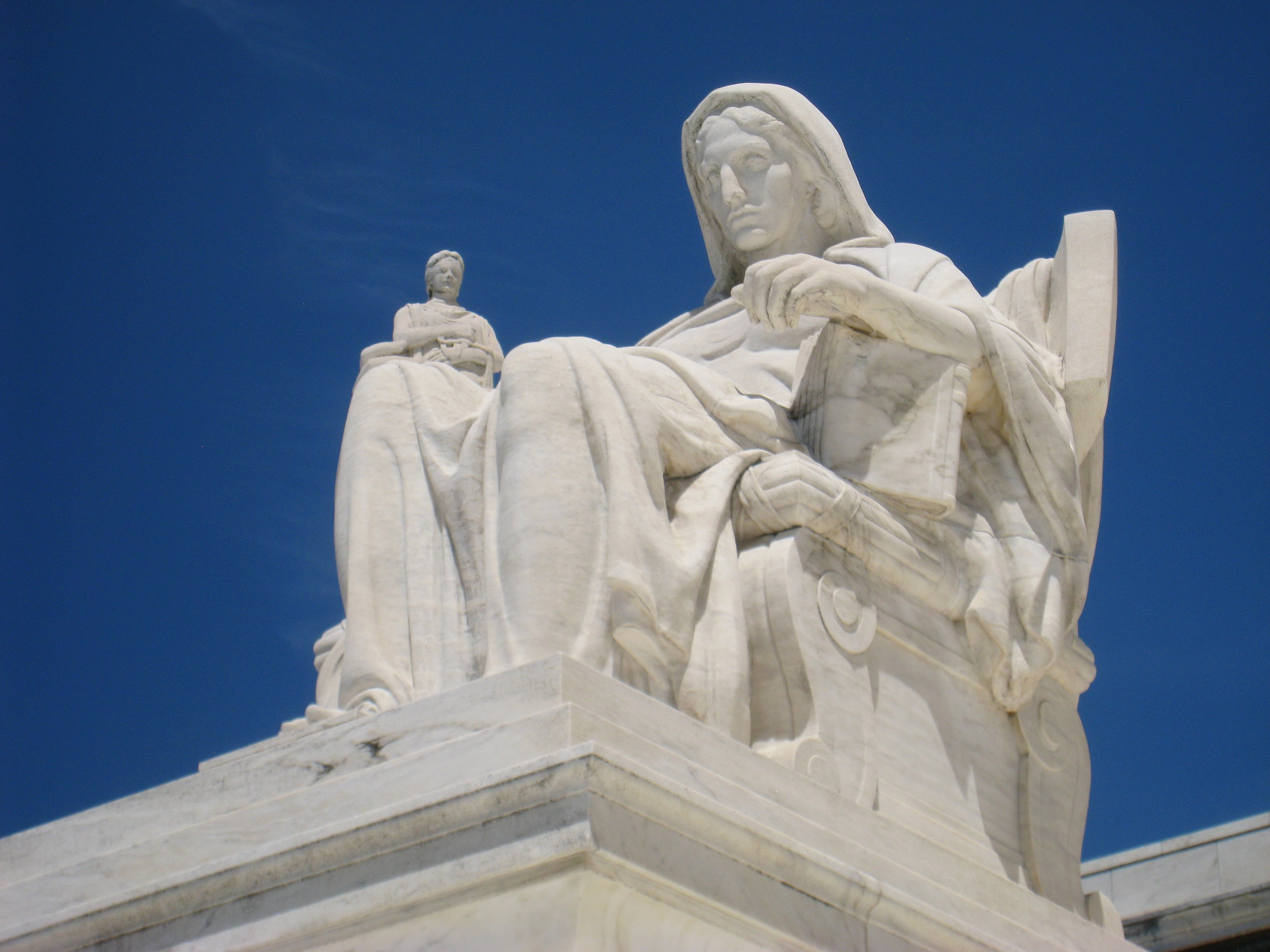
Contemplation of Justice, United States Supreme Court Building, Washington, D.C.

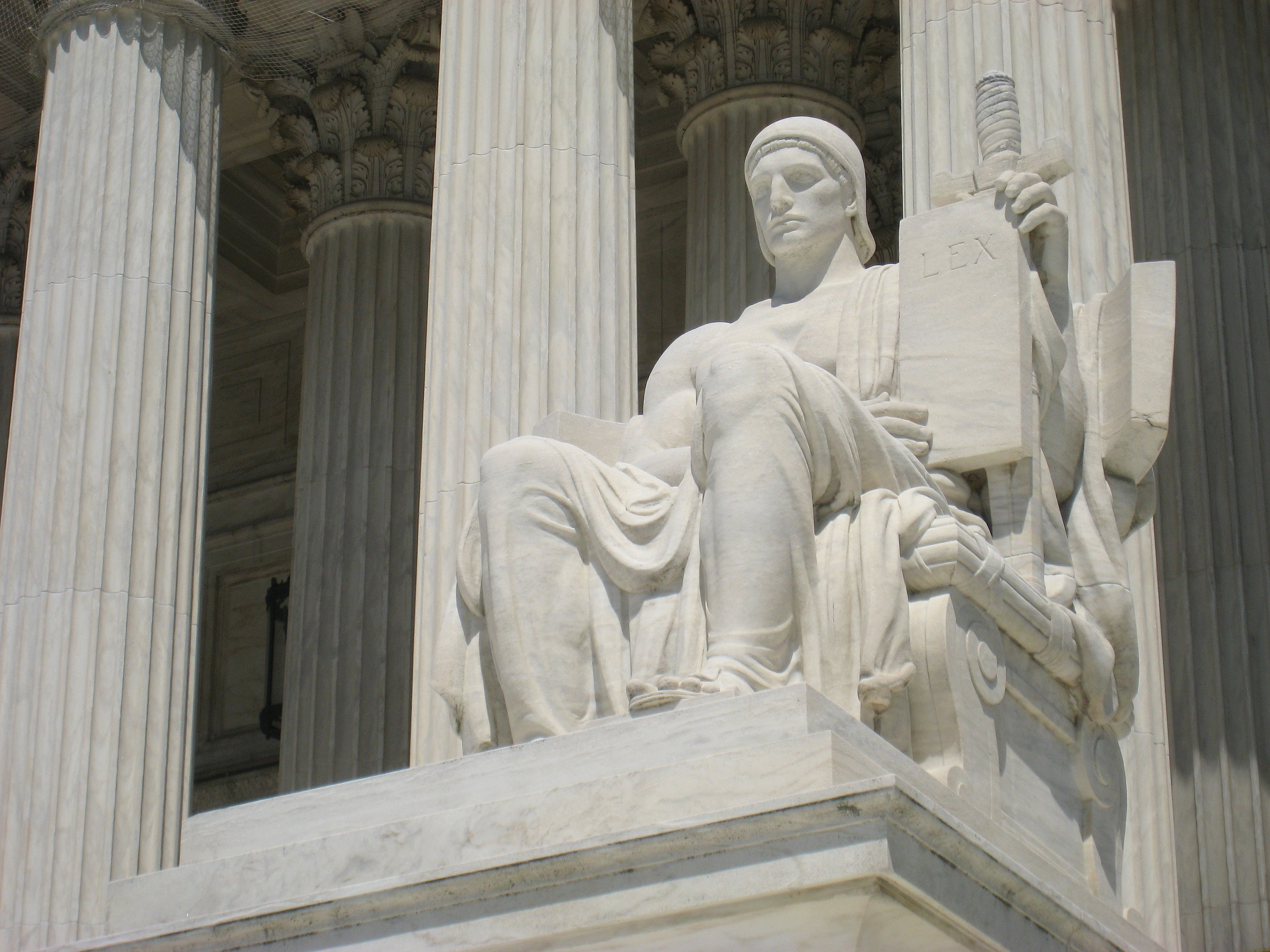
Authority of Law, United States Supreme Court Building, Washington, D.C.

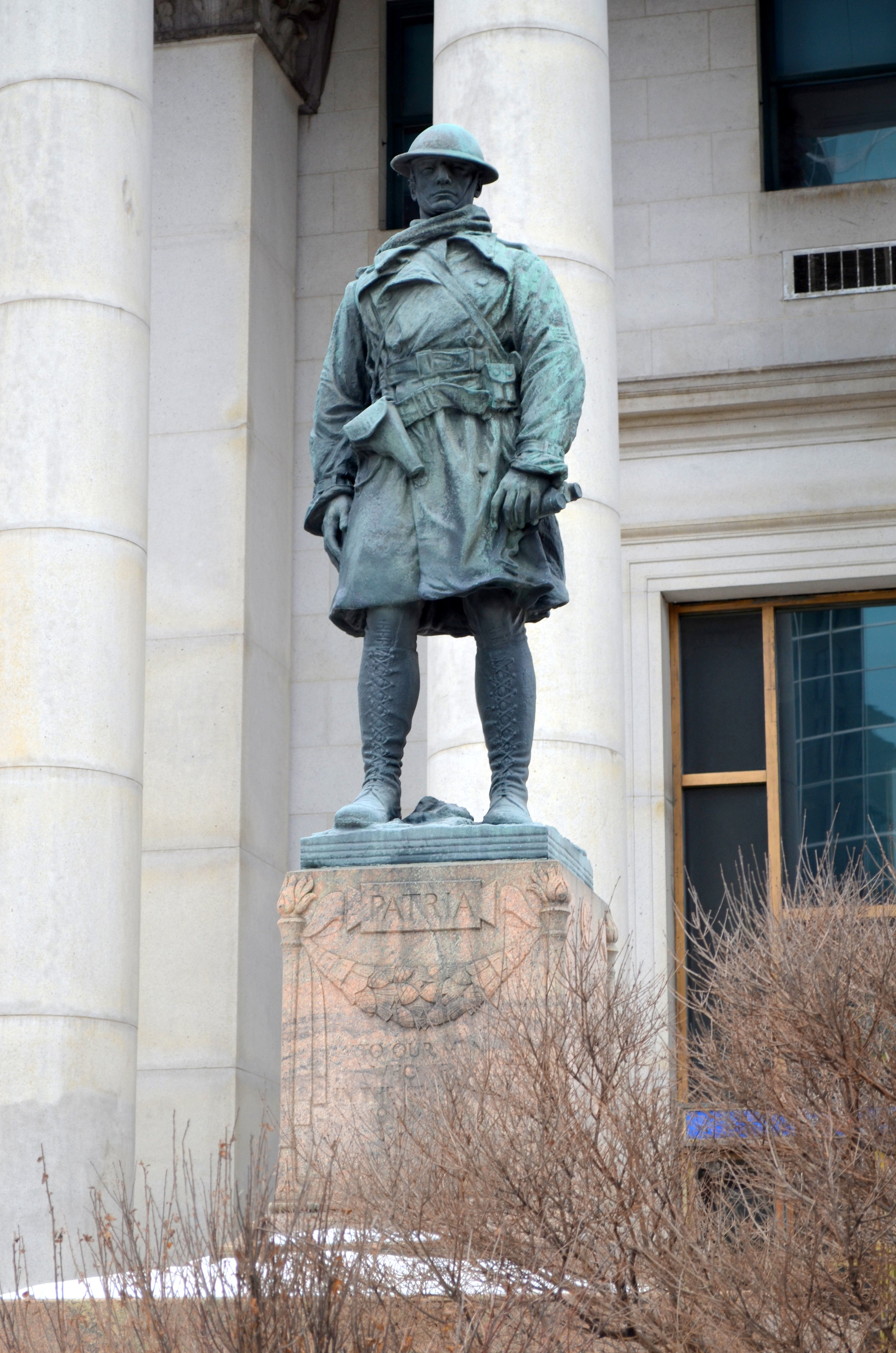
Captain Wynn Bagnall MC, Statue in Winnipeg, Canada

== Works ==
=== Public monuments ===
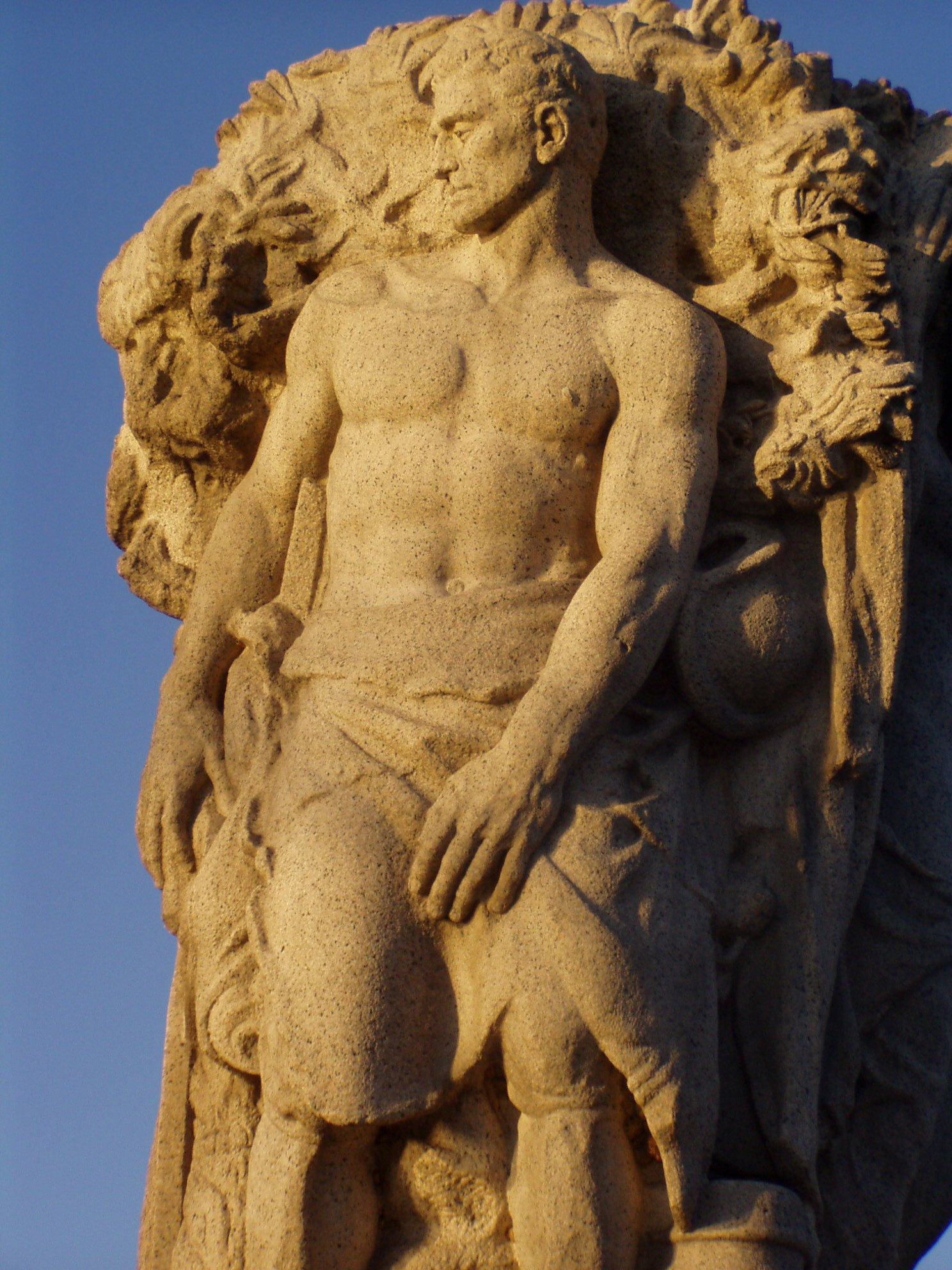
John Ericsson National Memorial, Washington DC

- 1906-1911 Benjamin Franklin sculpture, Benjamin Franklin National Memorial, Franklin Institute, Philadelphia (Memorial dedicated 1938)
- 1908 Recumbent figure of Bishop Potter, Cathedral of Saint John the Divine, New York, Manhattan
- 1911 Frederick Keep Monument, Rock Creek Cemetery, Washington, D.C.
- 1916 John Hay Memorial, Lake View Cemetery, Cleveland, Ohio
- 1920 Canadian Officer, Bank of Montreal, Winnipeg, Manitoba, Canada
- 1920 Symbolic figures, Elks National Veterans Memorial, Chicago, Illinois
- 1923 Alexander Hamilton, Treasury Building, Washington, D.C.
- 1926 John Ericsson National Memorial, East Potomac Park, Washington, D.C.
- 1926 Thomas Jefferson, Meriwether Lewis, and William Clark, Missouri State Capitol, Jefferson City, Missouri
- 1930 Abraham Lincoln Memorial (Jersey City, New Jersey, and Syracuse, New York, 1930)
- 1936 Second Division Memorial, The Ellipse, Washington, D.C.
- 1940 Equestrian Statue of Theodore Roosevelt, American Museum of Natural History, Central Park West, Manhattan, New York (In 2022 it was removed from the American Museum of Natural History of New York to be transferred to the Roosevelt National Library that will open in 2026 in North Dakota)
- 1947 Albert Gallatin, Treasury Building, Washington, D.C.
- 1948 Benjamin Franklin Statue, Franklin Insurance Company, Springfield, Illinois
- 1949 Thomas A. Edison Statue, Greenfield Village, Dearborn, Michigan
- 1950 Harvey S. Firestone Memorial, Akron, Ohio
- 1951 General George S. Patton, Jr., United States Military Academy, West Point, New York, and Hatch Shell, Boston, Massachusetts
- 1951 Music and Harvest, The Arts of Peace, Washington, D.C.
- 1951 Aspiration and Literature, The Arts of Peace, Washington, D.C.

=== Selected architectural sculpture ===
- 1928 Discoverers and Pioneers, Michigan Avenue Bridge, Chicago
- 1929 Robert Todd Lincoln Sarcophagus, Arlington National Cemetery, Arlington, Virginia
- 1932 William Howard Taft Monument, Arlington National Cemetery, Washington, D.C.
- 1934 Pediments for the Department of Commerce Building, Washington, D.C.
- 1935 Recorder of the Archive (pediment), National Archives Building, Washington, D.C.
- 1935 Heritage and Guardianship, National Archives Building, Washington, D.C.
- 1935 Contemplation of Justice and Authority of Law, United States Supreme Court Building, Washington, D.C.
- 1940 Attic figures of Meriwether Lewis, George Rogers Clark, Daniel Boone and John James Audubon, American Museum of Natural History, New York City

=== Other works ===
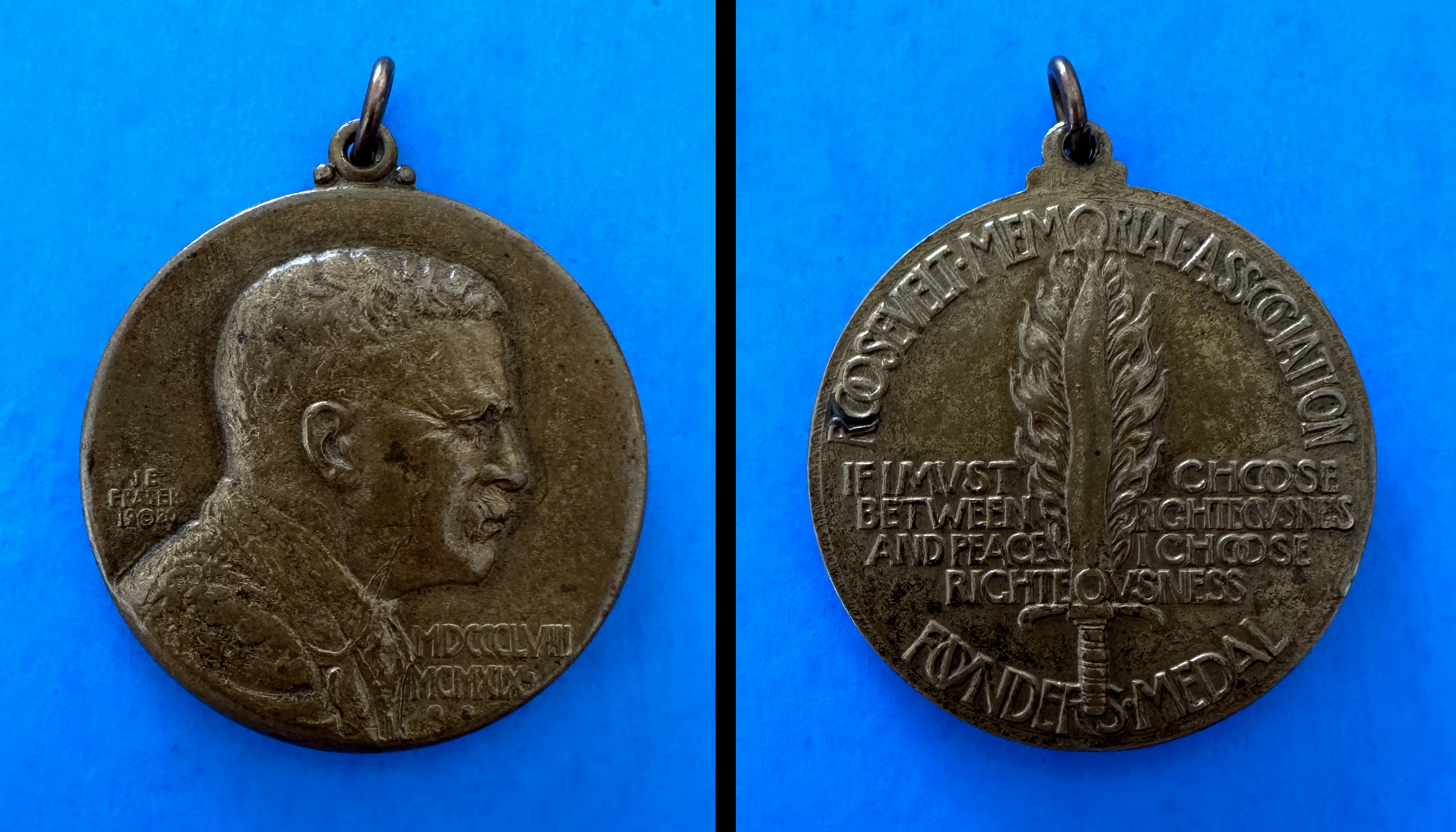
Roosevelt Memorial Association Founders Medal

- 1913 Design of the Buffalo nickel
- 1919 Design of the World War I Victory Medal (United States)
- 1920, Roosevelt Memorial Association Founders Medal
- 1925, Norse-American medal

== See also ==
- List of Saltus Award winners

== Sources ==
- Armstrong, Craven, et al., 200 Years of American Sculpture, Whitney Museum of Art, New York City, 1976
- Bock, Richard W., Memoirs of an American Artist, ed. Dorathi Bock Pierre, C.C. Publishing Co., Los Angeles California 1991
- Craven, Wayne, Sculpture in America, Thomas Y. Crowell Co, New York, New York 1968
- Freundlich, A.L.,The Sculpture of James Earle Fraser, Universal Publishers / uPublish.com USA 2001
- Goode, James M. The Outdoor Sculpture of Washington D.C., Smithsonian Institution Press, Washington D.C. 1974
- Gurney, George, Sculpture and the Federal Triangle, Smithsonian Institution Press, Washington D.C. 1985
- Krakel, Dean, End of the Trail: the Odyssey of a Statue, University of Oklahoma Press, Norman, Oklahoma 1973
- Kvaran, Einar Einarsson, Architectural Sculpture in America, unpublished manuscript
- McSpadden, J. Walker, Famous Sculptors of America, Dodd, Mead and Company, Inc. New York 1924
- National Sculpture Society, Contemporary American Sculpture, The California Palace of the Legion of Honor, Lincoln Park, San Francisco, The National Sculpture Society 1929
- Neuhaus, Eugen, E., Art of the Exposition, Paul Elder and Company, San Francisco 1915
- Proske, Beatrice Gilman, Brookgreen Gardens Sculpture, Brookgreen Gardens, South Carolina, 1968
- Reynalds, Donald Martin, Masters of American Sculpture: The Figurative Tradition From the American Renaissance to the Millennium, Abbeville Press, New York 1993
- Taft, Lorado, The History of American Sculpture, MacMillan Co., New York, New York 1925
- Wilkinson, Burke, and David Finn, photographs, Uncommon Clay: The Life and Works of Augustus Saint-Gaudens, Harcourt Brace Jovanovich, Publishers, San Diego 1985
