= Statue of Alexander Hamilton (Washington, D.C.) =

Statue of Alexander Hamilton by James Earle Fraser in Washington, D.C., U.S.

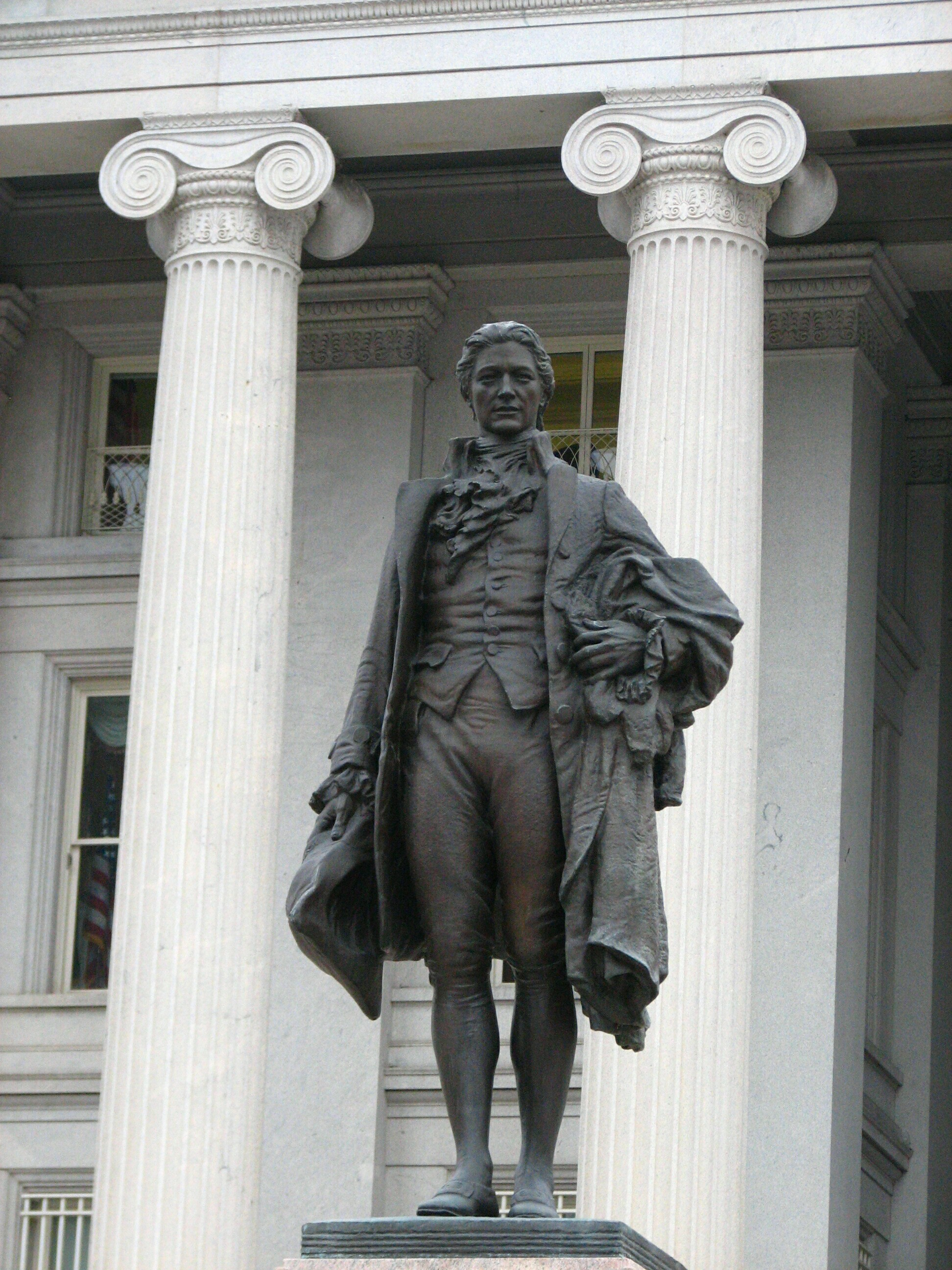
- Year: 1923
- Type: Bronze
- Location: Alexander Hamilton Place, NW Washington, D.C., USA; 38.896661°N 77.034308°W
- Owner: National Park Service

A bronze statue of Alexander Hamilton by James Earle Fraser, dedicated on May 17, 1923, is found on the south patio (Alexander Hamilton Place, NW) of the U.S. Treasury Building in Washington, D.C.

== Description ==
Alexander Hamilton was born on January 11, 1755, or 1757, in Charlestown, the capital of the island of Nevis, in the Leeward Islands. Commissioned in 1917 and cast by the Kunst Foundry, the statue depicts Hamilton holding a tricorn hat and a long dress coat in his hands. In the statue, he is clad in knee breeches, a throat fichu, buckled shoes, and ruffled cuffs. The statue stands 10 feet (3.0 m) high atop a 9 feet (2.7 m)-tall granite base made by Henry Bacon. Charles Atlas posed for this statue.

== Inscriptions ==
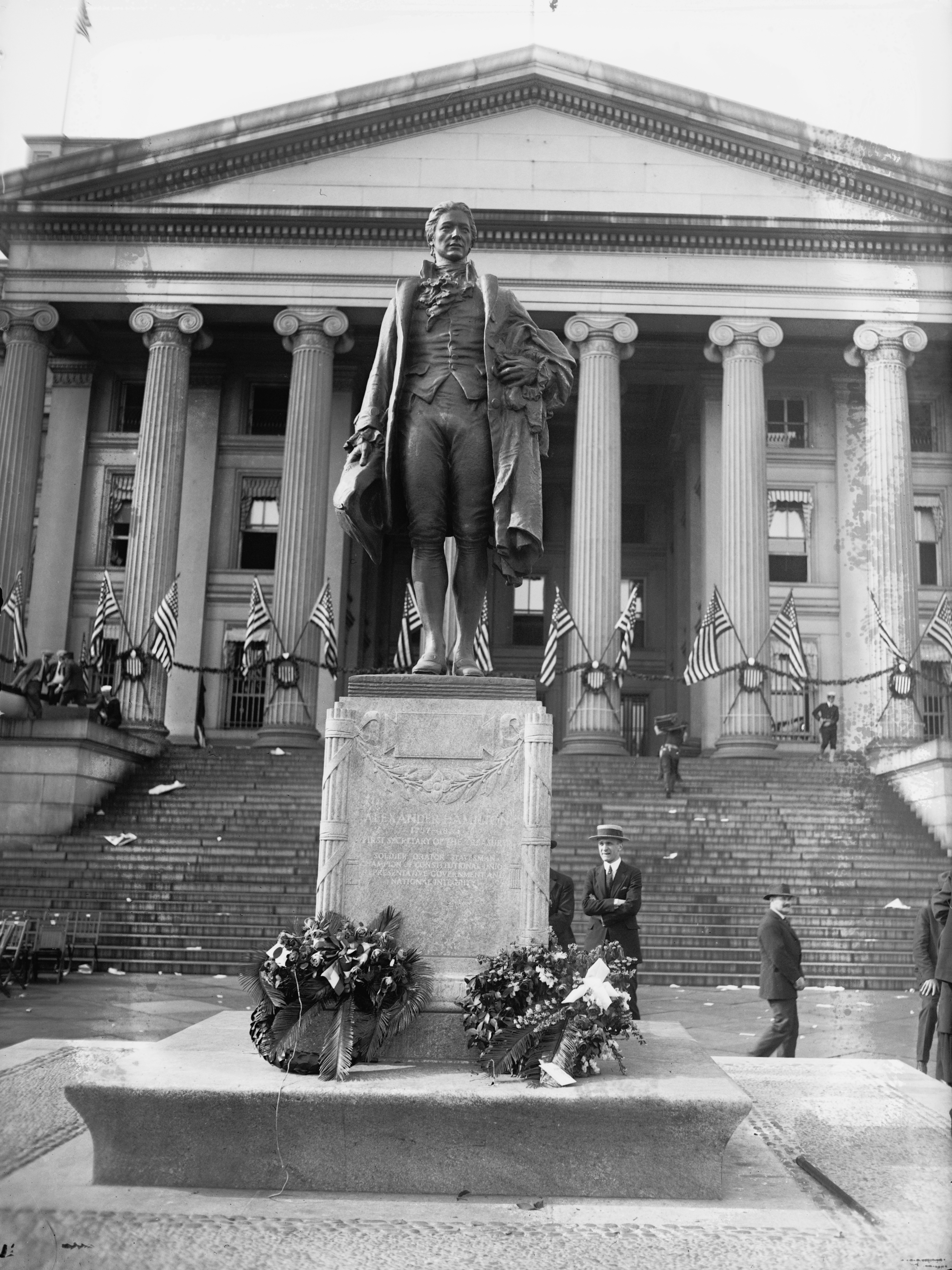
Alexander Hamilton at the dedication

The base of the statue is inscribed on three sides.

The front reads:

ALEXANDER HAMILTON

1757—1804

FIRST SECRETARY OF THE TREASURY

SOLDIER, ORATOR, STATESMAN
CHAMPION OF CONSTITUTIONAL UNION,
REPRESENTATIVE GOVERNMENT AND
NATIONAL INTEGRITY

The rear of the statue reads:

Fraser 1922

A. Kunst Foundry NY

The north face reads:

"He smote the rock of the national resources and abundant streams of revenue gushed forth. He touched the dead corpse of the public credit and it sprang upon its feet."

== Access ==
Access to the statue is now restricted as a result of security upgrades after the September 11th attacks.

== See also ==
- List of public art in Washington, D.C., Ward 2
