= Frederick Keep Monument =

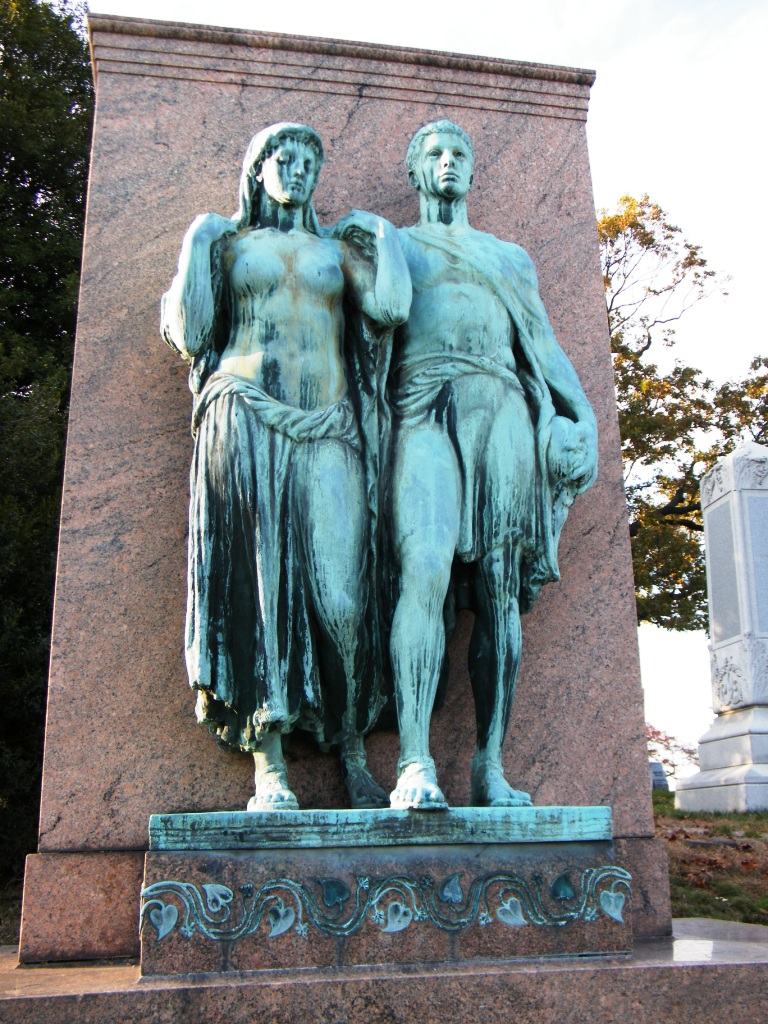
- Monument in 2010
- Artist: James Earle Fraser
- Year: 1920
- Type: Bronze
- Dimensions: 260 cm × 162 cm × 55 cm (102 in × 63.6 in × 21.6 in)
- Location: Washington, D.C., U.S.; 38°56′48.63″N 77°0′42.32″W
- Owner: Rock Creek Cemetery

Frederick Keep Monument is a public artwork by American artist James Earle Fraser located in Rock Creek Cemetery in Washington, D.C. The monument was originally surveyed as part of the Smithsonian's Save Outdoor Sculpture! survey in 1993. This sculpture rests at the site of the grave of Frederick and Florence Keep and their child.

== Description ==
The main portion of this sculpture features a bronze female and male couple standing on a low rectangular base. The female raises both of her arms with her proper right and left hands resting on their respective shoulders. The male figure stands closely on her proper left side with his proper right arm behind her. Both of the figures are bare chested and wear loosely draped Roman-style drapery that is rolled at the waist, as well as Roman sandals. The female figure has a cape on over the back of her head and she looks downward. The male figure gazes out to the distance. They stand in front of a narrow granite wall.

The lower right side of the sculpture is signed: J. E. FRASER The lower left side of the sculpture is marked: Kunst-Foundry N.Y.

The back of the granite base is inscribed:

FREDERIC A. KEEP

DIED JUNE 2, 1911
AGE 53 YEARS
FLORENCE SHEFFIELD BOARDMAN KEEP
DIED JAN 26, 1954
AGE 89 YEARS
INFANT OF F AND F. KEEP
DIED OCT. 6, 1902

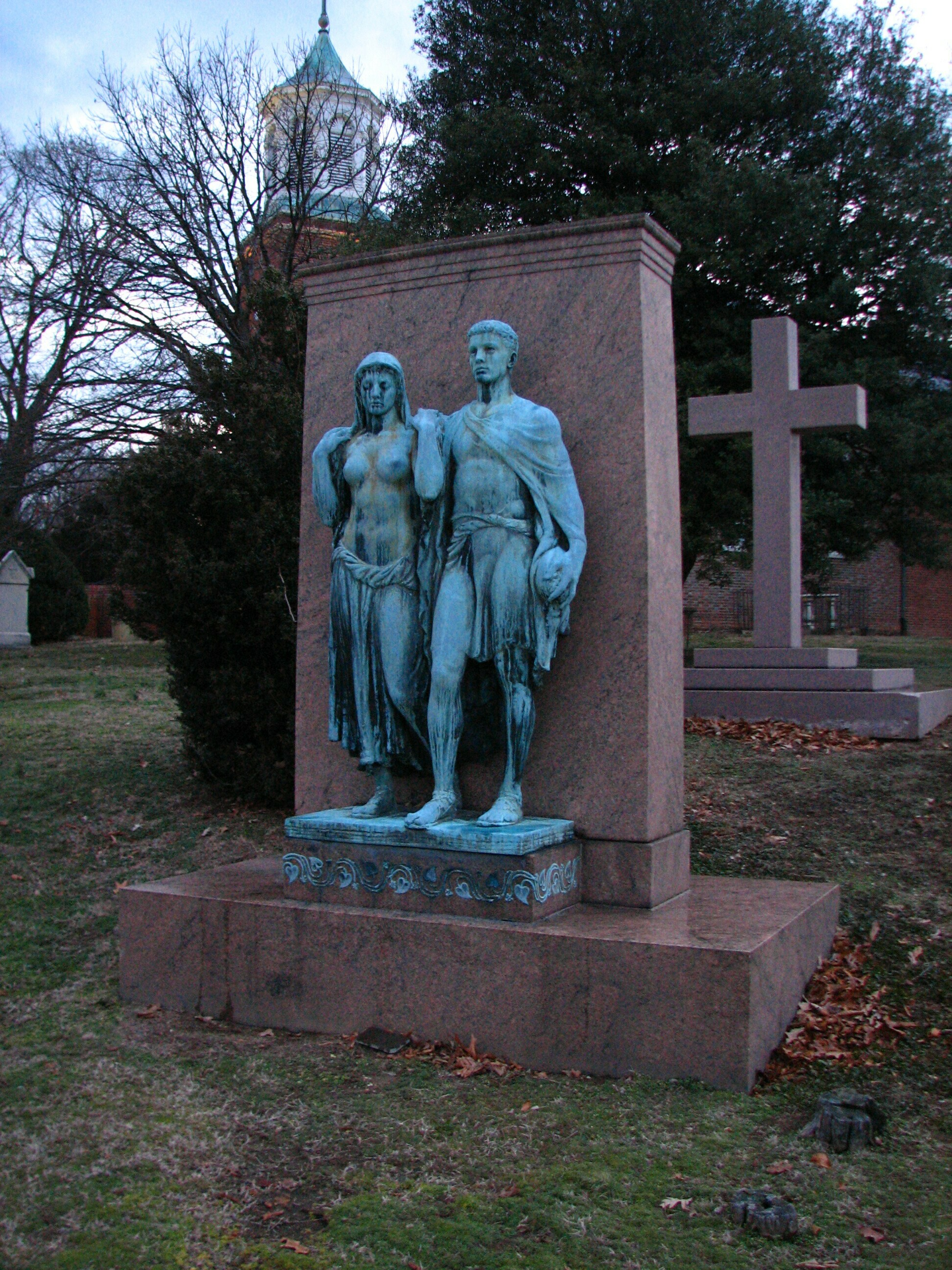
Front

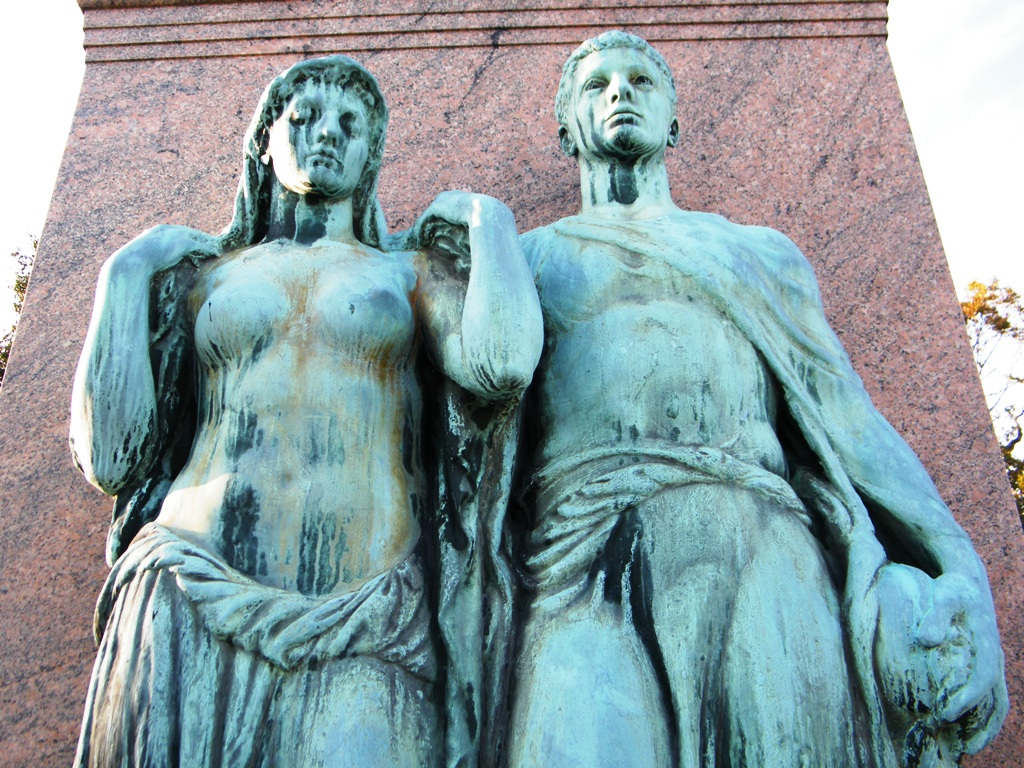
Front

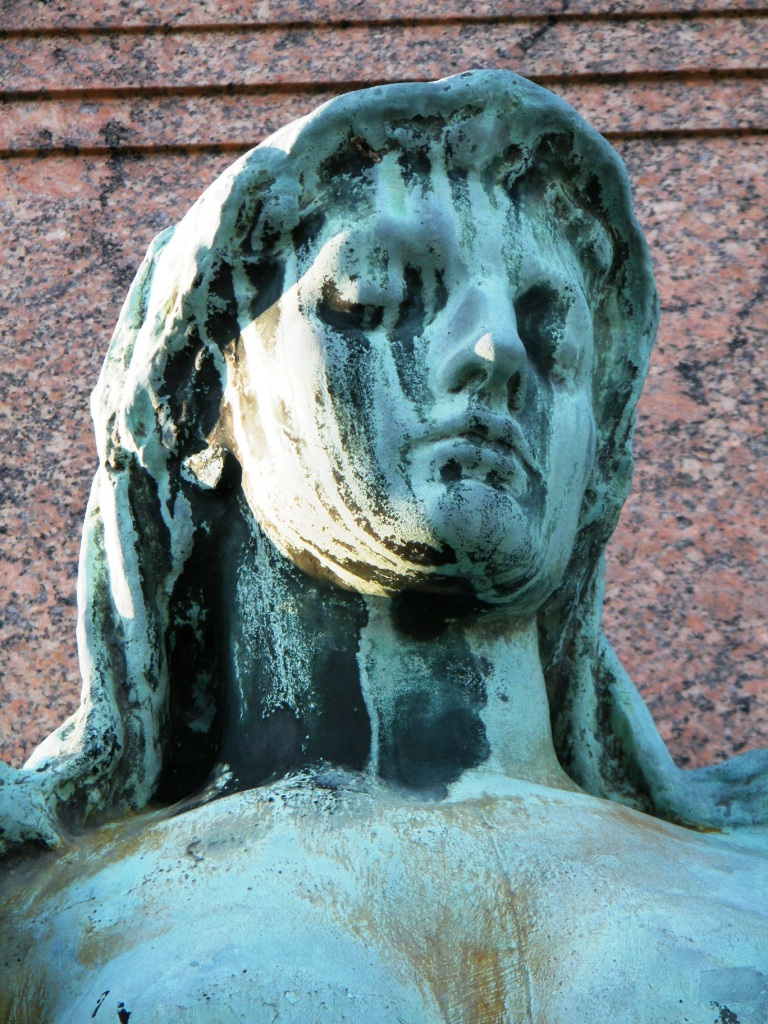
Detail

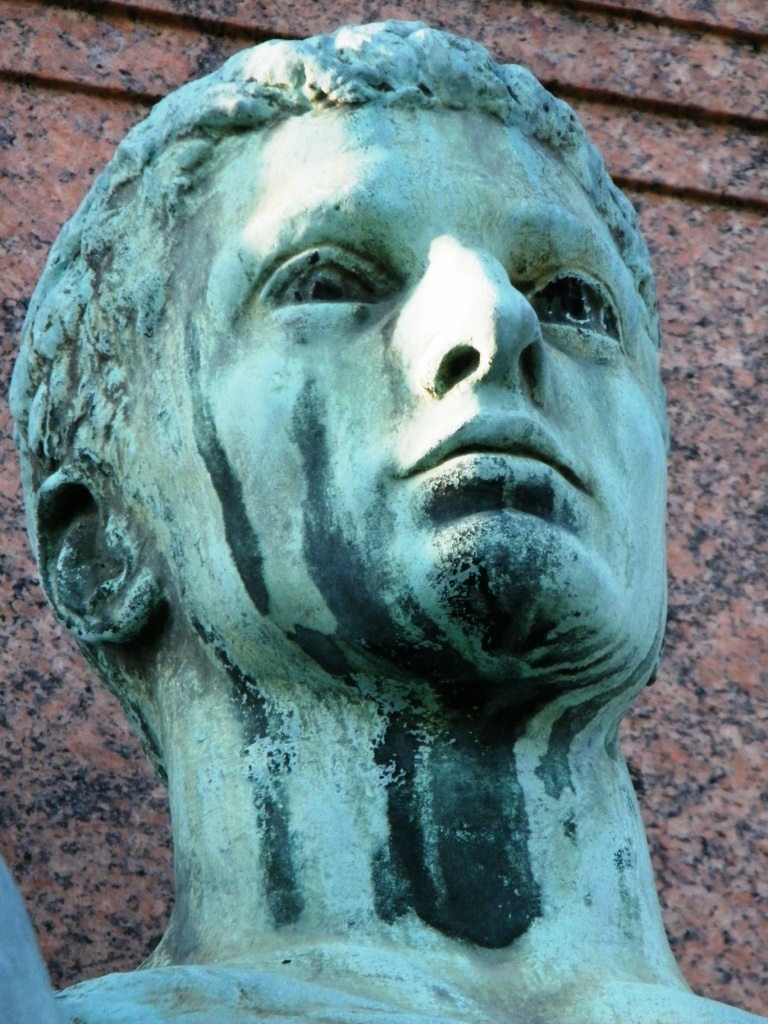
Detail

== Acquisition ==
The sculpture was installed just before or on October 3, 1920.

== Background ==
Frederick Keep was a Washington, D.C. businessman. His wife, Florence, was the sister of Mabel Thorp Boardman, one of the founders of the American Red Cross, and American socialite Josephine Porter Boardman. Her father, William J. Boardman, a lawyer and philanthropist who died August 2, 1915, is also buried in Rock Creek Cemetery.

Florence socialized with U.S. Secretary of State John Hay, Agnes Meyer, Katharine Graham, Ruth Draper, and President William Taft and his wife. A number of Keep's personal belongings were donated to the National Museum of American History by her sister Josephine, including a late 1920s evening dress that was exhibited in the Hall of American Costume from 1964-1973.

== Condition ==
This sculpture was surveyed in 1993 for its condition and was described as needing treatment urgently.

== Sources ==
- James M. Goode, The Outdoor Sculpture of Washington, D.C., Smithsonian Institution Press, 1974, ISBN 0-87474-138-6, p. 343
