= Wynn Bagnall =

Canadian soldier (1890–1931)

Captain Wynn Bagnall MC
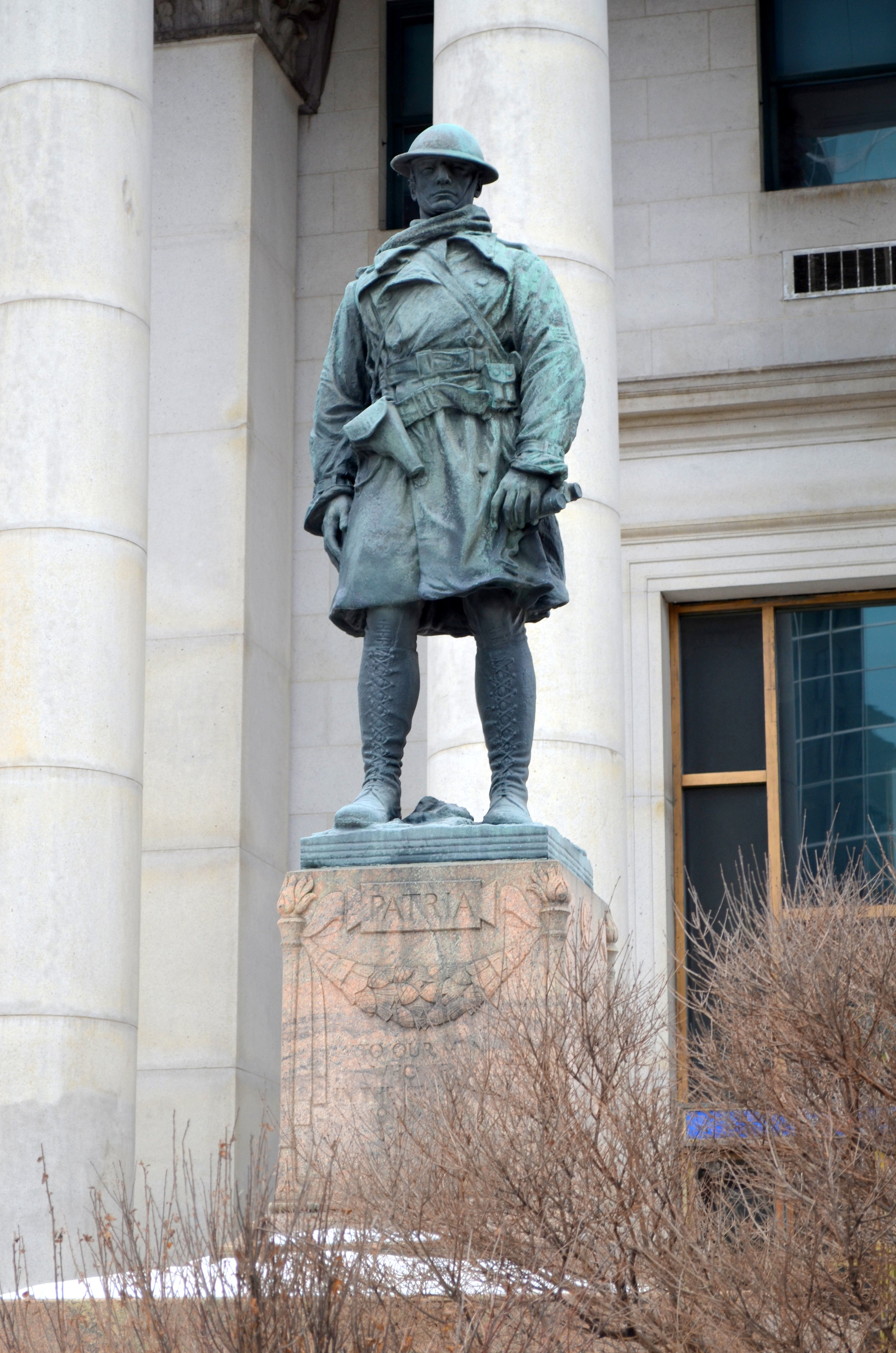
- Statue of Wynn Bagnall by James Earle Fraser
- Born: 10 February 1890; Sunderland, England
- Died: 7 March 1931 (aged 41); New York City, US

Captain Wynn Bagnall MC (10 February 1890 – 7 March 1931), was a Canadian soldier who distinguished himself in World War I. A recipient of the Military Cross, Bagnall's war record was the inspiration behind a statue in Winnipeg, Canada, by James Earle Fraser, designed to honour the heroism of Canadians who had fought and often died. Bagnall was the model for the statue which was dedicated in December 1923 and 'inspired memory and reverence for lost Canadian soldiers in all the years it has stood'. The statue was also described as 'one of the finest memorials yet produced' and won a gold medal for sculpture in New York City in 1925.

On 11 March 1931, Bagnall was buried with full military honours at Cypress Hills Cemetery, Long Island.

== Life ==
Wynn Bagnall was born in Sunderland, England on 10 February 1890, the son of George Rhydero Bagnall, a British banker who died when Wynn Bagnall was seven, and Anne (née Hughes). He was educated as a boarder at Bedford Modern School. After school, in 1906 Bagnall emigrated to Canada to become a rancher in Calgary, returning to England in 1909 and then back to Canada to join the Bank of Montreal as a clerk in July 1910.

At the outbreak of World War I, Bagnall enlisted as a Gunner in the 6th Battery of the Canadian Field Artillery, going to France in 1915. Shortly after arriving in France, he wrote a letter to his old school to express his initial experience of trench warfare:

We are seeing almost continual rain, and the firing line is literally a sea of mud. The trenches in many parts are running streams in spite of the splendid efforts of the engineers, and at times, when duty calls, we have to set our jaws a little firmer, and remember the Great Cause for which we are enduring discomforts and hardships, to refrain from uttering epithets of discontent

In 1916, Bagnall was appointed Lieutenant in the 23rd Battery of the Canadian Field Artillery before being attached to the 5th Battery. In 1917 he was Orderly Officer and then Adjutant in the 2nd Brigade of the Canadian Field Artillery. In March 2018 he was promoted to captain and joined the 58th Battery of the Canadian Field Artillery where for three months he was Acting Major.

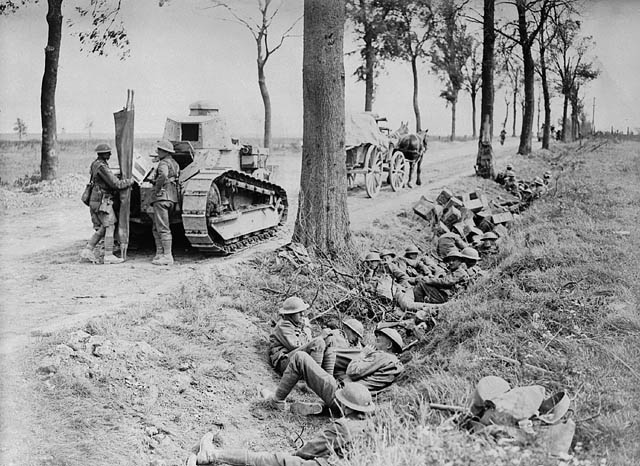
Canadian troops on the Arras to Cambrai Road, 1918

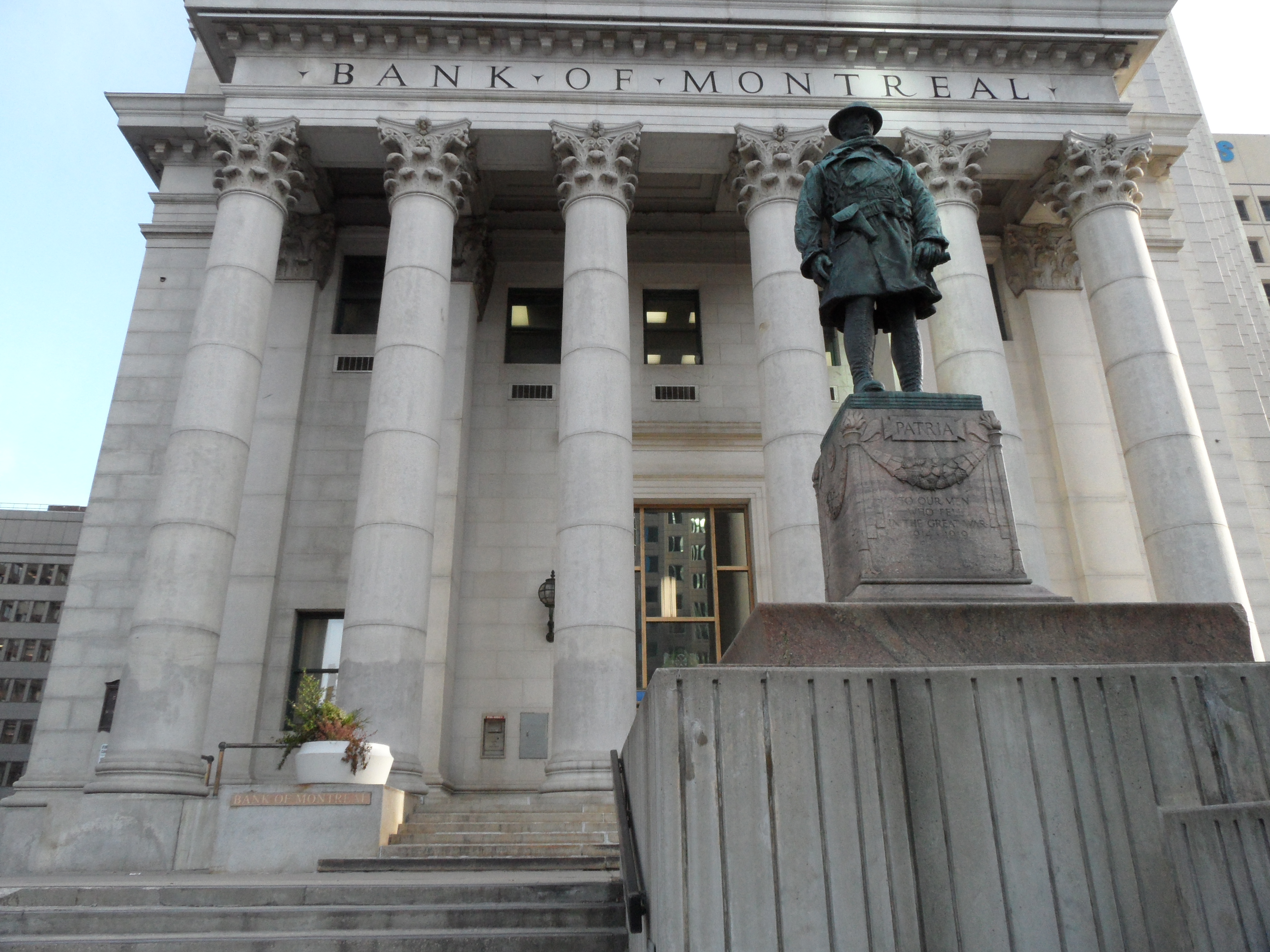
Bank of Montreal Statue

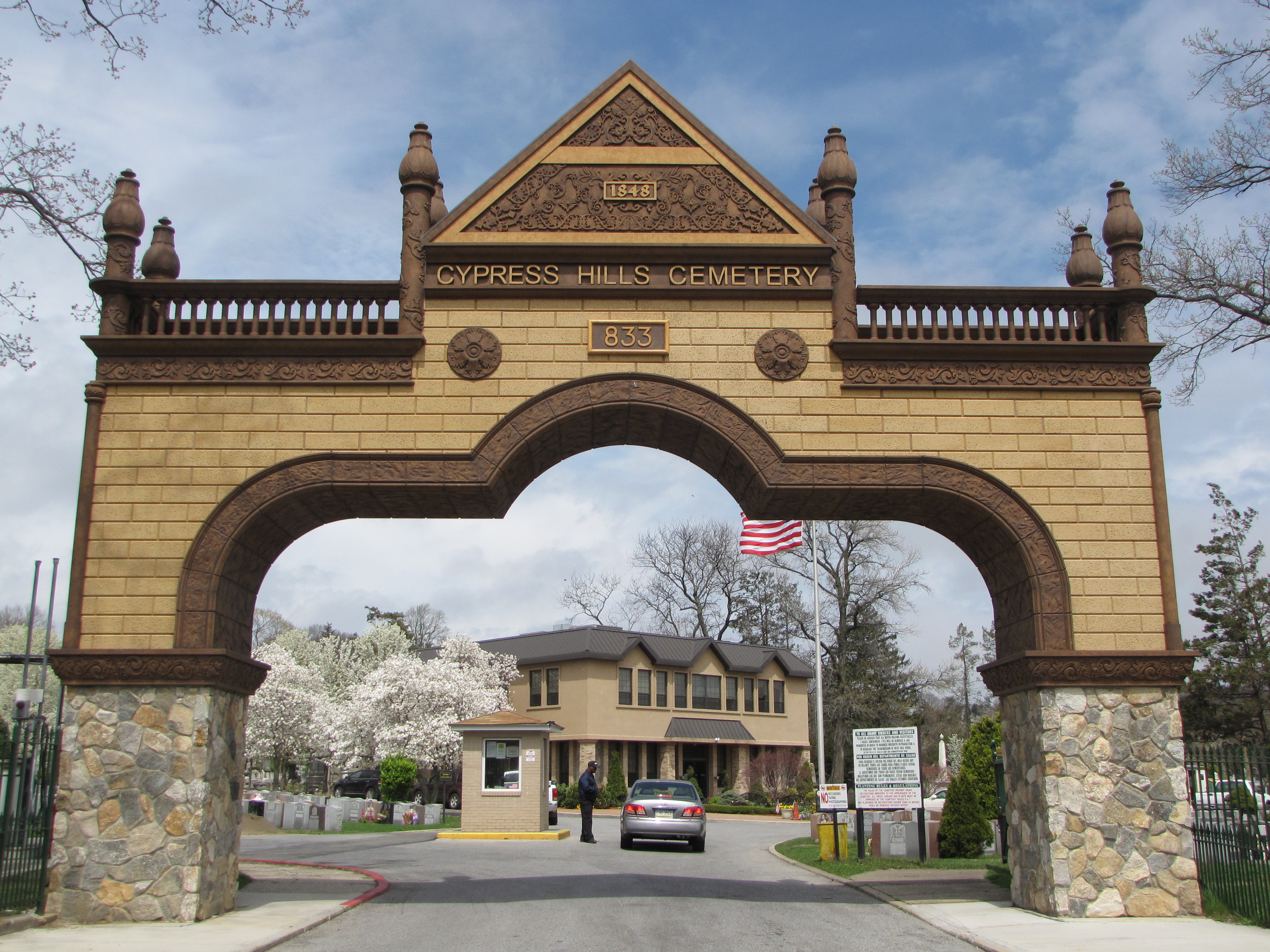
Cypress Hills Cemetery

In total, Bagnall won four medals during World War I including the Military Cross for 'marked gallantry and initiative' during the Second Battle of Cambrai. The citation to his Military Cross read:

Capt. Wynn Bagnall, Can. Fid. Arty., attd. 60th Bty., 14th Bde. For marked gallantry and initiative. On 1st October, 1918, during fighting in suburbs of Cambrai, our infantry were suffering severe casualties from enemy machine guns situated behind a railway embankment. He took forward one gun of his battery to within 500 yards of our posts, in order to enfilade this embankment. Under heavy fire he got the gun into action and succeeded in silencing the machine guns, enabling our line to be slightly advanced

After the war, Bagnall returned to the Bank of Montreal. James Earle Fraser considered Bagnall to be the embodiment of the entire Canadian army during the Great War. As a model and inspiration for his work, Fraser didn't want a private or a general but an officer, and Bagnall had enlisted as a private rising to the rank of Captain through his dedication, determination and courage. In Fraser's own words:

A Canadian Officer posed for the figure. I wanted the statue to be a tribute to the Canadian army-to show a man who had stood the gaff over there as the Canadian had done. I feel that they bore much of the brunt of the fighting and I tried to have the figure representing a man who had done this-and could do it again. The quality I wanted to bring out in the face, is one of power and ruggedness, typical of Canada and the Canadian army

The statue was described as 'one of the finest memorials yet produced' and won a gold medal for sculpture in New York City in 1925. At the granite base of the statue was placed a box containing a signed photograph of Sir Vincent Meredith, President of the Bank of Montreal, a signed photograph of Sir Frederick Williams-Taylor, a signed photograph of Sir James Atkins, Lieutenant-Governor of Manitoba, and the Bank of Montreal Memorial Book. In his biography of James Earle Fraser, A.L. Freundich wrote about the Bagnall statue:

Here is no giant warrior god on a high pedestal, but a man. He is tough, ready for the fight, his feet apart, arms held loosely at his sides but ready. His helmet is just slightly at an angle and, under its brim, his face reflects strength and determination. The folds in the cloth of his trench coat, his pistol and cartridge belt, add to the feeling of resolute readiness for combat

Bagnall moved to New York City in 1920 to continue his career in finance. He lived on Wall Street itself and later on East 55th Street in Manhattan. In the latter years of his life he was associated with S. W. Straus and the Fred F. French Company describing himself as a financial salesman and accountant.

Bagnall married Adelaide A. Clough in 1926 but they divorced in 1930. He died in New York City, on 7 March 1931, aged 41, and was buried on 11 March 1931 with full military honours at Cypress Hills Cemetery, Long Island. He was survived by his mother, Mrs. George Bagnall of Selsey-On-Sea, Sussex, England, together with two sisters and two brothers. His obituary in The New York Times described him as a Canadian War Hero.
