= Second Division Memorial =

Public artwork by James Earle Fraser in Washington, DC

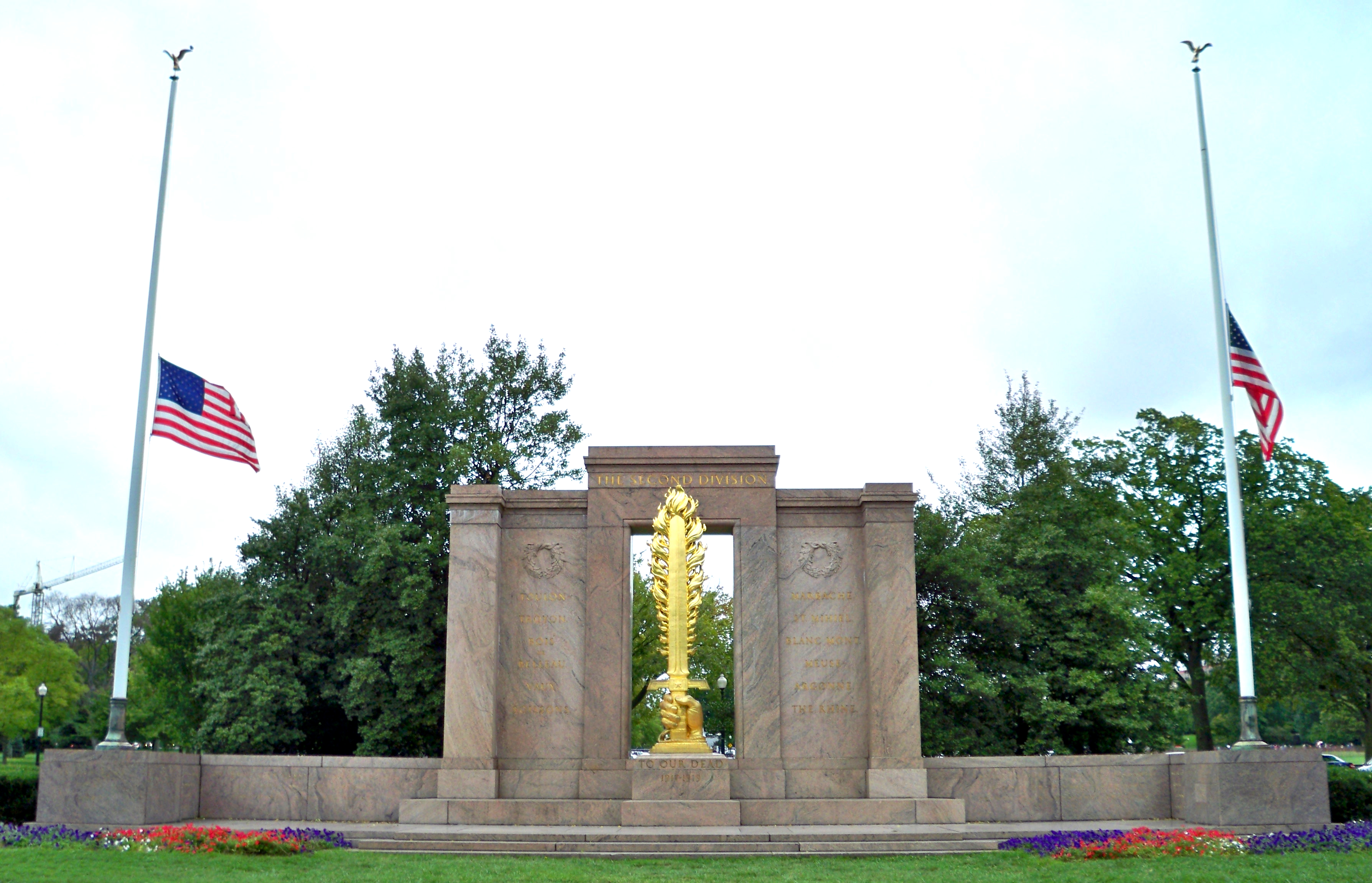
- Second Division Memorial
- Interactive map of Second Division Memorial
- Location: President's Park; Washington, D.C. United States
- Coordinates: 38°53′33″N 77°02′17″W
- Established: 1936
- Governing body: National Park Service

The Second Division Memorial is located in President's Park, between 17th Street Northwest and Constitution Avenue in Washington, DC, United States.

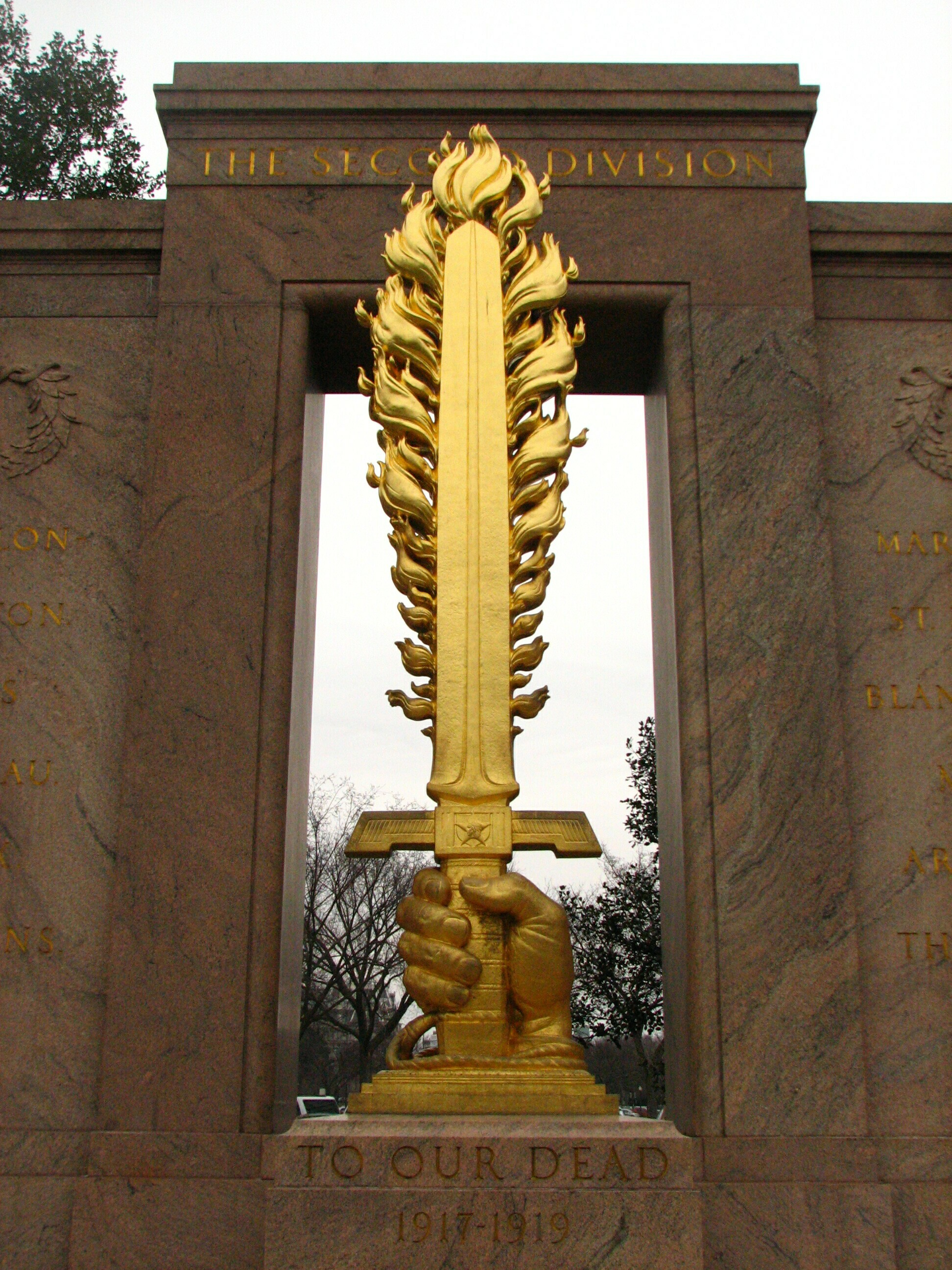
Detail

The Memorial commemorates those who died, while serving in the 2nd Infantry Division of the U. S. Army. The artist was James Earle Fraser. It was dedicated on July 18, 1936, by president Franklin D. Roosevelt.

It was rededicated in 1962, by Gen. Maxwell Taylor, with two wings added for the battle honors of World War II and the Korean War.

The flaming sword symbolizes the defense of Paris from the German advance.

== See also ==
- List of public art in Washington, D.C., Ward 2
