= Heritage (sculpture) =

1935 sculpture by James Earle Fraser

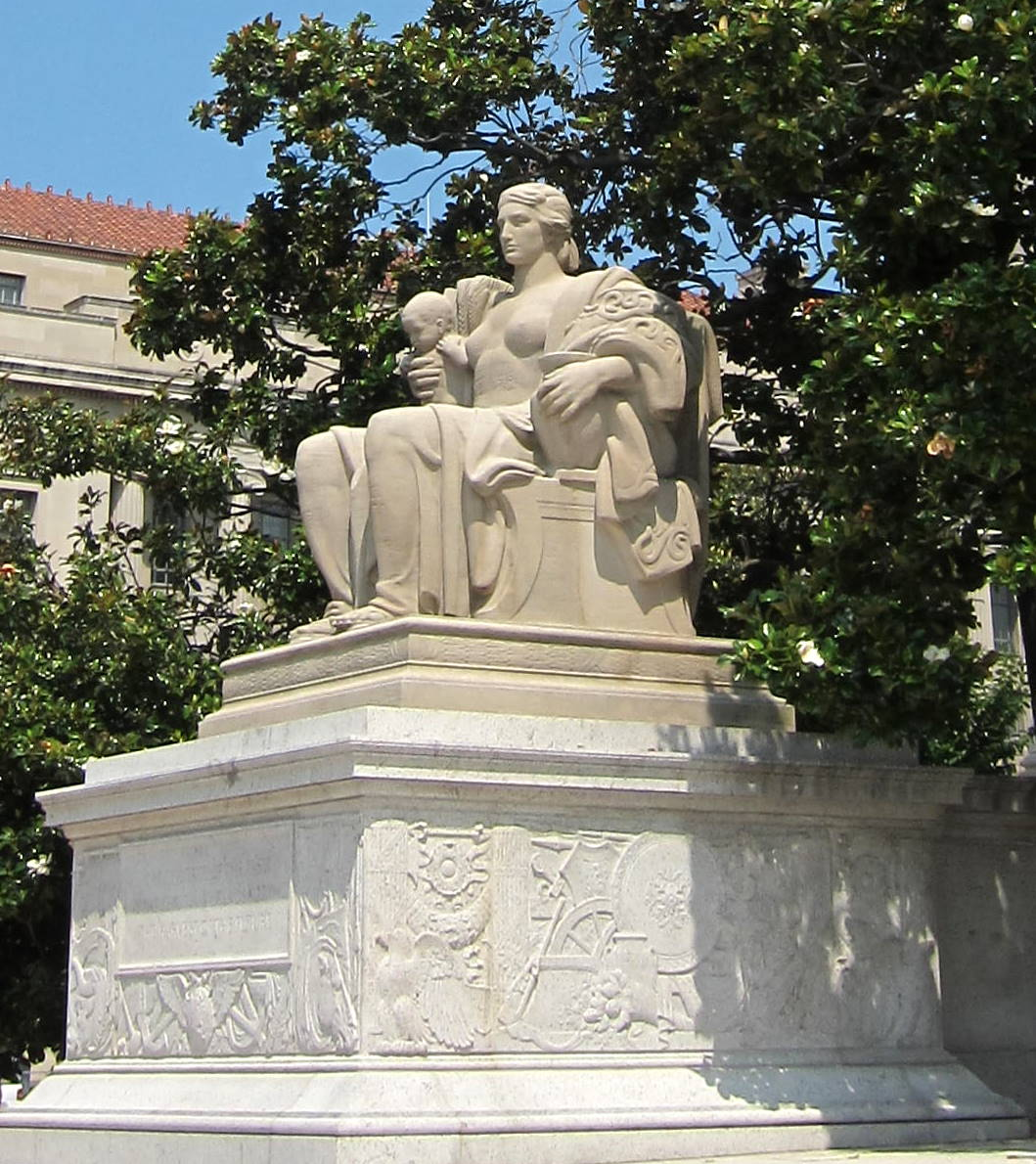
- The sculpture in 2010
- Artist: James Earle Fraser
- Year: 1935
- Type: Sculpture
- Location: Washington, D.C., United States; 38.892305°N 77.023231°W

Heritage is an outdoor 1935 sculpture by American artist James Earle Fraser, installed in front of the National Archives Building in Washington, D.C., United States. Heritage is a companion piece to Guardianship.

The National Archives Foundation's Heritage Award, which recognizes "individuals, corporations, and organizations whose deeds are consistent with the Foundation's mission of educating, enriching, and inspiring a deeper appreciation of our country's heritage", is named after the sculpture.

== See also ==
- 1935 in art
- List of public art in Washington, D.C., Ward 6
