= Patton Monument (West Point) =

Monument at West Point, USA

Coordinates: 41.3915°N 73.958459°W

- United States
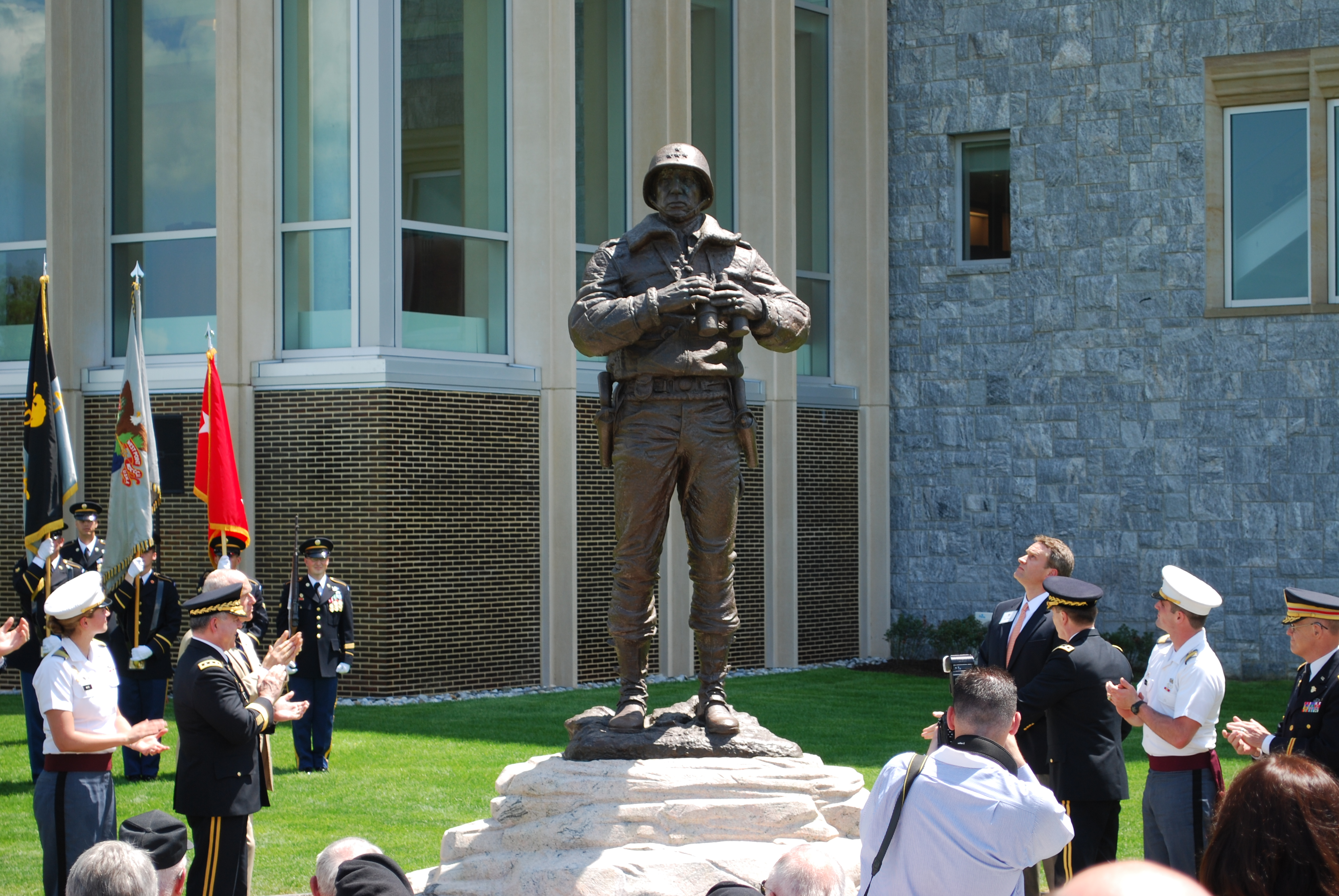
- Patton Monument at West Point
- For General George S. Patton
- Unveiled: 15 May 2009
- Location: near Highland Falls, NY

General George S. Patton, Jr. (Patton Monument) is a bronze statue of George S. Patton, Jr., by James Earle Fraser. It is located at the United States Military Academy.

Patton was a prominent cavalryman during the early 20th century and was a founding father of the US Army's Tank Corps, seeing action in World War I and commanding a tank brigade. He achieved his greatest fame during World War II. He commanded armored forces in North Africa after Operation Torch, then commanded the Seventh Army for the invasion of Sicily. But his greatest fame came as commander of the United States Third Army. After a swift drive across France after the Normandy invasion, his forces made a famous relief of the trapped American forces in the siege of Bastogne during the German Ardennes counteroffensive.

The statue was originally dedicated in 1950 by Patton's widow Beatrice and faced the old Cadet Library. It was briefly placed in storage for the construction of the new library, Jefferson Hall, in 2004. The monument was then rededicated in 2009 in a temporary location near Eisenhower Monument where it remained for the next three years while renovations were completed on the Cadet Library and Bartlett Hall.

Other examples of the statue are at the Charles River Esplanade, Hatch Memorial Shell, Boston, Massachusetts, and at the General Patton Memorial Museum Ettelbruck, Luxembourg.

In the monument's previous position, Patton faced the old Cadet Library. It was often joked that the statue was positioned facing the library with binoculars in the officer's hands so that he might find the building which he neglected to visit as a cadet.

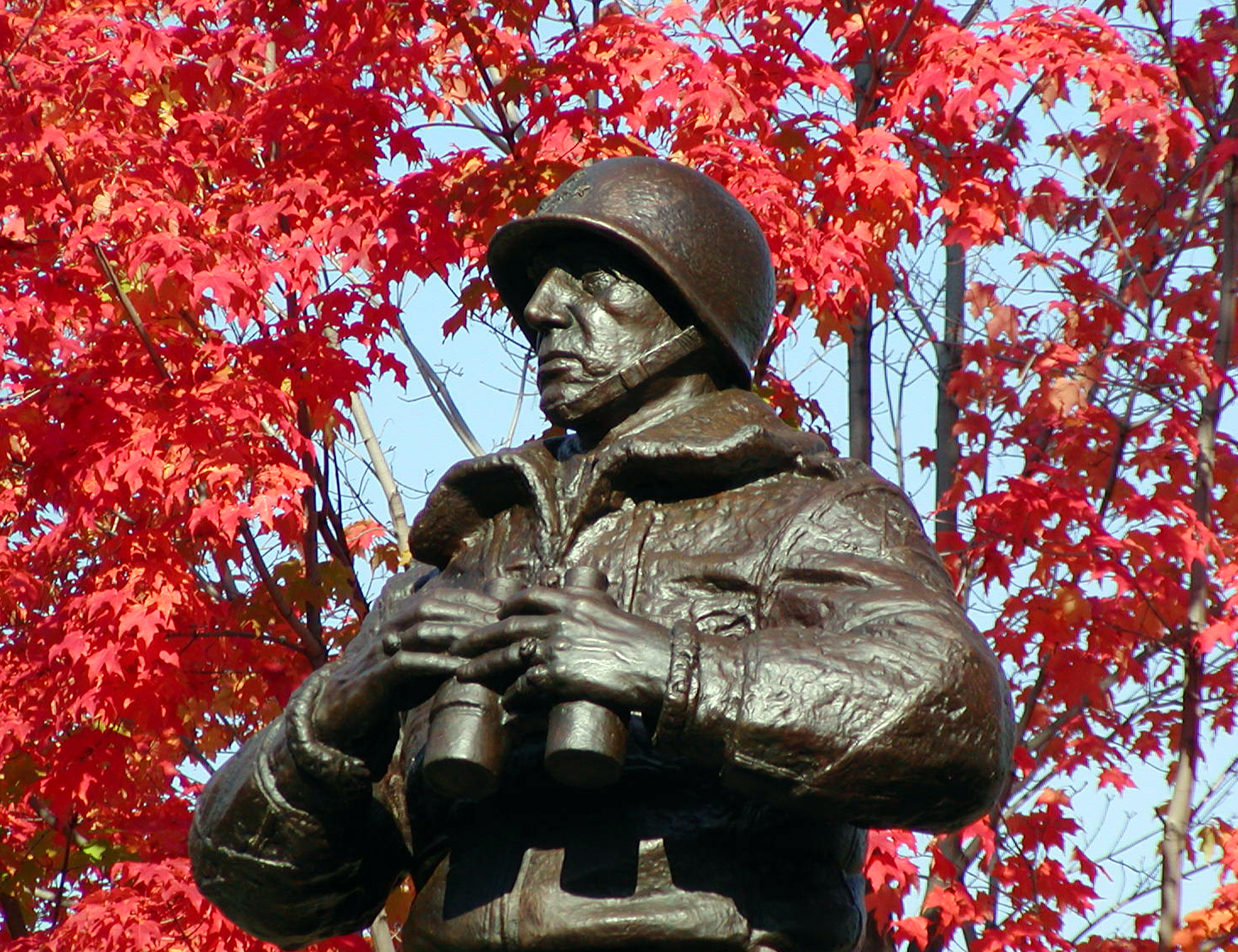
Patton Monument in its original location, circa 2003

== See also ==
- General George Patton Museum, Fort Knox, Kentucky
- General George S. Patton Memorial Museum, Chiriaco Summit, California
