= Guardianship (sculpture) =

1935 sculpture by James Earle Fraser

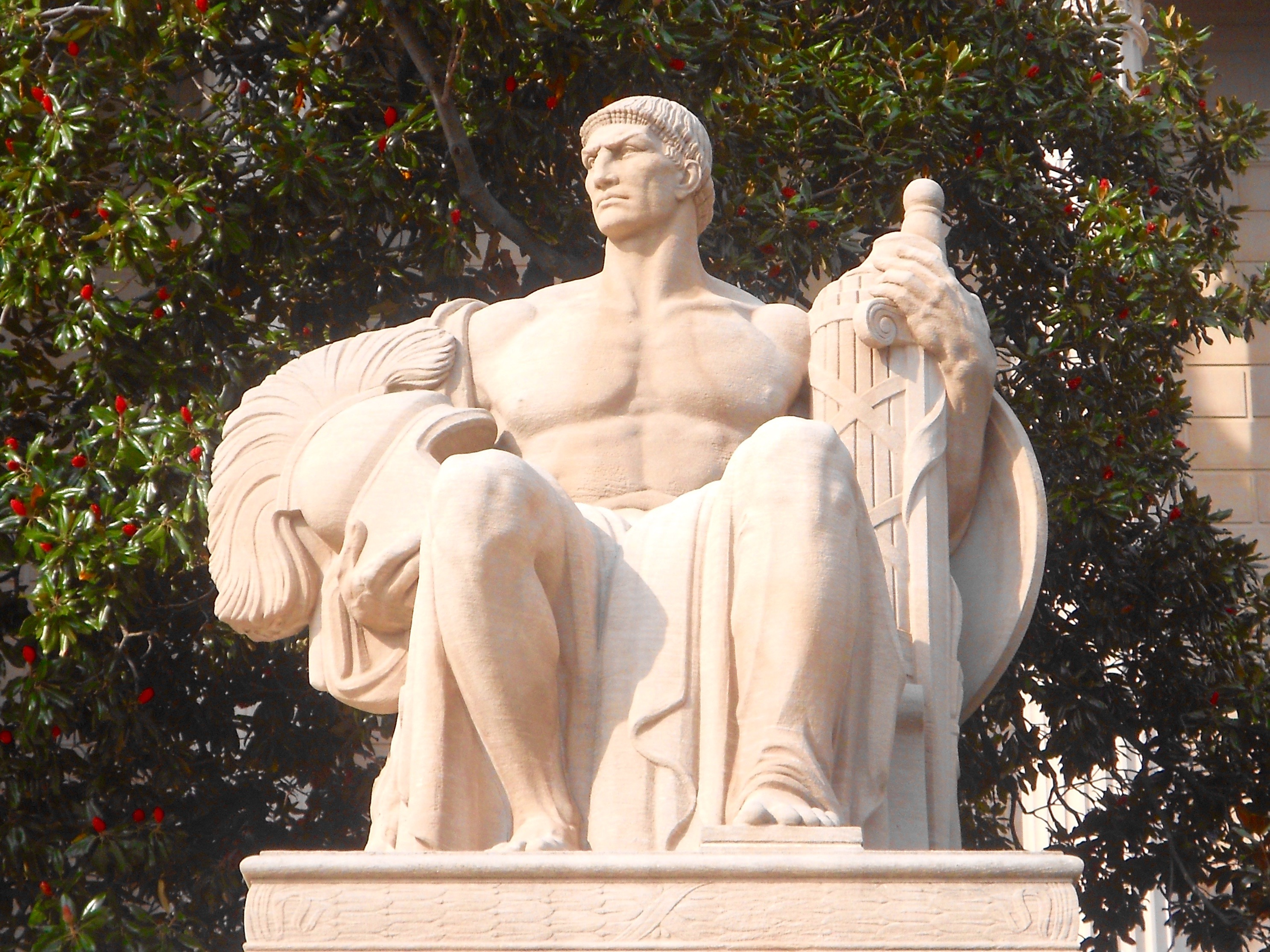
- The sculpture in 2015
- Artist: James Earle Fraser
- Year: 1935
- Type: Sculpture
- Location: Washington, D.C., United States; 38.892305°N 77.022673°W

Guardianship is an outdoor 1935 sculpture by American artist James Earle Fraser, installed in front of the National Archives Building in Washington, D.C., United States. Guardianship is a companion piece to Heritage.

== See also ==
- 1935 in art
- List of public art in Washington, D.C., Ward 6
