= General George Patton Museum of Leadership =

Military museum in Kentucky, U.S.

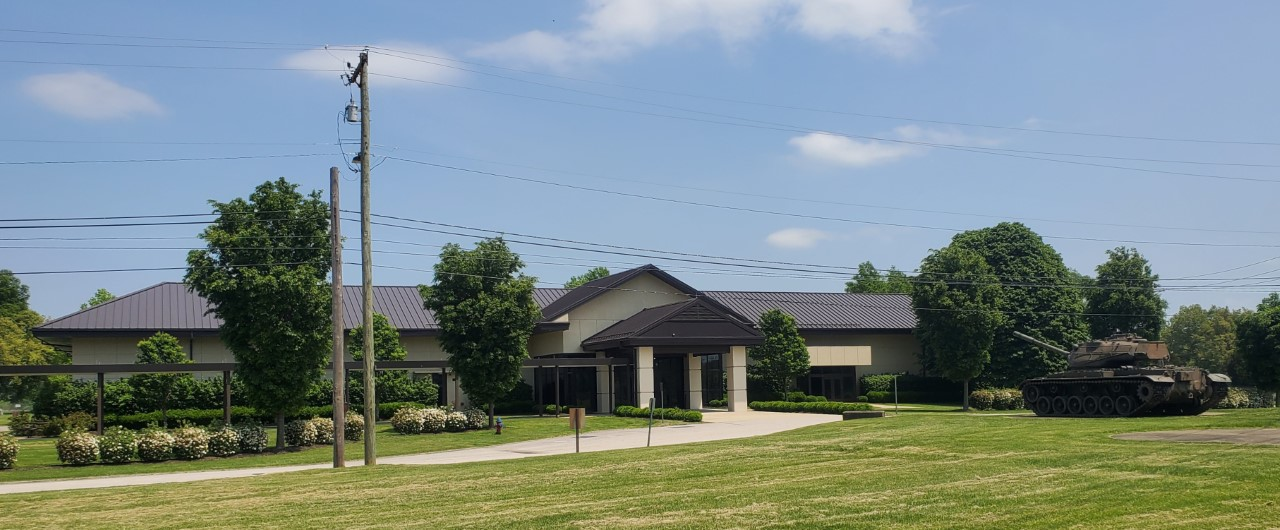
- Former name: Patton Museum of Cavalry and Armor (1972-2011)
- Established: 1948
- Location: Fort Knox, Kentucky
- Coordinates: 37.8965°N 85.9742°W
- Type: History museum
- Public transit access: Highway 31W
- Website: generalpatton.org/about-us

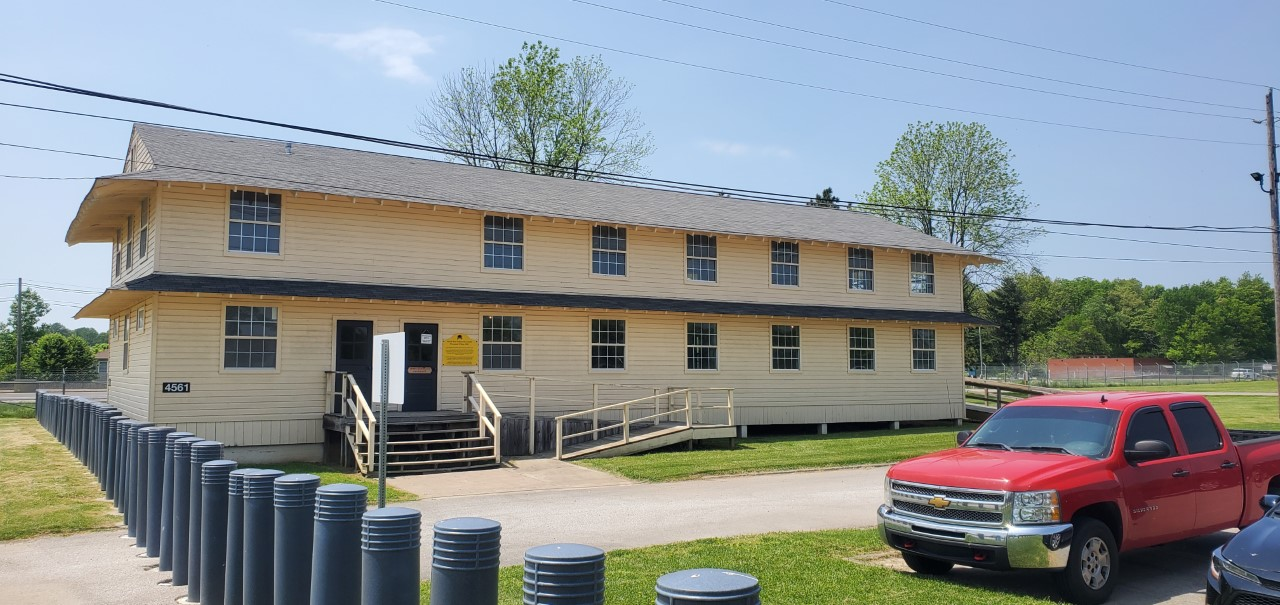
Patton Museum Fort Knox 1940 Barracks Exterior

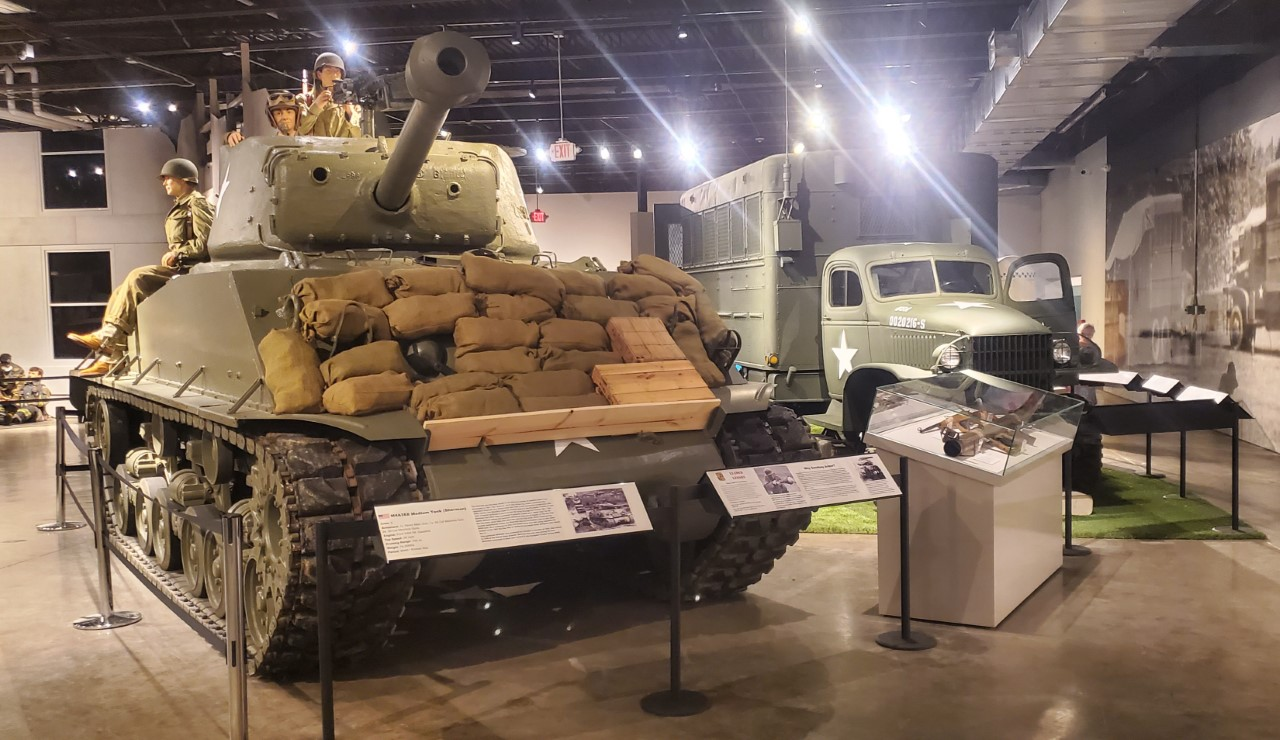
Sherman M4A3E8 Medium Tank and shop van

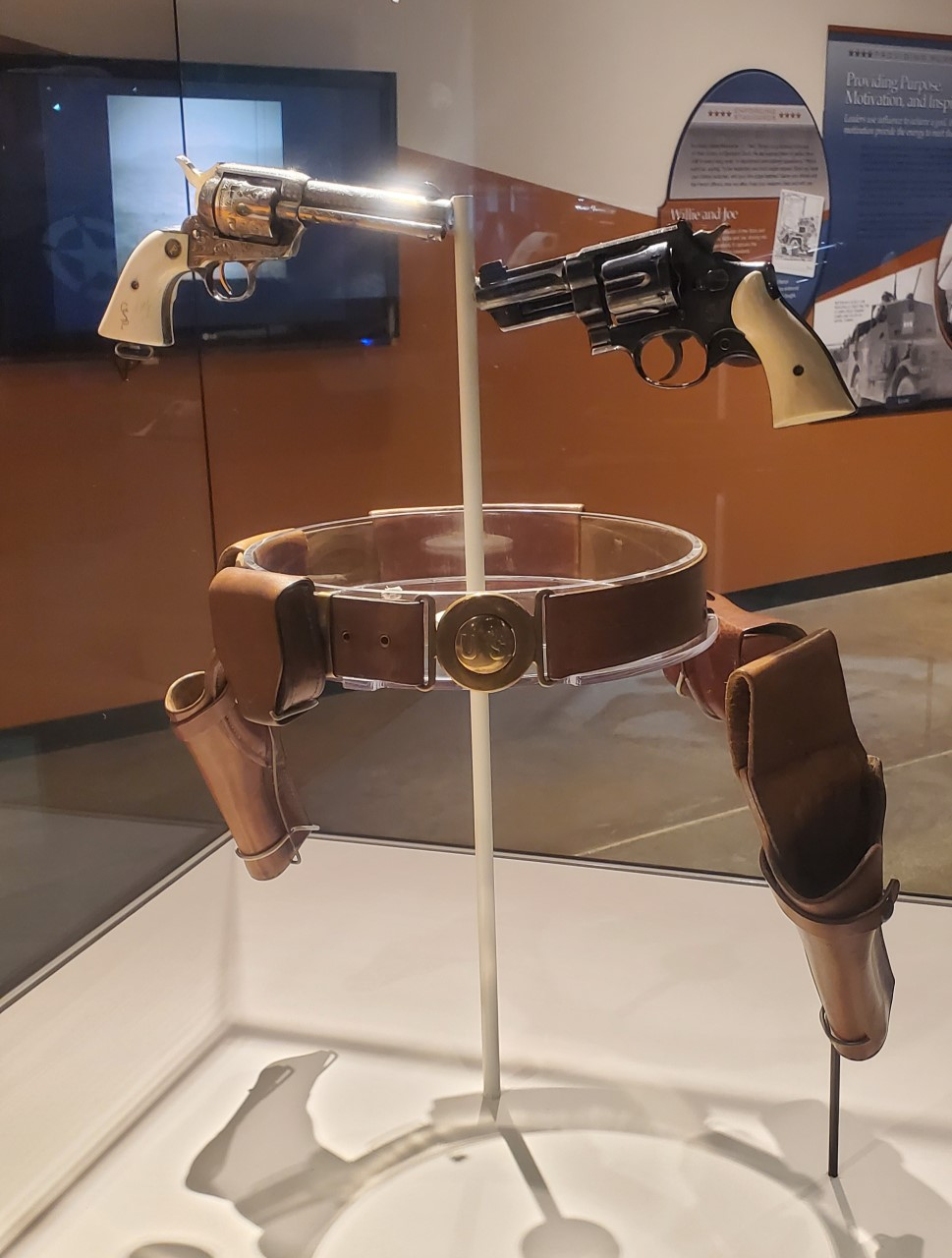
General George S. Patton's Ivory-handled Pistols

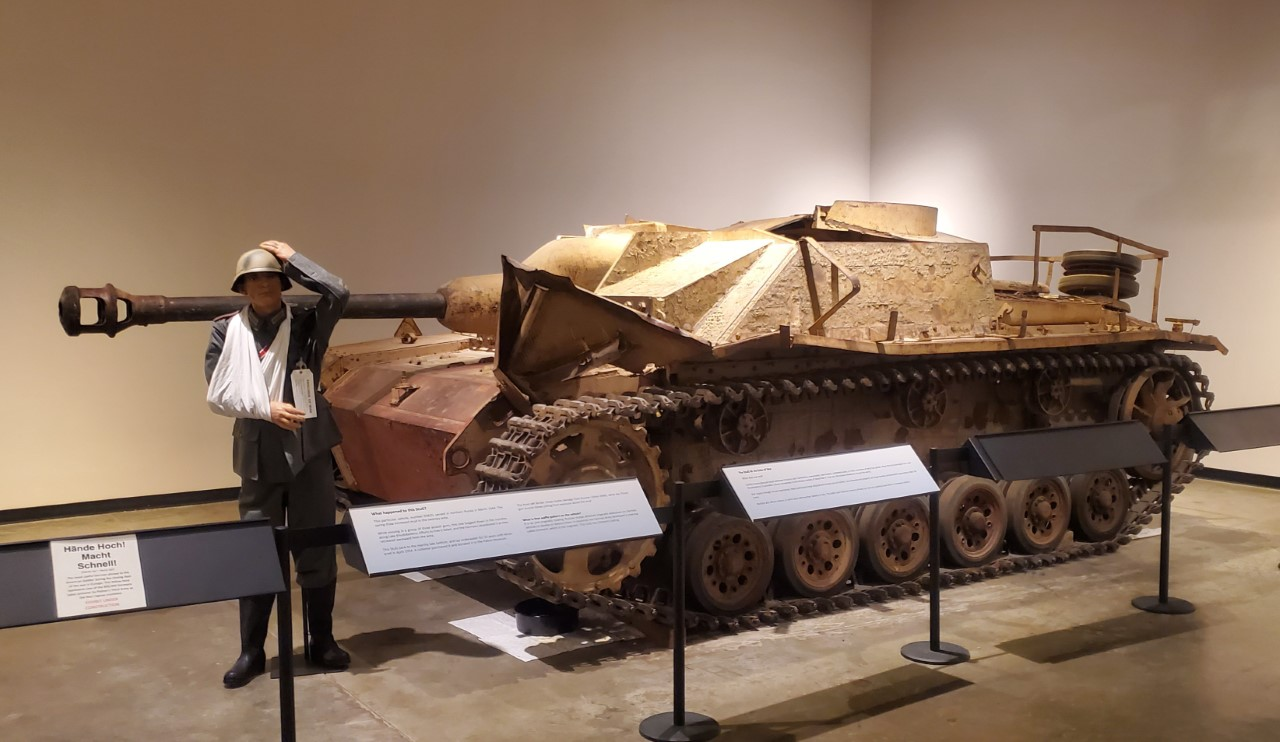
StuG III at Patton Museum

The General George Patton Museum of Leadership is a publicly accessible museum on Fort Knox, Kentucky, dedicated to the memory and life lessons of General George S. Patton, Jr., and the continuing education of Junior Army leaders in the U.S. Army and in particular the Army Reserve Officers' Training Corps. The museum is administered by U.S. Army Cadet Command, Fort Knox and U.S. Army Training and Doctrine Command as part of the Center for Military History.

== History ==
The museum began as housing and storage for many captured enemy military vehicles and equipment sent to Fort Knox during World War II by Patton's Third United States Army for study. Following Patton's death in 1945, many of his personal military vehicles and equipment began to accumulate there, leading to the eventual establishment of 'The Patton Museum' in 1948. This makes it one of the longest continually operating Museums in the United States Army's Center For Military History Army Museum Enterprise. The museum collection was eventually moved to the present 45,000 sq. ft building constructed in 1972 and renamed the 'Patton Museum of Cavalry and Armor'. Further improvements and updates were completed in 1992 all without cost to the U.S. Government by the privately funded Cavalry and Armor Foundation, now called the Patton Museum Foundation.

== Operating hours ==
Museum entry is free and open to the public Tuesday to Saturday, 9:00am to 4:30pm (Eastern Standard Time) excluding federal holidays.

== Exhibits ==
Perhaps best known prior to 2012 for its large collection of tanks, many of these larger items accompanied the move of the Armor school and are now part of the U.S. Army Armor and Cavalry Collection at Fort Benning, Georgia.

== See also ==
- List of attractions and events in the Louisville metropolitan area
- General George S. Patton Memorial Museum – Biographical museum in Chiriaco Summit, California
- Patton Monument (West Point) – Monument at West Point, USA
- George S. Patton – United States Army general (1885–1945)
- George Patton IV – United States Army general (1923–2004) and son of George Patton
- United States Army Ordnance Training Support Facility – Military museum in Fort Lee, Virginia, US
