= Edwin Graves =

Edwin Graves may refer to:

- Edwin Cyrus Graves (1868–1936), Canadian politician
- Edwin Graves (rower) (1897–1986), American rower

== See also ==
- Edward O. Graves (1843–1909), American banker, Chief of the Bureau of Engraving and Printing
- Ed Graves (1917–1980), American film art director
- Edward Grove (1852–1932), British Army general
- Edward Grover (1932–2016), American actor
