= Basket of deplorables =

Hillary Clinton 2016 campaign speech phrase

"Basket of deplorables" is a pejorative phrase from a 2016 US presidential election campaign speech delivered by Democratic nominee Hillary Clinton on September 9, 2016, at a campaign fundraising event. She used the phrase to describe half of the supporters of her opponent, Republican nominee Donald Trump, saying they're "racist, sexist, homophobic, xenophobic, Islamophobic". The next day, she expressed regret for "saying half", while insisting that Trump had deplorably amplified "hateful views and voices".

The Trump campaign repeatedly used the phrase against Clinton during and after the 2016 presidential election. Many Trump supporters adopted the "deplorable" moniker for themselves in reappropriation. Some journalists and political analysts questioned whether this speech played a role in the election's outcome. In her 2017 book What Happened, Clinton herself said that her comments on the "basket of deplorables" were a factor in her electoral loss.

== Background ==
Throughout her presidential campaign, Hillary Clinton expressed her concerns regarding Donald Trump and his supporters. The New York Times and CNN cited Clinton's earlier articulation of similar ideas to the phrase in her August 25, 2016, campaign speech at a rally in Reno, Nevada. In that speech, Clinton had criticized Trump's campaign for using "racist lies" and allowing the alt-right to gain prominence, claiming that Trump was "taking hate groups mainstream and helping a radical fringe take over the Republican Party". Clinton also criticized Trump for choosing Steve Bannon as his chief executive officer, especially given Bannon's role as the executive chair of the far-right news website Breitbart News. Clinton read various headlines from the site, including "Would You Rather Your Child Had Feminism or Cancer?" and "Hoist It High and Proud: The Confederate Flag Proclaims a Glorious Heritage". On that same day, Clinton posted a video on Twitter depicting white supremacists supporting Donald Trump. Within the video is a CNN interview wherein Trump initially declined to disavow white nationalist David Duke.

During campaign fundraisers in August 2016, Clinton reportedly explained her divide and conquer approach to courting Republican voters by putting Trump supporters into two "baskets": everyday Republicans whom she would target for votes, and the alt-right crowd. During a September 8, 2016, interview on Israel's Channel 2, Clinton said: "You can take Trump supporters and put them in two big baskets. They are what I would call the deplorables — you know, the racists and the haters, and the people who are drawn because they think somehow he's going to restore an America that no longer exists".

== Speech ==
At an LGBT campaign fundraising event in New York City on September 9, Clinton gave a speech and said the following:

I know there are only 60 days left to make our case – and don't get complacent; don't see the latest outrageous, offensive, inappropriate comment and think, "Well, he's done this time". We are living in a volatile political environment.

You know, to just be grossly generalistic, you could put half of Trump's supporters into what I call the basket of deplorables. (Laughter/applause) Right? (Laughter/applause) They're racist, sexist, homophobic, xenophobic, Islamophobic – you name it. And unfortunately, there are people like that. And he has lifted them up. He has given voice to their websites that used to only have 11,000 people – now have 11 million. He tweets and retweets their offensive hateful mean-spirited rhetoric. Now, some of those folks – they are irredeemable, but thankfully, they are not America.

But the "other" basket – the other basket – and I know because I look at this crowd I see friends from all over America here: I see friends from Florida and Georgia and South Carolina and Texas and – as well as, you know, New York and California – but that "other" basket of people are people who feel the government has let them down, the economy has let them down, nobody cares about them, nobody worries about what happens to their lives and their futures; and they're just desperate for change. It doesn't really even matter where it comes from. They don't buy everything he says, but – he seems to hold out some hope that their lives will be different. They won't wake up and see their jobs disappear, lose a kid to heroin, feel like they're in a dead-end. Those are people we have to understand and empathize with as well.

— Hillary Clinton, CBS News

== Clinton response ==
The following day Clinton expressed regret for "saying half", while insisting that Trump had deplorably amplified "hateful views and voices". At the second presidential debate in October 2016, after Trump mentioned the speech in a response to James Carter, debate moderator Anderson Cooper asked Clinton: "How can you unite a country if you've written off tens of millions of Americans?" Clinton responded to Cooper's question by saying: "My argument is not with his supporters, it's with him and the hateful, divisive campaign he has run".

On October 20, 2016, during the 71st Alfred E. Smith Memorial Foundation Dinner, Clinton joked about the phrase, telling the guests: "I just want to put you all in a basket of adorables".

=== Clinton campaign ===
Clinton's campaign pointed to a series of polls that showed that some of Trump's supporters held negative views toward Latinos, African Americans, and Muslims. Clinton's campaign used the incident to try to force Trump's campaign members to denounce its extreme supporters. For example, after Mike Pence refused to call David Duke "deplorable", Clinton's running mate Tim Kaine accused Pence of enabling racism and xenophobia.

== Trump response ==
Donald Trump criticized Clinton's remark as insulting to his supporters. In a rally at Des Moines, Trump stated: "While my opponent slanders you as deplorable and irredeemable, I call you hardworking American patriots who love your country". During the rest of the election, Trump invited "deplorable Americans" on stage. For example, at a rally in Miami, Florida, on September 16, 2016, Trump parodied musical Les Misérables with the title Les Déplorables under the song "Do You Hear the People Sing?". Trump also used the label against Clinton in an advertisement, which claimed that Clinton herself is deplorable because she "viciously demoniz[es] hard working people like you". On November 8, 2017, one year after the election, Trump thanked the "deplorables" for his victory.

=== Trump campaign ===
Mike Pence responding to Clinton's comments

Others in Trump's campaign responded negatively to the statement. Trump's running mate Mike Pence stated in a Capitol Hill meeting: "For Hillary Clinton to express such disdain for millions of Americans is one more reason that disqualifies her to serve in the highest office". Kellyanne Conway, Trump's campaign manager, had issued a statement on Twitter, claiming: "One day after promising to be aspirational & uplifting, Hillary insults millions of Americans".

Meanwhile, Roger Stone and Donald Trump Jr. posted a parody movie poster of The Expendables on Twitter and Instagram titled "The Deplorables", which included Pepe the Frog's face among those of members of the Trump family and other right-wing figures.

In the final months of the election, the Trump campaign released official merchandise with the word "deplorable".

=== Trump supporters ===
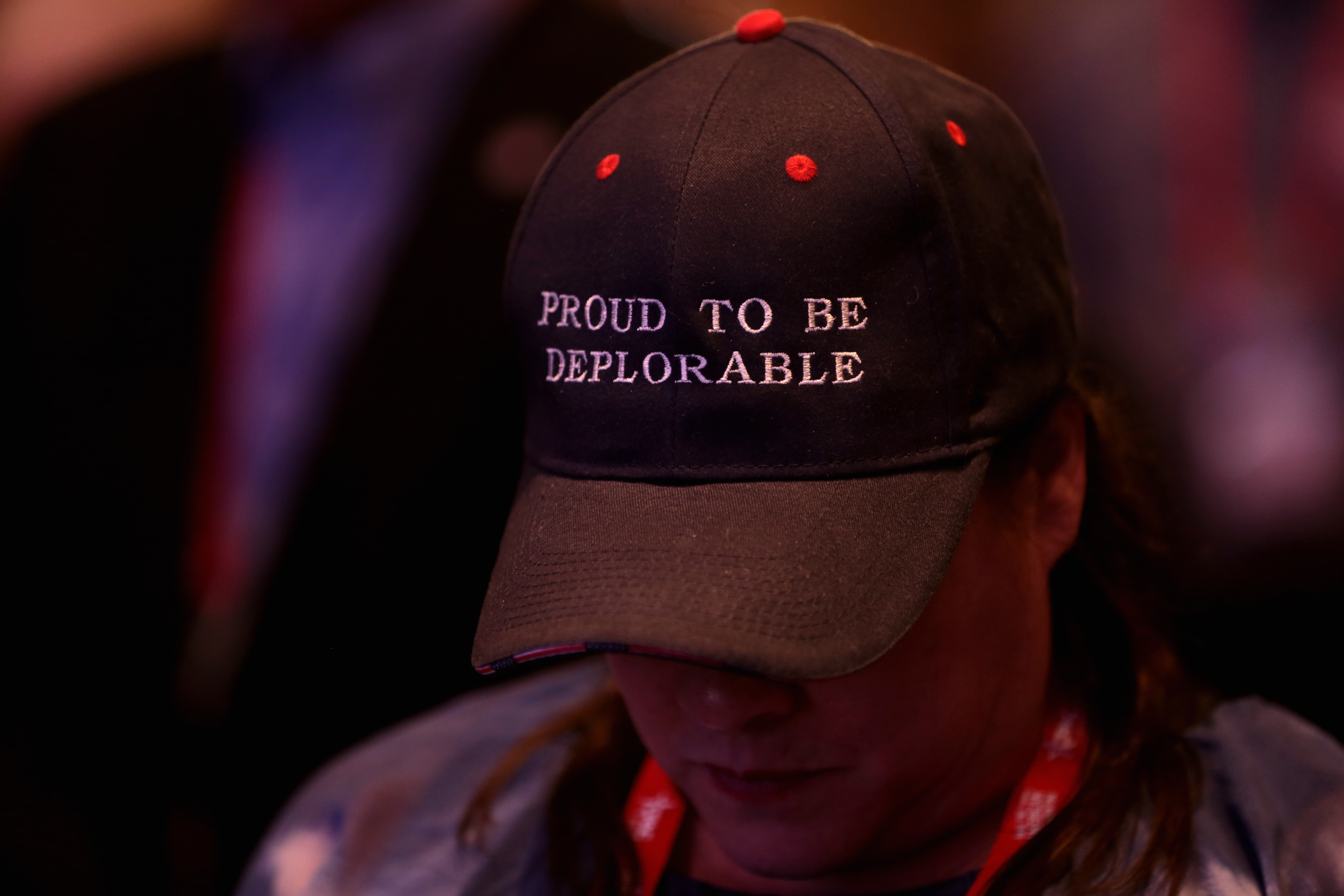
Trump supporter at the Conservative Political Action Conference in 2018, wearing a hat with the phrase "Proud to be deplorable"

During and after the election, the "deplorables" nickname was reappropriated by many Trump supporters. Weeks before Trump's inauguration, various celebrations were held using the word "deplorable". One notable celebration was DeploraBall, which was celebrated by Trump supporters and several members of the right at the National Press Building from January 19 to 20, 2017.

== Analysis ==
The day after Clinton's speech, some political analysts compared the statement to Mitt Romney's "47% gaffe" in 2012. Politico's Rich Lowry describes conservatives' interpretation of Clinton's use of the term as "an unfair, disparaging term for people who believe reasonable but politically incorrect things (immigration should be restricted, NFL players should stand during the national anthem, All Lives Matter, etc.)".

After the election, Diane Hessan, who had been hired by the Clinton campaign to track undecided voters, wrote in The Boston Globe that "all hell broke loose" after the "basket of deplorables" comment, which prompted what she saw as the largest shift of undecided voters towards Trump. Political scientist Charles Murray said, in a post-election interview with Sam Harris, that because the comment helped get Donald Trump elected, it had "changed the history of the world, and he [Haidt] may very well be right. That one comment by itself may have swung enough votes, it certainly was emblematic of the disdain with which the New Upper Class looks at mainstream Americans".

In an interview with CNN on December 4, 2016, Hillary Clinton's campaign manager Robby Mook said that the statement "definitely could have alienated" her voters. Meanwhile, Courtney Weaver of Financial Times believed that Clinton's comment had no effect on the election, stating: "To argue that one word cost Mrs Clinton the election is foolish". However, Weaver acknowledged that the statement "did not hurt her opponent". James Taranto of The Wall Street Journal wrote that Clinton only stated that she regretted saying half without indicating whether she underestimated or overestimated.

Spectator columnist Charles Moore compared the impact of the statement to that of British left-winger Nye Bevan's comments disparaging British Conservative Party members as "lower than vermin" in 1948. Moore noted that these remarks sparked a similar outrage and led to the formation of the "Vermin Club".

Some Trump opponents turned the phrase against the Trump administration. For example Time writer Darlena Cunha opined that several members nominated for Trump's cabinet were a "basket of deplorables" spreading racism, Islamophobia, and antisemitism.

In her 2017 book What Happened, Clinton said that her comments describing half of Trump's supporters as a "basket of deplorables" were a factor in her electoral loss, calling it a "political gift" for Trump.
