= General Grove =

General Grove may refer to:

- Coleridge Grove (1839–1920), British Army major general
- Edward Grove (1852–1932), British Army brigadier general
- Marmaduke Grove (1878–1954), Chilean Air Force general
