= Holtzclaw =

Holtzclaw is a surname. Notable people with the surname include:

- Bill Holtzclaw (born 1964), American politician
- Daniel Holtzclaw (born 1986), American former police officer and convicted serial rapist
- Henry J. Holtzclaw (1897–1969), United States Department of the Treasury official
- James Holtzclaw, American politician
- James T. Holtzclaw (1833–1893), American lawyer, railroad commissioner, and Confederate States Army general
- William Henry Holtzclaw, educator and founder of Utica Institute in Mississippi
