= Peter H. Daly =

American government official

Peter H Daly
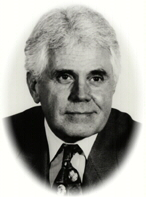

Director of the Bureau of Engraving and Printing
- In office 1988 - 1995
- President: Ronald Reagan; George H.W Bush; Bill Clinton
- Preceded by: Robert J. Leuver
- Succeeded by: Larry E. Rolufs

Personal details
- Born: January 30, 1941; Perth Amboy, New Jersey
- Died: November 2, 2017 (aged 76)

Peter H. Daly (January 30, 1941 - November 2, 2017) was an official in the United States Department of the Treasury who was Director of the Bureau of Engraving and Printing from 1988 to 1995.

== Biography ==
Peter H. Daly was born in Perth Amboy, New Jersey on January 30, 1941. He attended Villanova University, receiving a bachelor's degree in 1963.

Daly joined the United States Department of the Treasury in 1965, working in the Office of Policy Planning and later in the Savings Bond Division. In 1968, he joined the Bureau of Engraving and Printing, working in labor relations, and later becoming the first chief of the Human Resource Development Division. He later became Assistant to the Director and Chief of the Office of Planning and Policy Analysis. He was then Deputy Director of the U.S. Savings Bond program.

In 1983, Daly became Deputy Director of the Bureau of Engraving and Printing. He became Director of the Bureau of Engraving and Printing in 1988, holding that office until 1995. He represented the U.S. government in almost every region of the world at conferences and joint policy groups, he chaired a 14-member international financial research group, and served in Russia and eastern Europe with the Financial Services Volunteer Corps. He served as voluntary Chairman of the Advisory Board for Grandma's Houses, a group of non-profit facilities that care for abused, neglected, indigent or otherwise at-risk children and the elderly in Washington, DC.

In 1995, Daly moved to the Office of the United States Secretary of the Treasury as a senior adviser. During this time, he was appointed to the President's Commission on Critical Infrastructure Protection to study counter-terrorism issues related to the U.S. Banking and Finance sector.

Daly retired from government service in 1998. He served as national security advisor for Booz Allen & Hamilton and a program consultant for Forum Corporation. He served as a frequent lecturer at the John F. Kennedy School of Government at Harvard and accepted an appointment as a research associate at Harvard's Center for Information Policy, where he published two research papers regarding Information Technology's influence on national security and on U.S social structures.

He is co-author of The First 90 Days In Government published by the Harvard Business School Press. His numerous professional articles appeared in a wide variety of national publications.

Government offices
Preceded by Robert J. Leuver	Director of the Bureau of Engraving and Printing; 1988–1995	Succeeded by Larry E. Rolufs
