= George B. McCartee =

Official in the United States Department of the Treasury, 1832-1903

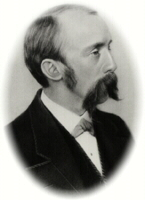
George B. McCartee

George B. McCartee (1832–1903) was an official in the United States Department of the Treasury who served as Chief of the Bureau of Engraving and Printing from 1869 to 1876.

== Biography ==
George B. McCartee was born in 1832 in New York City and raised in New York.

McCartee worked in various business interests in New York until moving to Iowa to work as a railway superintendent. He settled in Salem, New York in 1858, becoming manager of a steam mill.

In 1859, McCartee moved to Washington, D.C. to become private secretary to United States Secretary of the Treasury Howell Cobb. He was later superintendent of the Treasury Building. During the American Civil War, the Treasury Department sent him abroad to sell government bonds.

Following a Congressional investigation in 1868, Spencer M. Clark was forced to resign as Chief of the Bureau of Engraving and Printing and McCartee was named Acting Chief. He became Chief of the Bureau in 1869, holding this office until 1876.

McCartee then returned to Salem, New York, managing the Salem Press newspaper. He later secured an appointment as paymaster of the New York State Capitol.

McCartee died in Salem, New York in 1903 at age 70.

Government offices
Preceded by Spencer M. Clark	Chief of the Bureau of Engraving and Printing; 1869 – 1876	Succeeded by Henry C. Jewell
