= Rosa Vertner Jeffrey =

American poet and novelist (1828–1894)

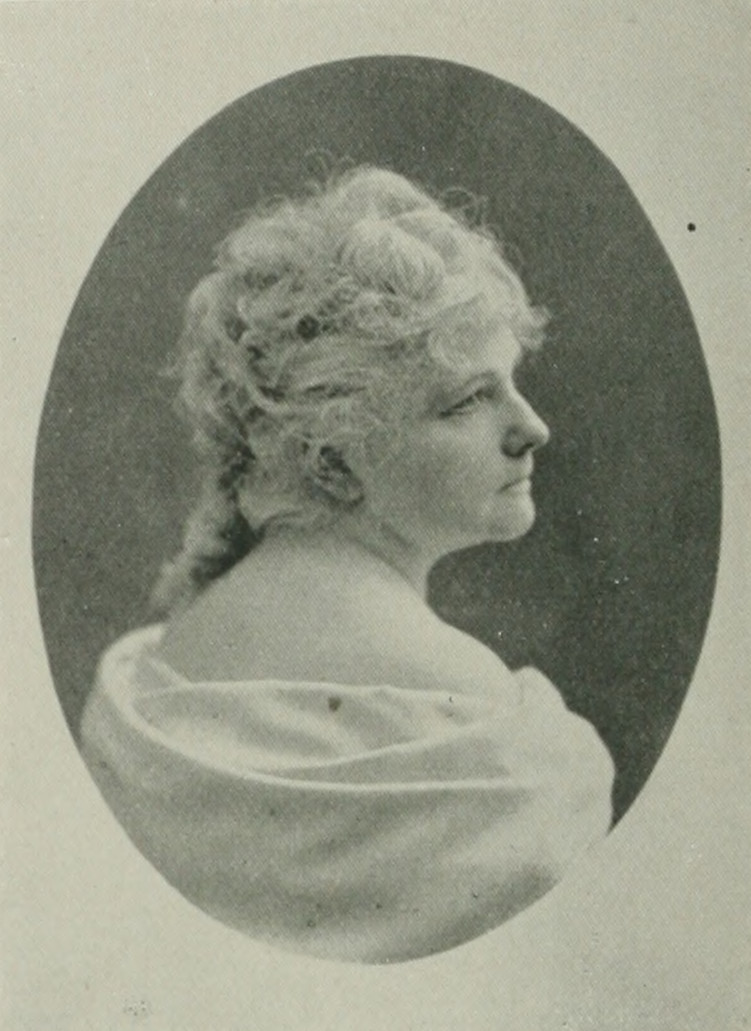
"A Woman of the Century"

Rosa Vertner Jeffrey (née, Griffith; after first marriage, Johnson; after second marriage, Jeffrey; 1828 – 1894) was an American poet and novelist from Lexington, Kentucky. She was the first southern woman whose literary work attracted attention throughout the US. Her books of poetry include Poems, by Rosa (1857); Daisy Dare and Baby Power (1871); and The Crimson Hand and Other Poems (1881). Her novels include Woodburn (1864) and Marsh (1884).

== Private life and education ==
Rosa Vertner Griffith was born in Natchez, Mississippi, in 1828. Her father, John Griffith (d. 1853), was a writer of prose and verse. Many of his Indian stories were published in the first-class Annuals, and several of them were complimented in England, including "The Fawn's Leap," and "Indian Bride". His brother, William T. Griffith, was an eminent lawyer in Mississippi. Rosa's grandfather, Rev. Dr. James Abercrombie of Philadelphia, was an Episcopal minister. Rosa's mother, who was a Miss Abercrombie, died when the child was nine months of age, leaving four young children; and it was then that Rosa's maternal aunt, Elizabeth Vertner, adopted her. Her early childhood was passed at a country home near Port Gibson, Mississippi, called "Burlington", and owned by her adopted father.

In 1838, her parents removed to Kentucky, settled in Lexington. She was educated at the seminary of Bishop Smith, at Lexington.

In 1845, Rosa was married at the age of 17 to Claude M. Johnson (d. 1861), a wealthy citizen of Lexington. She at once became a leader in society, not only in Lexington, but in Washington and other cities. In 1858, she was appointed by the Mount Vernon Ladies' Association as vice regent for Kentucky.

Rosa and Claude had six children, two of whom died young. Their son Claude later became mayor of Lexington. After her husband's death, Rosa and the four children removed to Rochester, New York, where she met and married Alexander Jeffrey of Edinburgh, Scotland. They had three children. After the American Civil War, she moved back to Lexington.

== Career ==
At the age of 15, she wrote her well-known poem, "Legend of the Opal". In 1850, under the signature of "Rosa," she became a contributor to the Louisville Journal, of which George D. Prentice was editor. A great number of her poems appeared in this journal, although, from time to time, she contributed to the principal literary journals of the US. In 1857, her poems were published in a volume by Ticknor & Fields, Boston. While living in Rochester, she published her first book, a novel, Woodburn, which was sent out from New York in 1864. She was the first southern woman whose literary work attracted attention throughout the US. Her volume of poems, Daisy Dare and Baby Power, was published in Philadelphia, in 1871. Her third volume of poetry, The Crimson Hand, and Other Poems, was published in 1881. Her novel, Marsh, was brought out in 1884. Among her literary productions are several dramas.

== Death ==
Rosa Vertner Jeffrey died in 1894 in Lexington.

== Selected works ==
=== Poetry books ===
- Poems, by Rosa (1857)
- Daisy Dare and Baby Power (1871)
- The Crimson Hand and Other Poems (1881)

=== Novels ===
- Woodburn (1864)
- Marsh (1884)
