= Alvin W. Hall =

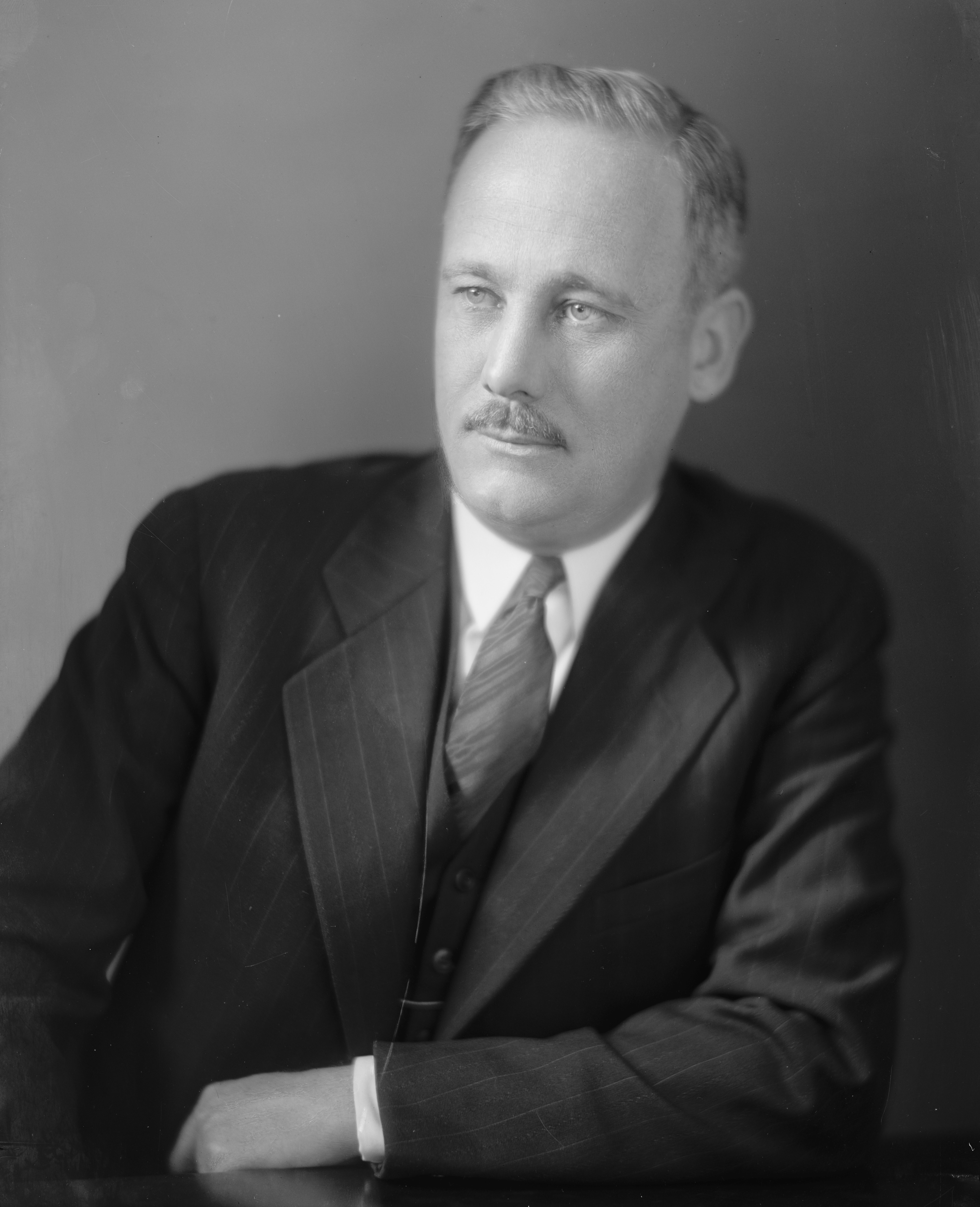
Alvin W. Hall

Alvin W. Hall (August 23, 1888 – February 15, 1969) was an official in the United States Department of the Treasury who was Director of the Bureau of Engraving and Printing from 1924 to 1954.

== Biography ==
Alvin W. Hall was born in Harleigh, Pennsylvania, in 1888 and grew up in Harleigh. He received an LL.B. from the National University School of Law.

Hall worked in the private sector as an accountant and auditor before entering government service. In 1920, he joined the United States Bureau of Efficiency and conducted efficiency studies for many government agencies.

In 1922, United States Secretary of the Treasury Andrew W. Mellon appointed Hall to a special committee designed to review the procedures of the Bureau of Engraving and Printing. After this committee reported, Hall became a member of the Bureau's planning unit. In 1924, he was appointed Director of the Bureau of Engraving and Printing. He was the youngest Director of the Bureau ever, and also the longest serving, holding office for thirty years until his retirement in 1954.

Hall died in Washington, D.C., in 1969 at age 80.

Government offices
Preceded by Wallace W. Kirby	Director of the Bureau of Engraving and Printing; 1924 – 1954	Succeeded by Henry J. Holtzclaw
