= James L. Wilmeth =

American treasury official

James L. Wilmeth

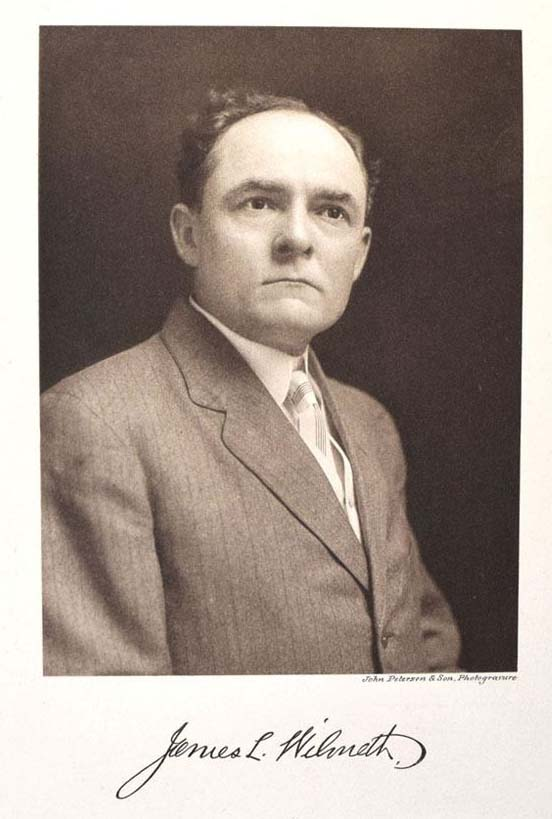
1917 image of Wilmeth from plate transferrer's union convention booklet

James L. Wilmeth (1870–1959) was an official in the United States Department of the Treasury who was Director of the Bureau of Engraving and Printing from 1917 to 1922.

== Biography ==
Wilmeth was born in Chewallah, Tennessee in 1870 and raised in Tennessee and Arkansas. He attended college in Arkansas and then spent several years working as a teacher.

In 1895, Wilmeth joined the United States Department of the Treasury in Washington, D.C. While working at the Treasury, he earned an LL.B. from the National University School of Law. After earning this degree, he worked as a law clerk in the Office of the Comptroller of the Treasury. He became Chief Clerk of the Treasury in 1910. He later worked for the Treasury in Europe as Custodian of Gold.

In 1917, Wilmeth became Director of the Bureau of Engraving and Printing. He was also mayor of Takoma Park, Maryland from 1920 to 1923. In 1922, in a surprise move, President of the United States Warren G. Harding issued an executive order dismissing Wilmeth and 28 other top officials in the Bureau of Engraving and Printing. They were suspected of improper duplication of bonds. Wilmeth was later completely exonerated of all charges, and in 1924, he was offered the opportunity to return to the post of Director of the Bureau of Engraving and Printing but Wilmeth refused.

After leaving government service, Wilmeth worked in an insurance firm.

Wilmeth retired to Philadelphia, where he died in 1959.

Government offices
Preceded by Joseph E. Ralph	Director of the Bureau of Engraving and Printing; 1917 – 1922	Succeeded by Louis A. Hill
