= Larry E. Rolufs =

American government official (born 1940)

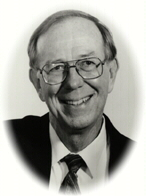
Larry E. Rolufs

Larry E. Rolufs (born 14 April 1940) was an official in the United States Department of the Treasury who was Director of the Bureau of Engraving and Printing from 1995 to 1997.

== Biography ==
Rolufs was born in Springfield, Missouri and raised in Placer County, California. He was educated at the California Polytechnic State University, receiving a bachelor's degree in printing engineering and management in 1962. He later received a master's degree in printing management from South Dakota State University.

In 1967, Rolufs joined the Internal Revenue Service. He later held printing management positions in the United States Geological Survey and the National Ocean Survey. He joined the Bureau of Engraving and Printing in 1979 as Assistant Director of Operations. In 1982, he became Deputy Director of the United States Mint. He later served as Deputy Treasurer of the United States. He became Chief of Printing of the US General Accounting Office in 1986. He later became Assistant Director of the GAO's Office of Information Management and Communications.

In 1996, Rolufs was named Director of the Bureau of Engraving and Printing. He held that office until he retired in 1998.

Government offices
Preceded by Peter H. Daly	Director of the Bureau of Engraving and Printing; 1996–1998	Succeeded by Thomas A. Ferguson
