= S. M. I. Henry =

American evangelist, reformer, and writer

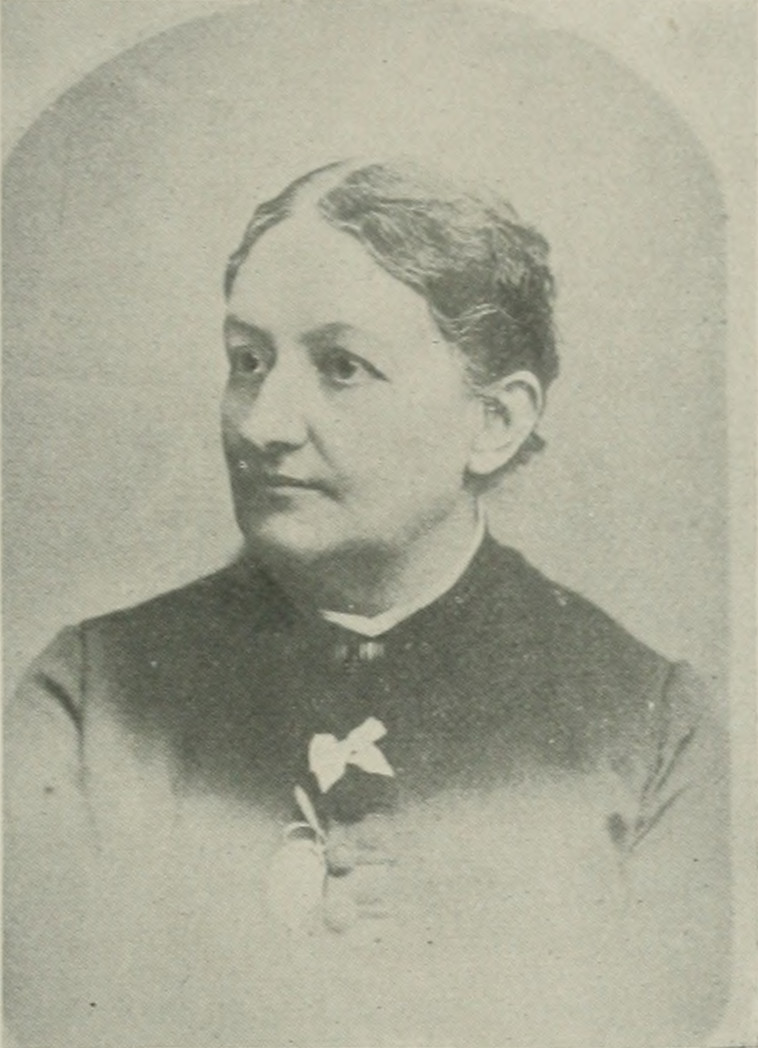
- Portrait photo from "A Woman of the Century"
- Born: Sarepta Myrenda Irish; November 4, 1839; Albion, Pennsylvania, U.S.
- Died: January 16, 1900 (aged 60); Graysville, Tennessee, U.S.
- Education: Rock River Seminary
- Occupations: evangelist; temperance reformer; poet; writer
- Spouse: James W. Henry (m. 1861; died 1871)
- Children: Mary, Alfred, Arthur
- Relatives: O. H. Irish (brother), Horatio Nelson Irish (father), Mary Allis Irish (née Clark) (mother)
- Writing career
- Pen name: Dina Linwood
- Notable works: Pledge and Cross

Sarepta Myrenda Irish Henry (November 4, 1839 – January 16, 1900) was an American evangelist, temperance reformer, poet and author. She also wrote under the pen name Dina Linwood.

Henry was among the first to join the Women's Crusade. From the beginning of the organization of the Woman's Christian Temperance Union (WCTU), she was associated with the national body as superintendent of evangelical work and as evangelist. For seven years, she was associated with gospel temperance in Rockford, Illinois. In 1888, she served as the chairperson of the National WCTU's Evangelistic Bureau. A partial record of this work is found in her book Pledge and Cross. Henry occupied pulpits among all denominations throughout the United States. Through her evangelistic work, saloons were closed, churches built and hundreds converted. Her published fourteen books of which two, Victoria and Marble Cross, were poetry collections. The prose works were After the Truth, in four volumes, Pledge and Cross, Voice of the Home and its Legend, Mabel's Work, One More Chance, Beforehand, Afterward, Unanswered Prayer, and Frances Raymond's Investment.

== Early life and education ==
Sarepta Myrenda Irish was born in Albion, Pennsylvania, November 4, 1839. She was of New England ancestry.

Her father, Rev. Horatio Nelson Irish, was an architect before he became a Methodist clergyman. He was preaching in Albion at the time of the daughter's birth. In 1841, he was sent to Illinois as a missionary, where he did pioneer work. Her mother was Mary Allis Clark Irish. Her great-grandfather, on the mother's side, was a surgeon in the American Revolutionary War; her grandfather, a captain of militia in the war of 1812. Her father's family were Quakers.

She learned to read from her Bible that her grandmother gave her when a very little child. Her father taught her himself until she was nineteen. She had hardly ever attended school until, in 1859, Henry entered the Rock River Seminary, in Mount Morris, Illinois, under the reign of President Harlow, when she had for her pastor Rev. John H. Vincent, then just coming into his life work. Recognition had been given to her literary ability, and during her school days, she won many honors in composition. Very early in life, she showed considerable power in composing; in fact, her mind was expressing her thoughts in verse before she had a knowledge of meter and rhyme. The first production of her pen to appear in print was a poem published during the year 1855, in the Northwestern Christian Advocate. From that time on, she became a steady contributor to various religious magazines, writing more often, however, for The Ladies' Repository, assuming the name of "Dina Linwood", until sometime in the year 1859, when she yielded to her father's suggestion to drop the pen name. During the first term at school, she was called home to see her father die. He had been an invalid for eight years, and she was his constant companion, reading and writing for him. She even used to do her thinking aloud to him.

Henry was fond of literary pursuits from childhood, and her mother humored all her poetic fancies with no responsibility. Her school life was spent at Mount Morris, Illinois, where began an acquaintance with many choice men and women who helped her future. Rev. Dr. John H. Vincent was her pastor and friend, and with his wife took her under their care, and made it possible for her to rally and go on after her bereavement. Her boarding-place was in the home of Rev. B. H. Cartwright. A portion of every day was spent with him and his wife in their study, and a tie was formed then that has but strengthened in future years.

== Career ==
=== Civil War years ===
Henry had many convictions that she ought to enter the foreign missionary field.

She married James W. Henry of East Homer, New York, March 1, 1861. Her husband was a scholar and poet, as well as a teacher by profession. They lived briefly in northwestern Iowa. Both James and S.M.I. Henry had abolitionist sympathies. James enlisted to the Union Army at the start of the American Civil War, in 1864. He was not, however, mustered in at first, because he was a bit under regulation height, so husband and wife went East, to his home, and settled down on a farm. Here was born, in June, their daughter Mary. It was during the first year of Mary's life, that Henry's first book, Victoria, was written. That poem was not published until Mr. Henry was a soldier. He enlisted again in October, 1864, in the 185th New York Volunteer Infantry, Company E. Her oldest son, Alfred, was born April 4, 1865. The husband came home an invalid in July, 1865, having been in every battle and on every long march of the closing campaign conducted by the 5th Corps. He lived over four years, bravely battling disease, but died in 1871, and was laid to rest in the cemetery of his native valley. Arthur, the youngest son, was nearly three years old when his father died.

Henry taught for the next three years; for the first two and a half in the village where she had lived, but later on returned to her Illinois home. She began teaching in Rockford, Illinois, under Professor Barbour, in the public school, and was trying to get her children settled in a home where she could have them with her, when good fortune came her way. As a result, she moved into the home she sought where she began writing the "After Truth" series, for which she was paid a fair price.

=== Temperance ===
She became involved with the Women's Crusade in 1873–74. Being a timid woman, no one expected her to do anything in public, but under the pressure of her convictions, she made the call for Christian women to come together, and became the mouthpiece of the Woman's Christian Temperance Union (WCTU) on March 27, 1873. She made her first public address in the State Street Baptist Church, Rockford, during the Crusade, to an audience that overflowed into the street. She was very conservative and always looked to the time when she would return to literary work; but as the years passed, it becomes more and more evident that it was a lifework to which she was then called.

A Reform Club was organized the year after she began her work. Pledge and Cross told the story of its redemption. She gave five full years to active temperance work in Rockford, one year of Gospel work in Michigan, and three years in the field in Illinois. In July 1879, Henry removed to Evanston, Illinois, to educate her children at Northwestern University.

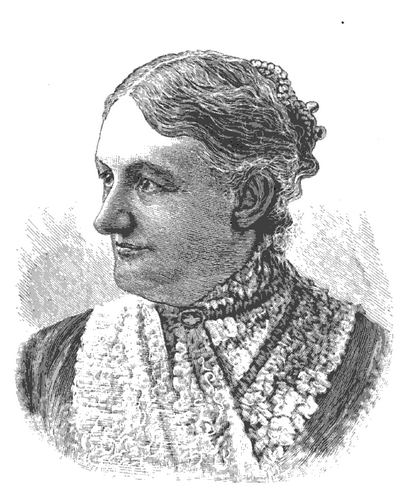
Sarepta Myrenda Irish Henry (1888)

Henry was one of the WCTU's speakers at the Illinois State Capitol when they presented the "Home Protection Petition." She made the plea from the point of view of a widow with fatherless children, and asked the same power to protect them from the dram shops which their father would have possessed had he not died. Her lecture on "What is the Boy Worth?" was a presentation of the question of the hour, and was given with telling effect in scores of towns and cities.

The book, Roy, or The Voice of his Home, was one of Henry's best. Its sequel was, Mabel's Work. Pledge and Cross had the largest sale of any book of its kind, and conveyed the essence of the Gospel Temperance Crusade. All were published by John Newton Stearns, New York.

The Temperance Training Institute was founded by Henry, by which normal Sunday School methods were applied to the understanding of temperance work, the spiritual side being strongly emphasized. Dr. Vincent invited Henry to prepare a series of Biblical Temperance Lessons for the Sunday-School Teacher. Henry was also superintendent of the WCTU's National Training School for Temperance Workers.

== Later life and death ==
In later life, while staying at Battle Creek Sanitarium, she became a Seventh-day Adventist. She spent part of her time in mission work in the slums of Chicago, in connection with the old Bethsaida Mission. Henry succumbed to pneumonia on January 16, 1900, in Graysville, Tennessee.

== Selected works ==
=== Books ===
- Victoria: With Other Poems Poe & Hitchcock: Cincinnati, 1865.
- The Abiding Spirit (1899)
- Studies in Home and Child Life (1898)
- Good Form and Christian Etiquette (1900)
- The Marble Cross and Other Poems
- The Unanswered Prayer

=== Articles ===
- "Saved by Families" DjVu by Henry. The Advent Review and Sabbath Herald 77:5 (30 January 1900)". "Saved by Families" DjVu by Henry, reprint. The Advent Review and Sabbath Herald 95:2 (10 January 1918), p15
- "My Telescope" DjVu by Henry. Ministry v54 (June 1981), p12–14
- "Woman's Work" by Henry. Adventists Affirm 21 (Spring 2007), p34–43

=== Songs ===
- I Know My Heavenly Father Knows
