= Leonard R. Olijar =

American government official

Leonard Olijar
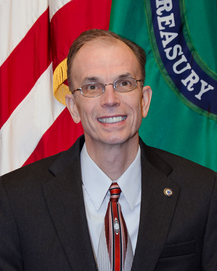
- Olijar in 2015

Director of the Bureau of Engraving and Printing
- In office May 2015 – 2023
- President: Barack Obama; Donald Trump; Joe Biden
- Preceded by: Larry R. Felix
- Succeeded by: Patricia S. Collins

Personal details
- Born: Leonard Richard Olijar; September 1959 (age 67) Lower Burrell, Pennsylvania, U.S.
- Education: Pennsylvania State University (BS); University of Colorado Denver (MS)

Leonard Richard Olijar is an American government official who had served as the director of the Bureau of Engraving and Printing from 2015 to 2023. As director, Olijar was responsible for managing the Bureau of Engraving and Printing, an agency within the United States Department of the Treasury tasked with producing Federal Reserve Notes, paper currencies, and United States Treasury securities.

== Early life and education ==
Born in September 1959, Olijar grew up in Lower Burrell, Pennsylvania. After graduating from Burrell High School, he earned a Bachelor of Science in Forestry from Pennsylvania State University in 1980, followed by a master's degree in accounting from the University of Colorado Denver in 1987.

== Career ==
Olijar began his career at the Bureau of Engraving and Printing in 1989 as a systems accountant. In 2006, he became chief financial officer of the Bureau of Engraving and Printing. In January 2013, Olijar became the Deputy Director of the Bureau of Engraving and Printing. Olijar was nominated to serve as Director by Barack Obama in 2015. As Director of the Bureau of Engraving and Printing, Olijar is responsible for the redesign of the $10, $20 and $50 bills, a process former U.S. Treasury Secretary Jack Lew described as "painfully slow", particularly as it relates to the replacement of Andrew Jackson by Harriet Tubman on the $20 bill, announced by Lew in 2016. Olijar retired in 2023.

== Personal life ==
Olijar resides in Centreville, Virginia, with his wife, Suzanne. They have two daughters.
