= Truman N. Burrill =

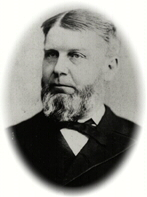
Truman N. Burrill

Truman N. Burrill (1832–1896) was an official in the United States Department of the Treasury who was Chief of the Bureau of Engraving and Printing from 1883 to 1885.

== Biography ==
Truman N. Burrill was born in Elbridge, New York in 1832. In the 1850s, he and his brother opened a dry goods and clothing store in Penn Yan, New York.

During the American Civil War, Burrill formed and headed an infantry company in 1862. He was discharged from the Union Army in 1863 because of a physical disability. In 1864, he returned to the Army with the rank of Captain and served as a commissary on the staffs of several commanding officers.

After the war, Burrill worked in furniture making in Rochester, New York and Buffalo, New York.

Burrill joined the Bureau of Engraving and Printing in 1880 as a storekeeper. He later became the clerk in charge of proposals and supplies. With the sudden death of O. H. Irish in 1883, Burrill was appointed Chief of the Bureau of Engraving and Printing. He held this office until 1885.

Burrill died in New York City in 1896.

Government offices
| Preceded by O. H. Irish | Chief of the Bureau of Engraving and Printing; 1883 – 1885 | Succeeded by Edward O. Graves |
