= Francis Speight (artist) =

Francis Wayland Speight (1896–1989) was a notable Regionalist painter renowned for his realist depictions of the Pennsylvania landscape, especially the industrial scenes and neighborhoods of the Manayunk section of Philadelphia.

== Life ==
Born on his family farm in rural North Carolina, he attended Wake Forest College, eventually moving on to studies at the Corcoran School of Art in Washington, DC at the encouragement of his older sister Margaret. He then moved to Philadelphia to study at the Pennsylvania Academy of the Fine Arts (PAFA), where he later became a respected teacher and influential mentor.

Speight joined the faculty at The Pennsylvania Academy in the 1920s and taught there for several decades, shaping generations of American artists. He was associated with the American Scene movement and Regionalism and is best known for his expressive use of light and bold brushwork in depicting everyday scenes with emotional depth and technical skill. He excelled at painting cityscapes, especially of Manayunk neighborhood, perched high above the Schuylkill River. At PAFA, we was awarded the Cresson Travel Scholarship in 1923 and 1925. He was elected a member of the National Academy of Design in New York in 1940, the same year that he also won the Jennie Sesnan Gold Medal of Honor at the Pennsylvania Academy of the Fine Arts. Other accolades include the Gold Medal award for Landscape at PAFA in 1926 and the Kohnstamm Prize at the Art Institute of Chicago in 1930.

In 1961, he returned to North Carolina to teach at East Carolina University, where he continued painting and mentoring students until his retirement. He was the subject of a retrospective exhibit at the North Carolina Museum of Art in 1961. Throughout his life, Speight received numerous awards and honors for his contributions to American art. His works are held in major collections, including the Metropolitan Museum of Art, Museum of Fine Arts, Boston, the Philadelphia Museum of Art, the North Carolina Museum of Art, the Pennsylvania Academy of the Fine Arts, and the Woodmere Art Museum, among others.

== Personal life ==
He married Sarah Blakeslee, a former student and fellow artist, in 1936.

== Work ==
His painting White House with Variation, oil on canvas, 1930 brought a record price for the artist at auction, achieving $126,000.
