= Claude M. Johnson =

American politician

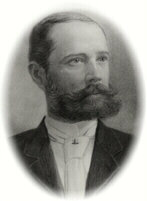
Claude M. Johnson

Claude M. Johnson Jr. (December 1, 1852 – March 21, 1919) was an American printer who was Director of the Bureau of Engraving and Printing from 1893 to 1900, and a six-term mayor of Lexington, Kentucky.

== Biography ==
Claude M. Johnson Jr. was born in Lexington, Kentucky in 1852, to Claude M. Johnson, a plantation owner, and Rosa Vertner Johnson, a poet. He attended school in Lexington and Rochester, New York.

After school, Johnson returned to Lexington and worked in the grocery and drug business. He was elected to the Lexington city council and then went on to serve as mayor of Lexington from 1880 to 1888.

Johnson had a long-standing relationship with fellow Kentuckian John G. Carlisle. When Carlisle became United States Secretary of the Treasury in 1893, he appointed Johnson Director of the Bureau of Engraving and Printing. He held this office until 1900.

After leaving government service, Johnson worked as an Indian agent in Arizona. He then moved to London and headed a printing company there.

Johnson died in Lexington in 1919 at age 66.

Government offices
Preceded by William Morton Meredith	Director of the Bureau of Engraving and Printing; 1893 – 1900	Succeeded by William Morton Meredith
