= Vermin Club =

British Conservative Party grassroots organisation of the 1940s

A badge from the Vermin Club (St Albans Museums).

The Vermin Club was an organisation of grassroots Conservative Party supporters in Britain in the late 1940s.

On the evening of 4 July 1948, Aneurin Bevan, the Labour Government's Minister of Health, addressed the annual Labour rally for the North of England at Belle Vue, Manchester, and described Conservatives as "lower than vermin". Young Tories, disregarding the "lower than" part, took on the description with ironic self-deprecation and set up the Vermin Club.

Members took to wearing vermin badges (a chrome badge featuring a rat and the word VERMIN). A whole hierarchy was established, so that those who recruited ten new party members wore badges identifying them as vile vermin; those who recruited twenty five were very vile vermin. Margaret Thatcher was an early member of the group and rose through the ranks to become a "Chief Rat". The club boasted a membership of between 105,000 and 120,000 at its height.

== See also ==
- Basket of deplorables, a similar disparagement that galvanised the political opposition
- Cockroach Janta Party, a satirical Indian political party founded in response to comments by Surya Kant
