= Director of the Bureau of Engraving and Printing =

US Treasury official

Seal of the Bureau of Engraving and Printing.

The director of the Bureau of Engraving and Printing is the head of the Bureau of Engraving and Printing within the United States Department of the Treasury. The current acting director is Michael Brown

The position has existed since 1862, when the United States Congress authorized the Treasury Department to begin printing paper money. Until the 1890s, the office was commonly known as Chief of the Bureau of Engraving and Printing.

The director operates with general directions provided by the United States secretary of the treasury.

== List of directors of the Bureau of Engraving and Printing ==
The following persons served as the director of the Bureau of Engraving and Printing:

No.	Image	Name	Assumed office	Left office	Refs.	President appointed by
1		Spencer M. Clark	1862	1868		Abraham Lincoln
2		George B. McCartee	1869	1876		Ulysses S. Grant
3		Henry C. Jewell	1876	1877		Ulysses S. Grant
4		Edward McPherson	1877	1878		Rutherford B. Hayes
5		O. H. Irish	1878	1883 (Note: Died in office.)		Rutherford B. Hayes
6		Truman N. Burrill	1883	1885		Chester A. Arthur
7		Edward O. Graves	1885	1889		Grover Cleveland
8		William Morton Meredith	1889	1893		Benjamin Harrison
9		Claude M. Johnson	1893	1900		Grover Cleveland
10		William Morton Meredith	1900	1906		William McKinley
11		Thomas J. Sullivan	1906	1908		Theodore Roosevelt
12		Joseph E. Ralph	1908	1917		Theodore Roosevelt
13		James L. Wilmeth	1917	1922		Woodrow Wilson
14		Louis A. Hill	1922	1924		Warren G. Harding
15		Wallace W. Kirby	1924	1924		Calvin Coolidge
16		Alvin W. Hall	1924	1954		Calvin Coolidge
17		Henry J. Holtzclaw	1954	1967		Dwight D. Eisenhower
18		James A. Conlon	1967	1977		Lyndon B. Johnson
19		Seymour Berry	1977	1979		Jimmy Carter
20		Harry R. Clements	1979	1982		Jimmy Carter
21		Robert J. Leuver	1983	1988		Ronald Reagan
22		Peter H. Daly	1988	1995		Ronald Reagan
23		Larry E. Rolufs	1996	1998		Bill Clinton
Acting		Thomas A. Ferguson	January 1998	December 7, 1998		Bill Clinton
24		Thomas A. Ferguson	December 7, 1998	2006		Bill Clinton
25		Larry R. Felix	January 11, 2006	January 31, 2015		George W. Bush
Acting		Leonard R. Olijar	February 1, 2015	May 2015		Barack Obama
26		Leonard R. Olijar	May 2015	June 30, 2023		Barack Obama
Acting		Charlene E. Williams	July 1, 2023	March 23, 2024		
27		Patricia Solimene	March 24, 2024	April 27, 2026		Joe Biden
Acting		Michael Brown	April 27, 2026	Incumbent		

Table notes:
