= Edward McPherson =

American politician (1830–1895)

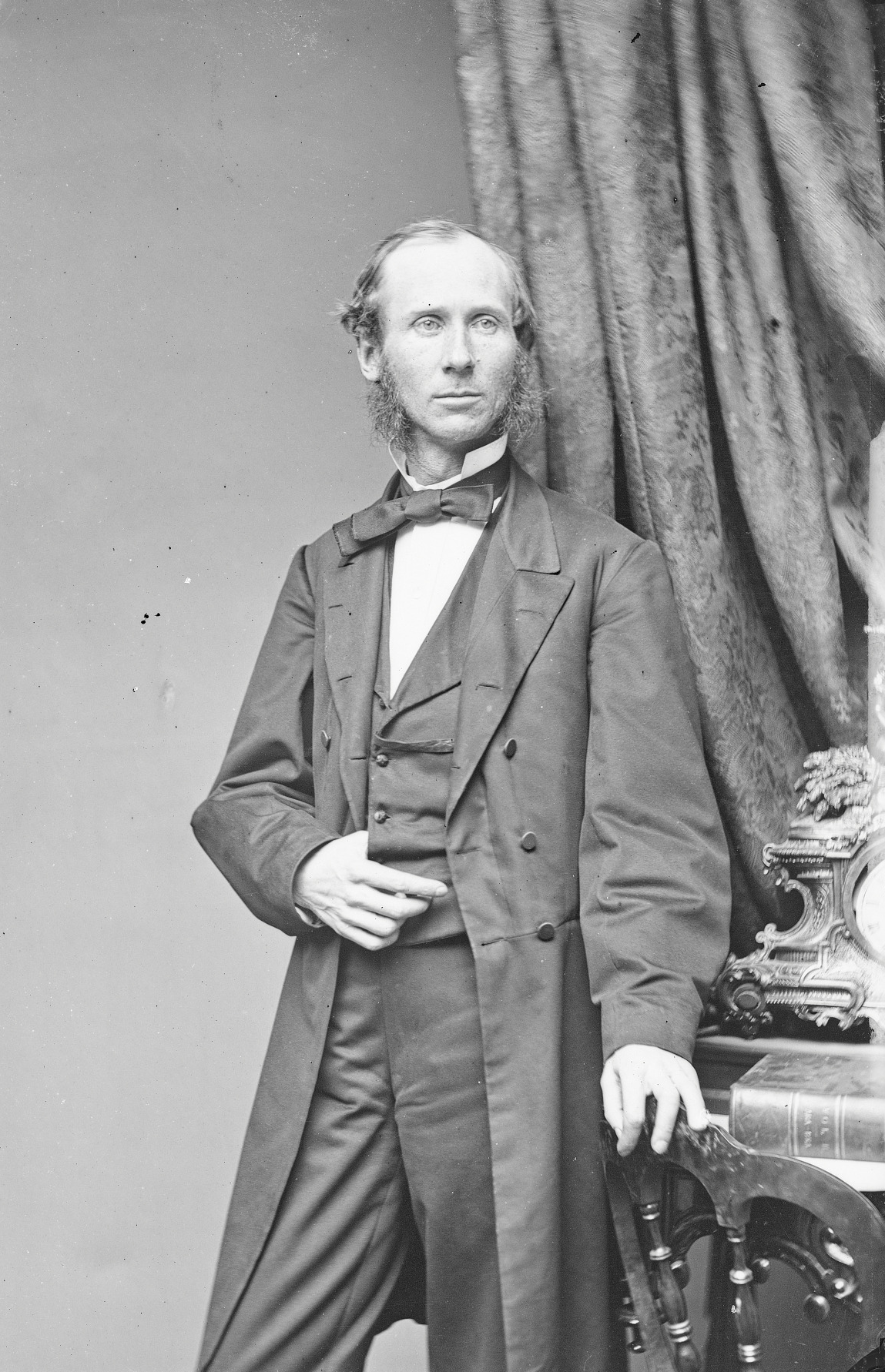
- McPherson, 1860–1870

Clerk of the United States House of Representatives
- In office: 1889–1891; 1881–1883; 1863–1875

Director of the Bureau of Engraving and Printing
- In office 1877–1878
- Preceded by: Henry C. Jewell
- Succeeded by: O. H. Irish

Member of the U.S. House of Representatives from Pennsylvania's 17th district
- In office March 4, 1859 – March 3, 1863
- Preceded by: Wilson Reilly
- Succeeded by: Archibald McAllister

Personal details
- Born: July 31, 1830 Gettysburg, Pennsylvania, U.S.
- Died: December 14, 1895 (aged 65) Gettysburg, Pennsylvania, U.S.
- Party: Whig (before 1855); American (1855–58); Republican (after 1858)
- Education: Pennsylvania College

Edward McPherson (July 31, 1830 – December 14, 1895) was an American newspaper editor and politician who served two terms in the United States House of Representatives, as well as three terms as the Clerk of the House of Representatives. As a director of the Gettysburg Battlefield Memorial Association, he effected efforts to protect and mark portions of the Gettysburg Battlefield.

== Early life and career ==
Edward McPherson was born in Gettysburg, Pennsylvania on July 31, 1830. He studied law and botany at Pennsylvania College, graduating in 1848 as valedictorian.

== Career ==
In Thaddeus Stevens' firm in Lancaster, McPherson became a Whig. McPherson left the law practice due to illness and moved to Harrisburg, editing the Harrisburg American in 1851, and the Lancaster Independent Whig (1851–1854). In 1855, he started and edited an American Party paper, the Pittsburgh Evening Times. He moved back to Gettysburg the next year and resumed his legal career. He inherited his father's farm west of town along the Chambersburg Turnpike in 1858 and was elected to the 36th and 37th United States Congresses (1859 – March 1863, Republican). He was a member of the Republican National Committee in 1860.

During his tenure in the U.S. House of Representatives he served on the Committee on Military Affairs and Joint Committee on the Library.

=== Civil War ===
McPherson organized Company K of the First Pennsylvania Reserves at the beginning of the American Civil War, and was defeated in the 1862 reelection when his House of Representatives district (Adams, Franklin, Fulton, Bedford, and Juniata counties) was expanded to include opposing Radical Republicans in Somerset County (substituted for Juniata). President Abraham Lincoln appointed McPherson as Deputy Commissioner of Revenue in 1863. After the Battle of Gettysburg, McPherson became an officer of the Gettysburg Battlefield Memorial Association with an office on the corner of Baltimore and Middle streets, and after Congressman Morehead nominated him, Thaddeus Stevens had him appointed as Clerk of the House of Representatives (December 8, 1863 – December 5, 1875).

=== Postwar career ===
McPherson presided over the Republican National Convention in 1876, and President Hayes appointed him as director of the United States Bureau of Engraving and Printing (1877–1878). Returning to the newspaper business, he was editor of the Philadelphia Press from 1877 until 1880. He also served as editor of the New York Tribune Almanac from 1877 to 1895 and was editor and proprietor of a newspaper in Gettysburg from 1880 until 1895. He was the American editor of the Almanach de Gotha. He again served as Clerk of the House of Representatives from December 1881 to December 1883 and for a third time from December 1889 to December 1891. McPherson was the attorney for the 1893 complaint against the Gettysburg Electric Railway which ended in the Supreme Court case of United States v. Gettysburg Electric Railway Co.

McPherson diverted printing contracts away from Radical Republican newspapers and to moderate newspapers instead. He diverted the contracts from the Jacksonville Florida Times to Florida Union in Florida, Albion W. Tourgée's Union Register to William Woods Holden's Raleigh Daily Standard in North Carolina, and gave contracts to two newspapers edited by former Confederate officers. He initially granted a contract to The New Orleans Tribune, a black-owned newspaper supported by Radicals, but revoked it in 1868 at the request of Thomas W. Conway.

== Personal life ==
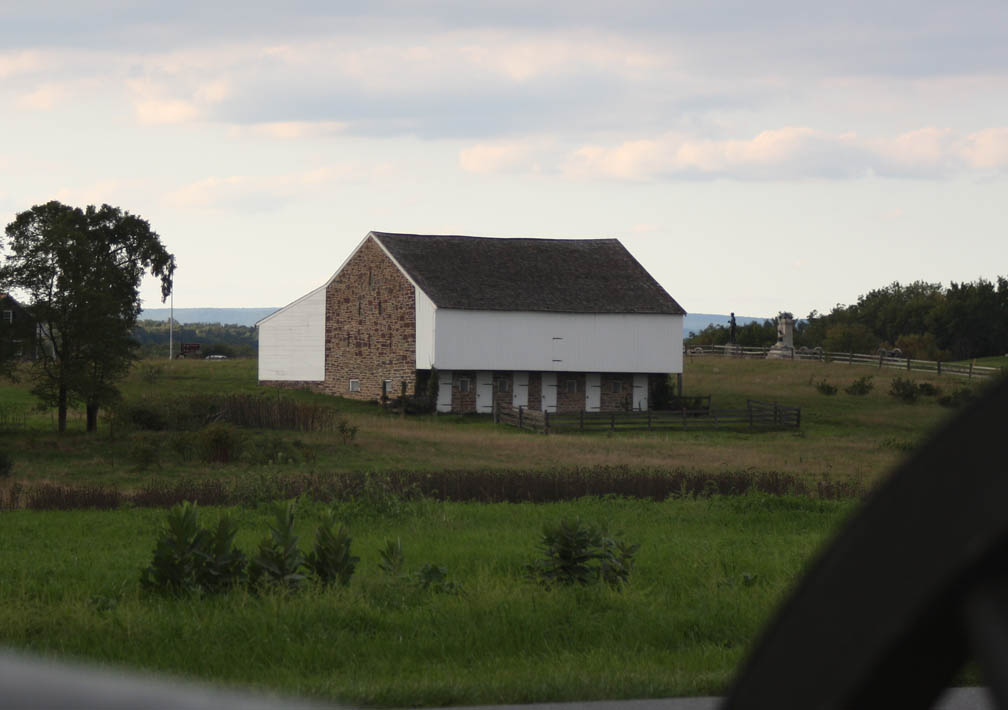
1863 Battle of Gettysburg combat on July 1 was at the barn on McPherson Ridge, which had been named for McPherson by 1892.

McPherson married Annie D. Crawford in 1862, and they had four sons and a daughter.

He died of accidental poisoning in Gettysburg on December 14, 1895. He was interred at Evergreen Cemetery in Adams County, Pennsylvania.

The Edward McPherson Society is named in his honor.

== Works ==
In 1941, the papers of Edward McPherson were added to the Library of Congress, and his published works include:

- McPherson, Edward (1864). Political History of the United States of America During the Great Rebellion (2nd ed.). Philp & Solomons.
- —— (1871). The Political History of the United States of America During the Period of Reconstruction.
- —— (September 12, 1889). "Remarks of Hon. Edward McPherson". The Star and Sentinel.

== Works cited ==
- Abbott, Richard (1986). The Republican Party and the South, 1855–1877: The First Southern Strategy. University of North Carolina Press. ISBN 0-8078-1680-9.
- Martin, David G. (2003). Gettysburg July 1. Combined Publishing. p. 584. ISBN 0-938289-81-0.
- Standing Committees of the House of Representatives of the United States, Thirty-Seventh Congress, Third Session, Commencing Monday, December 1, 1862. United States Government Publishing Office. 1863. LCCN 2022691784.

U.S. House of Representatives
Preceded by Wilson Reilly	Member of the U.S. House of Representatives from Pennsylvania's 17th congressional district 1859–1863	Succeeded by Archibald McAllister
Government offices
Preceded by Emerson Etheridge	Clerk of the United States House of Representatives; 1863–1875	Succeeded by George M. Adams
Preceded by Henry C. Jewell	Chief of the Bureau of Engraving and Printing; 1877–1878	Succeeded by O. H. Irish
Preceded by George M. Adams	Clerk of the United States House of Representatives; 1881–1883	Succeeded by John B. Clark, Jr.
Preceded by John B. Clark, Jr.	Clerk of the United States House of Representatives; 1889–1891	Succeeded by James Kerr
