= Spencer M. Clark =

American government official

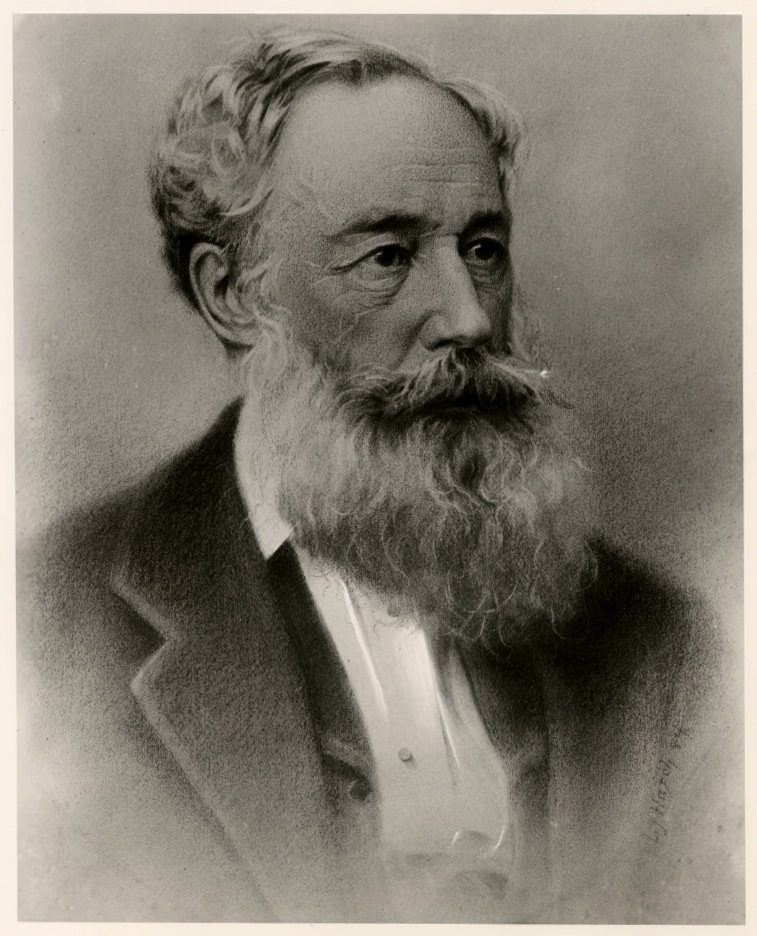
- Born: June 3, 1811; Vermont, US
- Died: December 10, 1890 (aged 79)
- Known for: First Superintendent of the US National Currency Bureau

Spencer M. Clark (June 3, 1811 – December 10, 1890) was the first Superintendent of the National Currency Bureau, today known as the Bureau of Engraving and Printing, from 1862 to 1868.

== Public service ==
Spencer Morton Clark was born in Vermont and was involved in a variety of business activities until 1856 when he became a clerk in the Bureau of Construction of the Treasury Department in Washington, D.C. According to a history of the Bureau of Engraving and Printing, Clark became interested in the work of finishing new currency notes at the Treasury and gradually assumed increasingly greater responsibilities in the engraving, printing, and processing of U.S. Government currency and securities. He was a strong advocate for a distinct bureau within the Treasury Department for the production of currency and securities and took over as the first Superintendent of the National Currency Bureau in 1862.

== Bureau of Engraving and Printing ==
On August 29, 1862, Clark commenced work with one male assistant and four female operatives, according to a 1977 Washington Post article. Clark is said to have developed the original "Treasury Seal," a variation of which still appears on U.S. notes, according to a 1979 Washington Post article. Clark is also credited with proposing that facsimile signatures for the Treasurer of the United States and the Register of the Treasury be imprinted on U.S. notes using a "peculiar process and with peculiar ink." Prior to that, the signatures were penned by an army of clerks "For the" appropriate official, the Post article added.

== Fractional faux pas ==
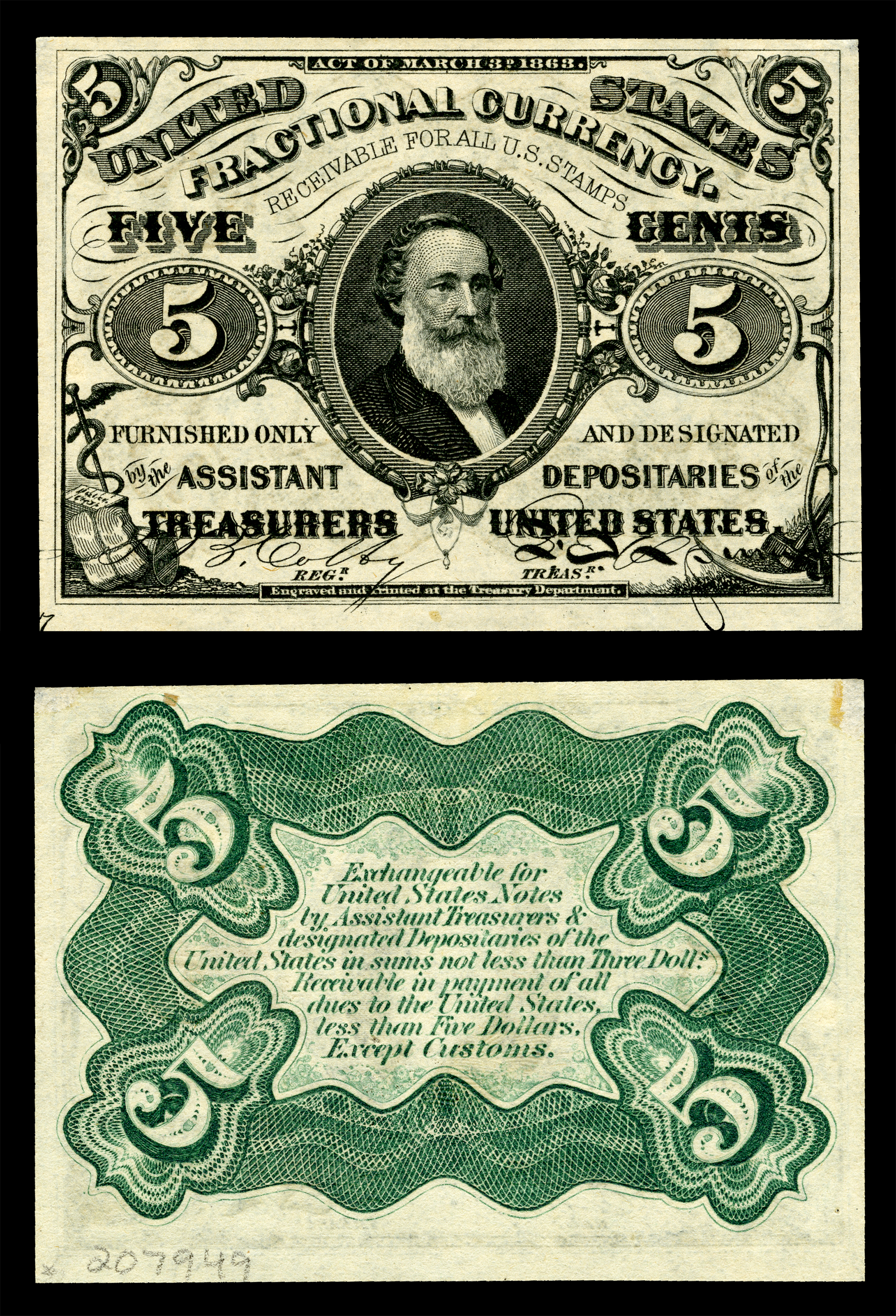
Clark depicted on fractional currency.

In 1864, Congress authorized the issuance of a series of fractional currency notes in denominations of 3, 5, 10, 15, 25 and 50 cents, with Clark’s office being given responsibility for production of the notes.

A controversy ensued when it was discovered that Clark's image had been put on the 5-cent note. There are different historical accounts of how this occurred.

In one, the 5-cent note was supposed to bear a portrait of "Clark," as in explorer William Clark of Lewis and Clark fame. But because no one had distinctly specified exactly which Clark, the currency superintendent took it upon himself to put his own portrait on the bills.

In another version, Clark ordered that the portrait of Francis E. Spinner, treasurer of the United States, be placed on the 50-cent note without consulting him. Spinner was pleased with it, and as he had authority to select portraits on new notes, approved it. Other designs were selected at random and when it came to issuing the 5-cent note, Spinner was asked whose portrait was to be selected. Clark is said to have replied, "How would the likeness of Clark do?" "Excellent," said Spinner, thinking that reference was made to Freeman Clarke, the Comptroller of the Currency. The matter escaped further notice until the notes had been printed in enormous quantities.

Whatever the story, Congress was outraged when the notes, which had already been mass-produced, came out. According to numismatic historian Walter Breen, Congress’s "immediate infuriated response was to pass a law retiring the 5¢ denomination, and another to forbid portrayal of any living person on federal coins or currency."

Clark only kept his job because of the personal intervention of Treasury Secretary Salmon P. Chase.

== Departure ==
Clark resigned from the National Currency Bureau in 1868 amidst a congressional investigation into record-keeping and security within the agency. He went on to work at the Department of Agriculture in the Statistical Division. He later headed the Bureau of Vital Statistics in the Agriculture Department until his death in 1890.

Government offices
Preceded by New Office	Chief of the Bureau of Engraving and Printing; 1862–1868	Succeeded by George B. McCartee
