= Diane Hessan =

Diane Hessan is an American author and Vice Chair of the Trustee Advisory Board of Beth Israel Deaconess Medical Center.

== Career ==
Hessan began her career at General Foods, in product management, and then worked in consulting at Resource Planning Associates. In 1980, she joined The Forum Corporation, where she become Executive Vice.

In 2000, she joined Communispace. Hessan has received awards and accolades including Ernst & Young's Entrepreneur of the Year, The Northstar Award from Springboard, the Most Admired CEO Award from the Boston Business Journal, the Pinnacle Award for Achievement in Entrepreneurship from the Greater Boston Chamber of Commerce, and the Believe in Girls Award from Big Sister of Massachusetts.

In 2014, she was inducted into the Babson College Academy of Distinguished Entrepreneurs and received Brandeis University’s Asper Award for Global Entrepreneurship. Hessan has honorary degrees from Bentley University and the New England College of Business.

== Publications ==
- Our Common Ground: Insights from Four Years of Listening to American Voters.
- Customer-Centered Growth: 5 Strategies for Building Competitive Advantage (1995), with Richard Whiteley.
