= Wallace W. Kirby =

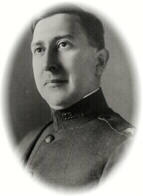
Wallace W. Kirby

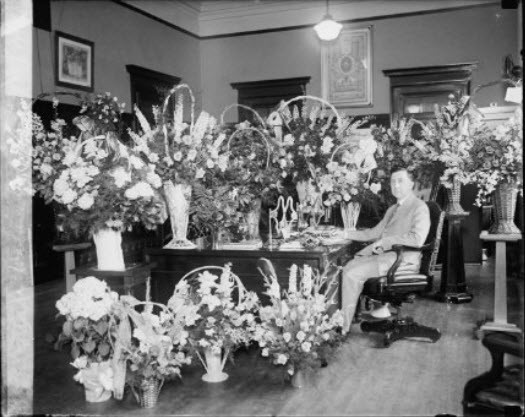
Kirby during his time as Director of the Bureau of Engraving and Printing, June 16, 1924.

Wallace W. Kirby (1881–1962) was an officer of the United States Army who served as Director of the Bureau of Engraving and Printing in 1924.

== Biography ==
Wallace W. Kirby was born in 1881 and raised in Washington, D.C. After school, he went into the printing business. In 1900, he joined the United States Geological Survey.

During World War I, Kirby was commissioned as an officer in the United States Army and assigned to the United States Army Corps of Engineers, where he was responsible for map reproduction activities. While serving with expeditionary forces in France, Kirby commanded the 29th Engineers, a unit of surveying and map-making experts.

In February 1924, President of the United States Calvin Coolidge named Kirby Director of the Bureau of Engraving and Printing. Because Kirby was a member of the military, he was not eligible to hold this office, so the United States Congress passed a joint resolution to allow Kirby to hold this office for six months without resigning his military commission.

After his time as Director of the Bureau of Engraving and Printing, Kirby returned to the Engineer Reproduction Plant in Washington, D.C.

Kirby left the Army in 1927, forming a printing company in Arlington, Virginia that he ran until his death in 1962.

Government offices
Preceded by Louis A. Hill	Director of the Bureau of Engraving and Printing; 1924	Succeeded by Alvin W. Hall
