= Larry R. Felix =

American government official (born 1958)

Larry Felix
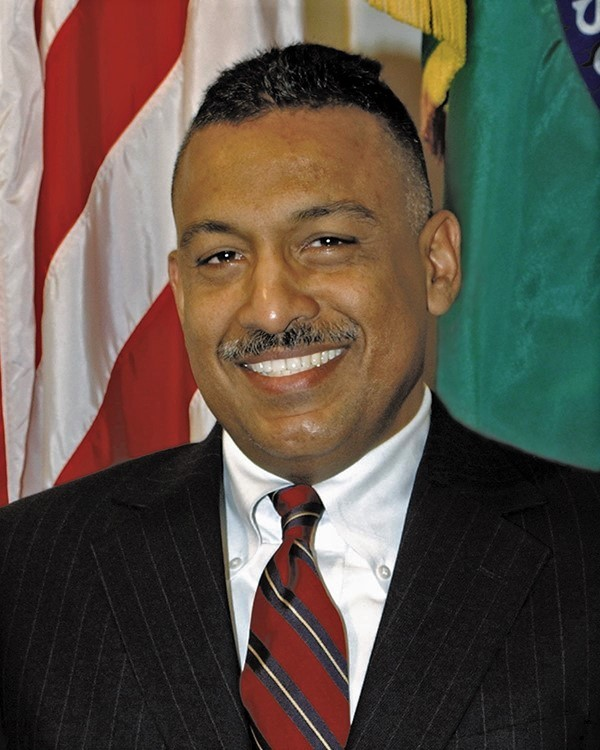
- Felix in 2006

Director of the Bureau of Engraving and Printing
- In office January 2006 – January 2015
- President: George W. Bush; Barack Obama
- Preceded by: Thomas A. Ferguson
- Succeeded by: Leonard R. Olijar

Personal details
- Born: 1958 (age 67–68) Port of Spain, Trinidad and Tobago
- Education: New York City College of Technology; City College of New York

Larry R. Felix is an American civil servant who served as the Director of the Bureau of Engraving and Printing (BEP) within the United States Department of the Treasury from 2006 to 2015.

== Early life and education ==
Felix was born in Port of Spain and grew up in Brooklyn, New York. He earned degrees from the New York City College of Technology and City College of New York. He did doctoral work in Political Economy at Columbia University.

== Career ==
Felix began his career at the BEP in 1993. He progressed through several positions at the BEP including Chief of the Office of External Relations, Associate Director of Technology, and Deputy Director. He also chaired the Interagency Currency Design taskforce, a group responsible for recommending technical enhancements to U.S. currency design.

Secretary of the Treasury John W. Snow named Felix Director of the BEP on January 11, 2006. As director, Felix was responsible for the overall operations of the BEP in the production of U.S. currency and other government secured documents.

Under Felix’s leadership, the BEP completed the design of the next generation of currency series including the next generation $100 note, which was put into circulation on October 8, 2013. The next generation $100 note is the most complex note of any United States currency series to date.

Felix lead the effort to design and produce accessible currency for individuals that are blind and visually impaired. In 2011, the BEP developed a free, downloadable mobile application, EyeNote®, to denominate U.S. currency. The U.S. government used it to distribute currency reader devices to eligible blind and visually impaired individuals.

As currency designs became more technologically complex, Felix updated the BEP’s quality management system and implementing a massive retooling effort to transition into a 21st-century manufacturing plant. He was also directing the effort to produce notes in a 50-subject sheet format. Progressing from 32-subjects on a sheet to 50-subjects on a sheet gives the BEP the ability to produce more notes with greater efficiency to meet its annual currency order and production demands, while increasing printing capabilities.

Felix retired from the Treasury Department on January 31, 2015.

Government offices
Preceded by Thomas A. Ferguson	Director of the Bureau of Engraving and Printing; January 2006 – January 2015	Succeeded by Leonard R. Olijar
