= Denys Puech =

French sculptor (1854–1942)

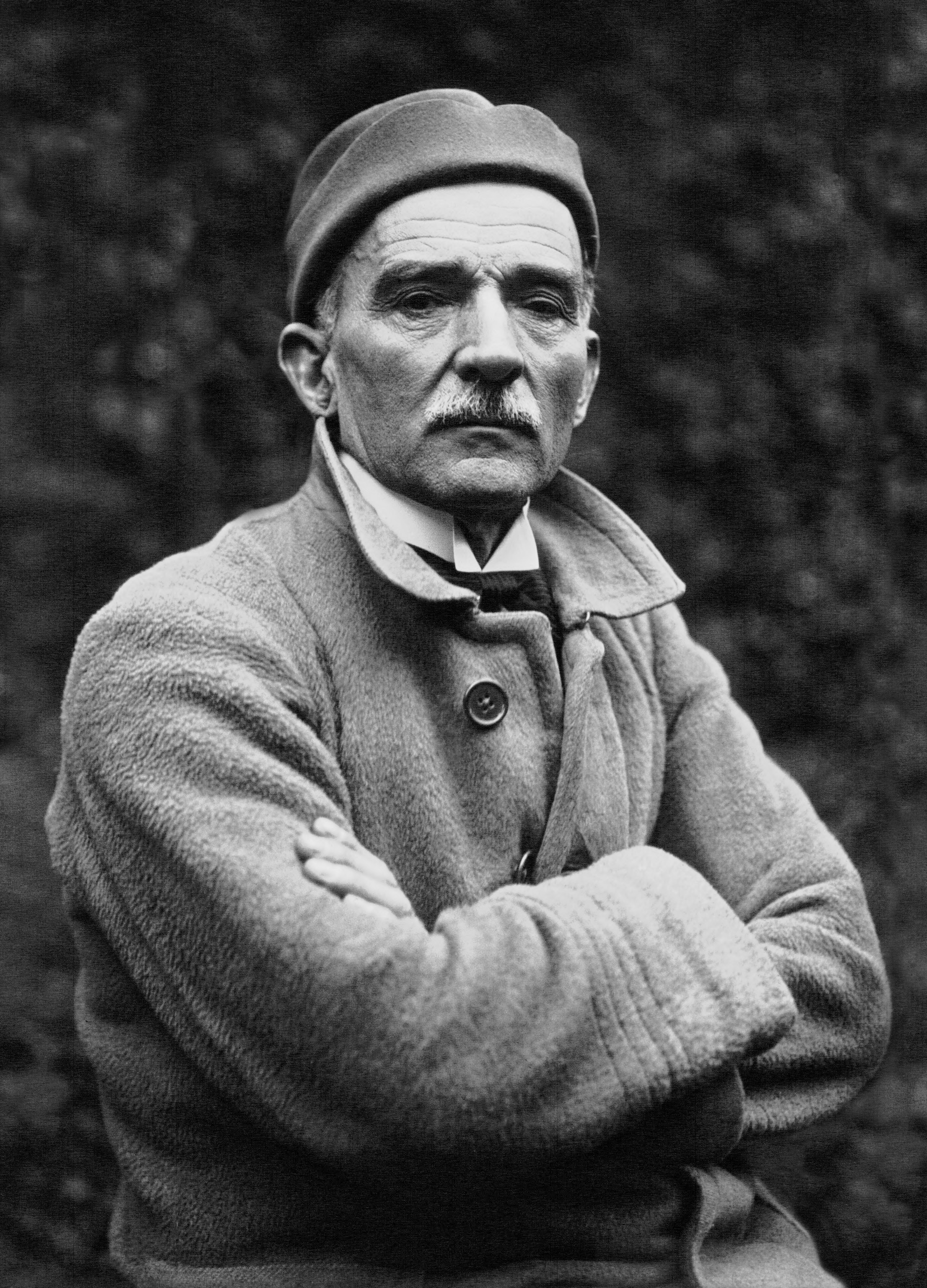
Denys Puech.

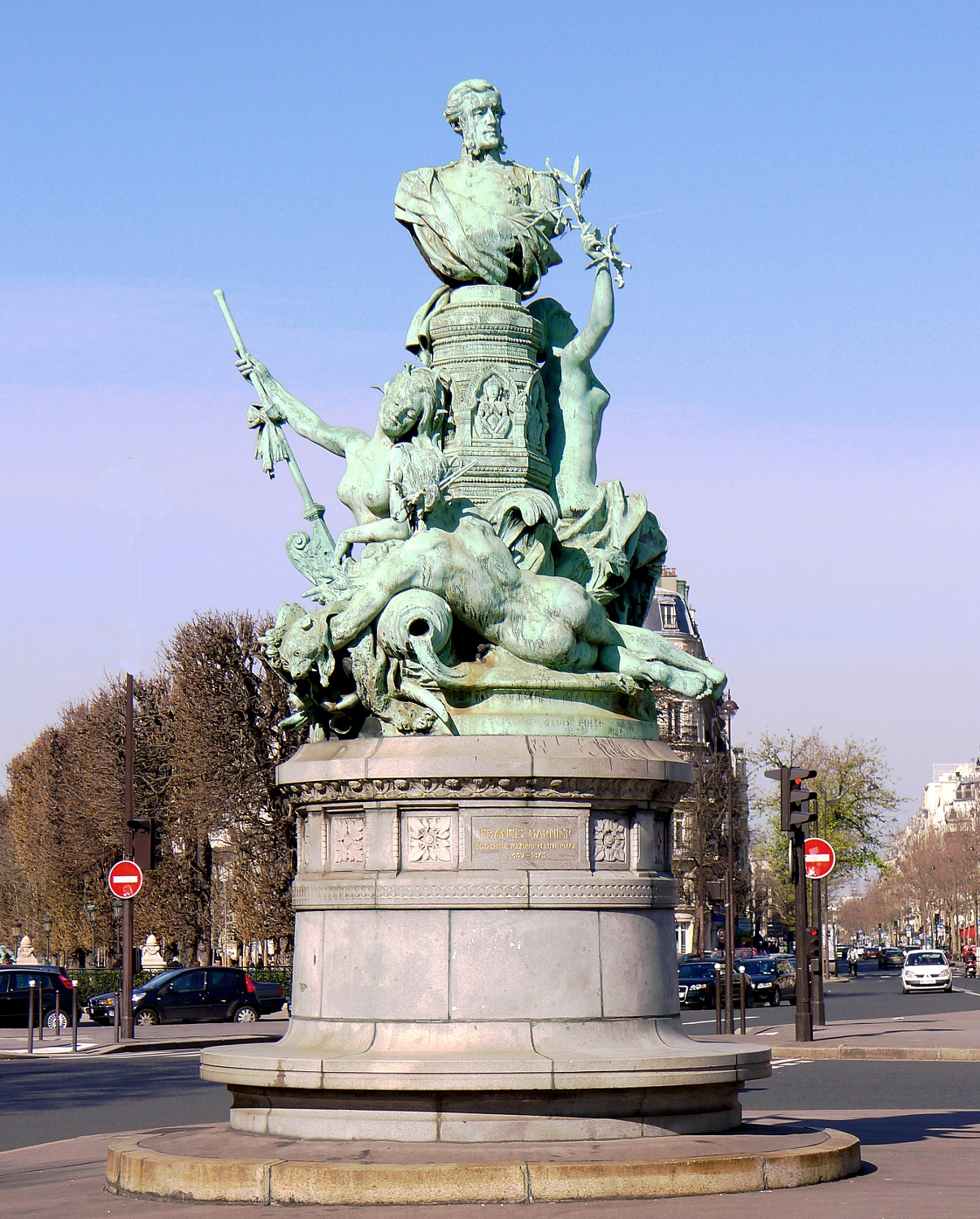
Monument to Francis Garnier (1898), Paris.

Denys Puech (3 December 1854, Gavernac, Bozouls, Aveyron – December 1942, Rodez, Aveyron) was a French sculptor.

== Biography ==
From a family of farmers (his brother was Louis Puech, Député for the Seine Department from 1898 to 1932, and Minister of Public Works from 3 November 1910 to 27 February 1911), he began as an apprentice in the marble workshop of François Mahoux in Rodez. In 1872, after two years training, he pursued an apprenticeship in Paris in the workshop of François Jouffroy then of Alexandre Falguière and Henri Chapu, at the same time following an evening course at the Beaux-Arts.

1881 and 1883 saw his first successes, when he twice won the second prize in the prix de Rome contest, for his Tyrtaeus singing the Messanians (Tyrtée chantant les Messéniennes) and Diagoras dying for joy on learning of his two victorious children's triumph at the Olympic Games (Diagoras mourant de joie en apprenant le triomphe de ses deux enfants vainqueurs aux Jeux Olympiques) respectively. He at last won first prize in 1884, with Wounded Mezentius (Mézence blessé).

From then on he received several official commissions from the French Third Republic, sculpting (among others) busts of Jules Ferry (1895), Charles Augustin Sainte-Beuve (1898), Émile Loubet (1901) and Benito Mussolini (1925). In all, 573 works are inventoried. He founded a museum of fine art in Rodez in 1903 (now the Musée Denys-Puech). The building, inaugurated in 1910, was designed by him in conjunction with the architect Boyer to best show off his sculptures.

He was elected a member of the Académie des Beaux-Arts in 1905, and made a knight of the Légion d'honneur on 17 January 1908. On 13 May 1908, he married princess Anina Gagarine Stourdza (1 June 1865 – 14 April 1918), a painter herself, of whom he sculpted a statue holding a painter's palette in 1914. He was Director of the French Academy in Rome from 1921 to 1933.

Among those who studied with him were the American sculptors Clara Hill, Ernest Keyser and Helen Farnsworth Mears.

== Works ==
- Aurora, 1900, Paris, Musée d'Orsay.
- La Pensée, 1902, polychrome marble, Paris, Petit-Palais.
- Nymph of Night, 1904.
