= O. H. Irish =

American diplomat

Orsamus Hylas Irish
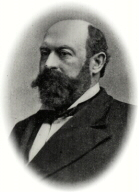
- Born: 1830; New York, U.S.
- Died: January 27, 1883 (aged 52–53); Washington, D.C., U.S.
- Resting place: Oak Hill Cemetery; Washington, D.C., U.S.
- Occupations: Newspaper editor & owner, lawyer, diplomat, nursery owner, government bureaucrat
- Employer(s): U.S. Government, self-employed
- Title: Chief of the Bureau of Engraving and Printing, Department of the Treasury, US
- Term: 1878–1883
- Political party: Republican
- Spouse: Mary J. McCann
- Children: 3
- Relatives: Sarepta Myrenda Irish Henry, sister

Orsamus Hylas Irish (1830–1883) was an official in the United States Department of the Treasury who served as Chief of the Bureau of Engraving and Printing from 1878 to 1883.

== Biography ==
O. H. Irish, son of Horatio Nelson Irish and Mary (Clark) Irish, was born in 1830 (or perhaps 1831) and raised in New York City. He was educated in Erie, Pennsylvania.

In 1855 Irish was listed as a director and secretary of the North Western Insurance Company located at 76 Walnut Street, Philadelphia.

While in Philadelphia he lived at 53 Melon Street and had another business at 320 N. 12th Street.

In 1857, Irish moved to Nebraska, a territory at the time, where later was the owner and editor of The Daily Press in Nebraska City, Nebraska. On May 15, 1861, he became Indian agent at the Omaha Reservation. Also in 1861 (October 9) he was appointed U.S. Postmaster in Black Bird County, Nebraska Territory. Irish was appointed Superintendent of Indian Affairs for Utah in the Bureau of Indian Affairs in 1864, with offices in Salt Lake City.

On June 8, 1865, Irish executed, on behalf of the U.S. Government as Superintendent of Indian Affairs for the Utah Territory, an agreement(called the Spanish Fork Treaty) with the Timpanogos (Tim-p-nogs) Nation Uintah Valley Reservation. Brigham Young was a witness.

He returned to Nebraska in 1866 as an internal revenue collector, later resuming his newspaper career as the editor of the Nebraska City Press.

In mid-October, 1867, Irish attended the first session of the Nebraska State Teachers' Association at Brownsville, Nebraska. During that session he was elected to the post of City Secretary.

In 1868, Irish was identified as the E. Commander of the Mt. Olivet Commandery No.2 of the Masonic Orders of the Red Cross Knights Templar and Knights of Malta

Also in 1868, he served as a director and Vice President of the St Lous & Nebraska Trunk Railroad.

In 1869, Irish was appointed U.S. Consul in Dresden, Kingdom of Saxony before the unification of Germany. He was confirmed as U.S. Consul by the U.S. Senate on January 25, 1870. He returned to Nebraska in 1873, entering the nursery business, a business that failed in 1875 when his nursery was wiped out by grasshoppers (most likely the Rocky Mountain locust).

He served on the Nebraska State Board of Agriculture in 1874.

He then moved to Washington, D.C., to practice law.

=== Political Activity ===
Active in the Republican Party, he was a delegate for the Territory of Nebraska at the 1860 Republican Convention, in Chicago, Illinois, that nominated Abraham Lincoln, 16th President of the United States. During that convention Irish represented the Territory of Nebraska as a member of the convention's executive committee.

In 1864, Irish represented Nebraska at the National Union Party's (temporary name for the Republican Party) convention. He served on the party's national committee.

Irish was appointed as the position of Third Auditor at the U.S. Treasury Department on December 31, 1875. In 1876 he was the President of the Nebraska Republican Association.

As chairman of a fund raising sub-committee (Departments of Treasury and Justice), Irish also participated in the planning activities for ceremonies surrounding the inauguration of James A. Garfield, 20th President of the United States. He attended Garfield's inaugural ball on March 5, 1881.

=== Career at the Bureau of Engraving and Printing ===
Auditors Building, completed in 1880 for a division of the Bureau of Printing and Engraving, Washington, D.C LCCN2011634656

Irish joined the Bureau of Engraving and Printing in 1877 becoming Assistant Chief of the Bureau, and Chief of the Bureau of Engraving and Printing in 1878. During his tenure as Chief, a new building was authorized and constructed on the southwest corner of 14th and B (Independence Avenue today) streets. Construction started in September 1878 and was completed in 1880.

On July 17, 1861, Congress authorized the Federal Government to print currency. Prior to that time, currency was issued by banks. At first the printing was accomplished with private printing companies with some final processing done at the U.S. Treasury. It was during Irish's tenure that the Treasury Department became the sole printer of U.S. currency.

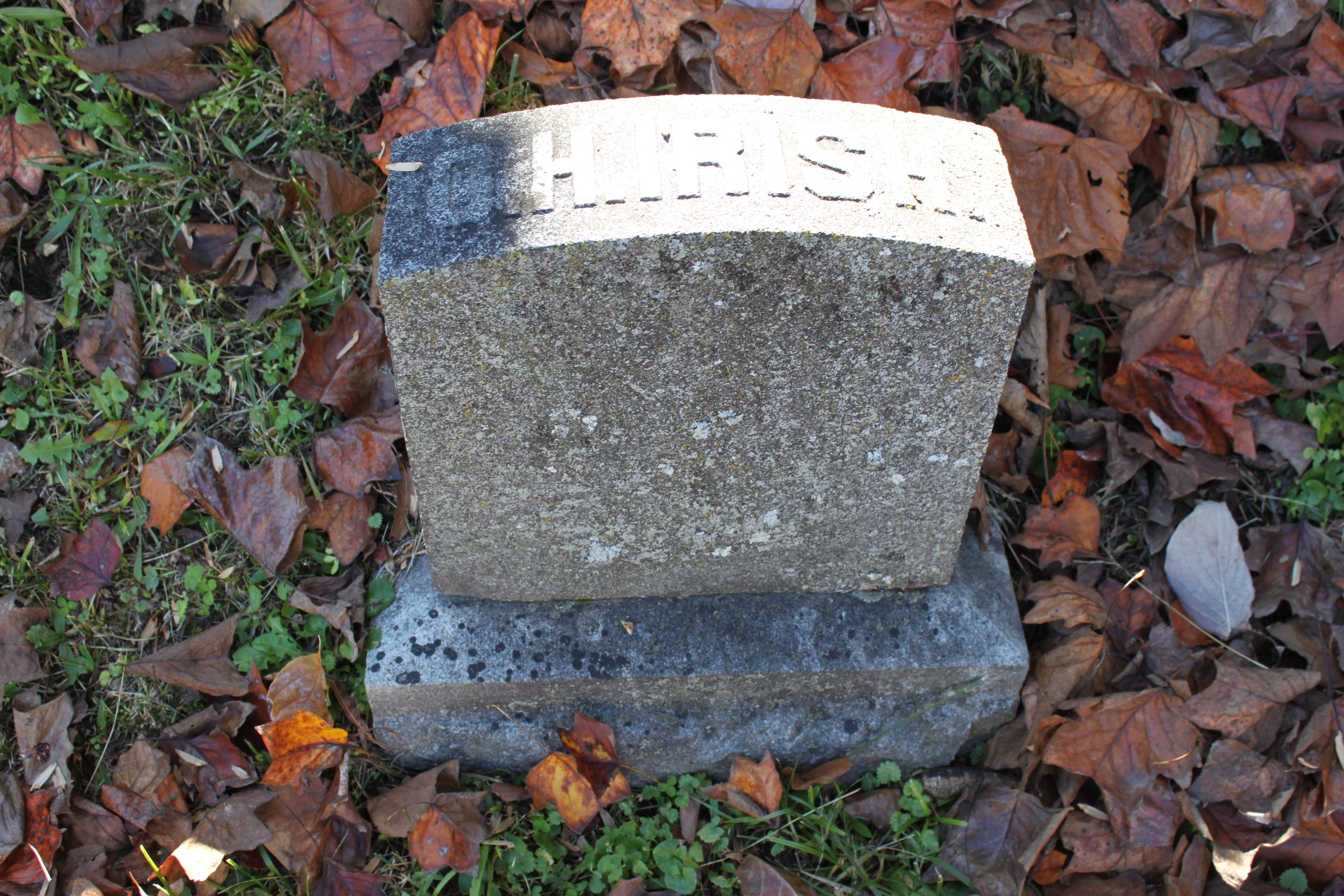
Grave of Irish at Oak Hill Cemetery

Irish held the office of Chief until his sudden death in 1883. His funeral was on January 30, 1883, at the New York Avenue Presbyterian Church, Washington, D.C., with his burial at the Oak Hill Cemetery (Washington, D.C.).

He is the namesake to Mount Irish, in Nevada.

Government offices
Preceded by Edward McPherson	Chief of the Bureau of Engraving and Printing; 1878–1883	Succeeded by Truman N. Burrill
