= Clara Hill (sculptor) =

American sculptor (1870–1935)

- Born: 1870; Hyde Park, Massachusetts, U.S.
- Died: July 16, 1935 (aged 64–65)
- Resting place: Rock Creek Cemetery; Washington, D.C., U.S.
- Known for: Sculpture

Clara Lavinia Hill (September 1870 – July 16, 1935) was an American sculptor.

Hill was born in Hyde Park, Massachusetts, but moved to Washington, D.C. early in her life. She was the daughter of John R. Hill, chief of the engraving division of the Bureau of Engraving and Printing, and was the sister of Louis A. Hill. A student of Augustus Saint-Gaudens, she also had lessons at the Académie Julian and the Académie Colarossi in Paris. Her instructors in France included Denys Puech and Jean Injalbert. Hill ran her own art school for many years, first on Dupont Circle and later on H Street, N.W. Beginning in 1922, she also taught alongside Catharine Carter Critcher, who also ran a school in Washington. Hill designed the decorations depicting Abraham Lincoln that were used as part of the decor on the American pavilion of the Exposition Universelle of 1900; they are currently unlocated, as are a number of her other known works, which were inventoried by the University of Delaware in 1985. During her career she showed work at the Paris Salon, the National Academy of Design, the Pennsylvania Academy of Fine Arts, the Art Institute of Chicago, the Corcoran Gallery of Art, the Maryland Institute, and the District of Columbia chapter of the National League of American Pen Women. In 1908 she showed several pieces at the Bauer-Folsom Gallery in New York City alongside paintings by Emil Carlsen. The following year she received the grand prize at the Alaska-Yukon-Pacific Exposition; she also exhibited work at the Panama-Pacific International Exhibition in 1915. Hill was a charter member of the Arts Club of Washington, and was long associated with the Society of Washington Artists, with whom she exhibited from 1901 until 1932 and with whom she was serving as an officer at the time of her death. She was also a founder of the Miniature Painters, Sculptors and Gravers Society of Washington, of which she served as president in the year of her death. Hill is buried in the family plot at Rock Creek Cemetery, where she has no marker of her own.
