= William Morton Meredith =

American Director of Bureau of Engraving and Printing

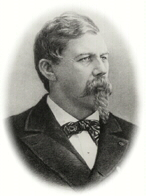
- Born: 1835; Centerville, Indiana
- Died: 1917 (aged 81–82)

William Morton Meredith (1835–1917) was an official in the United States Department of the Treasury who was Director of the Bureau of Engraving and Printing from 1889 to 1893 and from 1900 to 1906.

== Biography ==
William Morton Meredith was born in Centerville, Indiana in 1835, the son of Samuel C. Meredith and his wife Margaret (Ballard) Meredith. He attended a year of college, but left shortly to work in his father's printing office. He later worked for the Indianapolis Journal. He married Emiline "Emma" Schelenberger in 1859.

With the outbreak of the American Civil War, Meredith enlisted in the Union Army, but Governor of Indiana Oliver Hazard Perry Morton soon appointed Meredith state commissary-general. In 1862, Meredith formed a company of volunteers made up mostly of printers and was selected as the company's captain. This company was a part of the 70th Regiment Indiana Infantry under the command of Benjamin Harrison. While he was posted at Wauhatchie in March 1864, he received a telegram informing him that his wife had contracted spotted fever; she later died of this illness. He was present at the Battle of Resaca (May 13–15, 1864), an event he wrote about in the Chicago Current in 1886. He developed a hernia because of a hard-riding horse and was discharged from the Union Army in Atlanta, Georgia in August 1864.

After leaving the Army, Meredith returned to the Indianapolis Journal. He married Terressa A. Richey in 1867. He later moved to the St. Louis Democrat. He joined the Western Bank Note Company in Chicago in 1875 as superintendent of plate printing.

In 1889, Meredith's former commander, Benjamin Harrison, now President of the United States, named Meredith Director of the Bureau of Engraving and Printing. Meredith returned to the Western Bank Note Company in 1893. He returned as Director of the Bureau of Engraving and Printing from 1900 to 1906. He remained employed in the United States Department of the Treasury until his death of bronchopneumonia in 1917 at age 82.

Government offices
Preceded by Edward O. Graves	Director of the Bureau of Engraving and Printing; 1889–1893	Succeeded by Claude M. Johnson
Preceded by Claude M. Johnson	Director of the Bureau of Engraving and Printing; 1900–1906	Succeeded by Thomas J. Sullivan
