= Thomas A. Ferguson =

American government official (born 1950)

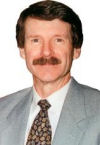
Thomas A. Ferguson

Thomas A. Ferguson (born 1950) is an American government official who was Director of the Bureau of Engraving and Printing from 1998 to 2005.

Ferguson was born in Trenton, New Jersey in 1950. He was educated at Lafayette College, receiving a B.A. in Economics. He later completed an M.P.A. from the University of Southern California.

Ferguson joined the Bureau of Engraving and Printing in 1974 as a quality assurance specialist. In 1988, he became head of the Office of Advanced Counterfeit Deterrence. He was later Deputy Assistant Director of Operations and Assistant Director of Research and Technology, in which capacity he chaired the New Currency Design Task Force.

In 1998, Ferguson became Director of the Bureau of Engraving and Printing. He held this office until 2005.

Since retiring from government service, Ferguson has run a consulting business based out of Howard County, Maryland.

Government offices
| Preceded by Larry E. Rolufs | Director of the Bureau of Engraving and Printing; 1998–2005 | Succeeded by Larry R. Felix |
