= James A. Conlon =

American government official

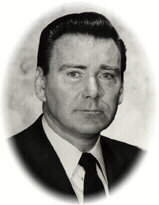
James A. Conlon

James A. Conlon (February 21, 1921 – April 6, 2000) was an official in the United States Department of the Treasury who was Director of the Bureau of Engraving and Printing from 1967 to 1977.

== Biography ==
Conlon was born and raised in New York City in 1921. He joined the Bureau of Engraving and Printing in 1942 as an apprentice plate printer. After military service in World War II, he returned to the Bureau and rose through the ranks. He went on to serve as head of the Quality Control Branch, Assistant Chief and later Chief of the Office of Currency and Stamp Manufacturing, Assistant Director of the Bureau, and then Deputy Director of the Bureau.

In 1967, Conlon became Director of the Bureau of Engraving and Printing, an office he held until 1977.

Conlon retired from government service in 1977, going to work in the private sector. He died in 2000.

Government offices
Preceded by Henry J. Holtzclaw	Director of the Bureau of Engraving and Printing; 1967–1977	Succeeded by Seymour Berry
