= Henry C. Jewell =

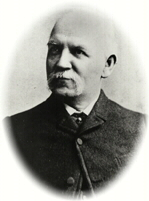
Henry C. Jewell

Henry C. Jewell (1827–1908) was an official in the United States Department of the Treasury who was Chief of the Bureau of Engraving and Printing from 1876 to 1877.

== Biography ==
Henry C. Jewell was born in Georgetown (Washington, D.C.) in 1827 and raised in Georgetown. He attended seminaries in Washington, D.C., and went to school in New York City.

After college, Jewell joined the United States Navy as an engineer. After leaving the navy, he was the chief accountant of a private banking firm.

Jewell later joined the Bureau of Engraving and Printing. He was Chief of the Bureau of Engraving and Printing from 1876 to 1877.

Jewell died in Georgetown in 1908 at age 80.

Government offices
Preceded by George B. McCartee	Chief of the Bureau of Engraving and Printing; 1876 – 1877	Succeeded by Edward McPherson
