= Thomas J. Sullivan =

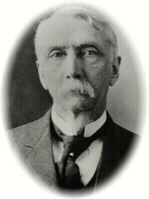
Thomas J. Sullivan

Thomas J. Sullivan (1845–1908) was an official in the United States Department of the Treasury who was Director of the Bureau of Engraving and Printing from 1906 to 1908.

== Biography ==
Thomas J. Sullivan was born in Washington, D.C. in 1845.

He was educated at Georgetown University, receiving an LL.B. and an LL.M. After college, Sullivan worked as a bookkeeper for a private banking firm. He then became a clerk in the Freedmen's Bureau.

In 1869, Sullivan joined the Bureau of Engraving and Printing as an accountant. He became the Bureau's principal accountant in 1872. In 1882, he was appointed Assistant Director of the Bureau and twice functioned as the acting director in 1883 and 1900. On June 1, 1906, he became Director of the Bureau of Engraving and Printing, succeeding William Morton Meredith. He died in office, of pneumonia, less than two years later, in 1908.

Government offices
Preceded by William Morton Meredith	Director of the Bureau of Engraving and Printing; 1906 – 1908	Succeeded by Joseph E. Ralph
