= Joseph E. Ralph =

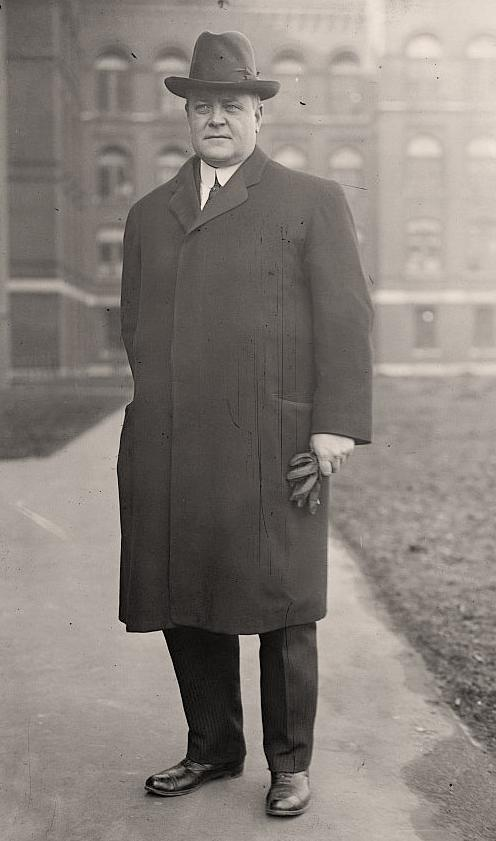
Joseph E. Ralph

Joseph E. Ralph (1863–1922) was an official in the United States Department of the Treasury who was Director of the Bureau of Engraving and Printing from 1908 to 1917.

== Biography ==
Joseph E. Ralph was born in Pennsylvania in 1863. He was raised in Joliet, Illinois.

After school, Ralph apprenticed in a steel works machine shop, ultimately becoming an expert mechanic. He was active in union and political activities. By these connections, he became Assistant Postmaster of the United States House of Representatives. He was later Superintendent of Construction at Ellis Island. He worked for the United States Customs Service as Deputy Collector at the World's Columbian Exposition in Chicago in 1893.

Ralph joined the Bureau of Engraving and Printing in 1895 as a plate cleaner. In 1897, he became Custodian of Dies and Rolls. He was made Assistant Director of the Bureau in 1906. Upon the sudden death of Thomas J. Sullivan in 1908, Ralph replaced Sullivan as Director of the Bureau of Engraving and Printing. He resigned from the Bureau in 1917.

After leaving government service, Ralph headed a banknote company. He later became assistant to the president of U.S. Steel.

Ralph died suddenly in 1922 at age 59.

Government offices
Preceded by Thomas J. Sullivan	Director of the Bureau of Engraving and Printing; 1908 – 1917	Succeeded by James L. Wilmeth
