= Louis A. Hill =

US Treasury official (1865–1933)

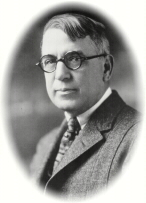
Louis A. Hill

Louis A. Hill (1865–1933) was an official in the United States Department of the Treasury who was Director of the Bureau of Engraving and Printing from 1922 to 1924.

== Biography ==
Louis A. Hill was born in Boston in 1865. He was educated at Columbian University.

After college, Hill worked as an engraver in Philadelphia. His father, John R. Hill, worked as an engraver in the Bureau of Engraving and Printing from 1882 to 1913. With his father's encouragement, Louis A. Hill joined the Bureau of Engraving and Printing in 1900. He rose through the ranks, becoming Assistant Chief of the Engraving Division in 1913.

In 1922, in a surprise move, President of the United States Warren G. Harding issued an executive order dismissing Director of the Bureau of Engraving and Printing James L. Wilmeth and 28 other top officials in the Bureau of Engraving and Printing. Hill thus became Director of the Bureau of Engraving and Printing, holding that post from 1922 to 1924.

Hill retired in 1924. He died in Washington, D.C., in 1933. His sister was the sculptor Clara Hill.

Government offices
Preceded by James L. Wilmeth	Director of the Bureau of Engraving and Printing; 1922 – 1924	Succeeded by Wallace W. Kirby
