= Seymour Berry =

American lawyer

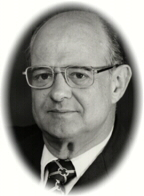
Seymour Berry

Seymour Berry (November 22, 1922 – December 6, 2008) was an official in the United States Department of the Treasury who was Director of the Bureau of Engraving and Printing from 1977 to 1979.

== Biography ==
Seymour Berry was born in New York City in 1922. He grew up in New York. In 1942, Berry joined the Bureau of Engraving and Printing. With the U.S.'s entry into World War II, he served in the United States Army and received the Purple Heart after he was wounded at the Battle of Hürtgen Forest. After the war, in 1946, he returned to the Bureau of Engraving and Printing. While working at the Bureau, he attended night school at George Washington University, graduating in 1951. He received a law degree from George Washington University Law School in 1953.

Berry spent his entire career at the Bureau of Engraving and Printing, working successively as plate printer, foreman, superintendent of the examining division, chief of the Office of Securities Processing, and assistant director for administration. In 1977, he became Director of the Bureau of Engraving and Printing, a position he held until 1979.

Berry retired in 1979, settling in Silver Spring, Maryland. He died at his home in Silver Spring of Dementia with Lewy bodies on December 6, 2008.

Government offices
Preceded by James A. Conlon	Director of the Bureau of Engraving and Printing; 1977–1979	Succeeded by Harry R. Clements
