= Sarah Blakeslee (painter) =

American painter

- Mrs. Speight's artwork (cropped)
- Born: January 13, 1912; Evanston, Illinois
- Died: January 12, 2005 (aged 92); Philadelphia, Pennsylvania
- Known for: painting

Sarah Jane Blakeslee (January 13, 1912 – January 12, 2005) was an American landscape and portrait painter.

== Education ==
Born in Evanston, Illinois, Blakeslee studied as a teenager at the Art Institute of Chicago and the Corcoran School of Art. She also took lessons at the private school in Washington, D.C. run by Catharine Carter Critcher, who encouraged her to enroll in the Chester Springs branch of the Pennsylvania Academy of the Fine Arts once she had graduated from high school. While there, she received two Cresson Traveling Scholarships.

== Family life ==
Among Blakeslee's instructors at the academy was Francis Speight, whom she married on November 7, 1936, shortly after graduating. In 1961, Speight took a position as artist in residence at East Carolina University (then East Carolina College), and the couple moved south. Blakeslee continued teaching and painting in her new home, continuing following her husband's death in 1989. She rented out rooms to international students until 1998, when she retired and returned to Pennsylvania to be near her daughter. She died on January 12, 2005, in the Center City, Philadelphia neighborhood.

== Exhibits ==
She was a regular exhibitor at the Pennsylvania Academy of the Fine Arts from 1938 until 1964, and showed work at the North Carolina Museum of Art, and the Golden Gate International Exposition at the 1939 World's Fair. She was involved with the Works Progress Administration during the Great Depression, and in 1938 painted a mural, Apple Orchard, for the post office in Strasburg, Virginia, where it may still be seen. Among the institutions which hold examples of her work are the North Carolina Museum of Art; the Pennsylvania Academy of the Fine Arts; the Greenville Museum of Art in North Carolina, which dedicated a gallery to her work and that of her husband in 2002; the Muskegon Museum of Art; and the Cameron Art Museum. She is also represented in the Johnson Collection of art from the Southern United States. Her papers are held along with those of her husband in the library of the University of North Carolina at Chapel Hill.

== Awards ==
Blakeslee received numerous awards during her career, including the Mary Smith prize of the Pennsylvania Academy of the Fine Arts, in 1940; the Ranger Fund purchase prize of the National Academy of Design; first prize at the Woodmere Gallery in Chestnut Hill, Pennsylvania, in 1952; and first prize and a gold medal from the National Exhibition in Ligonier, Pennsylvania, in 1961. In 1994 she received a North Carolina Award for her work. In 1996, her artwork was featured, along with 44 other artists, in an exhibit in Yellow Springs, Pennsylvania of attendees of the Pennsylvania Academy of the Fine Arts. Art critic Victoria Donohoe praised the quality of her work.
