= Robert J. Leuver =

Robert Joseph Leuver
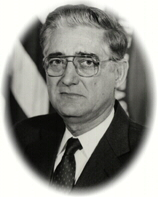
- Born: 2 February 1927; Chicago, Illinois, U.S.
- Education: The Catholic University of America (Master's degree)
- Occupation: Government official
- Known for: Director of the Bureau of Engraving and Printing (1983–1988)

Robert Joseph Leuver (born February 2, 1927) was an official in the United States Department of the Treasury who was Director of the Bureau of Engraving and Printing from 1983 to 1988.

== Biography ==
Robert Joseph Leuver was born on February 2, 1927, in Chicago, Illinois. He was raised there, and in Buffalo, New York. He was educated at The Catholic University of America, receiving a master's degree.

Leuver spent several years working as a high school and college teacher. He then went on to hold various managerial and administrative positions in educational and business institutions.

In 1972, Leuver joined ACTION. He later joined the United States Department of the Treasury, holding managerial positions in the Employee Data and Payroll Division and then the Management Information Systems program. He moved to the Bureau of Engraving and Printing in 1979, becoming the Bureau's Deputy Director. He became Director of the Bureau of Engraving and Printing in 1983, holding this office until 1988.

Leuver spent the next decade as Executive Director of the American Numismatic Association. He also worked as a consultant on issues related to currency. Leuver has received multiple accolades for his outstanding management, including President Ronald Reagan's Distinguished Executive Award.

Government offices
Preceded by Harry R. Clements	Director of the Bureau of Engraving and Printing; 1983–1988	Succeeded by Peter H. Daly
