= Catharine Carter Critcher =

American painter

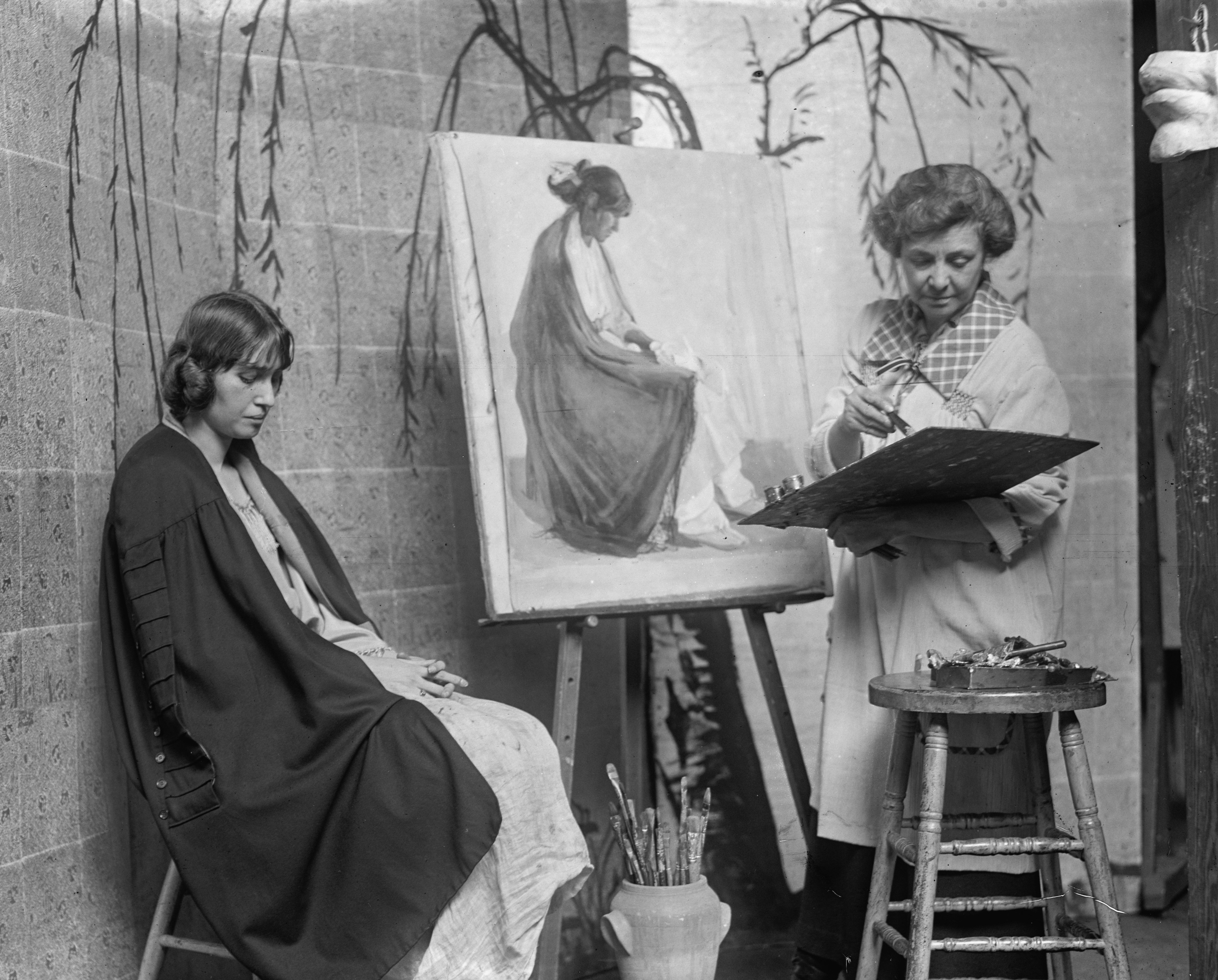
- Critcher in 1923
- Born: September 13, 1868; Westmoreland County, Virginia, US
- Died: June 11, 1964 (aged 95); Blackstone, Virginia, US
- Resting place: Ivy Hill Cemetery (Alexandria, Virginia)
- Education: Cooper Union; Corcoran School of Art; Académie Julian
- Known for: Portrait painting
- Elected: Taos Society of Artists

Catharine (sometimes Catherine) Carter Critcher (September 13, 1868 – June 11, 1964) was an American painter. A native of Westmoreland County, Virginia, she worked in Paris and Washington, D.C. before becoming, in 1924, a member of the Taos Society of Artists, the only woman ever elected to that body. She was a long time member of the Arts Club of Washington.

== Biography ==
Critcher was the daughter of Judge John Critcher and Elizabeth "Lizzie" Thomasia Kennon (Whiting) Critcher; she was their fourth daughter and the youngest of their five children. She grew up on the family plantation, Audley, in Oak Grove, Virginia, and showed an early interest in equestrianism and painting.

Critcher's first studies came at the Arlington Institute in Virginia. She then studied at Cooper Union in New York City for a year, with Eliphalet Frazer Andrews at the Corcoran School of Art in Washington, D.C., and also with Richard Emil Miller and Charles Hoffbauer. She soon began receiving commissions, producing a number of portraits of members of prominent Virginia families. In 1897 she was occupying studio space in the former Minor house in Alexandria, located on North Alfred Street. She traveled to Paris in 1904, remaining in that city for several years. Initially she enrolled at the Académie Julian, where she studied under Charles Hoffbauer and Jean-Paul Laurens; her time there was made difficult due to troubles with the French language. She founded the Cours Critcher in 1905 in an attempt to aid American artists in gaining admission to French schools, an enterprise in which she had the assistance of Miller and Hoffbauer. Mindful of her previous linguistic troubles, she designed a school where instruction was offered in English. To make extra money she acted as a tour guide for Americans visiting Europe during the summer months. Critcher exhibited at the Paris Salon during her time in the city, and served as president of the American Women Painters in Paris.

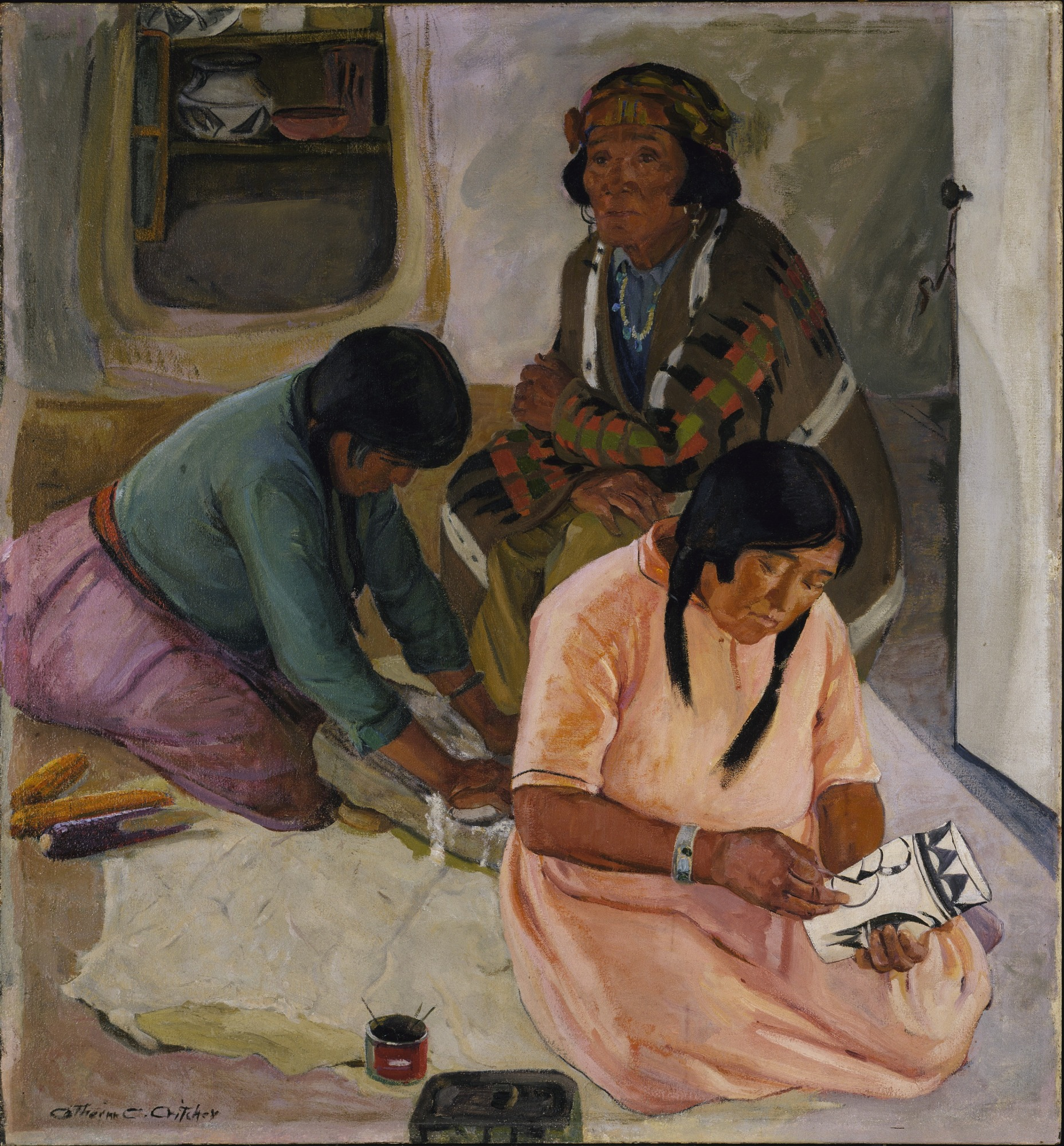
Indian Women Making Pottery, oil on canvas, c. 1924, in the collection of the Smithsonian American Art Museum

In 1909 Critcher returned to the United States and began teaching at her alma mater, the Corcoran, where she remained on the faculty until 1919; her pupils there included Lillian Elvira Moore Abbot. In 1919 she founded another school, this time in Washington, called variously The School of Painting and Applied Arts or the Critcher School. There instructors offered one- and two-year courses in fine and commercial art, teaching a variety of styles and disciplines. She ran the school until 1940, when she decided to devote herself to painting full-time. In 1922 Critcher began teaching with sculptor Clara Hill. During the 1930s she ran the Red Rock Cove Art Camp on property which she rented near Saltville, Virginia. During the 1910s and 1920s she lived at The Woodley in Washington. Her studio was located on St. Matthew's Court; this is also given as the first address of her school, which later moved to a location along Connecticut Avenue. Among the institution's pupils was Sarah Blakeslee, whom Critcher encouraged to enroll in the Chester Springs branch of the Pennsylvania Academy of the Fine Arts upon graduation from high school. Critcher was assisted in running the school by her sister Louisa Kennon Critcher, known as "Lulie", who was also an artist.

Critcher paid her first visit to Taos, New Mexico in 1920, and would return for many summers. She was quite taken with the town, saying, "no place could be more conducive of work. There are models galore and no phones." In 1924 the all-male Taos Society of Artists unanimously voted her in as a member, accepting the candidacy of E. Martin Hennings at the same meeting. The honor brought her great pleasure; she wrote to her friend, C. Powell Minnigerode, "You will be pleased, I know, to hear that a letter just rec’d from Mr. Couse informs me that I have been unanimously elected to active membership in the Taos Society of Artists. It is nice to be the first and only woman in it. I am feeling very good about it." Unlike many members of the Taos Society, Critcher never lived in New Mexico permanently, choosing to summer there instead for several years; it was said of her that she would return to Washington "with a wrinkled, deeply suntanned skin in the 1920s when that was not fashionable". She traveled widely elsewhere as well in search of subjects, visiting the Laurentian Mountains of Canada and spending time in Mexico and in Gloucester, Massachusetts; she also passed several summers in Provincetown, Massachusetts, where she was a member of the local art association. In 1928 she spent two months on the Hopi Reservation in Arizona. In the 1940s and 1950s she lived in Charles Town, West Virginia, completing at least forty-two portraits during her residence there.

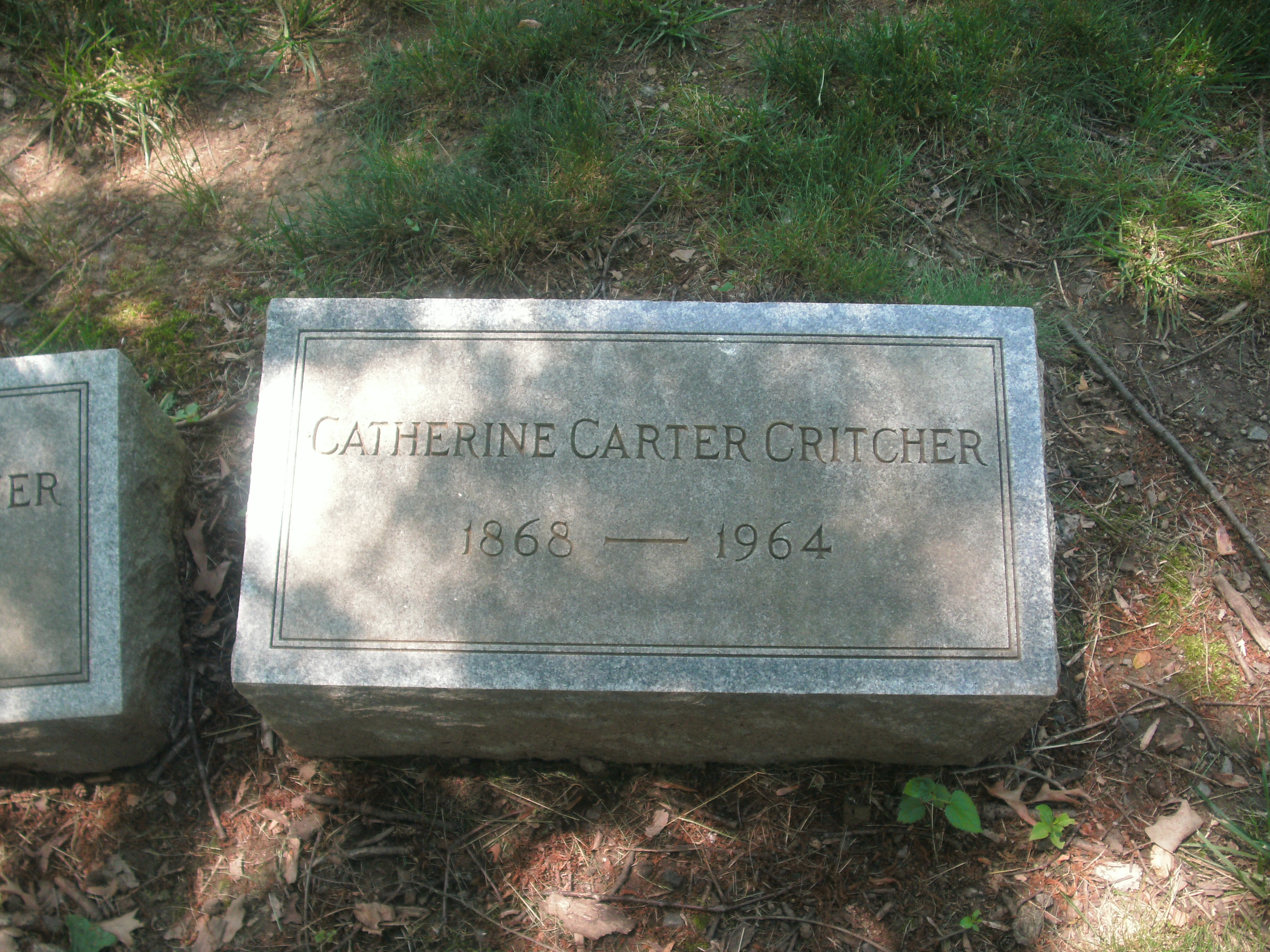
Critcher's grave marker; note the misspelling on the stone.

Critcher never married, although she was courted by a number of men including John Mosby. Late in her career, her health began to fail, and she moved to Norfolk, Virginia, to live with a niece. She died in a nursing home in Blackstone, Virginia; the place of her death is given in some references as Washington, D.C. Critcher's body was returned to Alexandria for burial; she was interred beside her parents and sister Louisa in the family plot at Ivy Hill Cemetery, where her name is misspelled as "Catherine" on her grave marker.

== Work ==
Critcher's early academic style has been described as "dark but pleasing", but it later developed into something powerfully expressive, with a vivid sense of color; in this regard it was greatly similar to the work of other Taos Society painters. She has been called "a respected artist in the European avant-garde", with an interest in symbolism and abstraction; in this regard, some of her work prefigures that of Georgia O'Keeffe. Exhibits of her art were held in 1928, at the Women's University Club of Washington, D.C.; in 1938, at the Studio Guild of New York; in 1940 at the Corcoran Gallery of Art; and in 1949 at the Washington County Museum of Fine Arts in Hagerstown, Maryland. Her work appeared in various group exhibitions as well, including at such locations as the Albright Art Gallery, the Pennsylvania Academy of the Fine Arts; the Maryland Institute, the National Academy of Design, and the Art Institute of Chicago; she also exhibited in the Greater Washington Independent Exhibition of 1935. Critcher was a member of numerous arts organizations, including the Southern States Art League, the National Association of Women Painters and Sculptors, and the Washington Water Color Club. She was a founding member of the Arts Club of Washington, and from 1911 until 1931 served on the executive committee of the Society of Washington Artists, to which organization she had initially been elected in 1896, among the earliest women to achieve membership.

Critcher received a handful of awards for her work, including a bronze medal from the Cooper Union and a gold medal from the Corcoran School, and an honorable mention at the Académie Julian. In 1914 she received a bronze medal from the Witte Museum; the same organization awarded her a silver medal in 1922, and an honorable mention in 1935. She also received three prizes from the Southern States Art League, including a first prize of $500 for her painting Taos Farmers in 1929; this painting was later included in the inaugural exhibition of the National Museum of Women in the Arts, American Women Artists 1830–1930, in 1987.

Crichter painted a large number of portraits during her career, working in a traditional and realistic style. Two of these, those of James Leal Greenleaf and Oscar E. Berninghaus, are in the collection of the National Academy of Design. Princeton University owns her portrait of Woodrow Wilson. Other notables who sat for her over the years include Senator Harry F. Byrd and twenty generals, among them George Marshall and Mark W. Clark. In April, 1896 she presented for exhibition a portrait of her father at the Essex County Courthouse in Tappahannock; this was hanging in the Westmoreland County Courthouse in Montross in 1934.

One of Critcher's Taos paintings, Indian Women Making Pottery (c. 1924), is in the Smithsonian American Art Museum. Her pieces may also be found in the collections of the San Antonio Art League, the New Mexico Museum of Art, the Museum of the Southwest, and the Eiteljorg Museum of American Indians and Western Art. Her painting The Young Hunter is owned by the Taos Art Museum, while Portrait of Star Road is part of the Haub Family Collection of Western American Art at the Tacoma Art Museum. The artist herself donated an oil painting of Zinnias to Randolph-Macon Woman's College in 1926. A portrait of John Mosby dating to before 1901 is owned by the University of Virginia, while a portrait of Abraham Lincoln, dating to 1939 and based on a work by George Peter Alexander Healy, is held by the Abraham Lincoln Presidential Library. Other paintings remain in private hands. In 1927 Critcher produced a copy of a portrait of George Wythe which she presented for display in the George Wythe House in Colonial Williamsburg.
