= Harry R. Clements =

American engineer and businessman

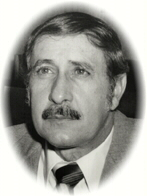
Harry R. Clements

Harry R. Clements (March 16, 1929 – May 31, 2023) was an American engineer and businessman who was Director of the Bureau of Engraving and Printing from 1979 to 1982.

== Biography ==
Harry R. Clements was born in Blackwell, Oklahoma on March 16, 1929. He was raised in Oklahoma and Kansas. After high school, Clements served briefly in the United States Army, and then attended Wichita University, receiving both a bachelor's degree and a master's degree in aeronautical engineering.

Clements spent twenty years working in the aerospace and transportation industries in a variety of engineering and managerial jobs. He entered government service in 1972 when he joined the Occupational Safety and Health Administration. In 1973, President of the United States Richard Nixon appointed Clements Deputy Director of the Rehabilitation Services Administration. In 1976, he became head of the National Industries for the Severely Handicapped.

In 1979, Clements was named Director of the Bureau of Engraving and Printing; he held this office until 1982.

Clements left government service in 1982, returning to the private sector aerospace and defense industries. He also completed a master's degree in economics from George Mason University during this time. In 1988, he returned to Kansas to head a manufacturing firm. He later taught economics at Wichita State University.

Clements died on May 31, 2023, at the age of 94.

Government offices
Preceded by Seymour Berry	Director of the Bureau of Engraving and Printing; 1979–1982	Succeeded by Robert J. Leuver
