= Henry J. Holtzclaw =

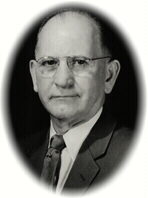
Henry J. Holtzclaw

Henry J. Holtzclaw (November 28, 1897 – January 15, 1969) was an official in the United States Department of the Treasury who was Director of the Bureau of Engraving and Printing from 1954 to 1967.

== Biography ==
Henry J. Holtzclaw was born in Virginia and educated in Washington, D.C. He joined the Bureau of Engraving and Printing in 1917 as a machinist's helper. He rose through the ranks at the Bureau and in 1931 became the Bureau's mechanical expert and designer. When the Office of Research and Development Engineering was created within the Bureau, he served as its first head. He was responsible for developing an electric eye perforator in the 1930s.

In 1949, Holtzclaw became Assistant Director of the Bureau. In 1954, he was promoted, becoming Director of the Bureau of Engraving and Printing. He held this position until he retired in 1967.

Holtzclaw died in 1969 at age 71, a little more than a year after he retired.

Government offices
Preceded by Alvin W. Hall	Director of the Bureau of Engraving and Printing; 1954 – 1967	Succeeded by James A. Conlon
