= Edward O. Graves =

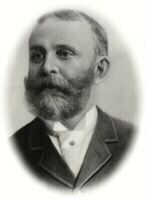
Edward O. Graves

Edward O. Graves (3 August 1843 – 1909) was a United States banker who was Chief of the Bureau of Engraving and Printing from 1885 to 1889.

== Biography ==
Edward O. Graves was born in Gravesville, New York on August 3, 1843. He attended Hobart College, graduating in 1863.

After college, Graves joined the Office of Treasurer of the United States Francis E. Spinner as a clerk. In 1868, he became chief clerk in the Treasurer's office. He later became chief examiner. On July 1, 1874, he became superintendent of the redemption agency for the redemption of national bank notes. In 1883, President of the United States Chester A. Arthur named Graves Assistant Treasurer of the United States.

In July 1885, Graves became Chief of the Bureau of Engraving and Printing. He held this office until 1889.

Graves moved to Seattle in spring 1889 to organize the Washington National Bank, becoming the Washington National Bank's president. He was the bank's president until March 1900. He died in Seattle in 1909 at the age of 65.

Government offices
Preceded by Truman N. Burrill	Chief of the Bureau of Engraving and Printing; 1885 – 1889	Succeeded by William Morton Meredith
