= Edward Grove =

Brigadier-General Edward Grove CB CBE
- Born: Edward Aickin William Stewart Grove; 4 April 1852; Montgomeryshire, Wales
- Died: 14 October 1932 (aged 80); Brighton, Sussex
- Military career
- Allegiance: United Kingdom
- Branch: British Army
- Service years: 1872–1918
- Rank: Brigadier-General
- Unit: Queen's Own Royal West Kent Regiment
- Conflicts: First Boer War, Anglo-Egyptian War, Nile Expedition, Second Boer War, First World War
- Awards: CB, CBE

Brigadier-General Edward Aickin William Stewart Grove, CB, CBE (4 April 1852 – 14 October 1932) was a senior British Army officer during the First World War.

== Biography ==
Born on 4 April 1852, Edward Grove was educated at Bedford School.

He received his first commission as a second lieutenant in the British Army in 1872, and was promoted to the rank of lieutenant on 12 November 1873.

He served in the First Boer War, in 1881, was promoted to the rank of captain in the Queen's Own Royal West Kent Regiment on 13 April 1881, and received the brevet rank of major on 18 November 1882. He served during the Nile Expedition, between 1884 and 1885, and was promoted to the substantive rank of major on 19 January 1886.

He served during the Anglo-Egyptian War, in 1892, and fought at the Battle of Tel el-Kebir. On 27 May 1896 he was appointed in command of the 2nd Battalion, Queen's Own Royal West Kent Regiment, and promoted to the rank of lieutenant colonel.

He commanded the battalion during the Second Boer War, arriving in South Africa with 1030 officers and men of the regiment on the SS Bavarian in April 1900. The battalion was part of the 17th Brigade, 8th Division, and stayed there until after the end of the war in 1902. During his stay in South Africa he was promoted to the rank of colonel on 19 August 1900.

He was appointed Brigadier General commanding the 8th Brigade, 3rd Division, between 1905 and 1909.

He served during the First World War, and was Commander of the 7th District between 1916 and 1918.

Brigadier General Edward Grove was invested as a Companion of the Order of the Bath (CB) in 1900, and as a Commander of the Order of the British Empire (CBE) in 1919.

He died at the age of 80 in Brighton, Sussex, on 14 October 1932.
