= Forum Corporation =

AchieveForum, Formerly The Forum Corporation
- Type: Wholly owned subsidiary
- Industry: Management consulting, Corporate Training and Development
- Founded: 1971; 55 years ago
- Headquarters: Boston, United States
- Area served: North America, EMEA, Asia Pacific
- Key people: Russell Becker, CEO; Cindy Stuckey, Managing Director, EMEA; Mike Wirth, Managing Director, North America; Shail Chotai, Global Head of Operations
- Website: www.achieveforum.com

The Forum Corporation is a learning and consulting company.

== History ==
=== Early years ===
Forum was founded in 1971. Five partners, several of whom had recently graduated from Harvard Business School, initially self-funded the startup. By 1982 it was ranked 362 on the Inc. 500 list of the fastest growing private companies in America, with 170 employees and 40 part-time instructors. As clients moved, the company began conducting operations overseas in the late 1970s.

=== Acquisitions ===
On June 30, 2000, Forum accepted an offer by Pearson, a London-based media conglomerate, to purchase Forum for US$90 million (GBP 60 million) in cash. Pearson intended to merge Forum with FT Knowledge to generate sales of US$110 million in its first year. Forum Chairman and CEO John Humphrey oversaw the integration as chairman of an international advisory board while FT Knowledge CEO Pippa Wicks became the CEO of the new company. Forum executive vice president Jennifer Potter-Brotman was promoted to CEO of Forum, as Pearson wished to keep senior Forum managers and preserve brand identity. After Forum shareholders unanimously approved the purchase, and the Federal Trade Commission approved the deal on July 10, the official announcement was released August 3.

In July 2002, the Institute for International Research (IIR) expressed interest in purchasing Forum, and as FT Knowledge began consolidating Pearson decided to launch negotiations that November. A final deal was signed on January 13, 2003, selling Forum to IIR for US$30 million. IIR was purchased itself in 2005 by the British publisher and conference company Informa.

In October 2013, Providence Equity Partners acquired Forum and four sister companies from Informa, and is now part of Providence Corporate Development Holding Company's business portfolio. In 2015, Forum's parent company was renamed Twenty Eighty.

In 2015, Forum acquired Kenexa Insight from IBM. This offering was a research base built over 30 years of studying high performance. This acquisition was the foundation of the Talent Analytics and Assessment service within the organization.

== Business ==
Forum provides learning in three main areas: leadership, sales and sales management, and Talent Analytics and Talent Assessment .
