= List of memorials to Albert Gallatin =

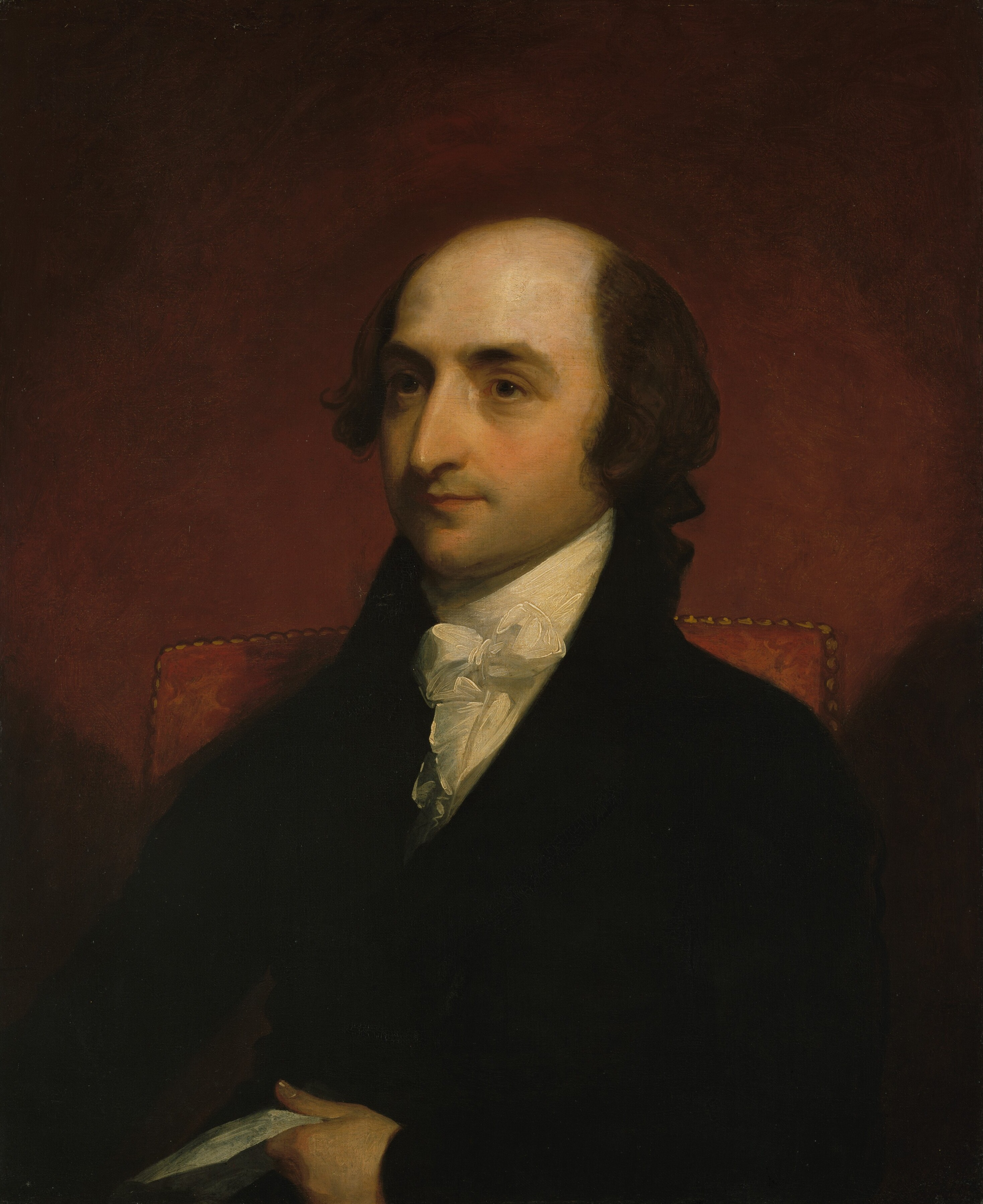
Portrait of Gallatin by Gilbert Stuart, c. 1803

The following is a list of memorials to and things named in honor of Albert Gallatin.

== Honors ==
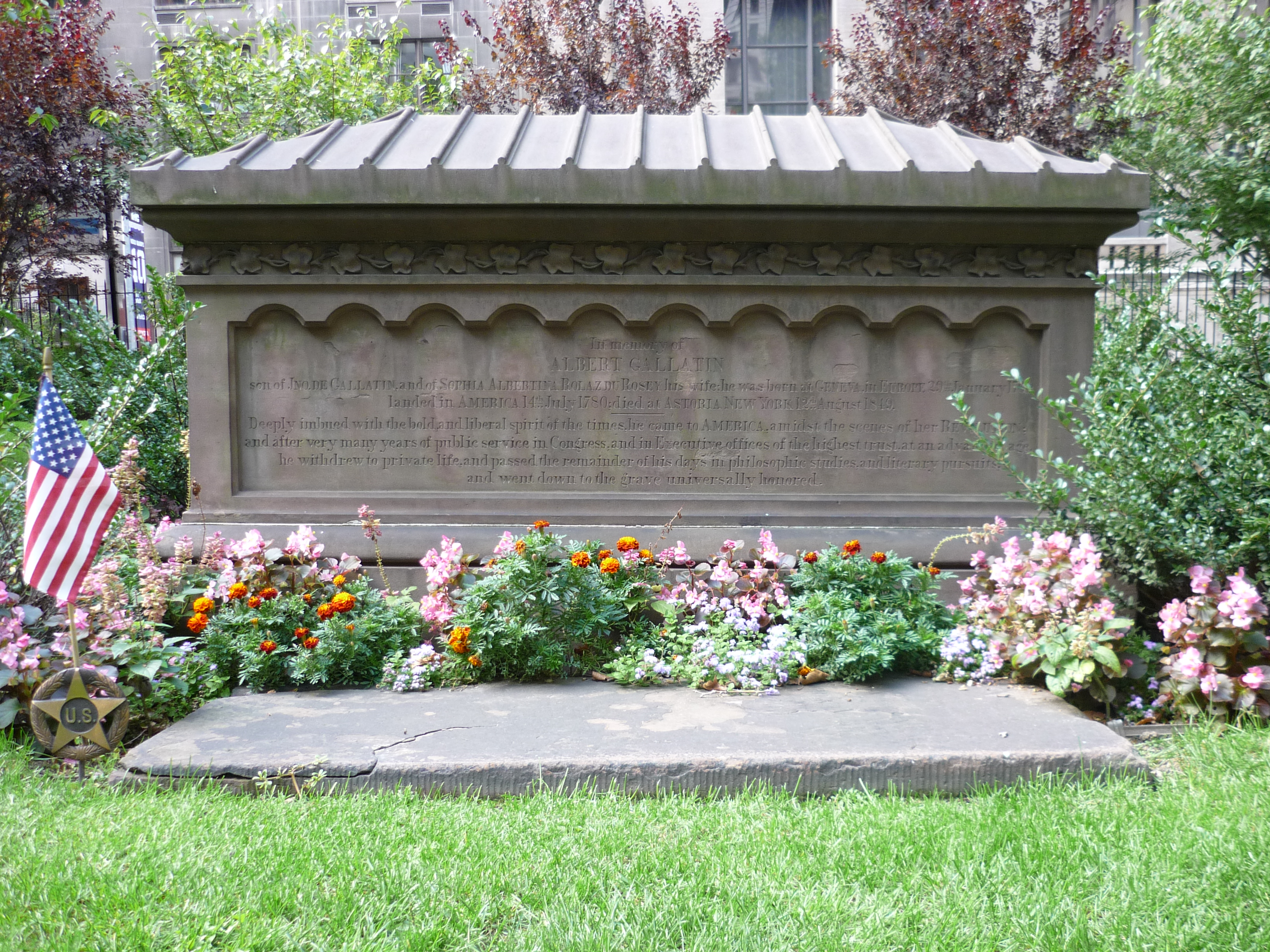
Albert Gallatin's tomb at New York's Trinity Churchyard

- Gallatin's portrait was on the front of the $500 United States Note issued in 1862–63.
- Gallatin's portrait was on the regular issue Prominent Americans series 1 1/4¢ postage stamp from 1967 to 1973.
- Friendship Hill National Historic Site, a 661-acre (2.67 km^{2}) estate which includes the beautifully restored home of Albert Gallatin, is run by the National Park Service and is located in Fayette County, Pa. It is open to the public.
- The United States Department of the Treasury's highest career service award is named the Albert Gallatin Award in his honor.
- There is a bronze statue of Albert Gallatin by James Earle Fraser located in front of the northern entrance of the Treasury Building.
- 250-ton U.S. Revenue Cutter Albert Gallatin, built in 1871 and lost in 1892.
- USCGC Gallatin (WHEC-721), a 378-foot (115 m), high-endurance Coast Guard cutter is named for him.
- The SS Albert Gallatin, a Liberty Ship built in World War II, was named for him.
- Elected a member of the American Antiquarian Society in 1836.

== Counties ==
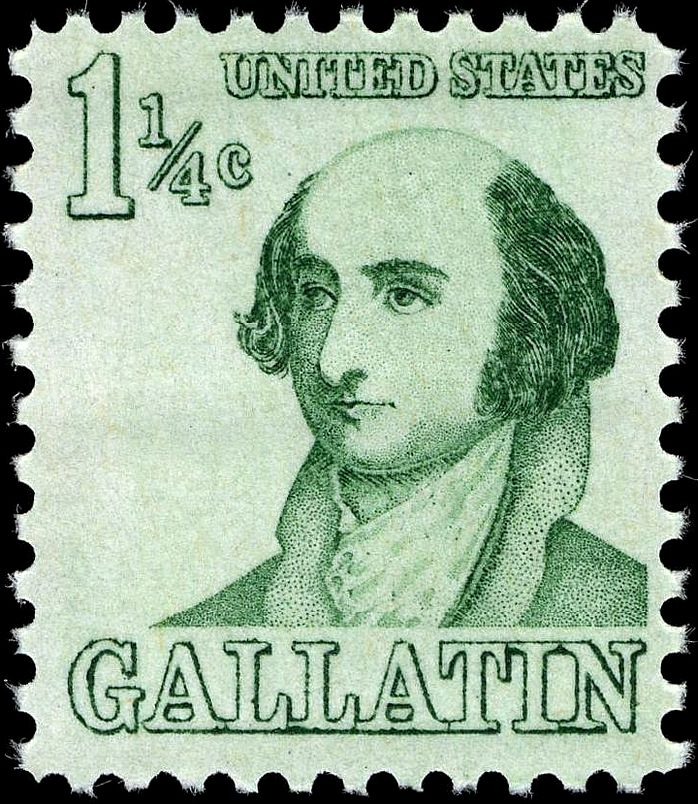
A 1967 U.S. stamp honoring Albert Gallatin

- Gallatin County, Illinois
- Gallatin County, Kentucky
- Gallatin County, Montana
- Gallatin National Forest, Montana
- Gallatin River, Montana
- Gallatin Range, Montana

== Towns ==
- Gallatin, Missouri
- Gallatin Gateway, Montana
- Gallatin, Tennessee
- Gallatin, Rusk County, Texas
- Town of Gallatin, Columbia County, New York
- Village of Gallatin, Nicholson Township, Fayette County, Pennsylvania

== Roads and Bridges ==
- Albert Gallatin Memorial Bridge - a now-demolished bridge over the Monongahela River that connected Point Marion in Fayette County, Pennsylvania and Dunkard Township in Greene County, Pennsylvania.
- Gallatin Pike in East Nashville, Tennessee
- Gallatin Street in Washington, D.C.
- Gallatin Street in Jackson, Mississippi
- Gallatin Street in Providence, Rhode Island
- Gallatin Street in Vandalia, Illinois
- Gallatin Road in Pico Rivera, California
- Gallatin Road (formerly Gallatin School House Road) in Downey, California
- Gallatin Avenue, Uniontown, Fayette County, Pennsylvania
- Avenue de Gallatin in Geneva, Switzerland

== Academia ==
- A school district in Fayette County, Pennsylvania (in which his home Friendship Hill is located) is named the Albert Gallatin Area School District in his honor.
- The Gallatin School of Individualized Study at New York University honors his participation in the founding of the university.
- The ALBERT student information system at New York University is named for him.
- Gallatin Elementary School in Downey, California
- Gallatin Hall at Harvard Business School in Boston, Massachusetts
- Gallatin Hall at Robert Morris University in Pittsburgh, Pennsylvania
