= Marion Bridge =

Marion Bridge may refer to:

- Marion Bridge (film)
- Marion Bridge (Pennsylvania), a historic bridge at Point Marion
- Marion Bridge, Nova Scotia, a rural community in Nova Scotia, Canada
