= United States Treasury Police =

The United States Treasury Police was the federal security police of the United States Department of the Treasury responsible for providing police and security to the Treasury Building and the Treasury Annex. The Police force merged into the US Secret Service Uniformed Division in 1986.

== History ==
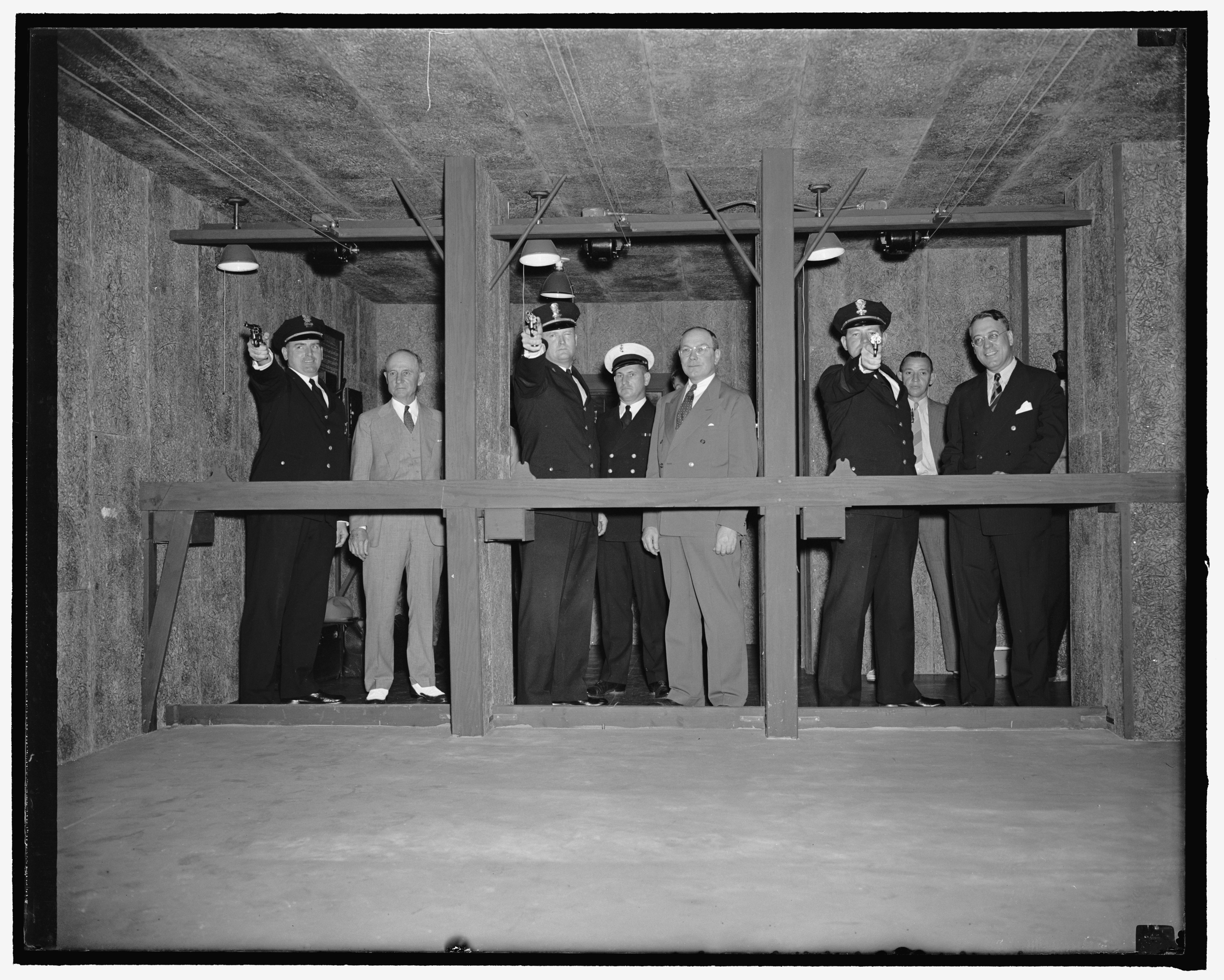
A Treasury Police target range in the sub-basement of the Treasury Building installed in 1940.

In 1879, guards were appointed to safeguard the coins, currency and documents of the US Treasury and fell under the office of the Chief Clerk of the Treasury department. They were later renamed as the Treasury Guard Force. On 1 July 1937, the secretary of the treasury placed the TGF along with the Guard Force of the Bureau of Engraving and Printing, under the authority of the United States Secret Service where they became the Uniformed Force of the Secret Service.

On 1 July 1953, the Uniformed Force was again split in half and one half again became the Guard Force of the Bureau of Engraving and Printing.

After 1960, when the USSS moved out of the main treasury building the TGF became responsible for arresting and interviewing check and bond forgers and performing on-site investigations into thefts, threats, violence, and deal with mentally ill persons on Treasury property.

In 1970, the TGF became the Treasury Security Force and in 1976 the Guards became Police officers after a ruling by the United States Civil Service Commission. In 1983 the TPF became the Treasury Police Force and in 1986 merged with the Uniformed Division of the Secret Service.

== Organization ==
Headed by a chief of police, the TPF was a relatively small force which operated in three shifts each headed by a lieutenant. The Nightwatch administrator, the Pass and Reception Sergeant, and the training lieutenant reported directly to the chief.

== See also ==
- Bureau of Engraving and Printing Police
- United States Mint Police
- Federal Police

== Bibliography ==
- Donald A. Torres (1985). Handbook of Federal Police and Investigative Agencies. Greenwood Press. ISBN 0-313-24578-9 and ISBN 978-0-313-24578-7
