= Bureau of Engraving and Printing =

United States government agency

- Seal of the Bureau of Engraving and Printing

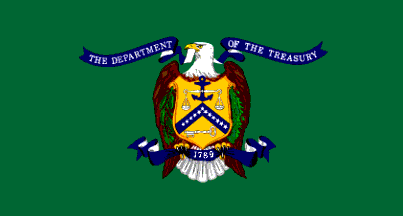
- Flag of the U.S. Department of the Treasury

Agency overview
- Formed: August 29, 1862; 164 years ago
- Headquarters: 300 14th St SW Washington, D.C., U.S.
- Employees: 2,169 (2006)
- Agency executive: Michael Brown, Acting Director of the Bureau of Engraving and Printing
- Parent agency: Department of the Treasury
- Website: bep.gov

The Bureau of Engraving and Printing (BEP) is a government agency within the United States Department of the Treasury that designs and produces a variety of security products for the United States government, most notable of which is Federal Reserve Notes (paper money) for the Federal Reserve, the nation's central bank. In addition to paper currency, the BEP produces Treasury securities; military commissions and award certificates; invitations and admission cards; and many different types of identification cards, forms, and other special security documents for a variety of government agencies. The BEP's role as printer of paper currency makes it one of two Treasury Department agencies involved in currency production. The other is the United States Mint, which mints coinage. With production facilities in Washington, D.C., and Fort Worth, Texas, the Bureau of Engraving and Printing is the largest producer of government security documents in the United States.

== History ==
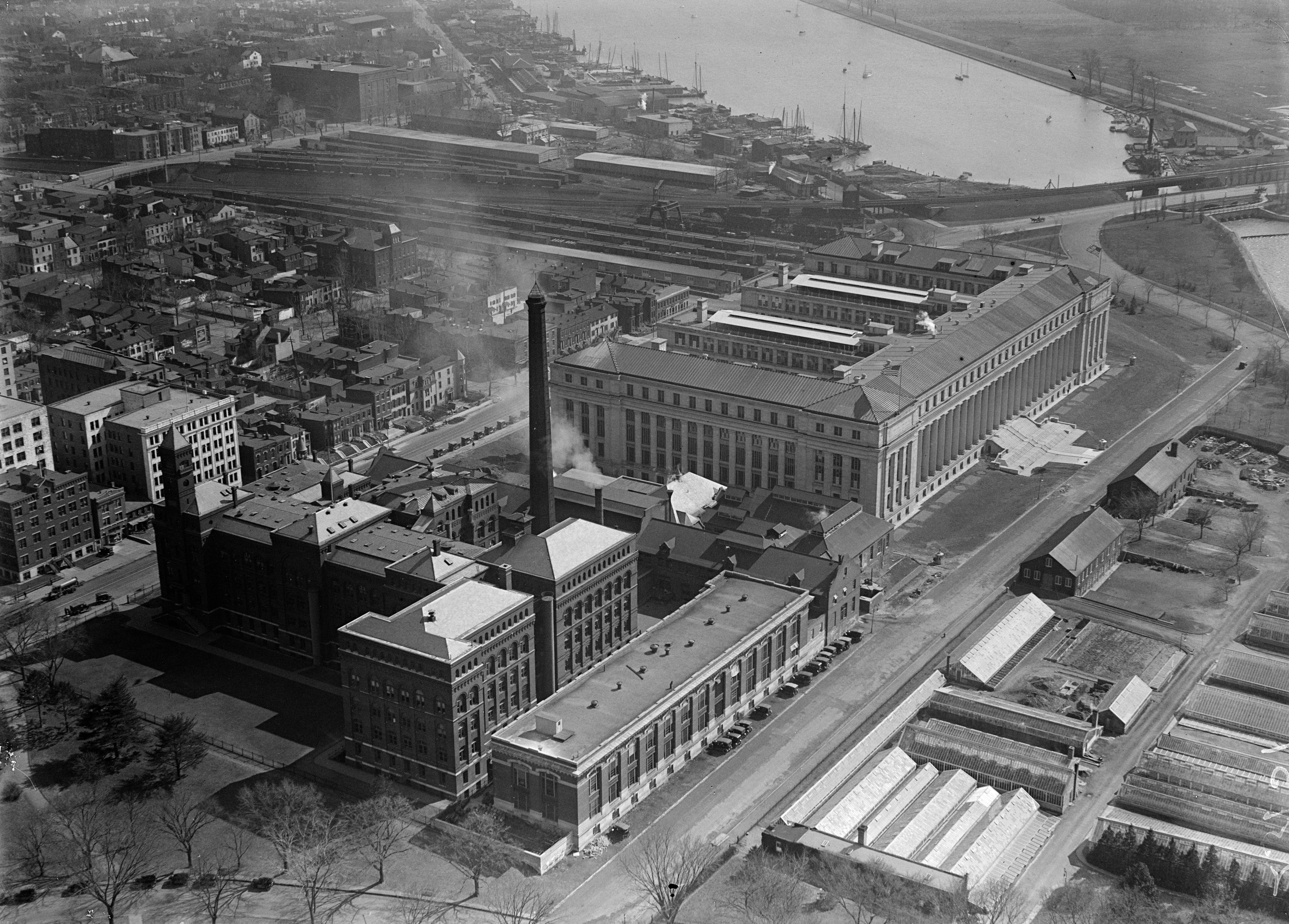
Aerial view of the BEP in Washington, D.C., c. 1918

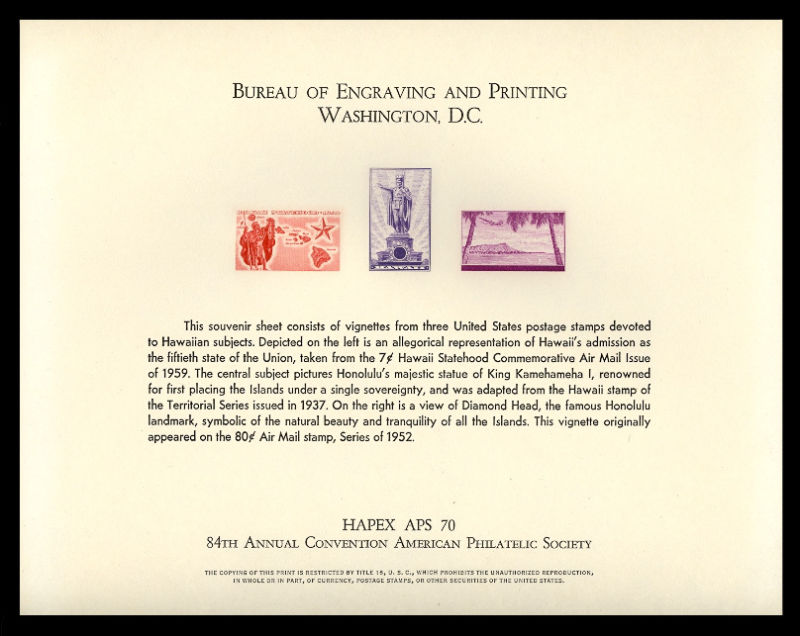
United States Souvenir Card issued by the Bureau of Engraving and Printing, for the HAPEX APS 70 exhibition and 84th Annual Convention of the American Philatelic Society in 1970

The Bureau of Engraving and Printing has its origins in legislation enacted to help fund the Civil War. In July 1861, Congress authorized the secretary of the treasury to issue paper currency in lieu of coins due to the lack of funds needed to support the conflict. The paper notes were essentially government IOUs and were called Demand Notes because they were payable "on demand" in coin at certain Treasury facilities. At this time the government had no facility for the production of paper money so the American Bank Note Company and National Bank Note Company produced the Demand Notes in sheets of four. These sheets were then sent to the Treasury Department where dozens of clerks signed the notes and scores of workers cut the sheets and trimmed the notes by hand. The Second Legal Tender Act (July 11, 1862; 12 Stat. 532) authorized the Treasury Secretary to engrave and print notes at the Treasury Department; the design of which incorporates fine-line engraving, intricate geometric lathe work patterns, a Treasury seal, and engraved signatures to aid in counterfeit deterrence.

Initially, the currency processing operations in the Treasury were not formally organized. When Congress created the Office of Comptroller of the Currency and National Currency Bureau in 1863, currency-processing operations were nominally subordinated to that agency and designated the "First Division, National Currency Bureau". For years, however, the currency operations were known by various semi-official labels, such as the "Printing Bureau", "Small Note Bureau", "Currency Department", and "Small Note Room". It was not until 1874 that the "Bureau of Engraving and Printing" was officially recognized in congressional legislation with a specific allocation of operating funds for the fiscal year of 1875.

From almost the very beginning of its operations, the Bureau of Engraving and Printing designed and printed a variety of products in addition to currency. As early as 1864, the offices which would later become the BEP made passports for the State Department and money orders for the Post Office Department. Passports are now produced by the Government Publishing Office. Other early items produced by the BEP included various government debt instruments, such as interest-bearing notes, refunding certificates, compound interest Treasury notes, and bonds. The production of postage stamps began in 1894, and for almost the next century the BEP was the sole producer of postage stamps in the country.

The BEP in Washington, D.C.

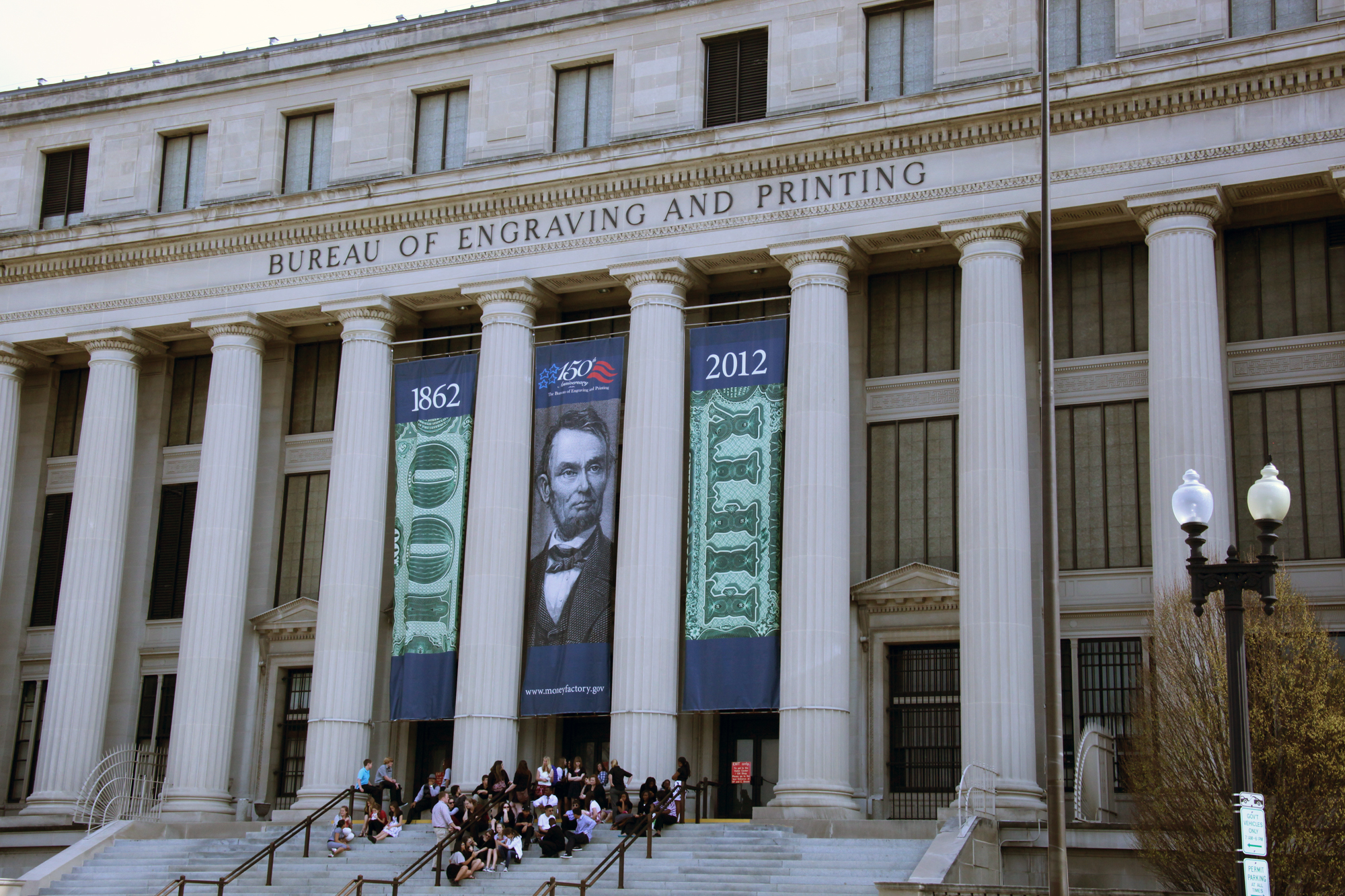
15th Street SW entrance to the BEP in Washington, D.C.

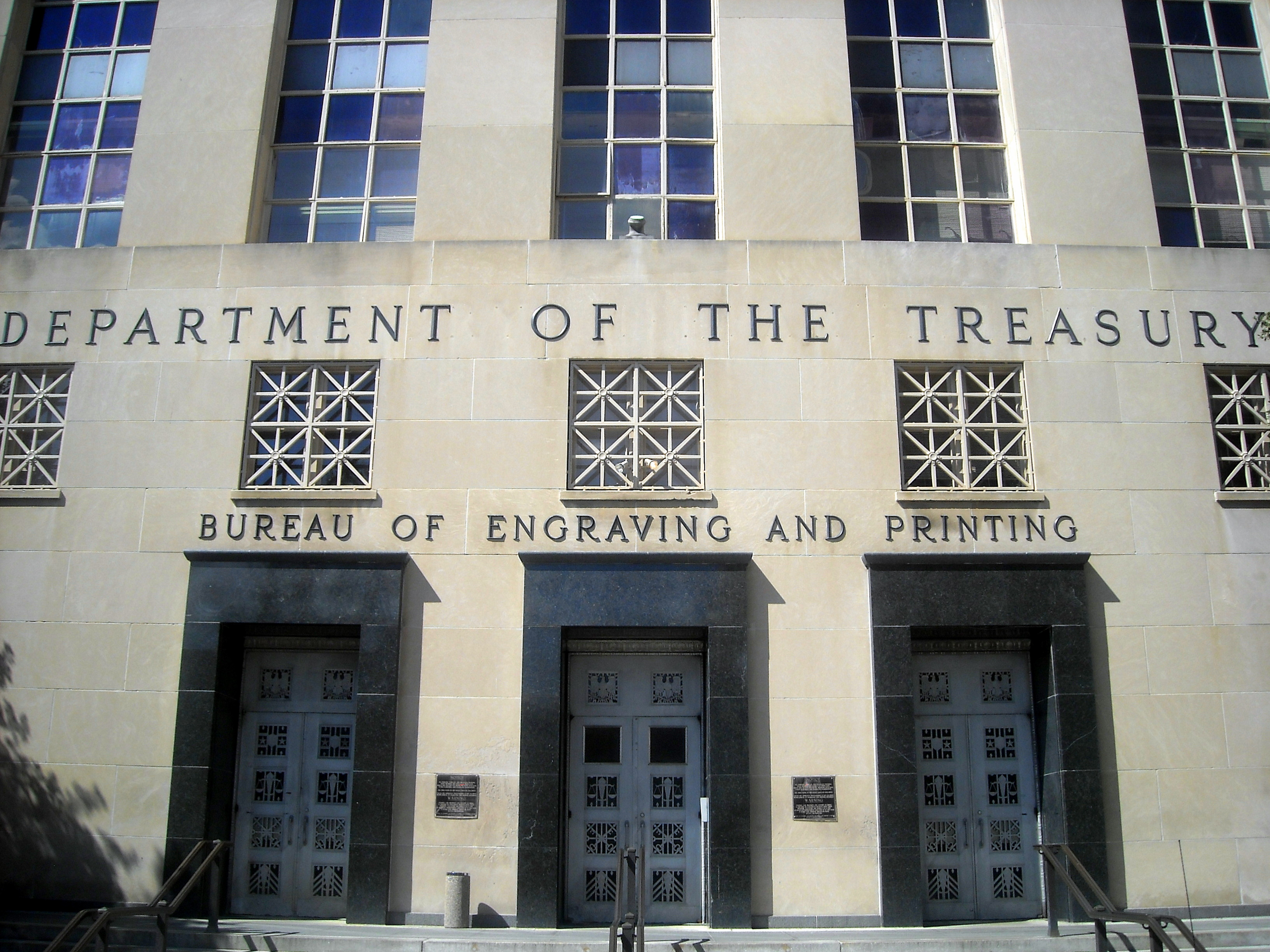
13th Street SW entrance to the BEP Annex in Washington, D.C.

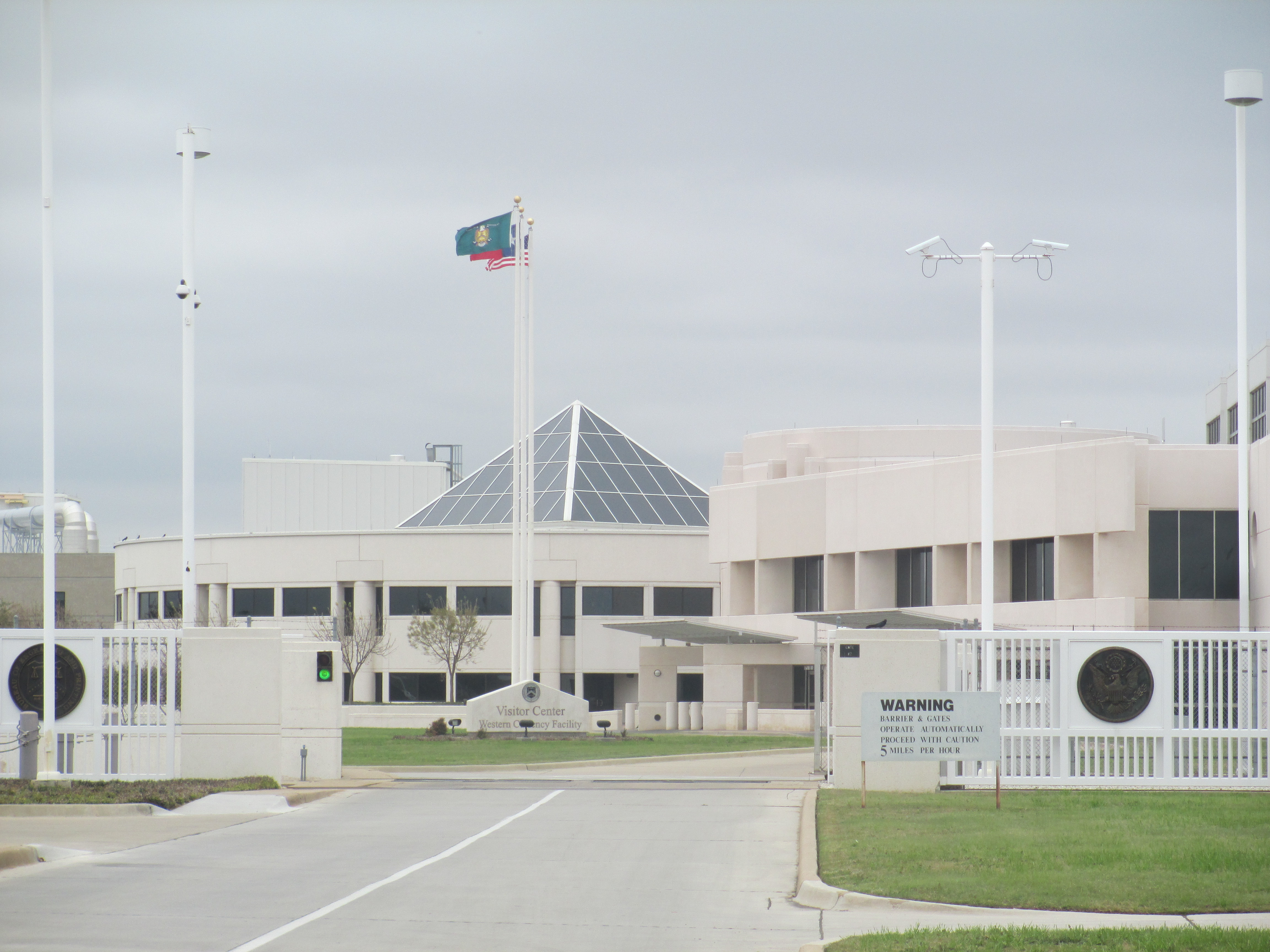
The Bureau's Fort Worth location, with visitor tours available during business hours

== Production ==
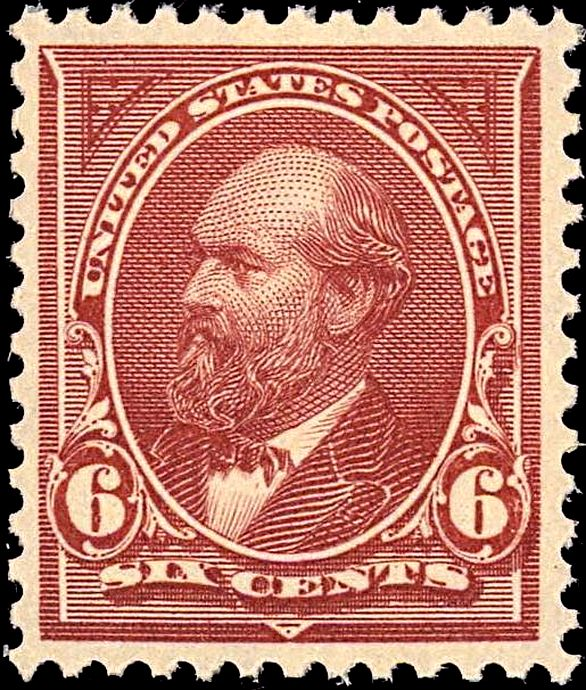
Garfield, Issue of 1894 1st postage stamp printed by BEP

=== Postage stamp production ===
The Bureau of Engraving and Printing officially took over production of postage stamps for the United States government in July 1894. The first of the works printed by the BEP was placed on sale on July 18, 1894, and by the end of the first year of stamp production, the BEP had printed and delivered more than 2.1 billion stamps. The United States Postal Service switched purely to private postage stamp printers in 2005, ending 111 years of production by the Bureau. Starting in 2011 the United States Postal Service in-housed all postage stamp printing services.

=== Currency production ===
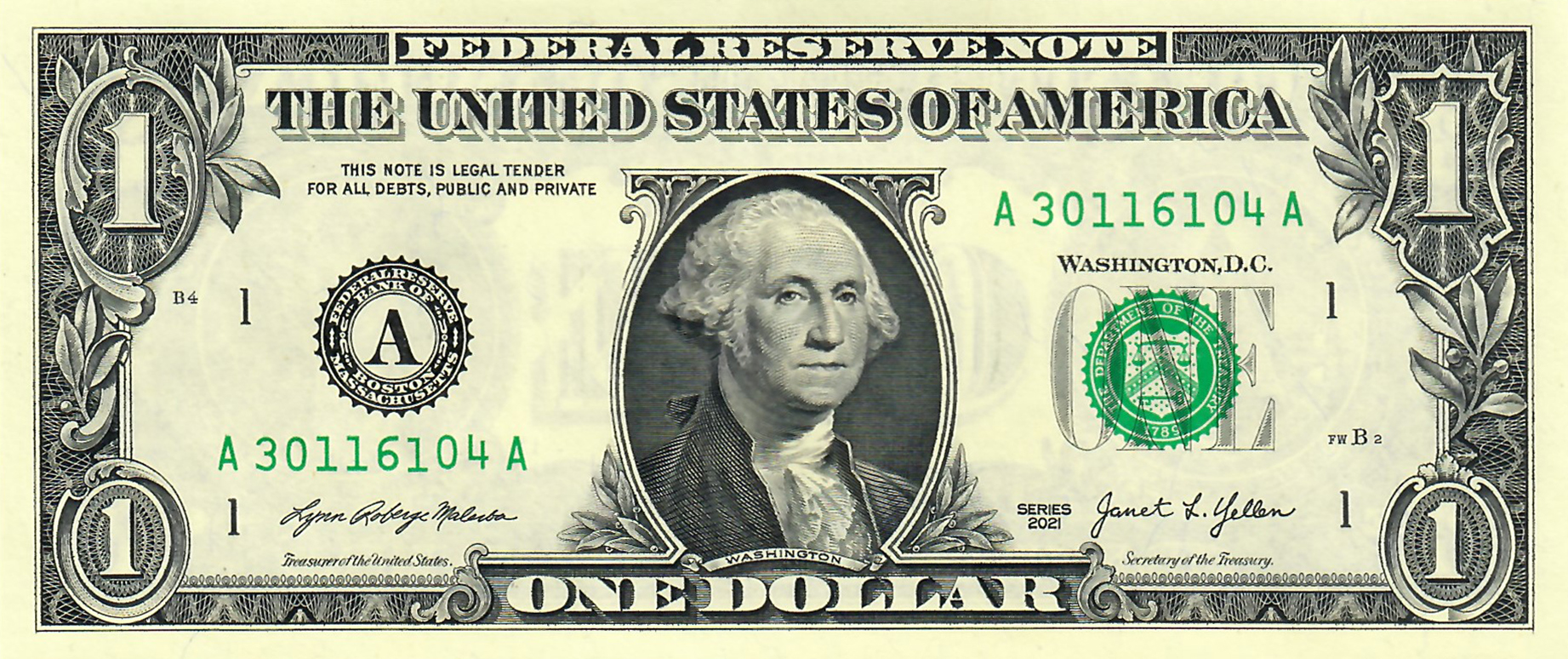
Federal Reserve $1 note, 2021 issue

Plate capacity on power presses increased from four to eight notes per sheet in 1918 in order to meet the greatly expanded production requirements related to World War I.

With the redesign of currency in 1929, the first major change since paper currency was first issued in 1861, note design was not only standardized but note size was also significantly reduced. Due to this reduction in size, the Bureau was able to convert from eight-note printing plates to twelve-note plates. The redesign effort came about for several reasons, chief among them a reduction in paper costs and improved counterfeit deterrence through better public recognition of currency features.

A further increase in the number of notes per sheet was realized in 1952 after breakthrough developments in the production of non-offset inks. Beginning in 1943, the BEP experimented with new inks that dried faster, therefore obviating the need to place tissues between sheets to prevent ink from offsetting to other sheets. The faster drying ink also enabled printed sheets of backs to be kept damp until the faces were printed, thereby reducing distortion caused by wetting, drying, and re-wetting of the paper (sheets needed to be dampened before each printing).

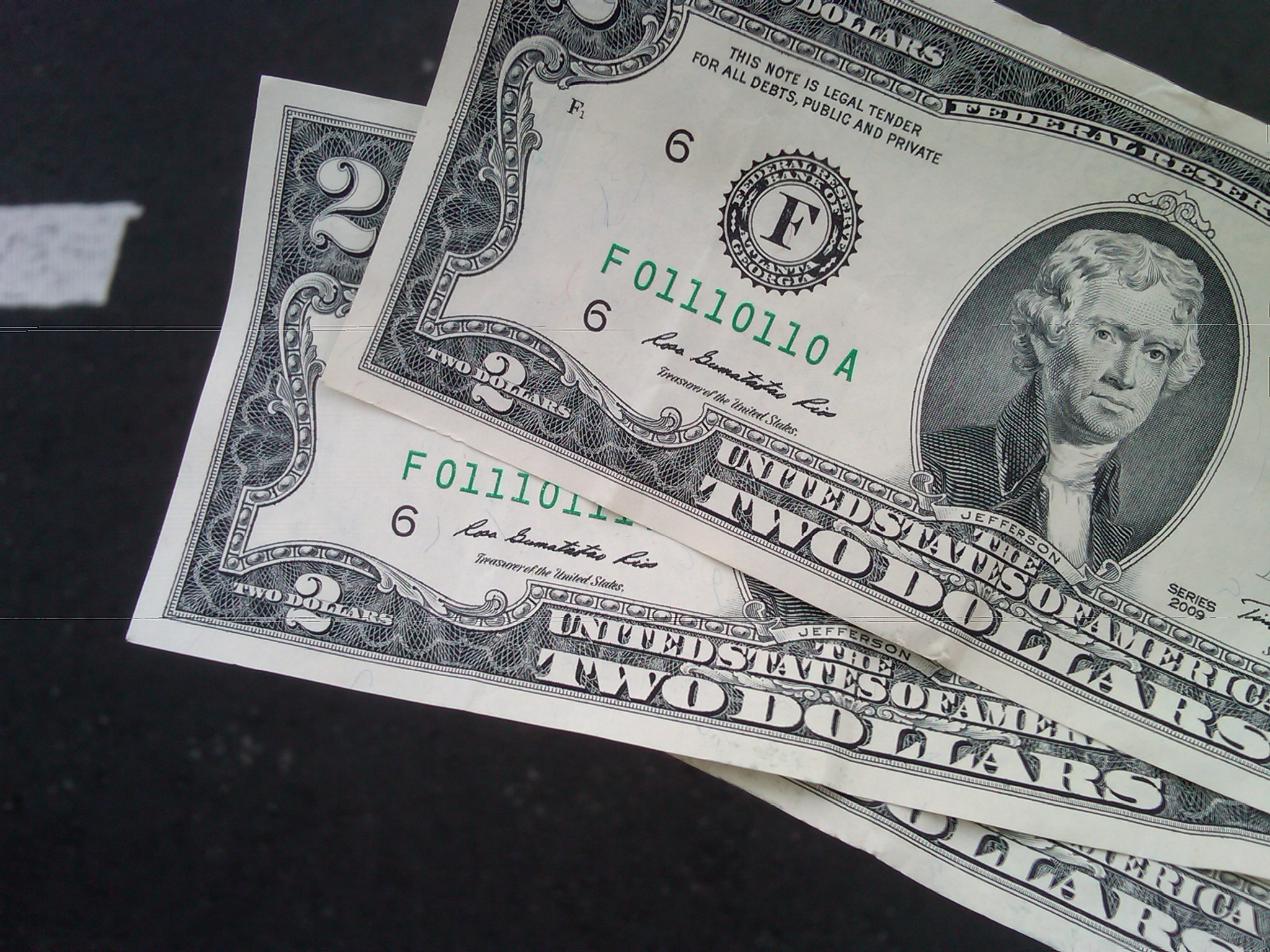
Three consecutive $2 notes, 2009 issue

By reducing the distortion that increases proportionally with the size of the sheet of paper, the Bureau was able to convert from 12-note printing plates to plates capable of printing 18 notes in 1952. Five years later in 1957, the Bureau began printing currency via the dry intaglio method that utilizes special paper and non-offset inks, enabling a further increase from 18 to 32 notes per sheet. Since 1968, all currency has been printed by means of the dry intaglio process, whereby wetting of the paper prior to printing is unnecessary. In this process, fine-line engravings are transferred to steel plates from which an impression is made on sheets of distinctive paper. Ink is applied to a plate containing 32 note impressions, which is then wiped clean, leaving ink in the engraved lines. The plate is pressed against the sheet of paper with such pressure as to actually press the paper into the lines of the plate to pick up the ink. Both faces and backs are printed in this manner – backs first. After the faces are printed, the sheets are then typographically overprinted with Treasury Seals and serial numbers.

During Fiscal Year 2013, the Bureau delivered 6.6 billion notes at an average cost of 10 cents per note.

== Locations ==
The Bureau of Engraving and Printing has two locations: one in Washington, D.C., and another in Fort Worth, Texas.

=== District of Columbia location ===
The Washington facility consists of two adjacent buildings. The elder, considered the main building and located between 14th and 15th streets SW, was constructed in 1914. The architectural style of the main building is neoclassical. It has a steel superstructure with fireproof concrete, Indiana limestone, and granite trim exterior. The main façade of the building faces Raoul Wallenberg Place (15th St), the Tidal Basin, and the Jefferson Memorial, with stone columns spanning the 505-foot (154 m) length of the building's front. The building is 296 feet (90 m) deep and 105 feet (32 m) high with four wings that extend back toward 14th Street. The building is listed on the U.S. National Register of Historic Places as Auditor's Building Complex.

In May 1938, work was completed on an addition to the Washington, D.C., facility to accommodate increases in personnel and production. The annex building, as it is called, is located on 14th Street, between C and D streets SW, just opposite the main building. The building is 570 feet (170 m) long, 285 feet (87 m) wide, and made entirely of reinforced concrete with a limestone façade. The structure consists of a central backbone running from 14th Street to 13th Street with five wings extending north and south from the backbone.

The Washington, D.C., location offers a free 30-minute guided tour which features the various phases of currency production. Tours may be taken Monday through Friday. The Bureau is closed for all federal holidays and the week between Christmas and New Year's Day.

=== Fort Worth location ===
In 1987, construction began on a second facility in Fort Worth, Texas. In addition to meeting increased production requirements, a western location was seen to serve as a contingency operation in case of emergencies in the DC metropolitan area; additionally, costs for transporting currency to Federal Reserve banks in San Francisco, Dallas, and Kansas City would be reduced. Currency production began in December 1990 at the Fort Worth facility, and the official dedication took place on April 26, 1991. Any currency printed at Fort Worth includes a small "FW", usually located to the left of the bill's face plate number, and most also have larger back plate numbers.

=== Historic locations ===
The Bureau moved into its own building in 1880 with the completion of a facility at 14th St. and Independence Ave. SW, now the Sidney Yates Building. An addition was built on the south side of the building in 1891. The Bureau relocated to its present Washington location, just south of the original building, in 1914.

=== Future locations ===
On April 27, 2022, Maryland Governor Larry Hogan announced that the BEP would move from its historic Washington, D.C. location to Beltsville, Maryland, at the U.S. Department of Agriculture's Beltsville Agricultural Research Center (BARC). The U.S. Department of Treasury was transferred ownership of 114 acres within BARC from the Department of Agriculture for a future facility estimated to be completed in early 2027.

== BEP Police ==
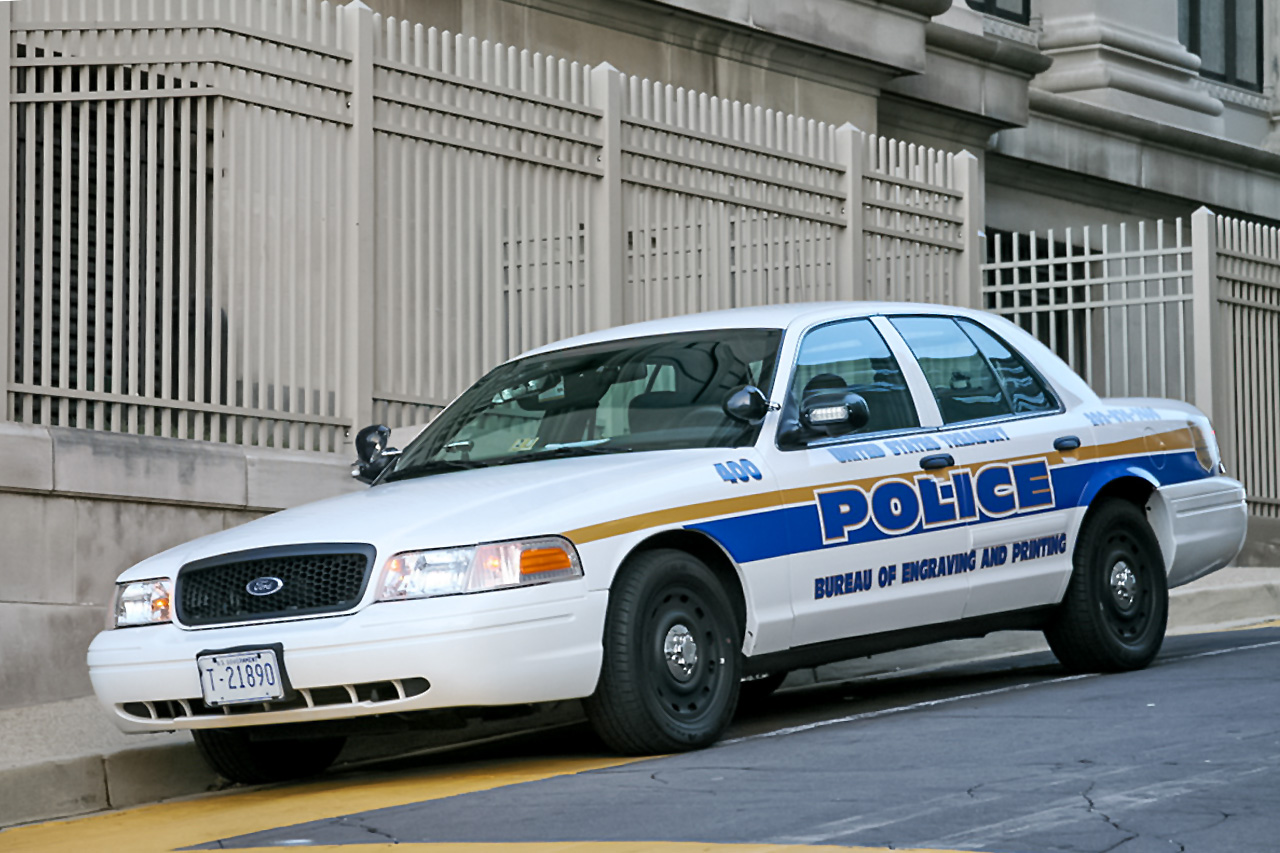
A Bureau of Engraving and Printing Police (BEP) patrol car in 2008

The Bureau operates a police department, the Bureau of Engraving and Printing Police Force, that protects BEP personnel and facilities.

=== Responsibilities ===
The BEP Police are responsible for enforcing federal and local laws, Treasury Department rules and regulations, Washington, DC Criminal Code through a Memorandum of Understanding, and Texas Criminal Code.

=== Officer numbers ===
In 2004, the agency employed 234 police officers. By 2020, this number dropped to 187.

== U.S. Currency Reader Program ==
To assist visually impaired U.S. citizens and national residents, the BEP operates a U.S. Currency Reader Program providing free 'iBill currency readers' – a small battery-powered device which reads aloud the denomination of the inserted bill.

== See also ==
- US Treasury specimen book
- Charles R. Chickering, chief stamp designer for BEP
- Federal Reserve System
- Title 31 of the Code of Federal Regulations
- United States Mint Police
- United States Treasury Police
- Who's Minding the Mint?, a 1967 film with the D.C. Bureau of Engraving and Printing as its setting
