= US Treasury specimen book =

Banknote engraving albums

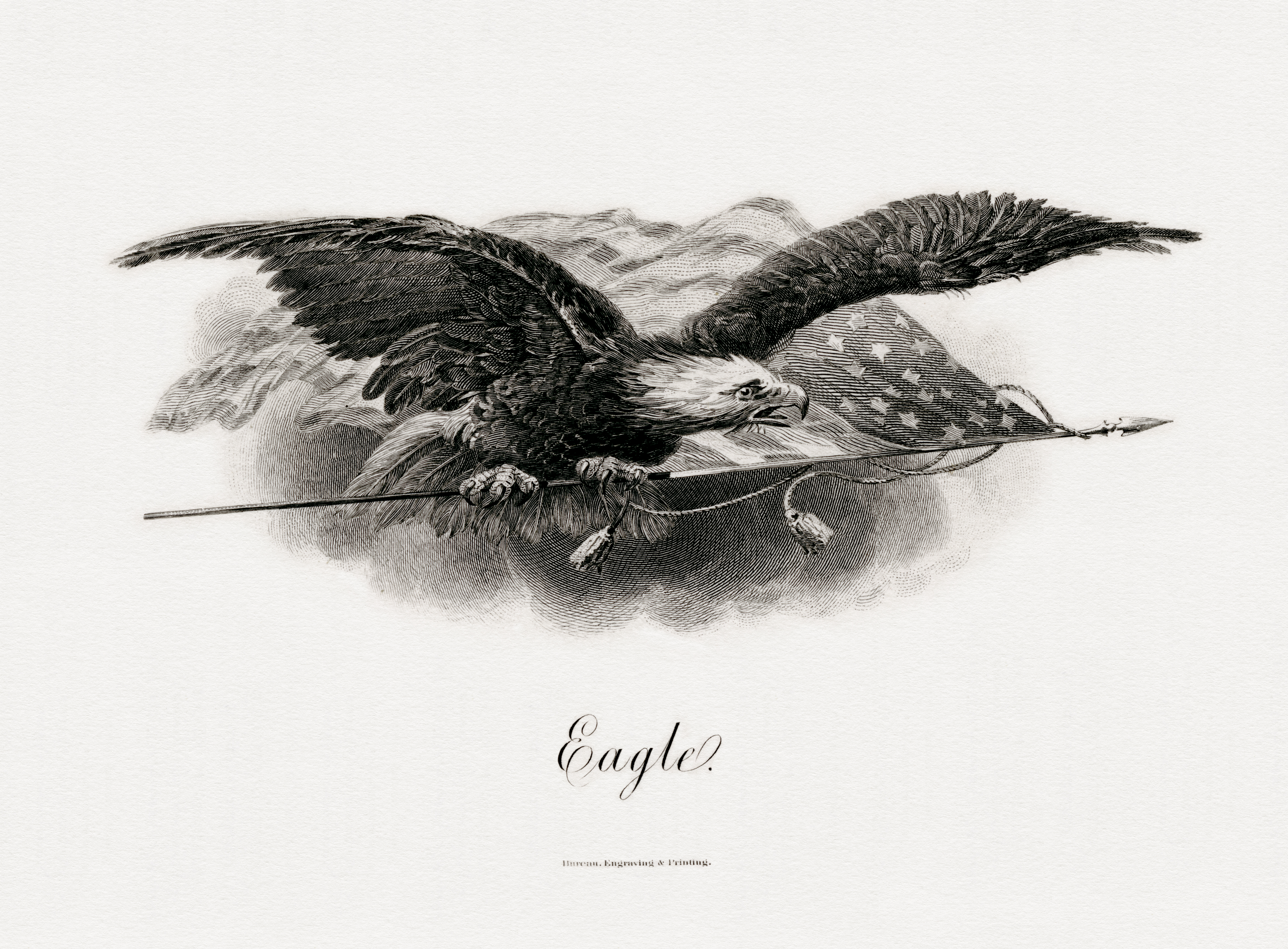
Engraved eagle (with flag)

US Treasury Department Specimen books, also known as BEP presentation albums, were published by the Bureau of Engraving and Printing (BEP) from the mid-1860s through the 1910s. Prepared upon request of the United States Secretary of the Treasury, albums were generally presented to Cabinet members, select Members of Congress, diplomats and visiting dignitaries. Some extant albums still in their original binding bear the name of the recipient impressed in gold lettering on the cover. While no two presentation albums have exactly the same contents, each book usually contained portraits, vignettes, and/or images of buildings. Specimen books which contain whole proof images of currency are extremely rare.

== Banknote engraving specimen books ==
The function of specimen books or presentation albums initially served as a business-generating artist's portfolio to be given to bank presidents or heads of foreign national banks. Prior to specimen books, engraving company salesmen presented potential clients with engraved broadsides highlighting their abilities. Examples of these salesman's sample sheets exist from the mid-1820s and 1830s. While specimen books were introduced in 1850s and 1860s, examples of the salesman sheet are known through the 1880s.

== Bureau of Engraving and Printing (US Treasury) specimen books ==
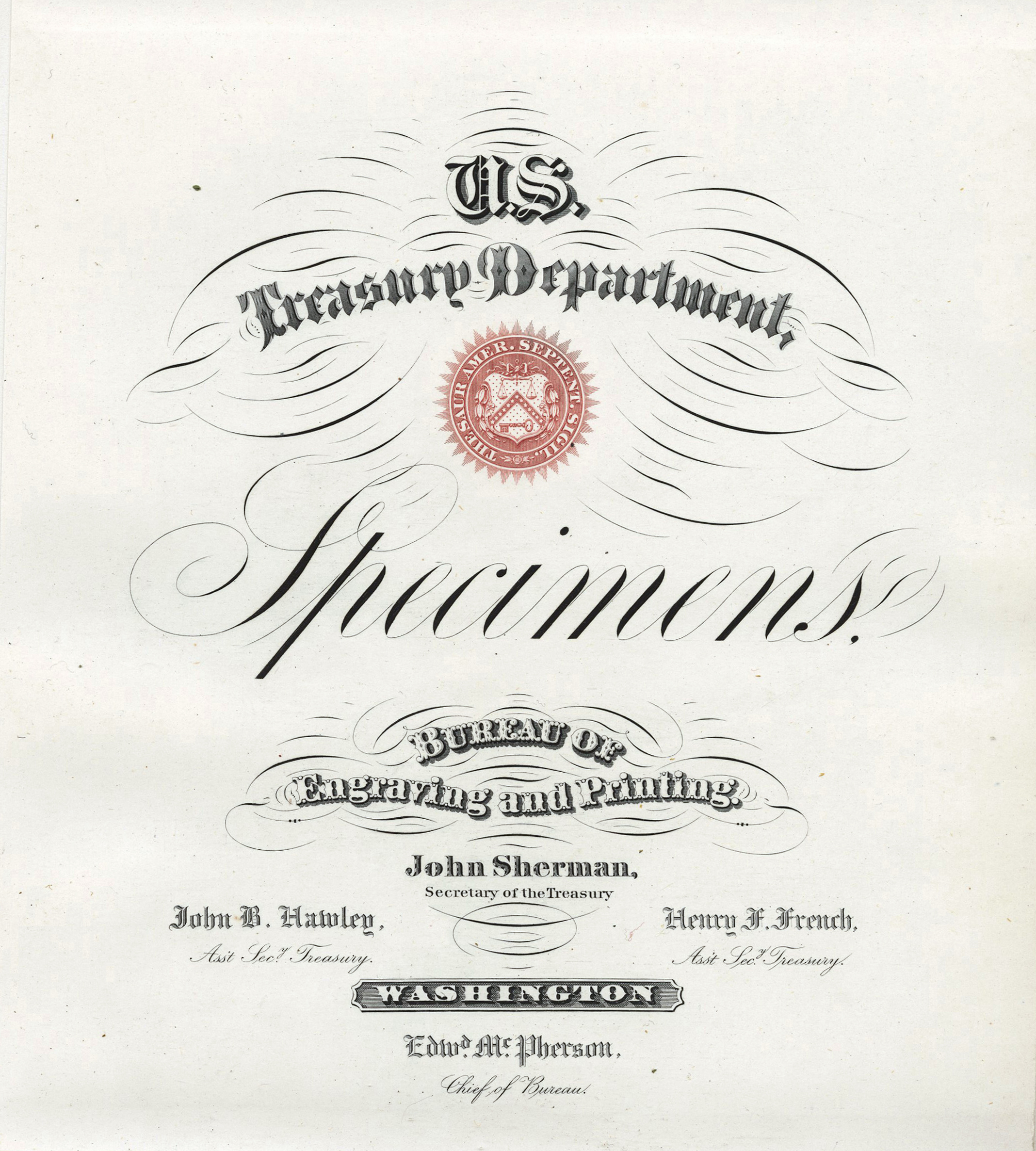
BEP-US Treasury Department Specimens (c. 1881), standard title page

Literature on US Treasury Department specimen books is very scarce. An auction record from 1891 described a BEP specimen book with 103 engravings ("46 portraits and 57 vignettes") as either coming from the collection of Rev. Henry Ward Beecher, or having been presented to him. A 1921 auction catalog documents the offering of a BEP specimen book which contained about 145 engravings ("about 100 portraits and 45 plates and views"). In 2001 the numismatic community knew of 47 BEP specimen books and suspected the existence of 10 to 15 more.

A WorldCat search of library records found eight BEP specimen books. Based on available information for five books, they range in size (i.e., number of engraved illustrations) from roughly 125 to 145 engravings. One library record noted a presentation inscription to James B. Beck.

Between 2005 and mid-2014 available records indicate at least 18 BEP specimen presentation albums have sold in public auction. (Note: Auction records from 2005 to the present (27 September 2014) indicate 18 presentation albums sold across roughly 10 sales) Albums vary in length from a single volume of 24 portraits to a four volume set containing roughly 400 engraved images. The content of each album varies and may contain one or more of the following: portraits of presidents, cabinet members, founding fathers, government officials, and Civil War generals; vignettes and allegories found on various issues of US paper currency and other government securities; and engravings of significant and historical architectural structures. The interior of a BEP presentation album is generally described as containing "intaglio die proof vignette pulls on thick gilt edged cards, each with intervening integral tissue guards for protection". The illustrations below come from a single two-volume presentation album reportedly given to Treasury Secretary Lyman Gage.

United States banknotes issued from 1861 to the present depict 53 people (Note: This list does not include US Fractional currency.) including presidents, cabinet members, Founding Fathers, jurists, military leaders and members of congress. Thirteen presidents (Note: Washington, Jefferson, Madison, Monroe, John Q. Adams, Jackson, Lincoln, Grant, Garfield, Cleveland, Benjamin Harrison, McKinley, and Wilson) and 12 treasury secretaries (Note: Hamilton, Dexter, Gallatin, Crawford, Walker, Meredith, Chase, Fessenden, McCulloch, Sherman, Windom, and Manning.) have been depicted on US banknotes. Some have appeared on bonds. (Note: Johnson and Taylor) Many presidents had more than one official engraving. A side-by-side comparison of these engraved portraits and the notes on which they appeared can be seen at Art and engraving on United States banknotes.

Sample engravings
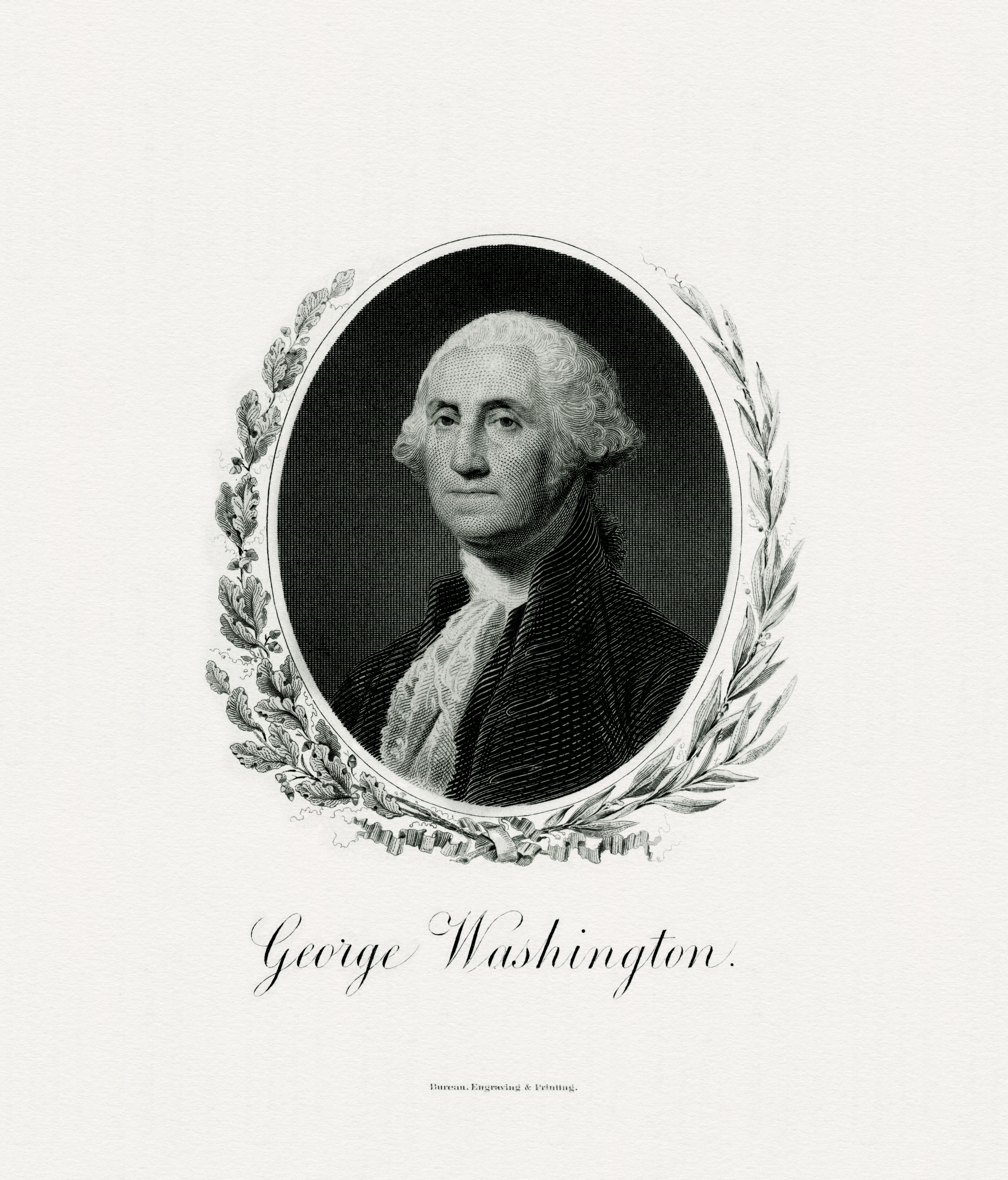
George Washington
President 1789–97

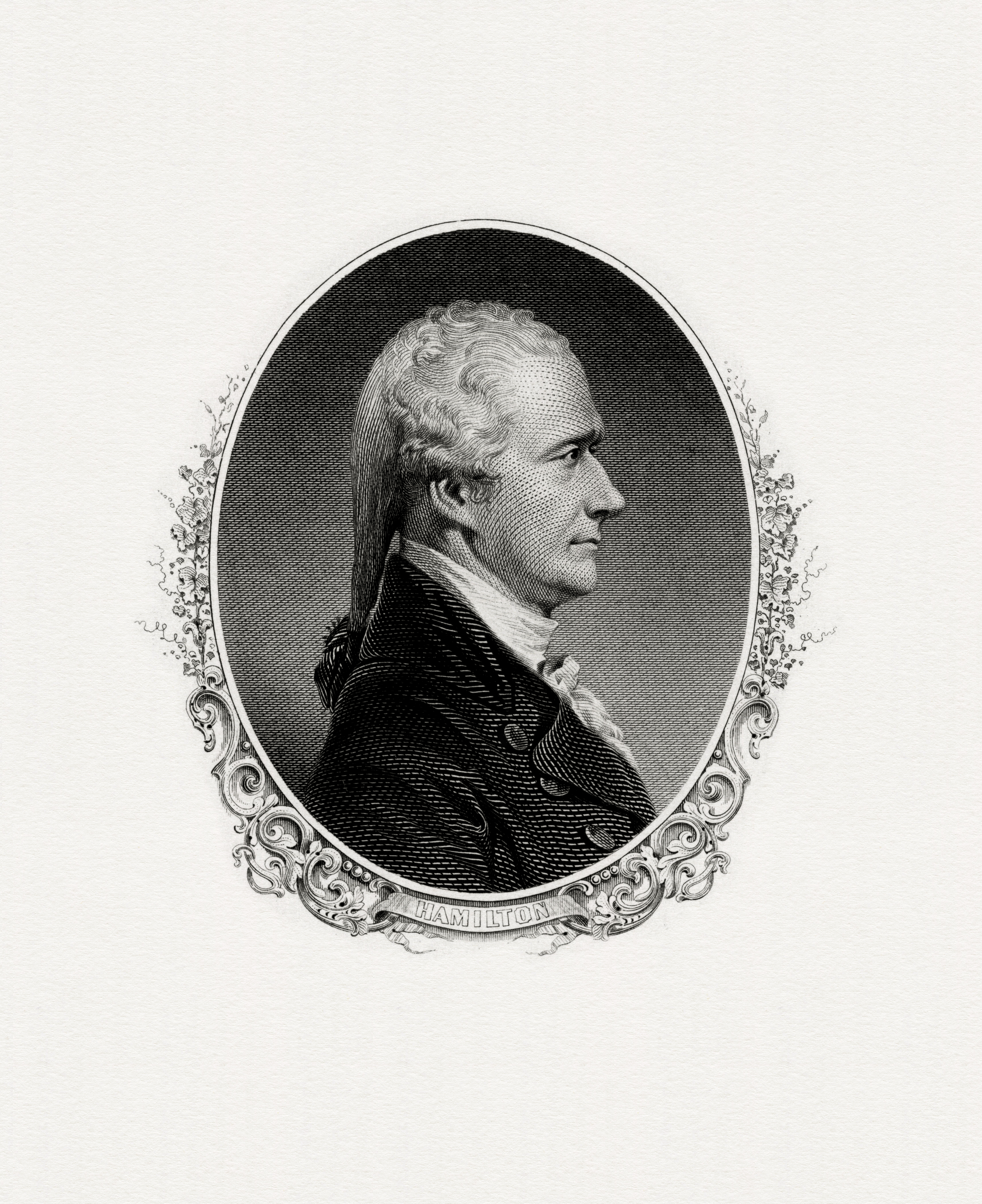
Alexander Hamilton
Secretary of the Treasury 1789–95

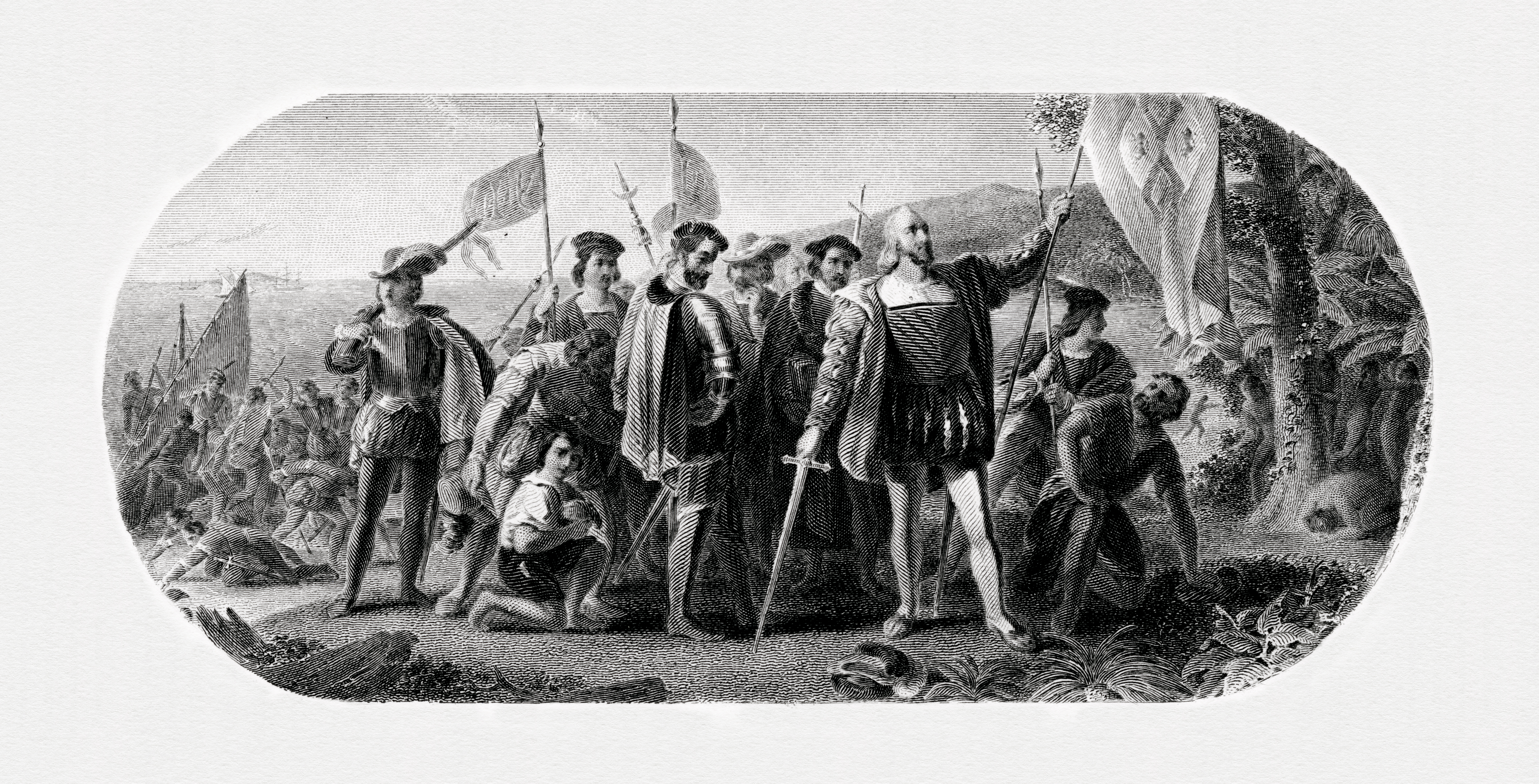
Landing of Columbus
Continental Bank Note Co.

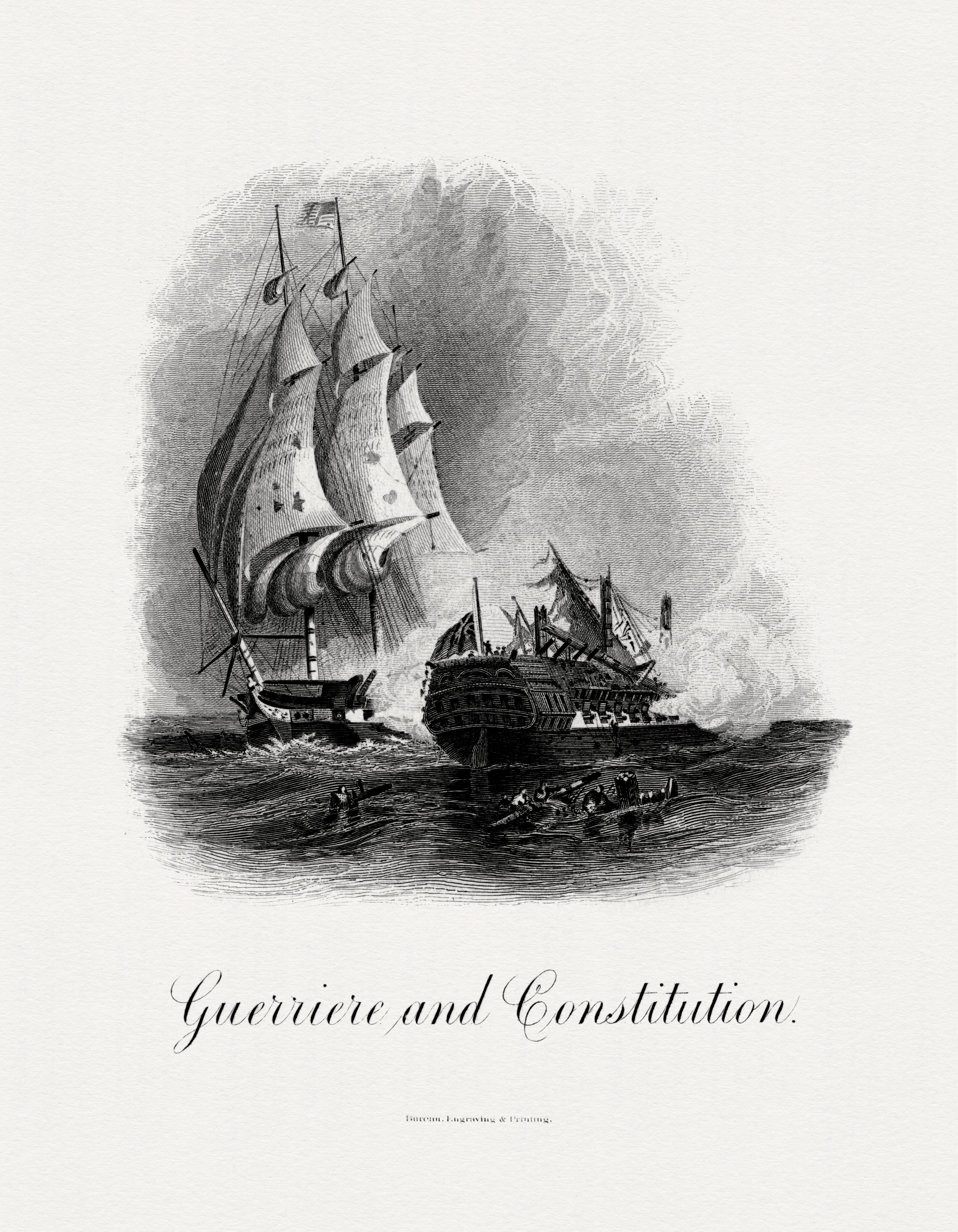
Guerriere and Constitution

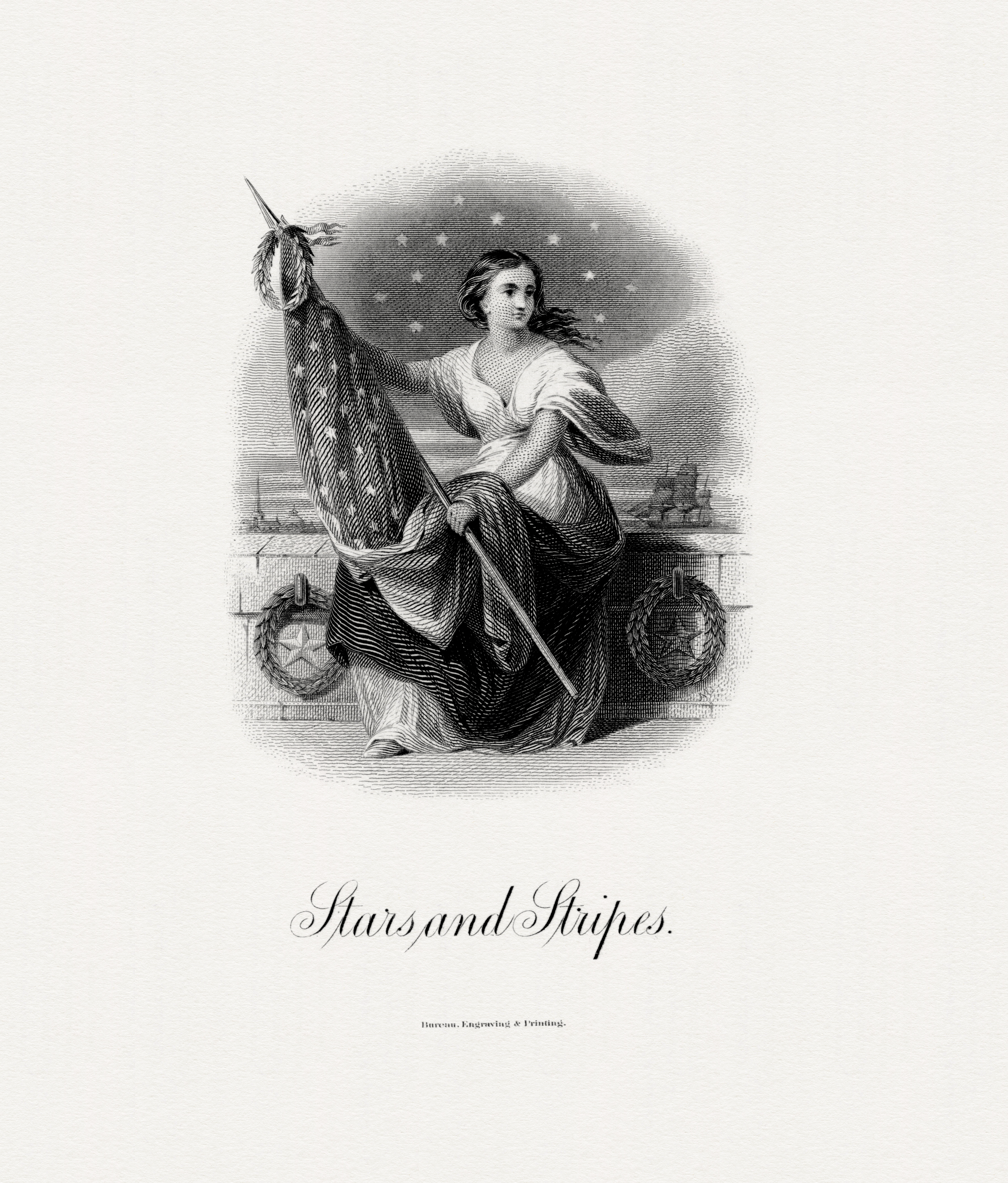
Stars and Stripes
Louis Delnoce
