= Statue of Albert Gallatin =

Statue by James Earle Fraser in Washington, D.C., U.S.

Albert Gallatin
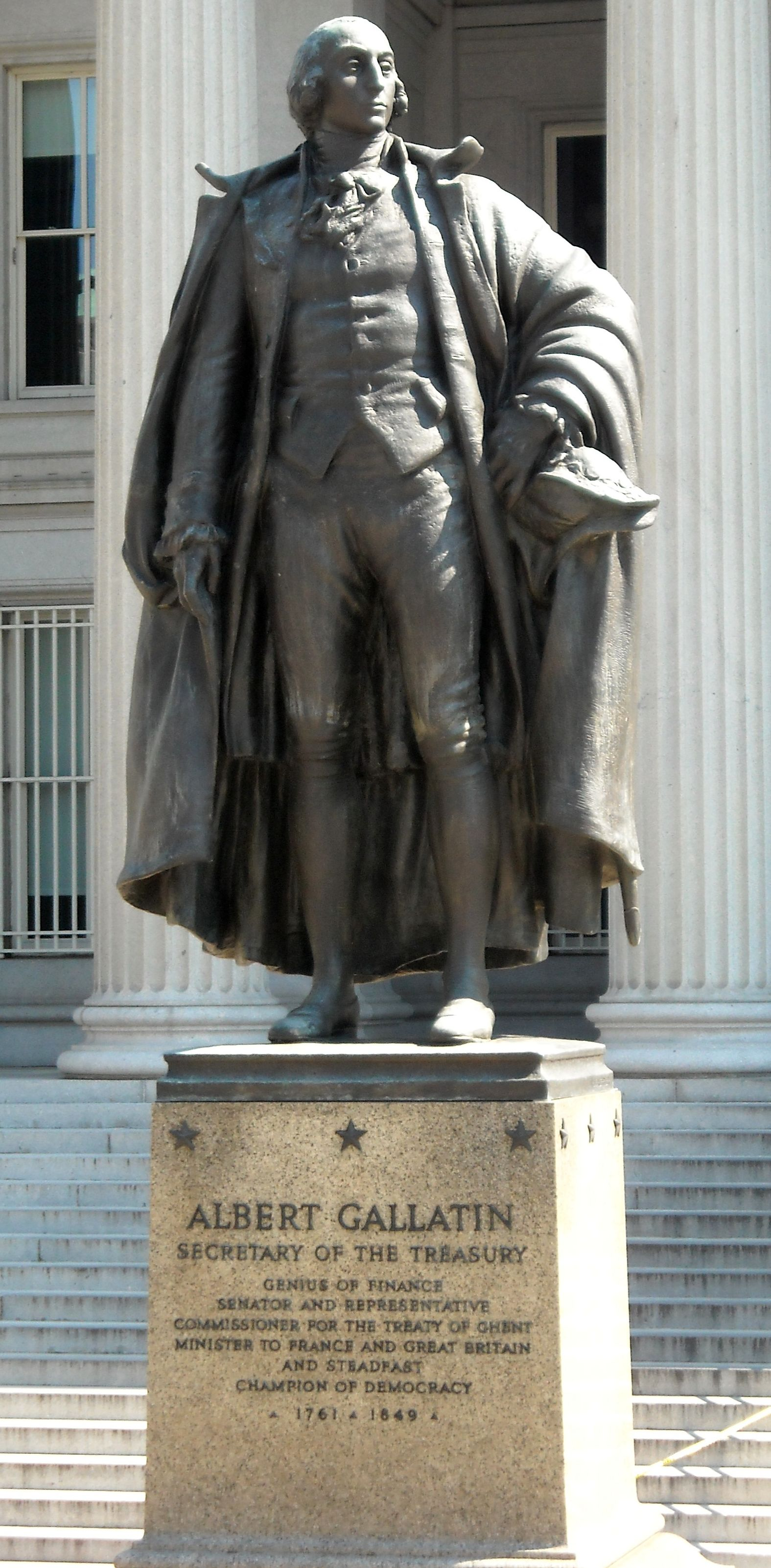
- Artist: James Earle Fraser
- Year: Completed 1941; Dedicated 1947
- Type: Bronze
- Location: Washington, D.C., U.S.; 38°53′54″N 77°02′04″W

Albert Gallatin is a bronze statue by James Earle Fraser. It commemorates Albert Gallatin, who founded New York University and served as United States Secretary of the Treasury.

It is located north of the Treasury Building (Washington, D.C.), at 15th Street and Pennsylvania Avenue, N.W. Washington, D.C. It was authorized by Congress on January 11, 1927. It was dedicated on October 15, 1947.

The inscription reads: (Base, front:)

ALBERT GALLATIN
SECRETARY OF THE TREASURY
GENIUS OF FINANCE
SENATOR AND REPRESENTATIVE
COMMISSIONER FOR THE TREATY OF GHENT
MINISTER TO FRANCE AND GREAT BRITAIN
AND STEADFAST
CHAMPION OF DEMOCRACY
1761–1849

== See also ==
- List of memorials to Albert Gallatin
- List of public art in Washington, D.C., Ward 2
