= Albert Gallatin Memorial Bridge =

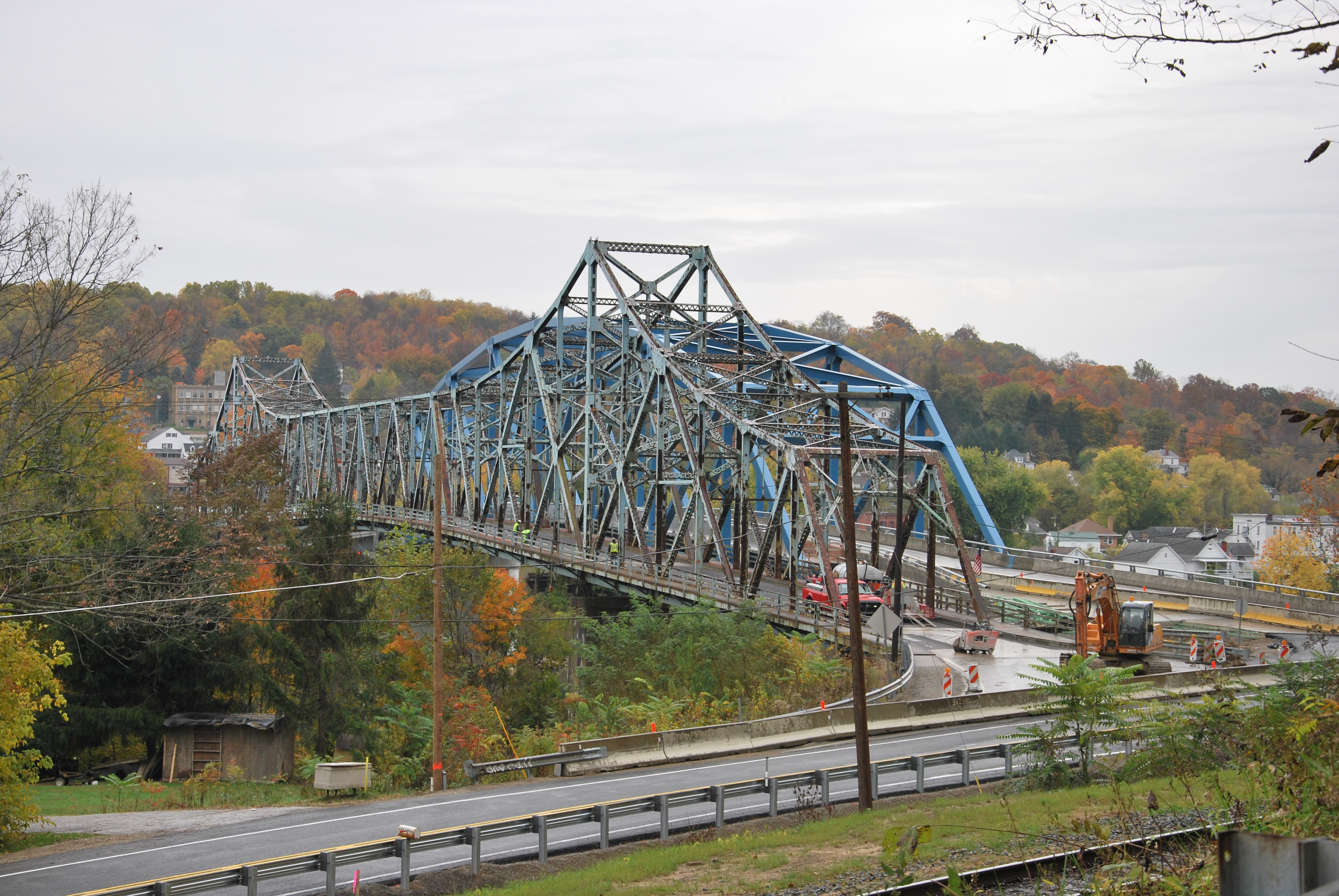
- 1930 bridge (left) the day after its closing, with its replacement on the right.
- Coordinates: 39°44′21″N 79°54′12″W
- Carries: PA 88
- Crosses: Monongahela River
- Named for: Albert Gallatin
- Maintained by: PennDOT

Characteristics
- Total length: 810 ft (250 m)
- Width: 28 ft (8.5 m)

History
- Constructed by: Point Marion Bridge Company
- Marion Bridge
- U.S. National Register of Historic Places
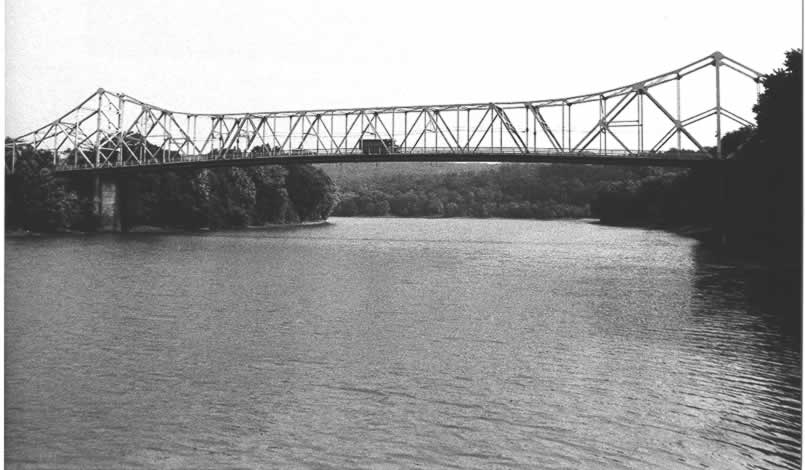
- Side of the bridge
- Location: Pennsylvania Route 88 over the Monongahela River, Point Marion, Pennsylvania
- Area: less than one acre
- Built: 1930
- Architectural style: Cantilever through truss
- MPS: Highway Bridges Owned by the Commonwealth of Pennsylvania, Department of Transportation TR
- NRHP reference No.: 88000841
- Added to NRHP: June 22, 1988

Location
- Interactive map of Albert Gallatin Memorial Bridge

The Albert Gallatin Memorial Bridge (also known as the Point Marion Bridge) was a cantilever truss bridge that carried vehicular traffic across the Monongahela River in the southwestern part of the U.S. state of Pennsylvania. Built in 1930 to replace a ferry, it connected Point Marion in Fayette County and Dunkard Township in Greene County. It was named in honor of U.S. Senator and longtime U.S. Treasury Secretary and diplomat Albert Gallatin, whose Friendship Hill homestead is nearby.

== History ==
The original bridge was constructed in 1930 by the Point Marion Bridge Company and rehabilitated in 1976.

It was a historically significant bridge due to the relatively unusual cantilever truss design and was listed on the National Register of Historic Places as the second oldest bridge of this type in the state.

It was replaced by the new Point Marion Bridge in October 2009. The old bridge was imploded on November 16, 2009.

== Gallery ==
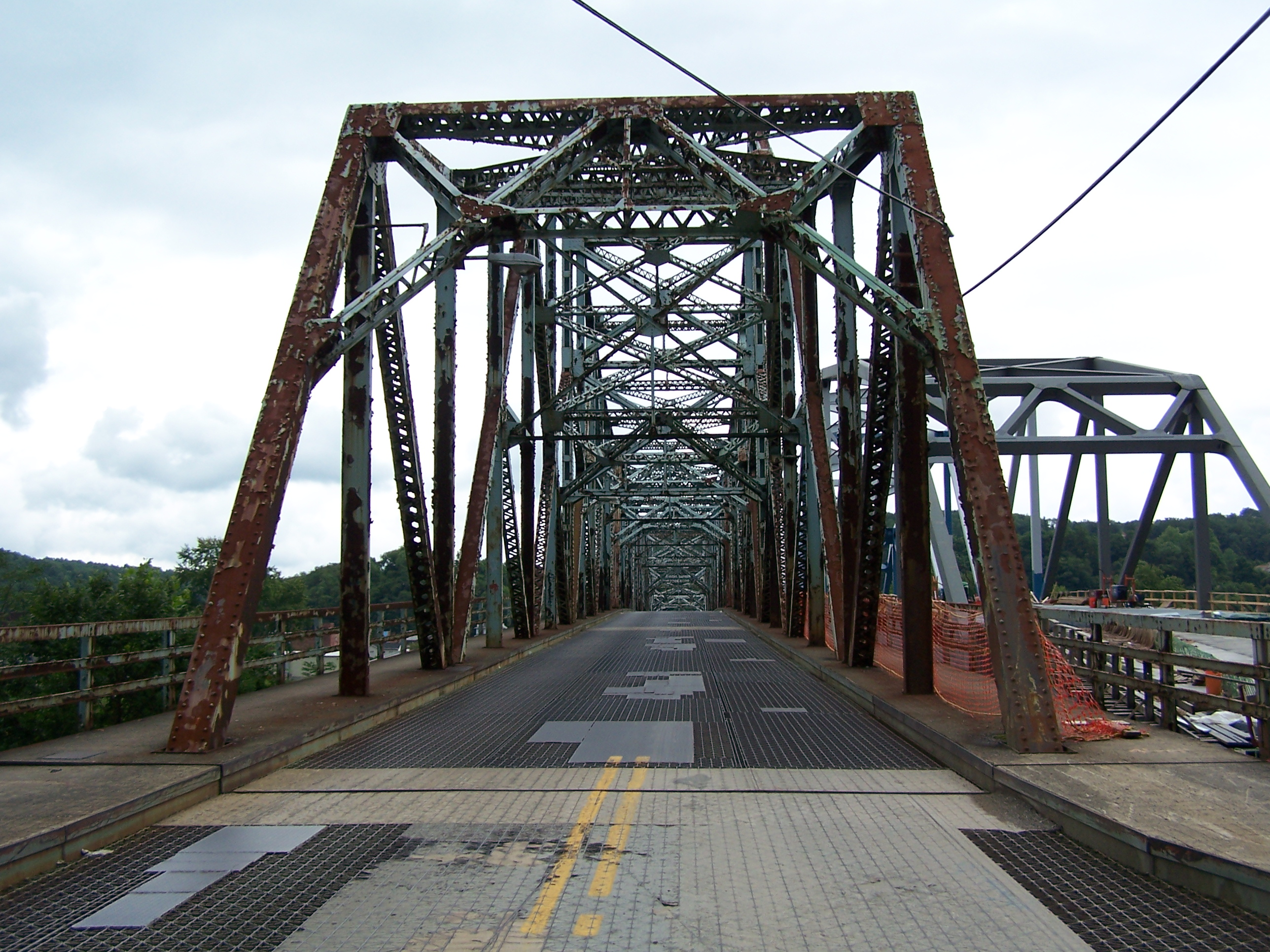
West end of the 1930 bridge.

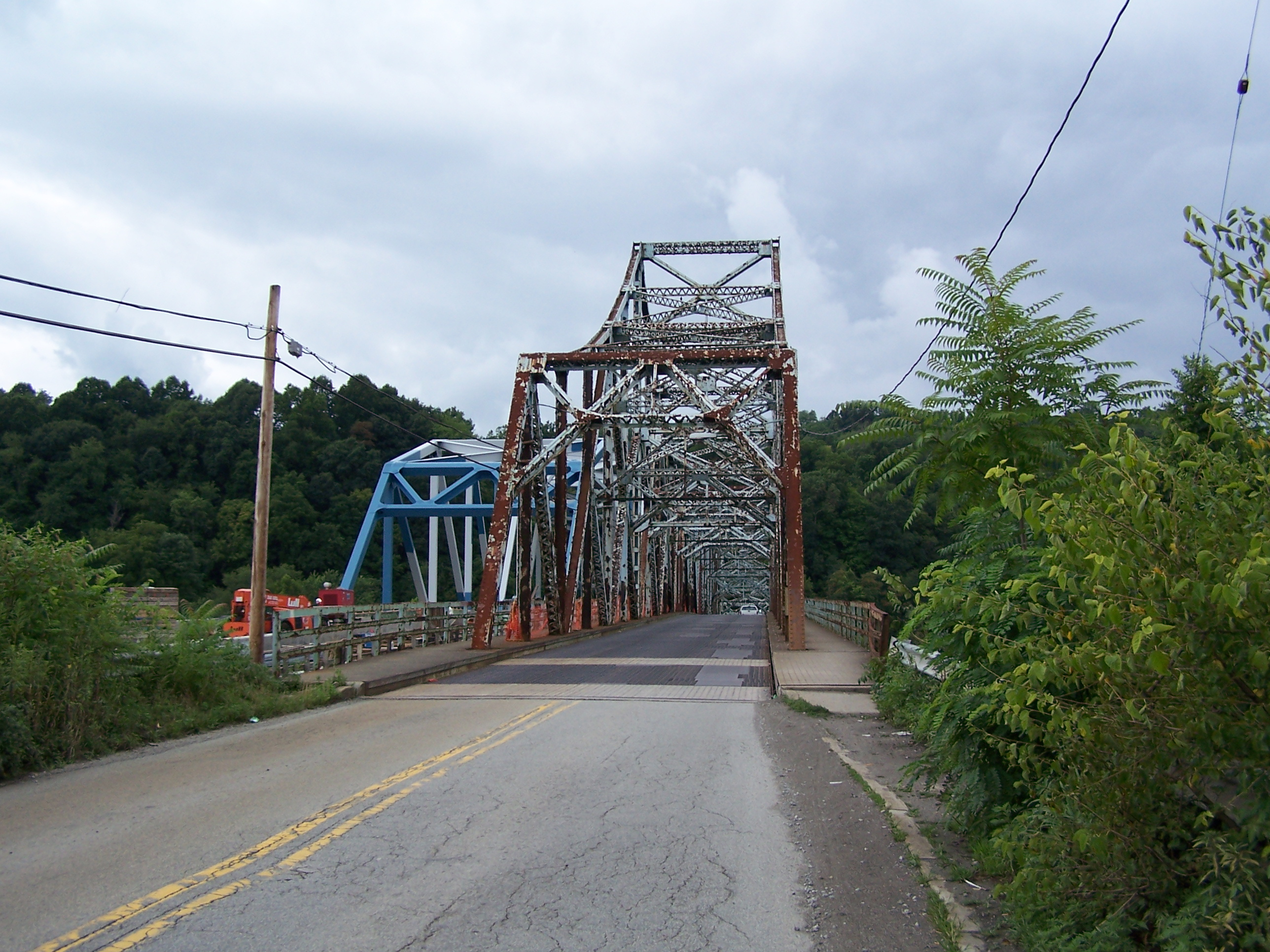
East end of the 1930 bridge.

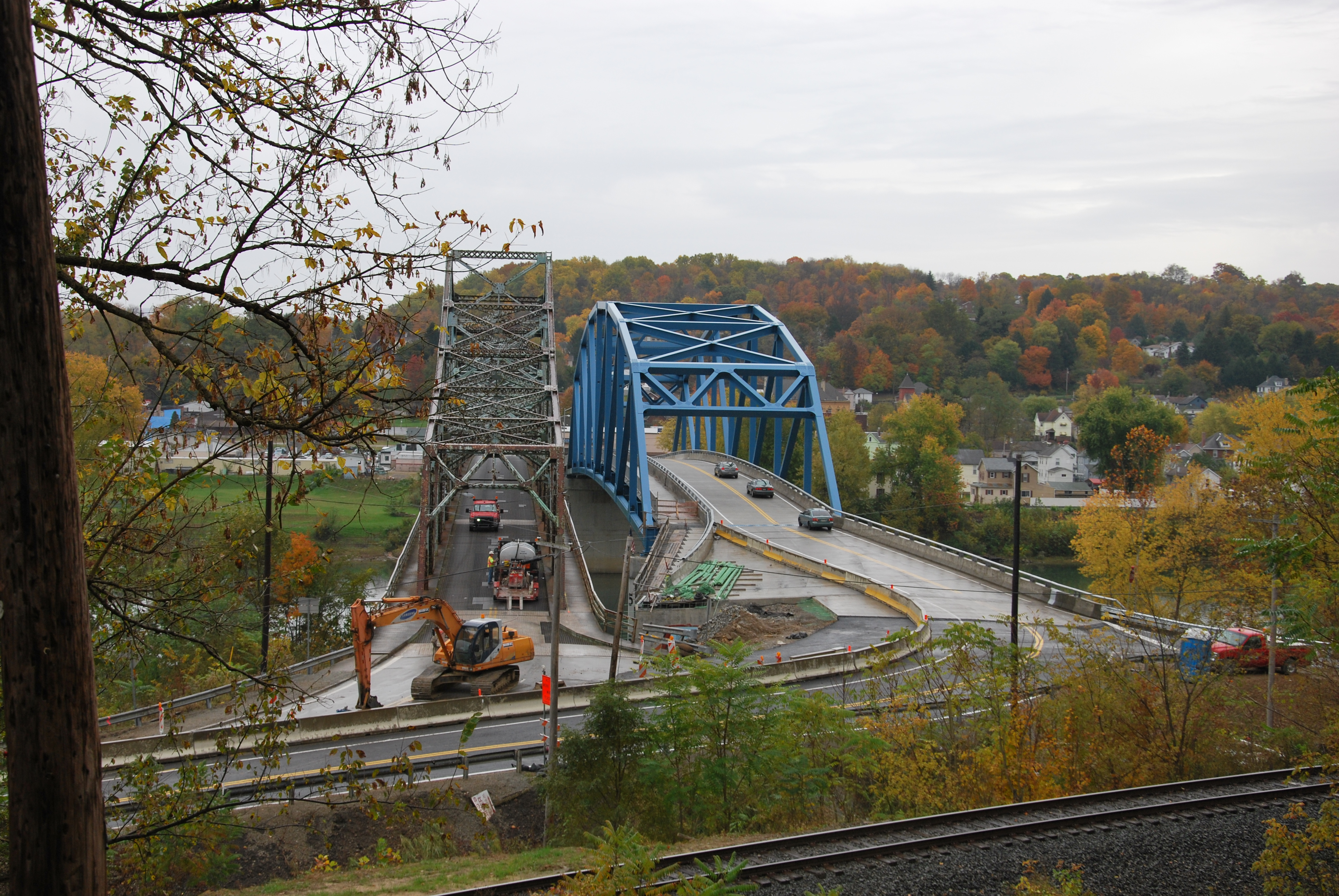
West end of the 1930 and 2009 bridges.

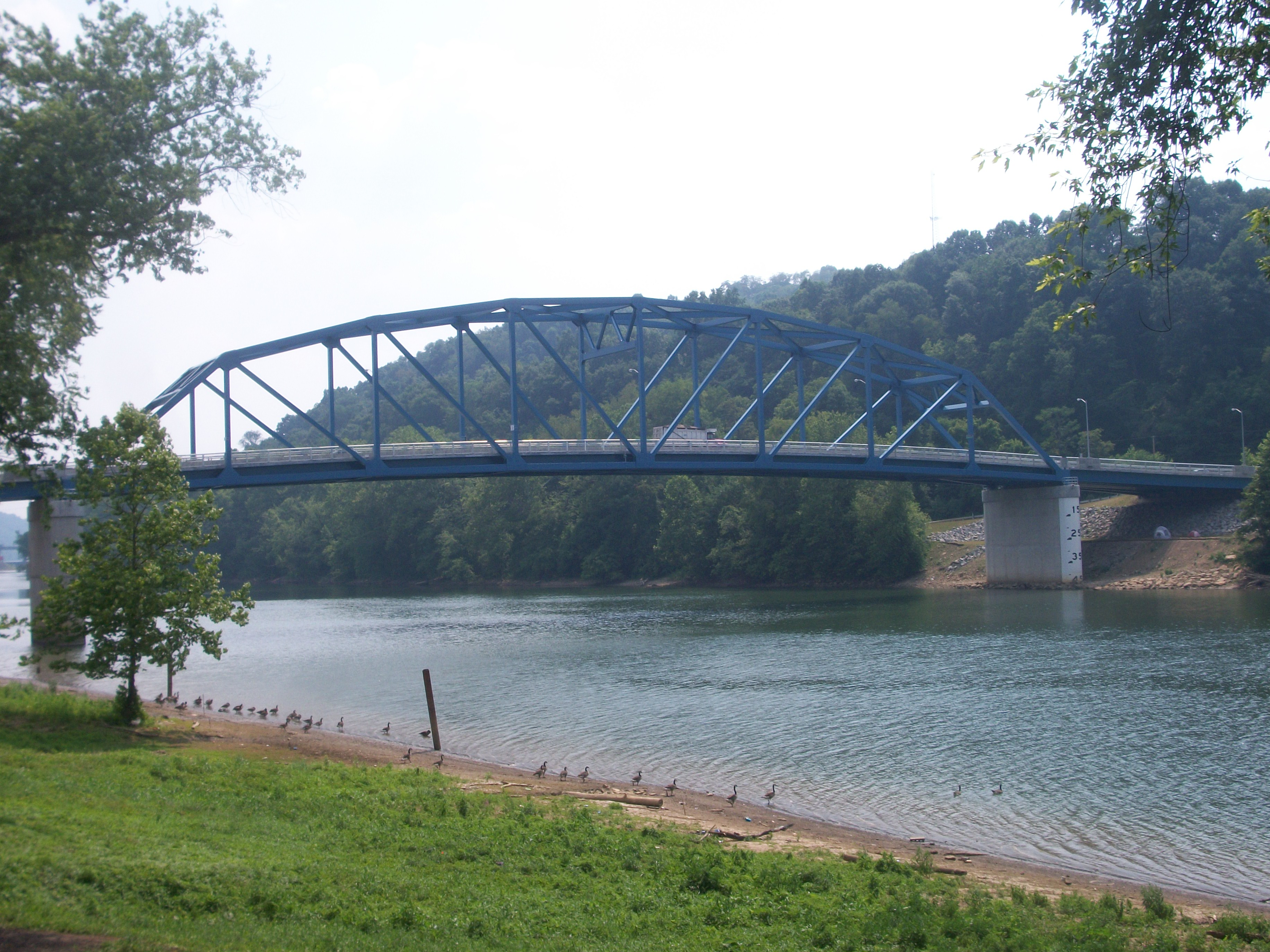
The new bridge standing alone in 2010.

== See also ==
- List of crossings of the Monongahela River
