= History of turnpikes and canals in the United States =

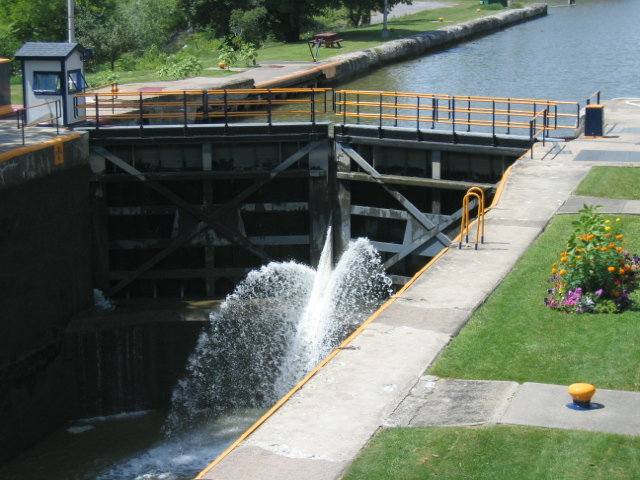
A lock on the Erie Canal

The history of turnpikes and canals in the United States began with work attempted and accomplished in the Thirteen Colonies, predicated on European technology. After gaining independence, the United States grew westward, crossing the Appalachian Mountains with the admission of new states and then doubling in size with the Louisiana Purchase in 1803. The only means of transportation at the time between the coastal states and interior lands remained on water, by canoe, boat (e.g. keelboat or flatboat) and ship, or over land on foot and by pack animal. Recognizing the success of Roman roads in unifying that empire, political and business leaders in the United States began to construct roads and canals to connect the disparate parts of the nation.

== Background ==
After its victory in the American Revolutionary War, the fledgling United States became sovereign over an area stretching along the Atlantic seaboard from New Hampshire to Georgia, and as far inland as the Mississippi River, encompassing an area exceeding that of any western European nation of the time. While the coastal trade was relatively developed, the nation possessed limited transportation and communication lines with its interior, other than advantageous interior river systems and their interconnecting portages. Within the Northwest Territory, the Congress of the Confederation set precedent with the Northwest Ordinance concerning ownership of the lands, with known transportation routes as "common highways and forever free." The need for internal improvements of these natural resources was widely recognized at the time. The preliminary report of the Inland Waterways Commission in 1808 provides a description of the early development of transportation and communication infrastructure: "The earliest movement toward developing the inland waterways of the country began when, under the influence of George Washington, Virginia and Maryland appointed commissioners primarily to consider the navigation and improvement of the Potomac; they met in 1786 in Alexandria and adjourned to Mount Vernon, where they planned for extension, pursuant to which they reassembled with representatives of other States in Annapolis in 1786; again finding the task a growing one, a further conference was arranged in Philadelphia in 1787, with delegates from all the States. There the deliberations resulted in the framing of the Constitution, whereby the thirteen original States were united primarily on a commercial basis—the commerce of the times being chiefly by water."

== Toll roads ==
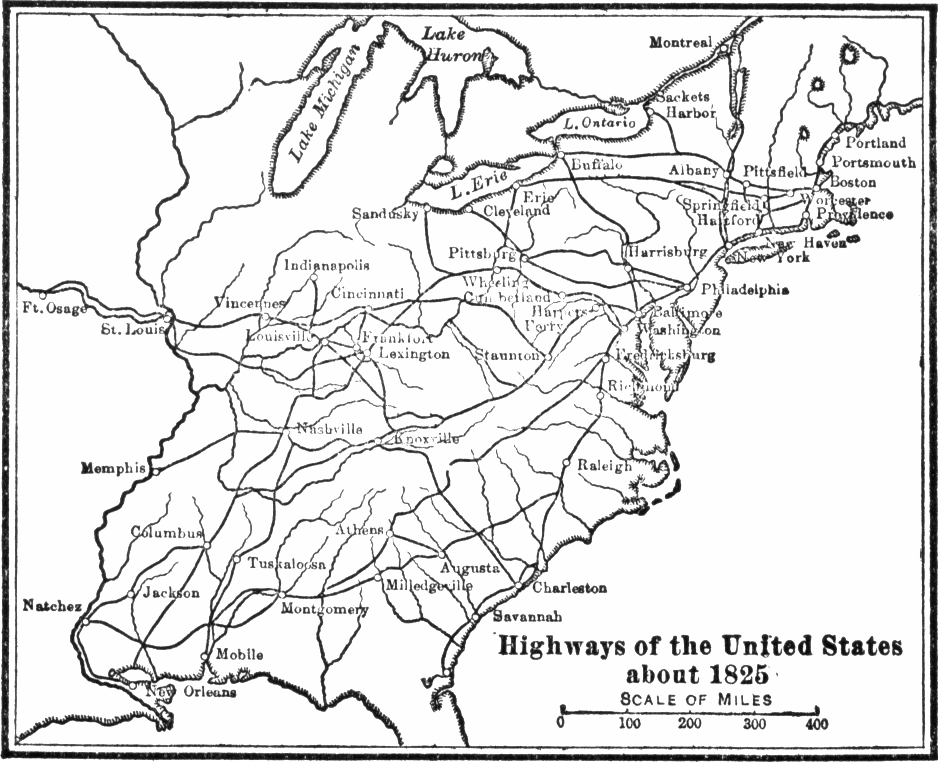
Highways in the USA circa 1825

Early turnpikes (toll roads) were constructed between some commercial centers and were owned by joint-stock companies that sold stock to raise construction capital, such as the Lancaster Turnpike Company of Pennsylvania in 1795. Secretary of the Treasury Albert Gallatin's 1808 "Report on the Subject of Public Roads and Canals" suggests that the federal government should fund the construction of interstate toll roads and canals. While transportation needs were universally recognized, many Anti-Federalists opposed the federal government assuming such a role. The British coastal blockade in the War of 1812, and an inadequate internal capability to respond, demonstrated the United States' reliance upon such overland roads for military operations as well as for general commerce.

Construction on the westward National Road began in 1815 at Cumberland, Maryland, and it reached Wheeling, Virginia, by 1818; by 1824 private tollways connected Cumberland eastward with commercial and port cities. Further westward extensions were constructed to Vandalia, Illinois, but financial crisis ultimately prevented its planned western extension to the Mississippi and Missouri Rivers. Nevertheless, the road became a primary overland route over the Appalachian Mountains and the gateway for the surge of westward-bound settlers and immigrants.

== Canals ==
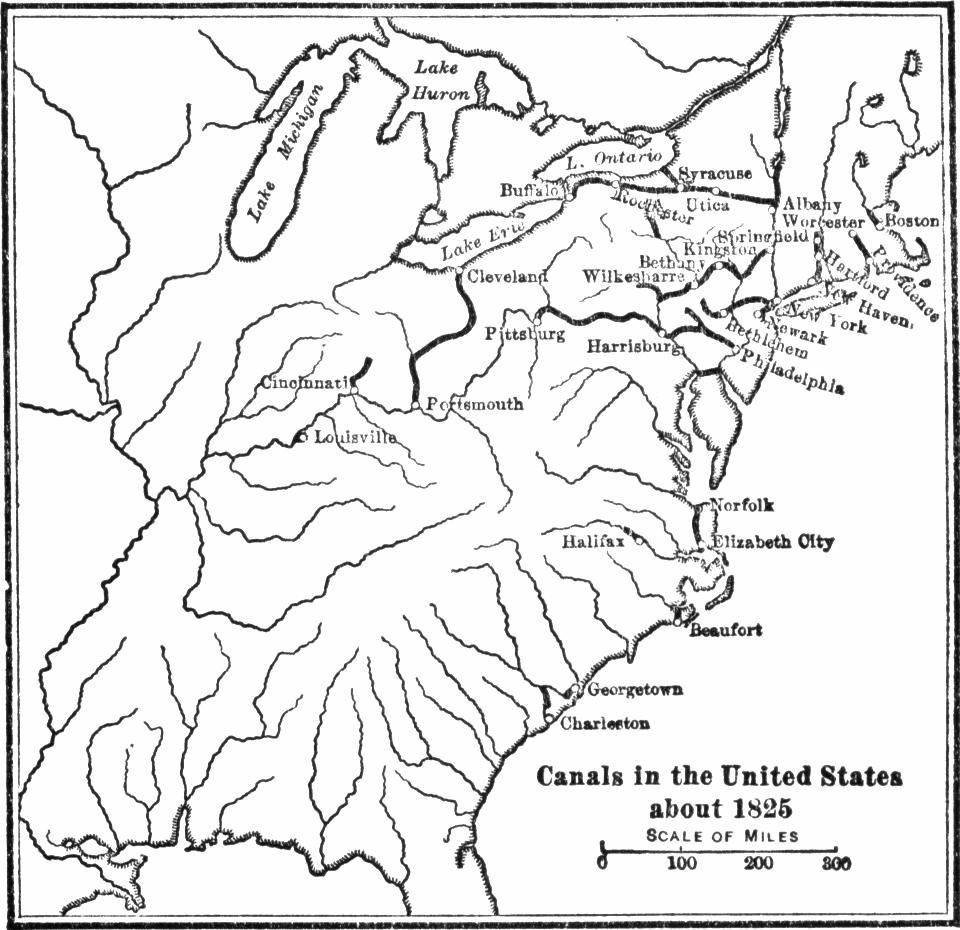
USA canals circa 1825

The seal of the Proprietors of the Locks and Canals on Connecticut River in the County of Hampshire, Massachusetts

Canal companies had been chartered in the states, and canals were constructed, owned, and operated by private joint-stock companies. The first to complete this work was the Proprietors of the Locks and Canals on Connecticut River, which was chartered on February 23, 1792, with the signature of Governor John Hancock. By 1795 the Proprietors had completed the South Hadley Canal, the first navigable canal to be completed in the United States. Continuing their work, the Proprietors turned their attention to the Turners Falls Canal to the north, which opened in 1798. Many other canal ventures existed at this time, but of all the canals projected for construction, only four additional had been completed by the outbreak of the War of 1812: the Dismal Swamp Canal in Virginia, the Santee Canal in South Carolina, the Bellows Falls Canal in Vermont and the Middlesex Canal in Massachusetts. After the war, New York authorized construction of the Erie Canal in 1817. Proposed by Governor of New York De Witt Clinton, the Erie was the first canal project undertaken as a public good to be financed at public risk through the issuance of bonds. When the project was completed in 1825, the canal linked the Hudson River to Lake Erie via 83 separate locks and over a distance of 363 miles (584 km).

This bold bid for the western trade to their north alarmed the competing merchants of Philadelphia, since the completion of the National Road also threatened to divert much of their traffic south to Baltimore. In 1825, the legislature of Pennsylvania grappled with the problem by projecting a series of canals to connect Philadelphia with Pittsburgh in the west and with Lake Erie and the upper Susquehanna to the north. The success of the Erie Canal spawned a boom of canal building around the country; over 3,326 miles of man-made waterways were constructed between 1816 and 1840. Small towns like Syracuse, New York, Buffalo, New York, and Cleveland, Ohio located along major canal routes boomed into major industrial and trade centers, while exuberant canal building pushed some states like Pennsylvania, Ohio, and Indiana to the brink of bankruptcy.

== Political differences ==
The United States government had funded and constructed improvements along its coastline beginning with the founding of the United States Army Corps of Engineers in 1775, and many politicians wanted them to contribute to construction of works "of a civil nature" as well. Before 1800, the Corps supervised the construction of coastal fortifications, but they also constructed lighthouses, helped develop jetties and piers for harbors, and carefully mapped the changing navigation channels. Although temporarily downsized following the Revolutionary War, the Corps was reestablished in 1802 and began constructing and repairing fortifications in Norfolk and New Orleans. The fortification appropriations proliferated during the five years of diplomatic tension that preceded the War of 1812; these substantially expanded the system of fortifications protecting New York Harbor and convinced the commanders of the British Navy to avoid attacking that strategic location. Following the war, the United States developed an expanded system of more modern fortifications to provide the first line of land defense against the threat of attack from European powers. Outside of defense issues, however, federal power over internal improvements away from the coasts and among the states did not gain political consensus. Federal assistance for internal improvements evolved slowly and haphazardly—the product of contentious congressional factions and an executive branch generally concerned with avoiding unconstitutional federal intrusions into state affairs.

In his first message to Congress, Federalist President John Adams advocated for construction of roads and canals on a national basis and for the establishment of observatories and a national university. In 1806 Democratic-Republican President Thomas Jefferson also had recommended many internal improvements for Congress to consider, including the creation of necessary amendments to the Constitution to allow themselves such powers. Adams did not share Jefferson's view of the limitations of the Constitution. In much alarm Jefferson suggested to James Madison the desirability of having Virginia adopt a new set of resolutions, founded on those of 1798, and directed against the acts for internal improvements.

The magnitude of the transportation problem was such that neither individual states nor private corporations seemed able to meet the demands of expanding internal trade. As early as 1807, Albert Gallatin had advocated the construction of a great system of internal waterways to connect east and west, at an estimated cost of $20,000,000. These improvements would generally be upon public lands under the exclusive jurisdiction of the federal government, not state lands. However, the only contribution of the federal government to internal improvements during the Jeffersonian era was an appropriation in 1806 of two percent of the net proceeds of the sales of public lands in Ohio for the construction of a national road, with the consent of the states through which it should pass. By 1818 the National Road was open to traffic from Cumberland, Maryland to Wheeling, Virginia.

In 1816, with the uneven experiences of the war quite evident, the national aspects of the problem could not be ignored. In 1817 Congress undertook consideration a bill drafted by John C. Calhoun proposing an appropriation of $1,500,000 for internal improvements. Because this appropriation was to be met by earmarked revenue "bonus" as well as future dividends from the Second Bank of the United States, the bill was commonly referred to as the "Bonus Bill". But on the day before he left office, President Madison vetoed the bill because he felt it was unconstitutional. Having less regard for consistency, the House of Representatives recorded its conviction, by close votes, that Congress could appropriate money to construct roads and canals but did not have the power to construct them. The only direct aid of the national government for internal improvements remained various appropriations, amounting to about $1,500,000 for the Cumberland Road.

As the country recovered from financial depression following the Panic of 1819, the question of internal improvements again forged to the front. In 1822, a bill to authorize the collection of tolls on the Cumberland Road was vetoed by President James Monroe. In an elaborate essay, he set forth his views on the constitutional aspects of a policy of internal improvements. Congress might appropriate money, Monroe admitted, but it might not undertake the actual construction of national works nor assume jurisdiction over them. For the moment the drift toward a larger participation of the national government in internal improvements was stayed.

== Governmental involvement in internal improvements ==
In March 1824 the Supreme Court issued a landmark decision in Gibbons v. Ogden, ruling that the power to regulate interstate commerce was granted to Congress by the Commerce Clause of the United States Constitution. The Court went on to conclude that Congressional power extends to the regulation of all aspects of commerce, overriding state law to the contrary.

In the presidential campaign of 1824, Speaker of the House Henry Clay, the foremost proponent of the 'American System', pleaded for a larger conception of the functions of the national government. He called attention to provisions made for coastal surveys and lighthouses on the Atlantic seaboard and deplored the neglect of the interior of the country. Senator and war hero Andrew Jackson voted for the General Survey Act, as did Secretary of State John Quincy Adams, who left no doubt that he did not support the narrow views of his New England region on this issue. William H. Crawford felt the constitutional scruples being voiced in the South and followed the old expedient of advocating for a constitutional amendment to sanction national internal improvements.

Shortly thereafter, Congress passed two important laws that would set a new course concerning federal involvement in internal improvements. In April Congress passed the General Survey Act, which authorized the president to have surveys made of routes for roads and canals "of national importance, in a commercial or military point of view, or necessary for the transportation of public mail;" this is sometimes referred to as the first "Roads and Canals" Act. It authorized the survey of waterways to designate those "capable of sloop navigation." The second act, "An Act to Improve the Navigation of the Ohio and Mississippi Rivers," was passed in May; it appropriated $75,000 to improve navigation on the Ohio and Mississippi rivers by removing sandbars, snags, and other obstacles. The second act is often called the first rivers and harbors legislation. The president assigned responsibility for the road, canal and waterway surveys as well as the navigation improvements to the Corps of Engineers, marking marked the beginning of its continuous involvement in domestic civil works.

In 1826 Congress expanded the workload of the Corps of Engineers and the pace of improvements. The legislation authorized the president to have river surveys made to clean out and deepen selected waterways and to make various other river and harbor improvements. It was also the first legislation of this type to combine authorizations for both surveys and projects, thereby establishing the pattern for future work.

Some political differences did remain. In March 1826 the Virginia general assembly declared that all the principles of their earlier resolutions applied "with full force against the powers assumed by Congress" in passing acts to further internal improvements and to protect manufacturers. That the John Quincy Adams administration would meet with opposition in Congress was a foregone conclusion.

== See also ==
- Technological and industrial history of the United States
- Waterways of West Virginia
