= List of General Survey Act of 1824 surveys and projects =

Notable surveys and projects undertaken under the General Survey Act of 1824

General Survey Act
- Long title: An Act to procure the necessary surveys, plans, and estimates, on the subject of roads and canals.
- Enacted by: the 18th United States Congress
- Effective: April 30, 1824

Citations
- Statutes at Large: 4 Stat. 22

Legislative history
- Introduced in the House as H.R. 11 by Joseph Hemphill on January 1824; Passed the House on February 10, 1824 (115–86); Passed the Senate on April 23, 1824 (27–18); Signed into law by President James Monroe on April 30, 1824

United States Supreme Court cases
- Gibbons v. Ogden

The General Survey Act was a United States law, signed on April 30, 1824, authorizing the president to employ military and civil engineers to survey, plan, and estimate routes for roads and canals of national importance. The War Department executed the statute through the Board of Engineers for Internal Improvements (formed May 31, 1824). The Act authorized surveys, plans, and estimates, not federal construction, and departmental instructions sometimes directed comparative studies that included railway alternatives when evaluating "roads."

By the late 1820s, critics objected to loaning Army officers to private corporations, to extra-compensation practices, and to perceived diversion from purely public duties. Amid fiscal retrenchment and shifting Jacksonian politics, Congress repealed the General Survey Act in 1838, ending direct engineering aid to non-federal projects. This is a list of notable surveys and projects undertaken by the War Department's Board of Engineers for Internal Improvements under the General Survey Act (1824). Items are grouped by mode; entries point to documented surveys, plans, or comparative examinations performed within the Act's authority.

== Canals ==
- Chesapeake and Ohio Canal route (1824–1826) – Early Board priority; survey reports, plans, and estimates transmitted to Congress (Dec. 7, 1826).
- Buzzards Bay–Barnstable Bay ship canal (1826) – Secretary of War transmitted a memoir on the surveyed route with drawings (H. Doc. 19-77).
- Mississippi River–Lake Pontchartrain canal (1826–1827) – Information and plans submitted in response to House resolution (read Mar. 3, 1827).
- Waters of Virginia and North Carolina (Dismal Swamp system) (1826) – Engineer Department report on an internal navigation system (read Mar. 1, 1826).
- Illinois River–Lake Michigan connection (1826–1827) – Federal aid and survey documentation toward a canal link; congressional canal-aid bill activity in 1826 supports the survey program.

== Roads ==
- Detroit–Fort Dearborn military road (Chicago Road) (1825) – Congress authorized the survey and opening (Mar. 3, 1825; ch. 120, 4 Stat. 135).
- Memphis–Little Rock road (Military Road) (1824) – Act authorized surveying/making a road from opposite Memphis to Little Rock.
- Little Rock–Cantonment Gibson road (Arkansas Territory) (1825) – Authorized by act of Mar. 3, 1825 (listed in Statutes at Large index).
- St. Mary's River–Tampa Bay road (Florida) (1825) – Authorized by act of Mar. 3, 1825 (listed in Statutes at Large index).
- Zanesville–St. Louis (National Road extension reconnaissance) (1829) – Presidential message transmitting the commissioner's laying-out report (Feb. 7, 1829).
- Baltimore–Philadelphia post road (alternative routes survey) (1826–1827) – Congressional request led to War Dept./Postmaster submissions with route maps.

== Railroads ==
- Baltimore and Ohio Railroad assistance (1827–1830) – On military grounds, War Secretary James Barbour detailed Army Engineer and Topographical officers to assist the company's reconnaissance and surveys in 1827; by order of May 12, 1828, the Board assigned Col. Stephen Harriman Long and Capt. William Gibbs McNeill to make definitive locations; the engineers' Baltimore–Potomac alignment report is dated June 23, 1828; continued reporting followed in 1829.
- Hudson–Berkshire County route (Boston and Hudson River surveys) (1828–1829) – The Engineer Department detailed Lt. Col. P. H. Perrault (Corps of Topographical Engineers) and assistants; the House printed Perrault's materials as H. Doc. 20-89 (read January 21, 1829), and engineer William Clark Young's report bears the date February 4, 1829; these informed later work toward the Western Railroad.
- Canajoharie & Catskill Railroad (1830–1831) – Survey and report executed "under direction of the Engineer Department of the United States;" Capt. John Pickell's official report and plates were printed in 1831.
- Catskill & Ithaca Railroad (1830) – Topographical Engineers examined the route and reported to state authorities; the work is noted in contemporary assembly documents and in the engineering literature.
- Ithaca & Owego Railroad (1828–1830) – Engineer Department–aided surveys and design recommendations for the portage between Cayuga Lake and the Susquehanna; a printed "Report of the Survey of the Ithaca and Owego Rail Road" appeared in 1828.
- Roanoke–James–Kanawha corridor comparison (1826) – Under departmental instructions to the Board of Engineers for Internal Improvements, officers examined whether canal or rail would better connect the waters along this corridor; a comparative study undertaken within the Act's survey program, with reporting noted in engineering histories.

== Notes ==
The General Survey authority covered surveys, plans, and estimates; construction normally proceeded under state/private auspices or different federal statutes. For holdings and correspondence of the Board, see Record Group 77 at the National Archives and Records Administration (NARA).

Railroad entries reflect departmental assignments or comparative examinations under the Act; many early railroad surveys employed Army officers in non-departmental roles and are therefore not included.

== See also ==
- Board of Engineers for Internal Improvements
- Corps of Topographical Engineers
- General Survey Act
