= Alvin F. Harlow =

American writer and biographer

- Born: Alvin Fay Harlow; March 10, 1875; Sedalia, Missouri, U.S.
- Died: November 17, 1963 (aged 88); New York City, U.S.
- Education: Franklin College
- Occupation: Writer
- Spouse: Dora Shockley
- Writing career
- Language: English
- Years active: 1926–1963
- Genres: History; Biography

Alvin Fay Harlow (March 10, 1875 – November 17, 1963) was an American writer and biographer. A historian, Harlow's writing focused often on America infrastructure, including transportation and communication, and New York history. He was also biographer, serving as official biographer of Eddie Foy Sr. and Jefferson De Angelis. He also wrote hundreds of entries for the Dictionary of American Biography and Dictionary of American History. His style was described as "homespun" and "factual."

== Early life and education ==
Alvin Fay Harlow was born in Sedalia, Missouri, on March 10, 1875. Harlow's father was an express messenger for the Missouri–Kansas–Texas Railroad.

As a child, Harlow was interested in the history of the American West, including the James–Younger Gang. As a little boy, his family moved to Kentucky, living in Covington. The family moved to North Vernon, Indiana when Harlow was 12.

He attended Franklin College, graduating in 1899.

== Career and life ==
After college, he worked at an engraving company in Indianapolis. In 1908, he became secretary-treasurer of the Grand View Coal & Timber Company. During his time with the company, he worked in Appalachia, where he created educational films about Appalachian people.

He started working in advertising and journalism in 1913. He wrote business news articles and advertising copy for magazines.

Harlow shifted his writing to focus on history, documenting detailed, specialized books about various facets of American culture. In 1926, he published his first book Old Towpaths. The book explored the history of canals in the United States. His second book, Old Waybills: The Romance of the Express Companies, was published in 1934 and studied express companies – reflecting on his father's career. He also wrote books about the history of postal carrier bags, the Bowery, stamp collecting, and a children's book about the use of the telegraph in the American Civil War.

He also wrote biographies, including being the official biographer of Eddie Foy Sr. and Jefferson De Angelis. He also wrote biographies about Joel Chandler Harris, Bret Harte, Theodore Roosevelt and the Ringling brothers. Harlow also wrote over 300 articles for the Dictionary of American History and over 100 articles for the Dictionary of American Biography.

Harlow married Dora Shockley. The couple did research together, spending long days at the New York Public Library.

== Later life and death ==
Harlow was awarded an honorary degree from Franklin College. He was an honorary member of the New York Historical Society. He was a professional member of the Authors League of America and the Society of American Historians.

He died at age 88 at Riverdale Nursing Home in the Bronx on November 17, 1963.

== Legacy ==
A decade worth of Harlow's manuscripts are held in the collection of the University of Tulsa's McFarlin Library.

== Selected works by Alvin F. Harlow ==
- Old Bowery Days: The Chronicles of a Famous Street. New York: D. Appleton & Co., 1931.
- with Kennedy, Millard Fillmore. Schoolmaster of Yesterday: A Three-Generation Story, 1820-1919. New York: Whittlesey House, McGraw-Hill Book Co., 1940.
- Paper Chase: The Amenities of Stamp Collecting. New York: Henry Holt and Company, 1940.
- Brass-pounders: Young Telegraphers of the Civil War. Denver: Sage Books, 1962.
