= General Survey Act =

1824 U.S. act authorizing Army engineer surveys of roads and canals

- Long title: An Act to procure the necessary surveys, plans, and estimates, on the subject of roads and canals.
- Enacted by: the 18th United States Congress
- Effective: April 30, 1824

Citations
- Statutes at Large: 4 Stat. 22

Legislative history
- Introduced in the House as H.R. 11 by Joseph Hemphill on January 1824; Passed the House on February 10, 1824 (115–86); Passed the Senate on April 23, 1824 (27–18); Signed into law by President James Monroe on April 30, 1824

The General Survey Act was a United States law, signed on April 30, 1824, authorizing the president to employ military and civil engineers to survey, plan, and estimate routes for roads and canals of national importance. The War Department executed the statute through the Board of Engineers for Internal Improvements (formed May 31, 1824). The Act authorized surveys, plans, and estimates, not federal construction, and administrative instructions sometimes directed comparative studies that included railway alternatives when evaluating “roads.”

In the same month as the Act, Congress separately appropriated $75,000 to clear obstructions on the Ohio–Mississippi system, initiating federal river-improvement work.

== Background and legislative context ==
Federal interest in internal improvements long predated 1824. Albert Gallatin’s 1808 Report on Roads and Canals proposed national surveys and engineering aid; House reports in 1822 advanced the concept; and President James Monroe’s 1823 annual message endorsed employing Army engineers for a Chesapeake–to–Lake Erie canal chain—all laying the policy groundwork for the General Survey Act.

In a separate statute the following month—often treated as the first Rivers and Harbors Act—Congress appropriated $75,000 “for removing sand-bars, sawyers, and other obstructions” from the Ohio and Mississippi; the War Department executed this work through Army engineers, helping to establish the Corps’ civil-works role.

== Notable surveys and projects ==
- Chesapeake and Ohio Canal (1824–): Early Board priority under the Act; Army engineers organized route examinations and estimates for a Potomac–Cumberland line.
- Roanoke–James–Kanawha corridor (1826): Under War Department instructions to the Board of Engineers, officers examined whether a canal or a railway would better connect the waters along this corridor—a comparative study undertaken within the Act's survey program. The statute itself named only “roads and canals”; treating railways as a form of “road” in such surveys reflected administrative practice, not a change to the law.
- Detroit–Fort Dearborn military road (Chicago Road): Congress appropriated funds to survey a road between Detroit and Chicago and, by act of March 3, 1825, authorized its survey and opening (4 Stat. 135). Contemporary Michigan references also note an 1824 congressional appropriation “for a survey of the Great Sauk Trail (now U.S. 12)” with an additional appropriation in 1825. Commerce and the mail soon traveled much faster on what was called the Chicago Road.
- Baltimore and Ohio Railroad assistance (1827–1830): On military grounds, War Secretary James Barbour detailed Army Engineer and Topographical officers to the railroad to help survey and organize the line.

== Administration and scope ==
The War Department executed the Act through the Board of Engineers for Internal Improvements. Its membership included Army Engineer officers (e.g., Simon Bernard, Joseph G. Totten) and detailed Topographical Engineers (e.g., John J. Abert, James Kearney, William G. McNeill, Guillaume Tell Poussin) leading survey parties across multiple states. The statute authorized surveys, plans, and estimates, not federal construction, and departmental instructions sometimes directed comparative studies (e.g., canal vs. railway) while evaluating “roads.” Demand for surveys expanded rapidly. Contemporary tabulations show several dozen Army engineers engaged by 1825–1826 as states and corporations requested assistance within the authorized program.

== Policy limits and repeal ==
By the late 1820s, critics objected to loaning Army officers to private corporations, to extra-compensation practices, and to perceived diversion from purely public duties. Amid fiscal retrenchment and shifting Jacksonian politics, Congress repealed the General Survey Act in 1838, ending direct engineering aid to non-federal projects. In the same year, Congress recognized the Corps of Topographical Engineers as a separate bureau under John James Abert, and federal survey work continued under other authorities.

== Impact and legacy ==
The Act supplied organizational capacity and trained personnel for early internal improvements, seeding methods that migrated into state agencies and private companies (notably early railroads)

Historians emphasize that broad appropriations categories gave the executive latitude to prioritize corridors and modalities inside the survey program; subsequent river-and-harbor appropriations (1829–1860) totaled tens of millions of dollars and concentrated in settled regions, while Topographical Engineer surveys underpinned later expansion.

== See also ==
- Board of Engineers for Internal Improvements
- Corps of Topographical Engineers
- United States Army Corps of Engineers
- Rivers and Harbors Act
- Internal improvements
- American System (economic plan)
- Bonus Bill of 1817
- Maysville Road veto
- National Road
