= Guillaume Tell Poussin =

French engineer and diplomat

Guillaume Tell de La Vallée-Poussin
- Born: February 10, 1794; Poissy, Yvelines, France
- Died: November 7, 1876 (aged 82); Paris, France
- Occupations: Civil Engineer, diplomat
- Known for: U.S. internal improvements; Ambassador to the United States (1848–1849)
- Spouse: Louise Roux (m. 1850)
- Children: 1 (Camille Emma Aline)
- Awards: Chevalier of the Légion d'honneur

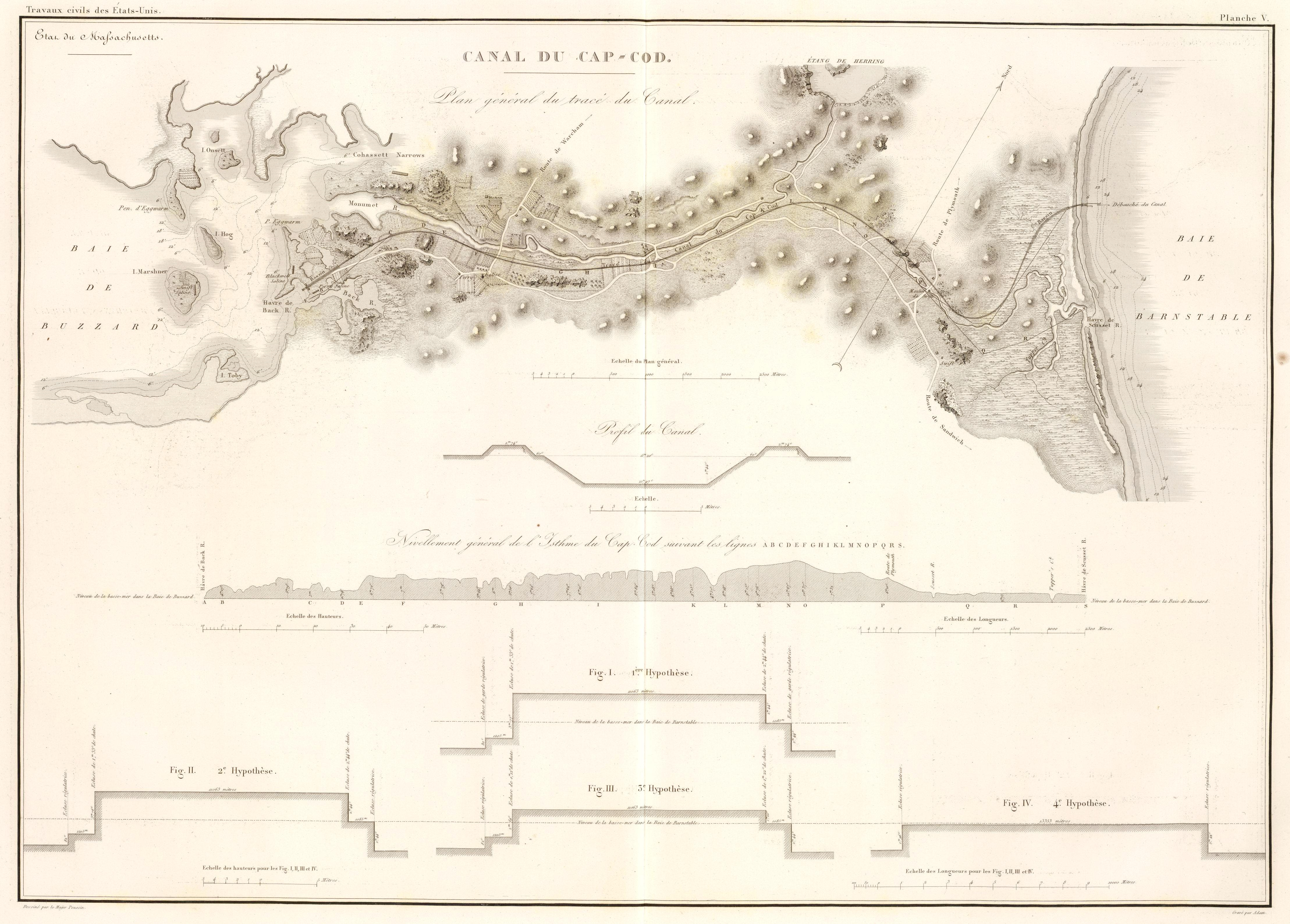
Map of the Cape Cod Canal from Poussin's Travaux d’améliorations (1834)

Guillaume Tell de La Vallée-Poussin (1794–1876) was a French engineer and diplomat. He served as a captain in the United States Army Corps of Engineers and aide-de-camp to General Simon Bernard, working under the War Department’s Board of Engineers for Internal Improvements (1824–1831) on multi-state road and canal surveys. He later interpreted American internal improvements and railways for European readers and served as ambassador of the French Second Republic to the United States (1848–1849) before recall after a dispute with U.S. Secretary of State John M. Clayton.

== Early life and education ==
Poussin was born at Poissy (Yvelines) on 10 February 1794 and was named after the republican hero William Tell. His father, Jean Étienne de La Vallée dit Poussin (1735–1802), was a painter and decorator who had won the Prix de Rome in 1759; his mother was Élisabeth Félicité Gillet (born c. 1750). In 1814 he registered as a student of architecture at the Académie des Beaux-Arts in Paris, but soon thereafter departed for the United States.

== Career ==
Poussin served as a captain in the United States Army Corps of Engineers, becoming aide-de-camp to General Simon Bernard under the War Department’s internal improvements program (often termed the Board of Engineers for Internal Improvements). Representative surveys documented in his 1834 atlas include a general map of U.S. routes; plates on the Chesapeake and Ohio Canal; an early proposal for a Cape Cod Canal; a plan for a junction canal from the Mississippi to Lake Pontchartrain; and mapping of the Chesapeake & Delaware Canal. He consolidated these efforts in Travaux d’améliorations intérieures (1834).

After returning to France in 1831, he traveled in England, Belgium, and the Rhineland to observe railway development and published Chemins de fer américains (1836), an early French-language survey of U.S. railways and their administration. From 1848 to 1849 he served as ambassador of the French Second Republic to the United States; he was recalled after a correspondence dispute with Secretary of State John M. Clayton arising from a salvage claim off Veracruz. He was named Chevalier de la Légion d'honneur. Poussin married Louise Roux in 1850; their daughter, Camille Emma Aline de La Vallée Poussin, was born in 1853. Poussin died in Paris (13 rue Say) on 7 November 1876 and was buried in the Père-Lachaise Cemetery.

== Selected works ==
- 1834: Travaux d'améliorations intérieures projetés ou exécutés par le gouvernement général des États-Unis d'Amérique, de 1824 à 1831 (Paris).
- 1836: Chemins de fer américains: historique de leur construction, prix de revient et produit; mode d’administration adopté; résumé de la législation qui les régit (Paris: Carilian-Goeury).
- 1839: Examen comparatif de la question des chemins de fer en 1839 en France et à l'étranger (Paris).
- 1841: Considérations sur le principe démocratique qui régit l'Union Américaine (Paris).
- 1843: De la puissance américaine (Paris). New edition, 1848; vol. 1 and vol. 2 on Google Books.
- 1845: La Belgique et les Belges depuis 1830 (Paris).
- 1846: Question de l'Oregon.
- 1874: Les États-Unis d'Amérique: étude historique et d'économie politique, 1815–1873 (Paris).

== Legacy and assessment ==
Poussin’s writings helped circulate American practices in internal improvements and railroad management to European audiences. Historians of technology situate his U.S. service within a broader pattern in which Army engineers—through boards and commissions—shaped antebellum infrastructure and mediated technology transfer between Europe and America.
