= Jean Gallatin =

Genevan watchmaker and politician

- Born: 6 November 1733; Geneva, Republic of Geneva
- Died: 21 October 1765 (aged 31); Geneva, Republic of Geneva
- Occupations: Watchmaker, merchant
- Known for: Member of the Council of Two Hundred
- Spouse: Sophie Albertine Rolaz (m. 1755)
- Children: 2, including Albert Gallatin
- Parent(s): Abraham Gallatin; Louise Suzanne Vaudenet

Jean Gallatin (6 November 1733 – 21 October 1765) was a watchmaker, merchant and politician from the Republic of Geneva. He was the father of Albert Gallatin, one of the Founding Fathers of the United States.

== Early life and family ==
Jean Gallatin came from a Protestant family originally from the Bugey that obtained citizenship in Geneva in 1510. He was the son of Abraham Gallatin, a watchmaker and merchant who served as a member of Geneva's Council of Two Hundred, auditor, and treasurer of the grain chamber, and Louise Suzanne Vaudenet, owner of the Vésenaz castle and a correspondent of Voltaire. Like his father, Gallatin engaged in the watchmaking trade. In 1755, he married Sophie Albertine Rolaz, from a Vaudois family that had acquired the lordship of Le Rosey, near Rolle. The couple had two children: Susanne Albertine (the elder) and Albert Gallatin (the younger), who later became a prominent member of the political elite of the United States.

== Career ==
In 1760, Gallatin founded a trading company with his father. He became a member of the Council of Two Hundred (Grand Council) in 1764.

== Connection to slavery ==
Gallatin's wife had a stake in a sugar plantation called Mat Rouge in the Dutch colony of Suriname, which employed 110 enslaved people. The estate, located on the Perica waterway (near the Cottica River, east of the Commewijne River), was managed by Nicolas David Guisan. After their mother's death in 1770, this stake passed to Albert Gallatin and his sister (who died in 1775). Due to gaps in the historical sources, it is difficult to determine precisely how the operation unfolded. The Gallatins' share of Mat Rouge was subsequently sold, though the date and price are unknown.
