= William F. Harnden =

American businessman (1812–1845)

William Frederick Harnden
- Born: 23 August 1812; Reading, Massachusetts
- Died: 14 January 1845 (aged 32); Boston, Massachusetts

William Frederick Harnden (23 August 1812 – 14 January 1845) was the founder of Harnden and Company, one of the first independent express companies in the United States. Harnden started his career with the railroads by selling tickets at the Boston and Providence Railroad depot on Washington Street in Worcester, Massachusetts. He soon started consigning express shipments by rail between Boston and Providence, Rhode Island. With his first consignment on March 4, 1839, he became the first person to send an express shipment by rail. Following the success of express shipping on this route, he expanded his business to ship express to New York City and Philadelphia.

He founded Harnden and Company, which specialized in trans-Atlantic service with offices in London, Liverpool, Paris, Le Havre and several other major European cities. In 1854 Harnden and Company merged with three other express companies to form Adams Express, led by Alvin Adams.

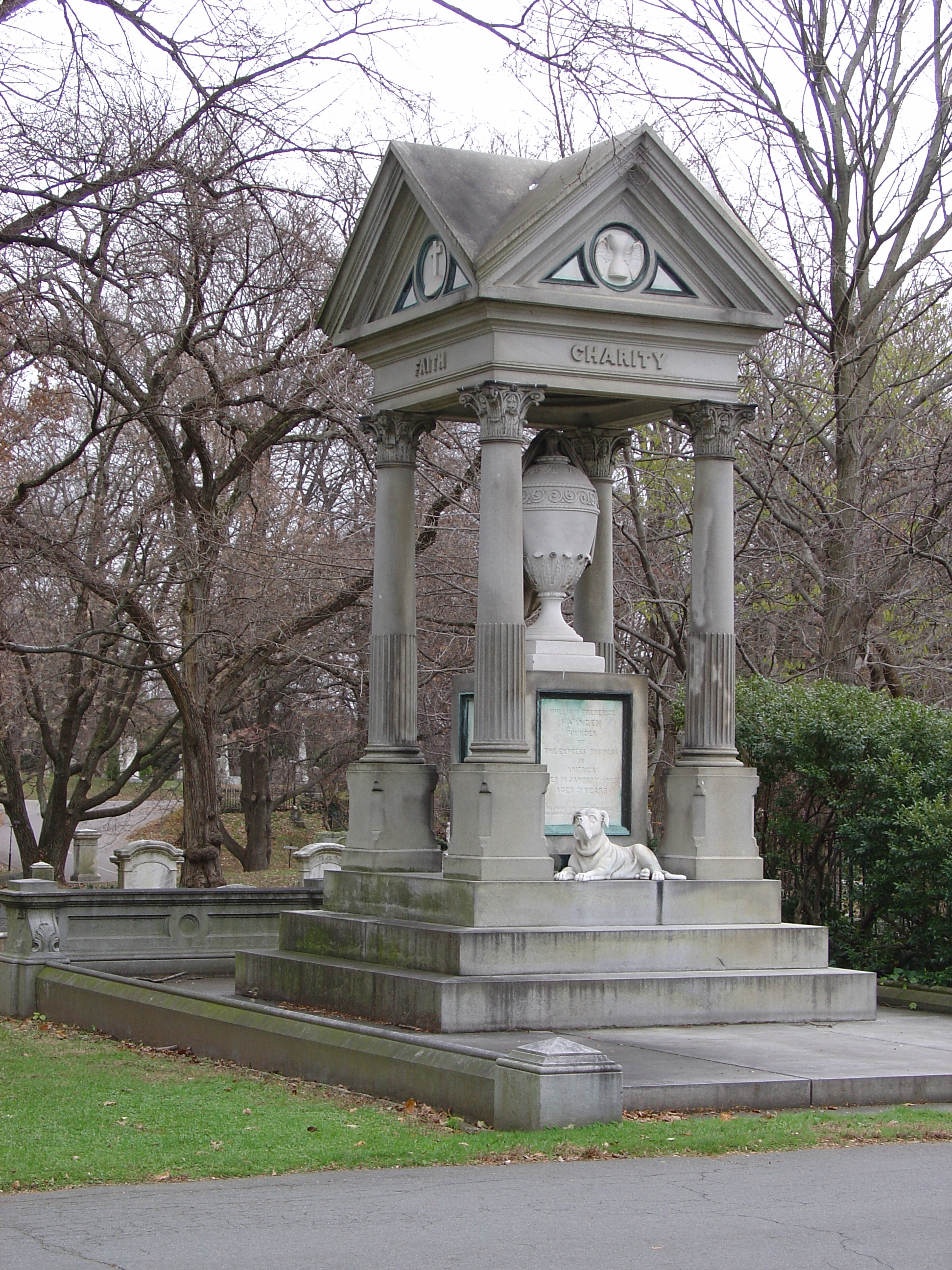
Grave of William Frederick Harnden
