= Turners Falls Canal =

Canal in Massachusetts, United States

Coordinates: 42°36′37″N 72°33′13″W

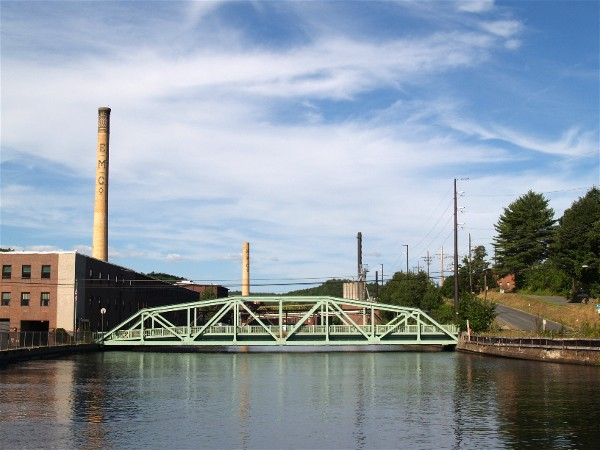
Power Canal at Turners Falls

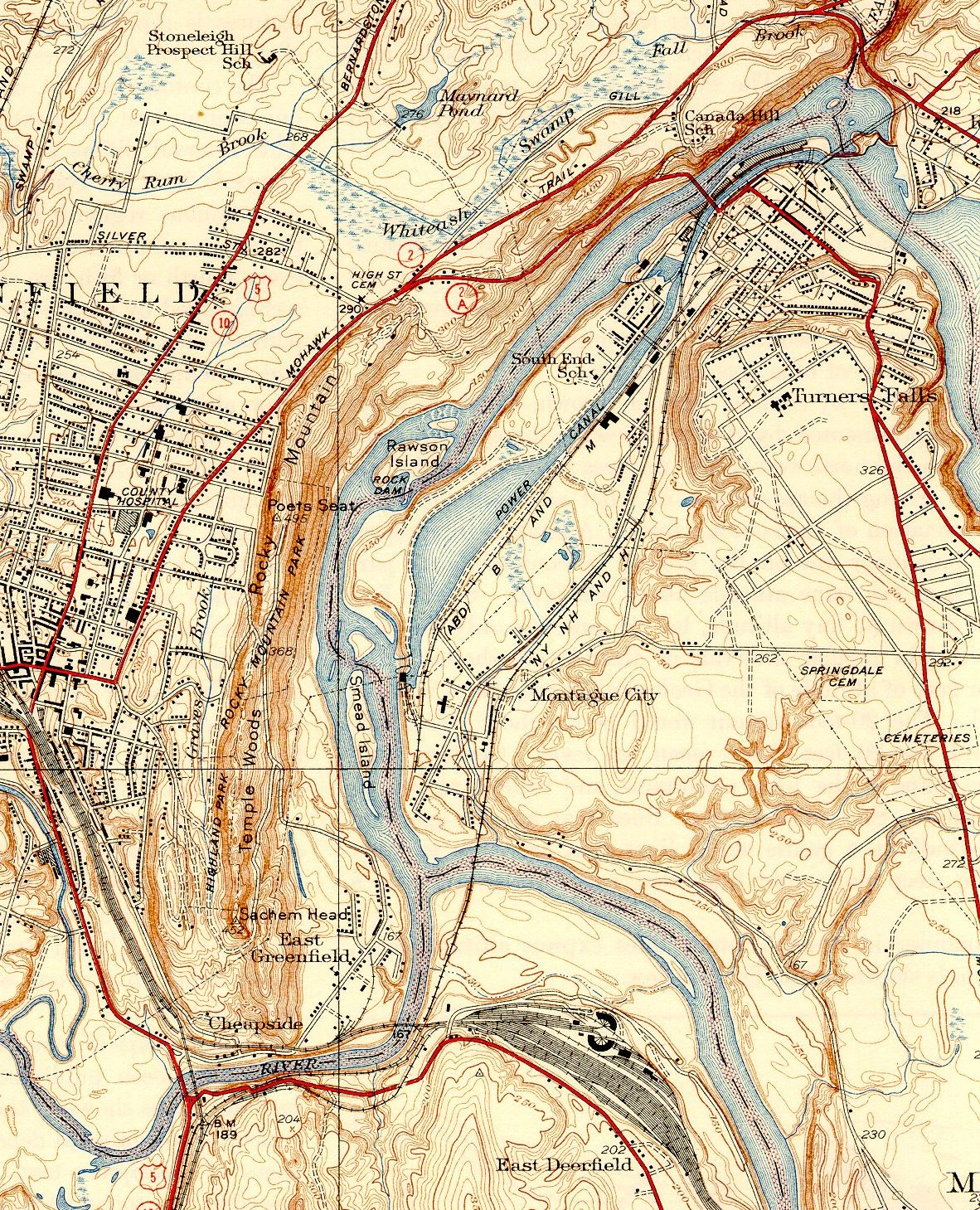
Power Canal, 1941

The Turners Falls Canal, also historically known as the Montague Canal, was a canal along the Connecticut River in Montague, Massachusetts. It was reconstructed in 1869.

The canal was first completed in 1798 by the Proprietors of the Upper Locks and Canals on Connecticut River under a charter granted on February 23, 1792, by the Massachusetts legislature and Governor John Hancock. After completing the South Hadley Canal, many of the earlier Proprietors turned their attention to extending navigation to regions above Turners Falls.

Construction work included a log-crib dam extending across the Connecticut River at a place called "Great Falls" (now Turners Falls), a canal 2.5 miles (4 kilometres) long and 20 feet (6 metres) wide from there to a point downstream near the Deerfield River, and a towpath on its east shore. The canal had ten locks as finally completed. Upstream a dam and single-lock canal near the mouth of the Millers River allowed barges to bypass the French King rapids. The canals were opened for business in 1798 and by 1802 supported regular freight traffic by boat from Long Island Sound to Bellows Falls, Vermont.

The canal was profitable for 30 years, returning 4% dividend to its investors, and even in 1826 briefly considered as part of a larger system from Boston to the Hudson River, but within a few decades railroads had become the favored means of transport, and it eventually closed to navigation in 1856. However, in 1869 it was reconstructed, along with the Turner Falls Dam, to provide waterpower for both existing and newly planned mills. This reconstructed power canal followed a somewhat different route from its predecessor, and served as the origin of today's village of Turners Falls.
