= Express company =

- Industry: business services
- Founder: William F. Harnden
- Headquarters: New York
- Area served: United States
- Products: merchandise
- Services: delivery

An express company is a business developed in the United States which provides for the speedy transmission of parcels or merchandise of any kind and their safe delivery in good condition. “Collect on delivery” service is also featured, the express company making the collecting and forwarding “returns” to the shipper. Money orders also are issued, payable at any of the numerous offices throughout the United States.

== History ==
Express service had its beginnings in the trip made from Boston to New York by William F. Harnden (1813-45), the first “express-package carrier,” on March 4, 1839. The plan recommending itself to businessmen, competing companies sprang up rapidly, and express lines were established in all directions. Adams & Company's California express was started in 1849; Wells Fargo & Company's in 1852; the American-European Company in 1855. As railroads extended, the early “pony express” disappeared, and individual companies made contracts with the railroad companies, their business over these routes being held to be entitled to the protection of the courts against any efforts to dispossess them. Many of the rival companies united, and now are joint-stock institutions, employing capital amounting to over $50,000,000.
