= South Hadley Canal =

Coordinates: 42°13′15″N 72°36′33″W

- South Hadley Canal Historic District
- U.S. National Register of Historic Places
- U.S. Historic district
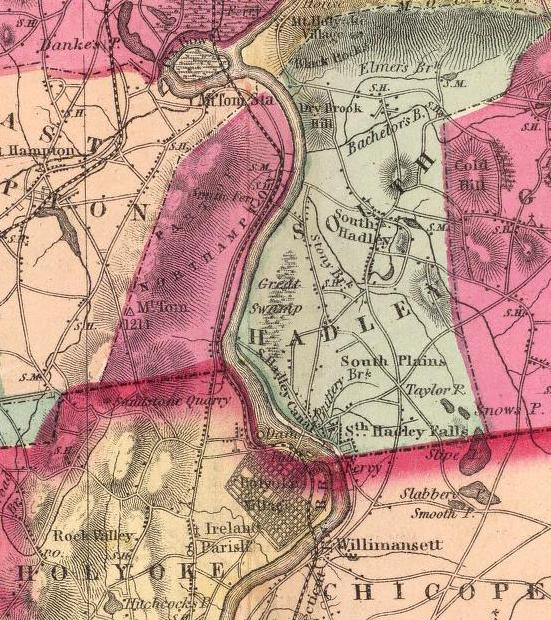
- Map of the canal

- Location within Massachusetts Location within the United States
- Nearest city: South Hadley, Massachusetts
- NRHP reference No.: 92000077
- Added to NRHP: March 11, 1992

The South Hadley Canal was a canal along the Connecticut River in South Hadley, Massachusetts. It was the earliest navigable canal in the United States, with operation commencing in 1795. It has been listed on the National Register of Historic Places as the South Hadley Canal Historic District.

The canal dates to February 1792, when leading citizens of western Massachusetts proposed to build a canal around the Great Falls at South Hadley, a 53-foot (16 m) drop in the Connecticut River that blocked boat transport. At that time, all cargo needed to be unloaded for 2.5 miles (4.0 km) of land transport around the falls, driving river transport cost for a bushel of wheat from Northampton, Massachusetts, to Windsor, Connecticut, to more than double its transport costs by sea from Hartford to Boston. John Hancock, then Governor of Massachusetts, signed the charter which incorporated the Proprietors of the Locks and Canals on the Connecticut River. Their corporate seal bore the motto "SIC TRANSIT - Public & Private Good".

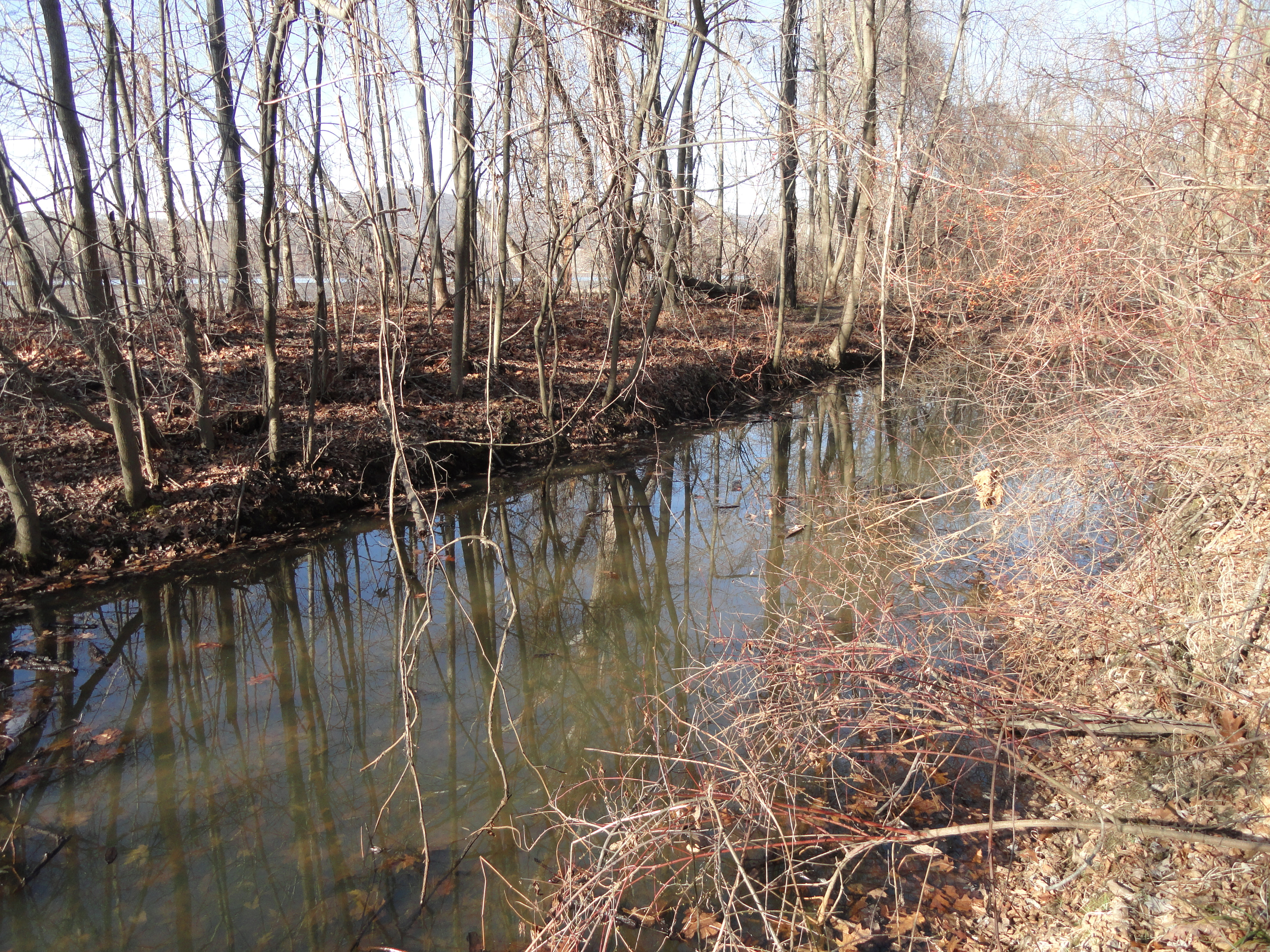
Remnant of the canal

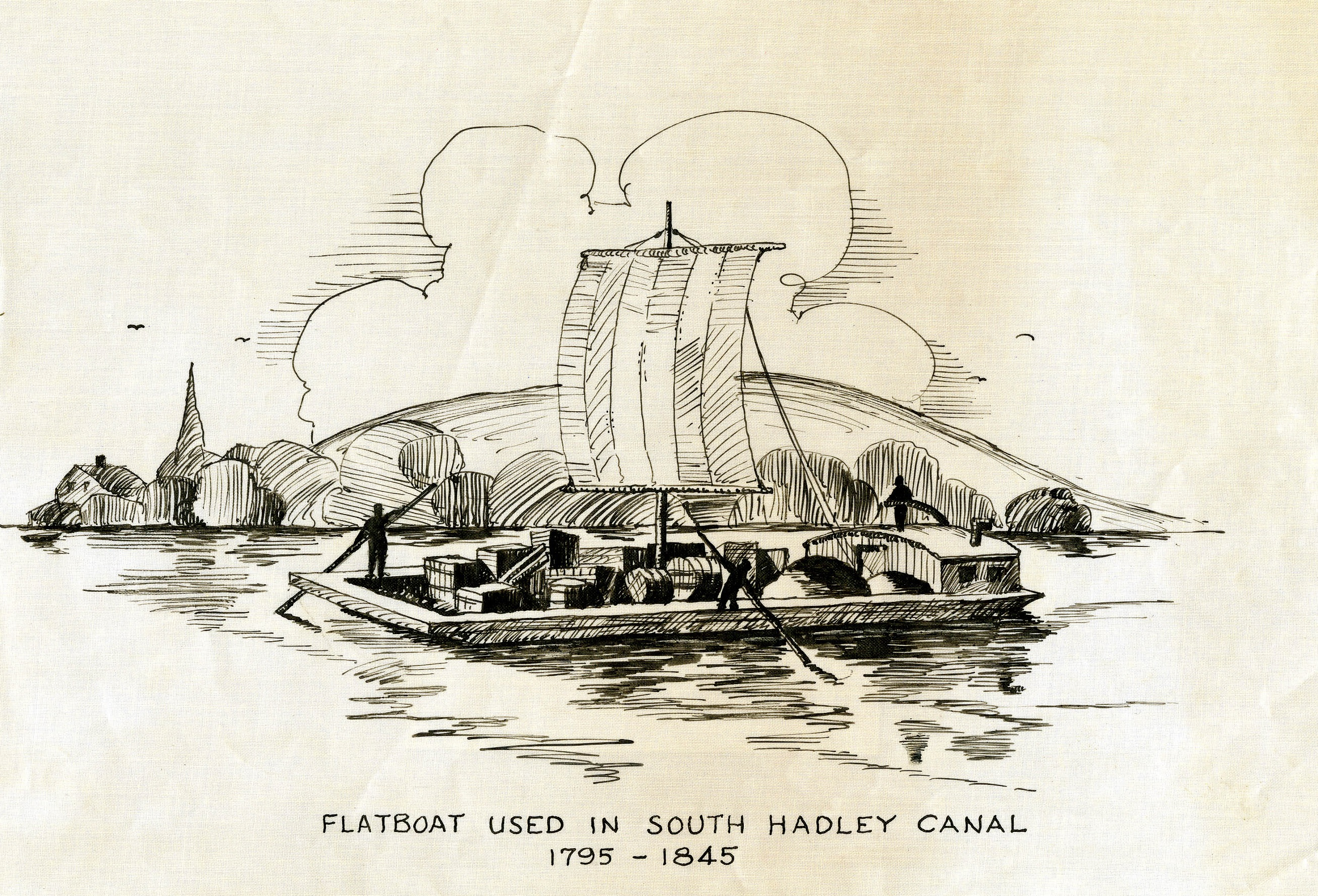
A flatboat typical of those used to haul freight through the canal. Drawing by Kenneth L. Williamson.

Seal of the Proprietors of Locks & Canals of the County of Hampshire, Mass.

Funds were raised both locally and internationally, with four Dutch investment houses owning slightly over 50% of the stock. The canal was built by some 240 local workers. In April 1795 it opened to commercial traffic. (Nearby Turners Falls Canal opened three years later.) First year revenue came to $3,109 at 75 cents per ton. By 1816 tolls had grown to over $16,000. In 1826 the Barnet, the first steamboat to operate on the Connecticut River, passed through the South Hadley Canal on its way to Vermont. However, by 1843 competing railroads had begun to erode income, and the canal closed as uneconomical in 1862.

Rather than use locks, the canal was built with an unusual "inclined plane" to transport 20-foot (6.1 m) by 60-foot (18 m) flatboats over the falls. The inclined plane appears to have been pioneered on England's Ketley Canal in 1788. This was its first use in American canals, and served as a pattern for others including the Morris Canal in New Jersey.

On the South Hadley Canal's inclined plane, the boat was first maneuvered into a special cart, then hauled up or down a ramp built of solid stone, 275 feet (84 m) long by 30 feet (9.1 m) wide, covered with strong wood planks, and having a slope of 13.5 degrees. Lifting power was supplied by two overshot waterwheels 16 feet (4.9 m) in diameter, one on each side of the inclined plane, connected to the cart with chains. The cart had unequal wheel sizes to keep the boat level during transport. Total transport time was about 15 minutes. In 1805, after about 10 years of use, however, the inclined plane was replaced by a series of five locks when it was necessary to deepen the canal.

Today The Bicentennial Canal Park serves as a historic memorial, preserving the historical remnants of the canal. The overlook deck provides vistas of the Mount Tom Range and the Connecticut River. Holyoke Gas & Electric maintains Texon Park, Lower Riverside Park, and Gatehouse Park along the Holyoke dam. Lower Riverside Park overlooks the site of the former inclined plane and lock system, remnants of which are still visible today.

== See also ==
- Holyoke Canal System
- Farmington Canal
- National Register of Historic Places listings in Hampshire County, Massachusetts
- South Hadley, Massachusetts
