= Board of Engineers for Internal Improvements =

U.S. War Department board for internal-improvements surveys (1824–1831)

- Formation: May 31, 1824; 201 years ago
- Dissolved: 1831
- Type: Government engineering board
- Purpose: Planning and supervising surveys for national internal improvements
- Headquarters: Washington, D.C., U.S.
- Key people: Gen. Simon Bernard, Col. Joseph G. Totten, John L. Sullivan
- Parent organization: United States Department of War

The Board of Engineers for Internal Improvements was a War Department board, organized following passage of the General Survey Act, to plan and supervise federally directed surveys for roads, canals, and related works of national importance. Organized on May 31, 1824, the Board coordinated survey brigades, prepared plans and estimates, and advised on route selection. The Act did not authorize the engineer's support of construction. Under department policy, officers detailed to projects were generally limited to the survey phase—construction work typically required resignation, and in 1838, Congress barred Army engineers from serving with private companies. The Board’s activities waned after 1829; by 1831, its functions were absorbed by the Topographical service. In 1838, Congress organized the Corps of Topographical Engineers as a separate bureau.

Operating within the War Department, the Board’s membership centered on Engineer Department officers, with civilian assistance; Topographical officers led field brigades. It developed and supervised surveys, plans, and estimates for roads, canals, and river navigation, and, by administrative instruction, sometimes directed comparative studies that included railway alternatives when evaluating "roads." The Board’s methods and staffing were precursors to later federal civil-works practice and national infrastructure planning.

== Background ==
Calls for coordinated federal surveys intensified after the War of 1812. Congress enacted the General Survey Act on April 30, 1824, authorizing the President to employ Army engineers to survey routes for roads and canals of national importance. The War Department organized the Board on May 31, 1824, to implement the program, standardize methods, prioritize projects, and supervise field brigades.

== Composition and leadership ==
The Board’s core membership included Gen. Simon Bernard and Col. Joseph G. Totten of the Engineer Department, with civilian engineer John L. Sullivan contributing to planning and visualization. Officers of the Topographical service (e.g., John J. Abert, James Kearney, William G. McNeill) led survey brigades under Board direction. Several members also served on the Board of Fortifications, leading to periodic overlap in personnel and methods.

== Functions and activities ==
The Board reviewed survey requests from Congress and the states, assigned Army engineer brigades, and approved route recommendations with preliminary plans and cost estimates. Departmental instructions sometimes directed comparative studies (e.g., canal versus railway) when evaluating "roads." Between 1824 and the mid-1830s, the Engineer and Topographical service completed numerous canal, road, and river surveys, including work on the Chesapeake and Ohio Canal and other interstate routes; contemporaneous summaries for the Corps report about 120 surveys (1824–1837) and assistance on roughly 90 projects.

Per War Department policy and the Act's scope, officers detailed under the program were generally limited to initial surveys, plans, and estimates; participation in construction normally required resignation of the Army commission. Limited exceptions in the late 1820s–1830s involved long-term furloughs to work on railroad construction, but the department increasingly discouraged such detached service, and in 1838 Congress barred Army engineers from serving with private companies.

== Notable surveys and projects ==
- Chesapeake and Ohio Canal (1824–): Early Board priority under the Act; Army engineers organized route examinations and estimates for a Potomac–Cumberland line.
- Roanoke–James–Kanawha corridor (1826): Under War Department instructions to the Board of Engineers, officers examined whether a canal or a railway would better connect the waters along this corridor—a comparative study undertaken within the Act's survey program. The statute itself named only "roads and canals"; treating railways as a form of "road" in such surveys reflected administrative practice, not a change to the law.
- Detroit–Fort Dearborn military road (Chicago Road): Congress appropriated funds to survey a road between Detroit and Chicago and, by act of March 3, 1825, authorized its survey and opening (4 Stat. 135). Contemporary Michigan references also note a 1824 congressional appropriation "for a survey of the Great Sauk Trail (now U.S. 12)" with an additional appropriation in 1825. Commerce and the mail soon traveled much faster on what was called the Chicago Road.
- Baltimore and Ohio Railroad assistance (1827–1830): On military grounds, War Secretary James Barbour detailed Army Engineer and Topographical officers to the railroad to help survey and organize the line.
- Morris Canal: Army engineer assistance began in August 1823 under Chief Engineer Alexander Macomb; after the Act (1824) the Board consulted on the line under the federal survey program, with Gen. Simon Bernard and Col. Joseph G. Totten reporting on cost, traffic, and operating arrangements.
- Delaware and Raritan Canal: An 1824 state survey concluded the Assunpink/Millstone summit needed additional water and accepted a recommendation of the Board of Engineers for Internal Improvements to supply it via a Delaware River feeder.
- Western and Atlantic Railroad (Georgia): State-owned line chartered in 1836; Lt. Col. Stephen H. Long (Topographical Engineers) served as chief engineer and directed the 1837 route surveys and mapping. This assistance post‑dated the Board’s active period and was carried out under the War Department’s Topographical service rather than the Board.
- Indiana internal improvements (1830s): Board-directed and later Topographical-service assistance for preliminary surveys, plans, and estimates associated with the Wabash–Erie system and related works; example documents include the Report of the Engineer on the Michigan and Wabash Canal (Dec. 15, 1835) and the Report of the Principal Engineer to the State Board of Internal Improvement (Dec. 5, 1837).
- Massachusetts railroads (1830s; representative): early state and company engineer reports on surveys and locations for lines such as the Eastern Railroad.

Contemporaneous summaries for the Army report about 120 surveys (1824–1837) and assistance on roughly 90 projects, undertaken by the Engineer and Topographical services under the Act’s program. Some of the earliest federal surveys for railroads were also initiated under Board supervision.

== 1825 report ==
In February 1825, the Board submitted its first major report to Congress, transmitted by President Monroe. The report outlined a framework for a national system of internal improvements and included route surveys, preliminary estimates, and policy recommendations; an engraved map by John L. Sullivan accompanied the text.

== Legacy and dissolution ==
Political opposition to loaning Army officers to non-federal works and to extra-compensation practices curtailed the Board’s operations after 1829. By 1831 its functions were absorbed by the Topographical Bureau; federal survey work continued, and in 1838 Congress organized the Corps of Topographical Engineers as a separate bureau under John J. Abert.

Projects influenced by Board-directed surveys included the examples above and additional canals and railroads in Massachusetts, Indiana, and Georgia. The Board’s survey methods helped standardize route selection, economic justification, and engineering documentation later adopted widely in the 1830s–1840s.

== See also ==
- United States Army Corps of Engineers
- General Survey Act
- Topographical Bureau
- John Quincy Adams
