= Report on Roads and Canals =

1808 report proposing a network of roads and canals in the US

The Report on Roads and Canals was a document prepared by Albert Gallatin, Secretary of the Treasury, in response to a U.S. Senate resolution in 1807. Submitted in 1808, the report proposed an extensive plan for a network of roads and canals across the United States, purportedly aimed at improving commerce, unifying the country, and enhancing national security. Gallatin's report is one of the earliest comprehensive federal infrastructure plans in American history, outlining projects that would influence later developments in national transportation policy.

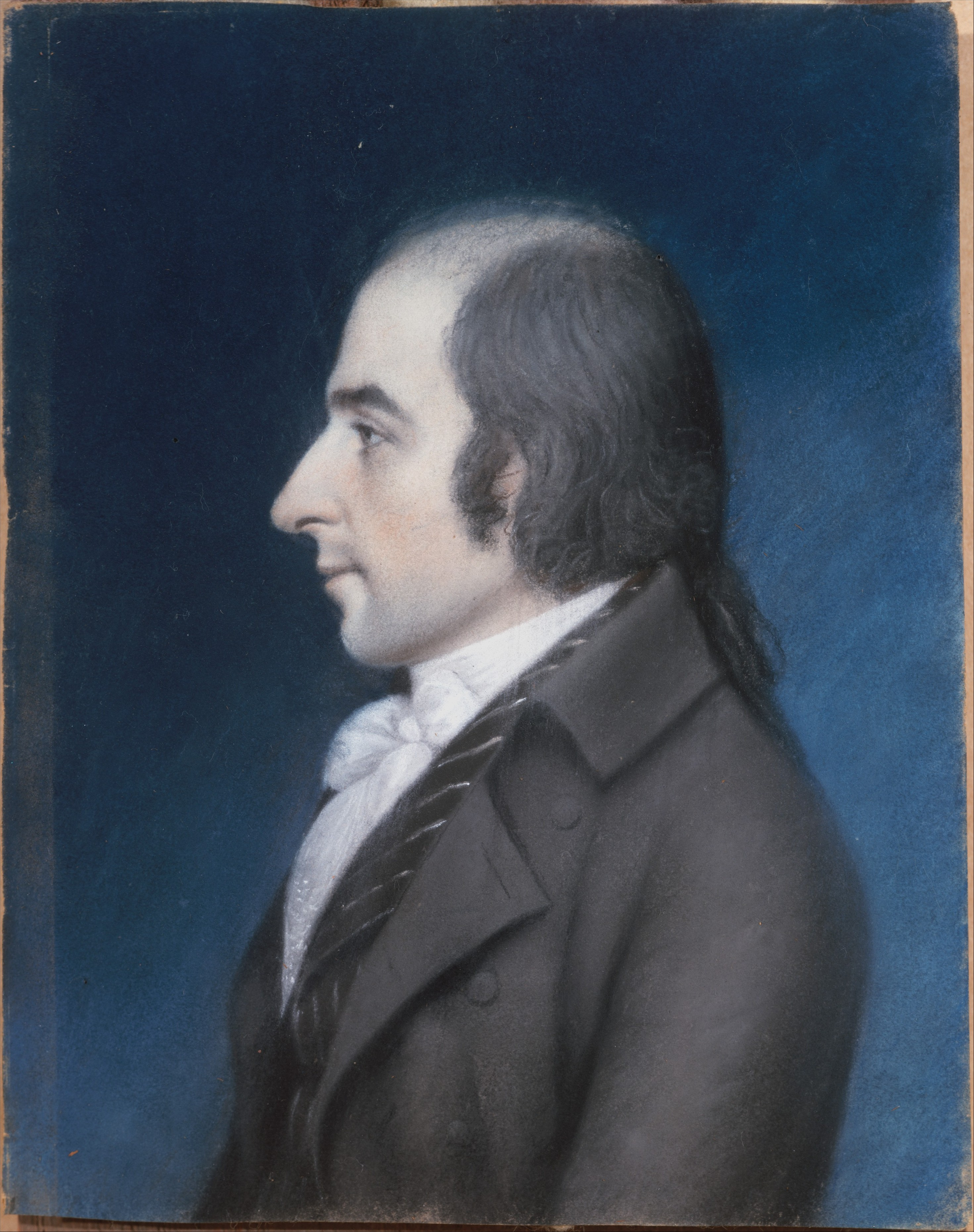
Albert Gallatin

Gallatin advocated for a $20 million investment to construct roads and canals that would enhance national commerce, connect seaports to interior regions, and promote westward expansion. Key recommendations included canals through Cape Cod, the Delmarva Peninsula, and the Great Dismal Swamp; a road spanning from Maine to Georgia; and a series of waterways linking the Hudson River to the Great Lakes. Although cost concerns, fierce partisan debate in Congress, and escalating tensions with Britain prevented Congress from fully adopting the plan, funding was secured for the National Road.

== Background ==
In the early 19th century, the United States had just purchased Louisiana from French emperor, Napoleon and had almost doubled its territory, but faced challenges in transportation and infrastructure. At this time, most of the nation's roads were unpaved, narrow, and poorly maintained, while water transport—primarily along rivers and the coast—was limited to a few navigable routes.

Albert Gallatin, the secretary of the treasury under President Thomas Jefferson, was directed by the Senate in 1807 to evaluate the country's transportation needs and propose a comprehensive plan. His Report on the Subject of Public Roads and Canals, presented in 1808, proposed a network of federally funded roads and canals that would connect the eastern states to the expanding western territories. Gallatin's report recommended that the federal government, rather than state or private interests alone, assume responsibility for these large-scale improvements to overcome the financial and logistical constraints faced by individual states and private companies.

The proposal, however, sparked political debate. Anti-Federalists opposed the idea of federal funding for interstate improvements and argued that the Constitution did not grant the federal government authority to build roads and canals, and they feared that such power would infringe on states' rights and increase federal influence.

== Report ==
Responding to a Senate resolution, the report outlined a system of roads and canals intended to improve internal commerce, reduce travel costs, enhance national unity and in the case of an invasion of the United States. Gallatin divided his proposals into geographic and functional categories, prioritizing areas where transportation improvements would provide the greatest economic and strategic benefits. He stressed that infrastructure should connect major rivers, seaports, and commercial hubs to the western territories, ensuring that resources and markets were accessible across the United States. His recommendations included both specific projects and broader suggestions for linking the country's regions.

For the Atlantic seaboard, Gallatin suggested a series of coastal canals to create an inland navigation route, including the Chesapeake and Delaware Canal to link the Chesapeake Bay and Delaware River, and a canal in New Jersey to connect the Raritan and Delaware Rivers to facilitate trade between Philadelphia and New York.

The report also emphasised the importance of inland canals to connect the eastern and western parts of the country. Gallatin proposed a Potomac-Ohio Canal to link the Potomac River with the Ohio River, creating a continuous route to the western territories, as well as a Hudson-Champlain Canal to connect the Hudson River with Lake Champlain, facilitating trade between New York State and Canada. Gallatin argued that the proposed improvements would reduce shipping costs, increase the availability of goods, and stimulate economic growth in rural and frontier regions.

== Reception ==
The Report was received with mixed reactions in Congress and among the public. Proponents, primarily Federalists and some Jeffersonian Republicans, praised the report for its comprehensive vision and its potential to unify the young nation through improved infrastructure. They argued that the proposed roads and canals would enhance commerce, reduce transportation costs, and strengthen national defense, aligning with broader goals of economic development and westward expansion.

However, the report faced significant opposition. Anti-Federalists and strict constructionists questioned the constitutionality of federal funding for internal improvements, arguing that such projects should remain under state or private jurisdiction. They feared federal overreach and centralization, concerns rooted in the ideological debates of the time regarding the role of the federal government in shaping the economy. Additionally, sectional interests played a role; representatives from regions that stood to benefit less from the proposed projects were more likely to oppose the plan.

Cost was another source of contention. Gallatin estimated the total expense of the projects at over $20 million—a significant sum in the early 19th century. Many lawmakers were concerned about the financial strain this would place on the federal budget and potential increases in taxation.

These objections ultimately prevented the immediate implementation of the report's recommendations. Despite the lack of immediate action, Gallatin's report had a lasting influence on American infrastructure policy. It inspired subsequent projects, such as the Cumberland (National) Road and the Erie Canal.
