= Albert Gallatin =

American politician, diplomat, and scholar (1761–1849)

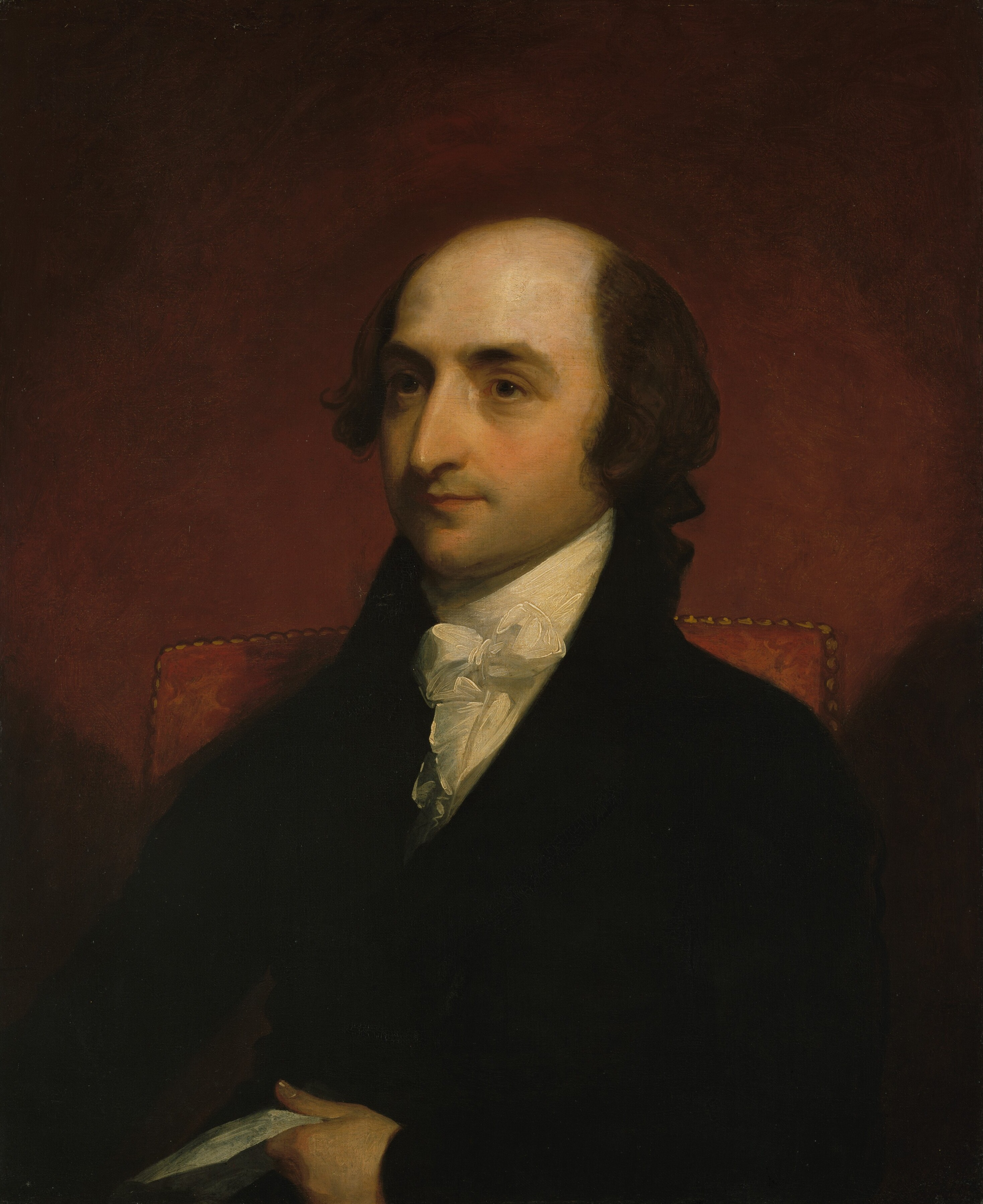
- Portrait by Gilbert Stuart, c. 1803

10th United States Minister to the United Kingdom
- In office September 1, 1826 – October 4, 1827
- President: John Quincy Adams
- Preceded by: Rufus King
- Succeeded by: William Beach Lawrence (acting)

11th United States Minister to France
- In office July 16, 1816 – May 16, 1823
- President: James Madison; James Monroe
- Preceded by: William H. Crawford
- Succeeded by: James Brown

4th United States Secretary of the Treasury
- In office May 14, 1801 – February 8, 1814 (Note: William Jones served as Acting Secretary from May 9, 1813 to February 8, 1814.)
- President: Thomas Jefferson; James Madison
- Preceded by: Samuel Dexter
- Succeeded by: George W. Campbell

Member of the U.S. House of Representatives from Pennsylvania's 12th district
- In office March 4, 1795 – March 3, 1801
- Preceded by: William Findley
- Succeeded by: William Hoge

United States Senator from Pennsylvania
- In office December 2, 1793 – February 28, 1794
- Preceded by: William Maclay
- Succeeded by: James Ross

Member of the Pennsylvania House of Representatives
- In office 1790–1792

Personal details
- Born: Abraham Alfonse Albert Gallatin; January 29, 1761 Geneva, Republic of Geneva (now Switzerland)
- Died: August 12, 1849 (aged 88) Astoria, New York, U.S.
- Resting place: Trinity Church Cemetery
- Party: Democratic-Republican
- Spouse: Sophia Allegre (m. 1789; died 1789) Hannah Nicholson (m. 1793; died 1849)
- Children: 6
- Education: University of Geneva

Abraham Alfonse Albert Gallatin (January 29, 1761 – August 12, 1849) was a Genevan-American politician, diplomat, ethnologist, and linguist. Often described as "America's Swiss Founding Father", he was a leading figure in the early years of the United States, helping shape the new republic's financial system and foreign policy. Gallatin was a prominent member of the Democratic-Republican Party, represented Pennsylvania in both chambers of Congress, and held several influential roles across four presidencies, most notably as the longest serving U.S. secretary of the treasury. He is also known for his contributions to academia, namely as the founder of New York University and cofounder of the American Ethnological Society.

Gallatin was born in Geneva in present-day Switzerland and spoke French as a first language. Inspired by the ideals of the American Revolution, he immigrated to the United States in the 1780s, settling in western Pennsylvania. He served as a delegate to the 1789 Pennsylvania Constitutional Convention and won election to the Pennsylvania General Assembly. Gallatin was elected to the U.S. Senate in 1793, emerging as a leading Anti-Federalist and opponent of Alexander Hamilton's economic policies. However, he was soon removed from office on a party-line vote due to not meeting requisite citizenship requirements; returning to Pennsylvania, Gallatin helped calm many angry farmers during the Whiskey Rebellion.

Gallatin won election to the U.S. House of Representatives in 1795, where he helped establish the House Ways and Means Committee. He became the chief spokesman on financial matters for the Democratic-Republican Party and led opposition to the Federalist economic program. Gallatin helped Thomas Jefferson prevail in the contentious 1800 U.S. presidential election, and his reputation as a prudent financial manager led to his appointment as Treasury Secretary. Under Jefferson, Gallatin reduced government spending, instituted checks and balances for government expenditures, and financed the Louisiana Purchase and advocated for internal improvements, most notably through his Report on Roads and Canals. He retained his position through James Madison's administration until February 1814, maintaining much of Hamilton's financial system while presiding over a reduction in the national debt. Gallatin served on the American commission that agreed to the Treaty of Ghent, which ended the War of 1812. In the aftermath of the war, he helped found the Second Bank of the United States.

Declining another term at the Treasury, Gallatin served as U.S. Ambassador to France from 1816 to 1823, struggling with scant success to improve relations during the Bourbon Restoration. In the 1824 U.S. presidential election, Gallatin was nominated for Vice President by the Democratic-Republican Congressional caucus but never wanted the position and ultimately withdrew due to a lack of popular support. In 1826 and 1827, he served as the American ambassador to Britain and negotiated several agreements, such as a ten-year extension of the joint occupation of Oregon Country. He thereafter retired from politics and dedicated the rest of his life to various civic, humanitarian, and academic causes. He became the first president of the New York branch of the National Bank from 1831 to 1839, and in 1842 joined John Russell Bartlett to establish the American Ethnological Society; his studies of Indigenous languages of North America have earned him the moniker "father of American ethnology." Gallatin remained active in public life as an outspoken opponent of slavery and an advocate for fiscal responsibility, free trade, and individual liberty.

== Early life ==
Gallatin's coat of arms

Gallatin was born on January 29, 1761, in Geneva, and was until 1785 a citizen of the Republic of Geneva. His parents were the wealthy Jean Gallatin and his wife Sophie Albertine Rollaz. Gallatin's family had great influence in the Republic of Geneva, and many family members held distinguished positions in the magistracy and the army. Jean Gallatin, a prosperous merchant, died in 1765, followed by Sophie in April 1770. Now orphaned, Gallatin was taken into the care of Mademoiselle Pictet, a family friend and distant relative of Gallatin's father. In January 1773, Gallatin was sent to study at the elite Academy of Geneva. While attending the academy, Gallatin read deeply the philosophy of Jean-Jacques Rousseau and Voltaire, along with the French Physiocrats; he became dissatisfied with the traditionalism of Geneva. A student of the Enlightenment, he believed in the nobility of human nature and that when freed from social restrictions, it would display admirable qualities and greater results in both the physical and the moral world. The democratic spirit of the United States attracted him and he decided to emigrate.

In April 1780, Gallatin secretly left Geneva with his classmate Henri Serre. Carrying letters of recommendation from eminent Americans (including Benjamin Franklin) that the Gallatin family procured, the young men left France in May, sailing on an American ship, "the Kattie". They reached Cape Ann on July 14 and arrived in Boston the next day, traveling the intervening thirty miles by horseback. Bored with monotonous Bostonian life, Gallatin and Serre set sail with a Swiss female companion to the settlement of Machias, located on the northeastern tip of the Maine frontier. At Machias, Gallatin operated a bartering venture, in which he dealt with a variety of goods and supplies. He enjoyed the simple life and the natural environment surrounding him. Gallatin and Serre returned to Boston in October 1781 after abandoning their bartering venture in Machias. Friends of Pictet, who had learned that Gallatin had traveled to the United States, convinced Harvard College to employ Gallatin as a French tutor.

Gallatin disliked living in New England, instead preferring to become a farmer in the Trans-Appalachian West, which at that point was the frontier of American settlement. He became the interpreter and business partner of a French land speculator, Jean Savary, and traveled throughout various parts of the United States in order to purchase undeveloped Western lands. In 1785, he became an American citizen after he swore allegiance to the state of Virginia, fulfilling the requirements of citizenship as established under Article IV of the Articles of Confederation. Gallatin inherited a significant sum of money the following year, and he used that money to purchase a 400-acre plot of land in Fayette County, Pennsylvania. He built a stone house named Friendship Hill on the new property. Gallatin co-founded a company designed to attract Swiss settlers to the United States, but the company proved unable to attract many settlers.

== Marriage and family ==
In 1789, Gallatin married Sophie Allègre, the daughter of a Richmond boardinghouse owner, but Allègre died just five months into the marriage. He was in mourning for a number of years and seriously considered returning to Geneva. However, on November 1, 1793, he married Hannah Nicholson, daughter of the well-connected Commodore James Nicholson. They had two sons and four daughters: Catherine, Sophia Albertine, Hannah Maria, Frances, James, and Albert Rolaz Gallatin. Catherine died of whooping cough and the measles before she was eight months old, Sophia and Hannah also died as infants. Gallatin's marriage proved to be politically and economically advantageous, as the Nicholsons enjoyed connections in New York, Georgia, and Maryland. With most of his business ventures unsuccessful, Gallatin sold much of his land, excluding Friendship Hill, to Robert Morris; he and his wife would instead live in Philadelphia and other coastal cities for most of the rest of their lives.

== Early political career ==
=== Pennsylvania legislature and United States Senate ===
In 1788, Gallatin was elected as a delegate to a state convention to discuss possible revisions to the United States Constitution. In the next two years, he served as a delegate to a state constitutional convention. He won election to the Pennsylvania House of Representatives and served from 1790 to 1792. As a public official, he aligned with Anti-Federalists and spent much of his time in the state and national capital of Philadelphia. His service on the Ways and Means Committee earned him a strong reputation as an expert in finance and taxation.

Gallatin won election to the United States Senate in early 1793, and he took his seat in December of that year. He quickly emerged as a prominent opponent of Alexander Hamilton's economic program but was declared ineligible for a seat in the Senate in February 1794 because he had not been a citizen for the required nine years prior to election. The dispute itself had important ramifications. At the time, the Senate held closed sessions. However, with the American Revolution only a decade ended, the senators were leery of anything which might hint that they intended to establish an aristocracy, so they opened up their chamber for the first time for the debate over whether to unseat Gallatin. Soon after, open sessions became standard procedure for the Senate. Gallatin was one of two senators to vote against the Eleventh Amendment to the United States Constitution.

=== Whiskey Rebellion ===
Gallatin had strongly opposed the 1791 establishment of an excise tax on whiskey, as whiskey trade and production constituted an important part of the Western economy. In 1794, after Gallatin had been removed from the Senate and returned to Friendship Hill, the Whiskey Rebellion broke out among disgruntled farmers opposed to the federal collection of the whiskey tax. Gallatin did not join in the rebellion, but criticized the military response of the President George Washington's administration as an overreaction. Gallatin helped persuade many of the angered farmers to end the rebellion, urging them to accept that "if any one part of the Union are suffered to oppose by force the determination of the whole, there is an end to government itself and of course to the Union." The rebellion collapsed as the army moved near.

=== House of Representatives ===
Drawing by James Sharples, c. 1796

In the aftermath of the Whiskey Rebellion, Gallatin won election to the United States House of Representatives, taking his seat in March 1795. Upon his return to Congress, Gallatin became the leading financial expert of the Democratic-Republican Party. In 1796, Gallatin published A Sketch on the Finances of the United States, which discussed the operations of the Treasury Department and strongly attacked the Federalist Party's financial program. Some historians and biographers believe that Gallatin founded the House Ways and Means Committee in order to check Hamilton's influence over financial issues, but historian Patrick Furlong argues that Hamilton's Federalist allies were actually responsible for founding the committee. After James Madison declined to seek re-election in 1796, Gallatin emerged as the Democratic-Republican leader in the House of Representatives. During the Quasi-War with France, Gallatin criticized military expenditures and opposed passage of the Alien and Sedition Acts. In the contingent election that decided the outcome of the 1800 presidential election, Gallatin helped Thomas Jefferson secure victory over his ostensible running mate, Aaron Burr.

== Secretary of the Treasury ==
=== Jefferson administration ===
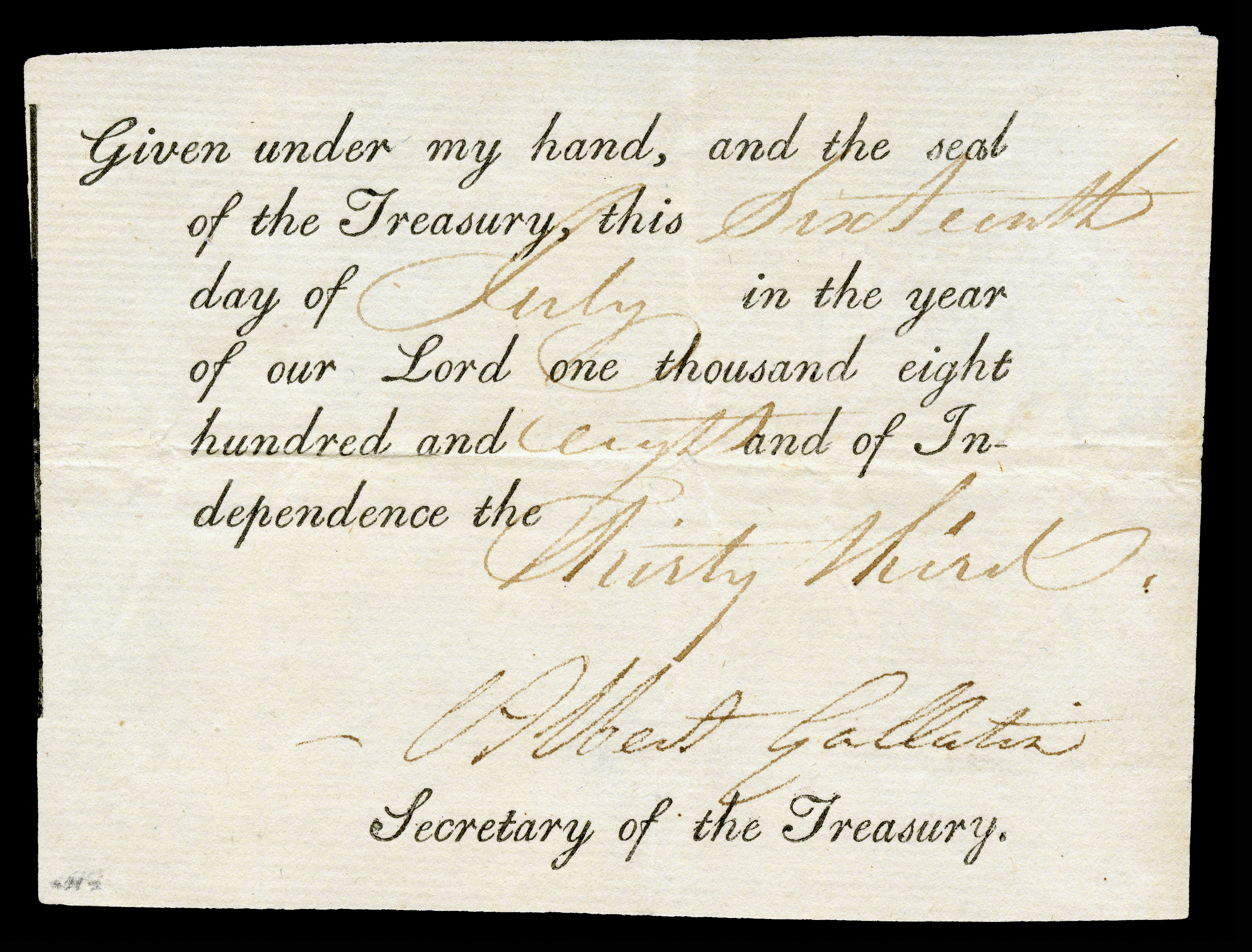
Albert Gallatin, signature

Gallatin's mastery of public finance made him the obvious choice as Jefferson's Secretary of the Treasury; as Jefferson put it, Gallatin was "the only man in the United States who understands, through all the labyrinths Hamilton involved it, the precise state of the Treasury." Gallatin received a recess appointment in May 1801 and was confirmed by the Senate in January 1802. Along with Secretary of State Madison and Jefferson himself, Gallatin became one of the three key officials in the Jefferson administration. As Jefferson and Madison spent the majority of the summer months at their respective estates, Gallatin was frequently left to preside over the operations of the federal government. He also acted as a moderating force on Jefferson's speeches and policies, in one case convincing Jefferson to refrain from calling for the abolition of the General Welfare Clause.

In 1799, Gallatin made a speech advocating against normalizing relations with self-liberated slaves in the French colony of Saint-Domingue, arguing that if "they were left to govern themselves, they might become more troublesome to us, in our commerce to the West Indies, than the Algerines ever were in the Mediterranean; they might also become dangerous neighbors to the Southern States, and an asylum for renegades from those parts." In the speech, Gallatin also expressed opposition to miscegenation. Hofstra University professor Alan Singer argued based on this speech that Gallatin "was certainly not an abolitionist" and that "his claims to oppose slavery can also be read as racist attacks on the humanity of Africans, which was not uncommon among Whites during the antebellum era".

With Gallatin taking charge of fiscal policy, the new administration sought to lower taxation (though not import duties), spending, and the national debt; debt reduction in particular had long been a key goal of the party and Gallatin himself. When Gallatin took office in 1801, the national debt stood at $83 million. By 1812, the U.S. national debt had fallen to $45.2 million. One historian said of Gallatin:

His own fears of personal dependency and his small-shopkeeper's sense of integrity, both reinforced by a strain of radical republican thought that originated in England a century earlier, convinced him that public debts were a nursery of multiple public evils—corruption, legislative impotence, executive tyranny, social inequality, financial speculation, and personal indolence. Not only was it necessary to extinguish the existing debt as rapidly as possible, he argued, but Congress would have to ensure against the accumulation of future debts by more diligently supervising government expenditures.

Shortly after taking office, Gallatin worked with House Ways and Means Committee Chairman John Randolph to reduce federal spending and reduce or abolish all internal taxes, including the tax on whiskey. He presided over dramatic reductions in military spending, particularly for the United States Navy. Despite his opposition to debt, Gallatin strongly supported and arranged the financing for the Louisiana Purchase, in which the U.S. bought French Louisiana. Both Jefferson and Gallatin regarded control of the port of New Orleans, which was ceded in the purchase, as the key to the development of the Western United States. Jefferson had doubts about the constitutionality of the purchase, but Gallatin helped convince the president that a constitutional amendment authorizing the purchase was impractical and unnecessary. Gallatin also championed and helped plan the Lewis and Clark Expedition to explore lands west of the Mississippi River.

Before and after the Louisiana Purchase, Gallatin presided over a major expansion of public land sales. With the goal of selling land directly to settlers rather than to land speculators, Gallatin increased the number of federal land offices from four to eighteen. In 1812, Congress established the United States General Land Office as part of the Department of the Treasury, charging the new office with overseeing public lands. To help develop western lands, Gallatin advocated for internal improvements such as roads and canals, especially those that would connect to territories west of the Appalachian Mountains. In 1805, despite his earlier constitutional reservations, Jefferson announced his support for federally financed infrastructure projects. Three years later, Gallatin put forward his Report on Roads and Canals, in which he advocated for a $20 million federal infrastructure program. Among his proposals were canals through Cape Cod, the Delmarva Peninsula, and the Great Dismal Swamp, a road stretching from Maine to Georgia, a series of canals connecting the Hudson River with the Great Lakes, and various other canals to connect seaports like Charleston with interior regions. Resistance from many congressional Democratic-Republicans regarding cost, as well as hostilities with Britain, prevented the passage of a major infrastructure bill, but Gallatin did win funding for the construction of the National Road. The National Road linked the town of Cumberland, on the Potomac River, with the town of Wheeling, which sat on the Ohio River. Many of Gallatin's other proposals were eventually carried out years later by state and local governments, as well as private citizens.

Throughout much of Jefferson's presidency, France and Britain were engaged in the Napoleonic Wars. During Jefferson's second term, the British and French both stepped up efforts to interdict American trade with their respective enemy. A major point of contentions in Anglo-American relations was the Royal Navy's practise of impressing alleged deserters from American merchantmen, which the U.S. public saw as an affront to America's national honor. Jefferson sent James Monroe to Britain to negotiate a renewal and revision of the 1795 Jay Treaty, but Jefferson rejected the treaty that Monroe reached with the British. After the 1807 Chesapeake–Leopard affair, Jefferson proposed, over Gallatin's strong objections, what would become the Embargo Act of 1807. That act forbade all American ships from engaging in almost all foreign trade, and it remained in place until its repeal in the final days of Jefferson's presidency. Despite Gallatin's objection to the embargo, he was tasked with enforcing it against smugglers, who were able to evade the embargo in various ways. The embargo proved ineffective at accomplishing its intended purpose of punishing Britain and France, and it contributed to growing dissent in New England against the Jefferson administration. Overcoming Jefferson's declining popularity and the resentment at the embargo, Secretary of State Madison won the 1808 presidential election.

=== Madison administration ===
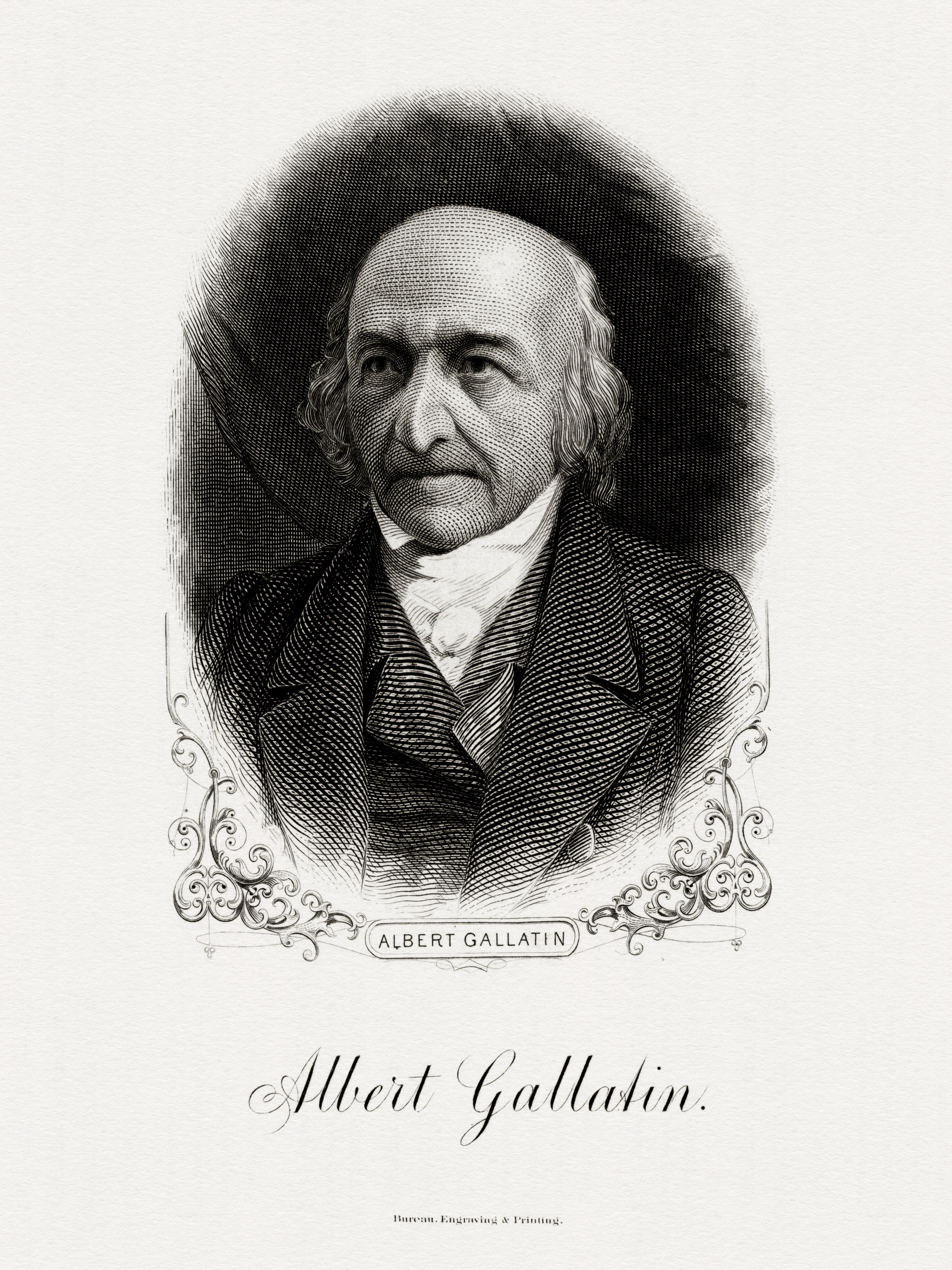
Bureau of Engraving and Printing portrait of Gallatin as Secretary of the Treasury

After taking office, Madison sought to appoint Gallatin as Secretary of State, which was generally seen as the most prestigious cabinet position. Opposition from the Senate convinced Madison to retain Gallatin as Secretary of the Treasury, and Robert Smith instead received the appointment as Secretary of State. Gallatin was deeply displeased by the appointment of Smith, and he was frequently criticized by Smith's brother, Senator Samuel Smith, as well as journalist William Duane of the influential Philadelphia Aurora. He considered resigning from government service, but Madison convinced him to stay on as a key cabinet official and adviser.

In 1810, Gallatin published Report on the Subject of Manufactures, in which he unsuccessfully urged Congress to create a $20 million federal loan program to support fledgling manufacturers. He was also unable to convince Congress to renew the charter of the First Bank of the United States (commonly known as the national bank). Although the national bank had been established as part of Hamilton's economic program, and Jefferson believed that it was "one of the most deadly hostility existing against the principles and form of our Constitution," Gallatin saw the national bank as a key part of the country's financial system. In a letter to Jefferson, Gallatin argued that the bank was indispensable because it served as a place of deposit for government funds, a source of credit, and a regulator of currency. In January 1811, the national bank was effectively abolished after the House and the Senate both defeated bills to recharter the national bank in extremely narrow votes. In response, Gallatin sent a letter to Madison, asking for permission to resign and criticizing the president for various actions, including his failure to take a strong stance on the national bank. Shortly afterwards, Madison replaced Secretary of State Smith with James Monroe, and Gallatin withdrew his resignation request.

Following the repeal of the Embargo Act of 1807, Gallatin was charged with enforcing the Non-Intercourse Act of 1809, which lifted parts of the trade embargo but still prevented American ships from engaging in trade with the British and French. In 1811, Congress replaced the Non-Intercourse Act of 1809 with a law known as Macon's Bill Number 2, which authorized the president to restore trade with either France or Britain if either promised to respect American neutrality. As with previous embargo policies pursued by the federal government under Jefferson and Madison, Macon's Bill Number 2 proved to be ineffective at halting the attacks on American shipping. In June 1812, Madison signed a declaration of war against Britain, beginning the War of 1812.

Madison ordered an invasion of Canada by relying on mostly state militias, but British forces defeated all American invasion attempts. The U.S. experienced some successes at sea, but was unable to break the British blockade. With the abolition of the national bank, the drop in import duties due to the war, and the inability or unwillingness of state banks to furnish credit, Gallatin struggled to fund the war. Reluctantly, he drafted and won passage of several new tax laws, as well as an increase in tariff rates. He also sold U.S. securities to investors, and an infusion of cash from wealthy investors Stephen Girard, John Jacob Astor, and David Parish proved critical to the financing of the war. During the War of 1812, the national debt grew dramatically, going from $45 million in early 1812 to $127 million in January 1816.

== Diplomat ==
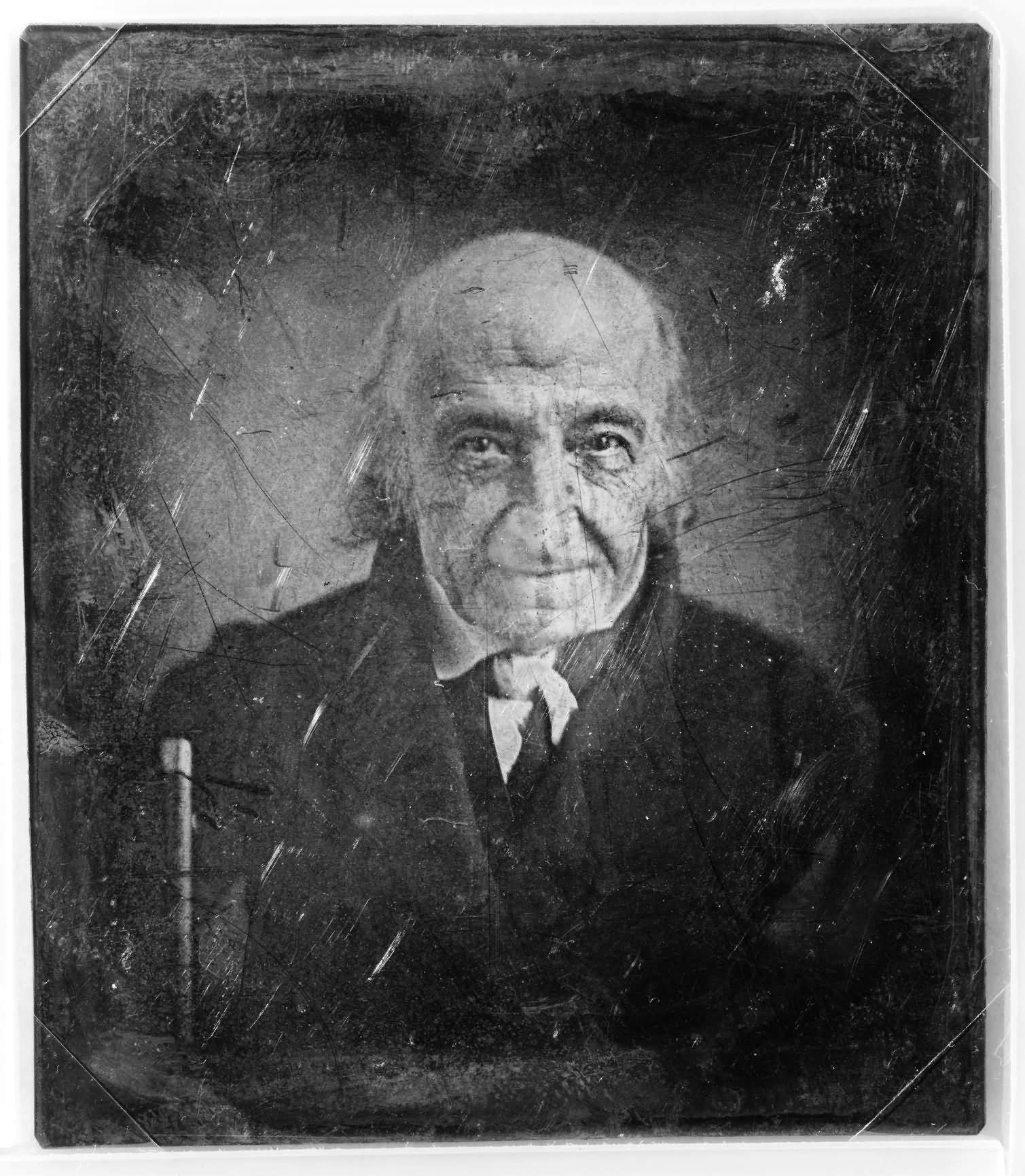
Daguerreotype of Albert Gallatin, only photograph taken of him. c. 1844–1849

In 1813, President James Madison sent Gallatin to St. Petersburg, Russia to serve as a negotiator for a peace agreement to end the War of 1812. He was one of five American commissioners who would negotiate the treaty, serving alongside Henry Clay, James Bayard, Jonathan Russell, and John Quincy Adams. Efforts at starting negotiations in Russia quickly collapsed. While waiting abroad in the hope of future negotiations, Gallatin was replaced as Secretary of the Treasury by George W. Campbell, with the expectation that Gallatin would take up his old post upon his return to the United States. Negotiations with the British finally commenced in Ghent in mid-1814.

Negotiations at Ghent lasted for four months. The British could have chosen to shift resources to North America after the abdication of Napoleon in April 1814, but, as Gallatin learned from Alexander Baring, many in Britain were tired of war. In December 1814, the two sides agreed to sign the Treaty of Ghent, which essentially represented a return to the status quo ante bellum. The treaty did not address the issue of impressment, but that issue became a moot point after the British and their allies defeated Napoleon for a final time at the June 1815 Battle of Waterloo. Gallatin's patience and skill in dealing with not only the British but also his fellow members of the American commission, including Clay and Adams, made the treaty "the special and peculiar triumph of Mr. Gallatin." John Quincy Adams, head of the American negotiating team, described Gallatin:

[H]e seldom yields to an ebullition of temper, and recovers from it immediately. He has a faculty, when discussion grows too warm, of turning off its edge by a joke, which I envy him more than all his other talents; and he has in his character one of the most extraordinary combinations of stubbornness and of flexibility that I ever met with in man. His greatest fault I think to be an ingenuity sometimes trenching upon ingenuousness.

After the end of the war, Gallatin negotiated a commercial treaty providing for a resumption of trade between the United States and Britain. Though the war with Britain had at best been a stalemate, Gallatin was pleased that it resulted in the consolidation of U.S. control over western territories, as the British largely withdrew their support from Native Americans who had sought to resist the expansion of the United States into the Great Lakes region. He also noted that "the war has laid the foundation of permanent taxes and military establishments...under our former system we were becoming too selfish, too much attached exclusively to the acquisition of wealth...[and] too much confined in our political feelings to local and State objects."

When Gallatin returned from Europe in September 1815, he declined Madison's request to take up his old post as Secretary of the Treasury. He did, however, help convince Congress to charter the Second Bank of the United States as a replacement for the defunct First Bank of the United States. Gallatin considered going into business with his longtime friend, John Jacob Astor, but ultimately he accepted appointment as ambassador to France. He served in that position from 1816 to 1823. Though he did not approve of the prevailing ideology of the Bourbon Restoration, Gallatin and his family enjoyed living in Paris. While serving as ambassador to France, he helped negotiate the Rush–Bagot Treaty and the Treaty of 1818, two treaties with Britain that settled several issues left over from the War of 1812 and established joint Anglo-American control over Oregon Country.

Upon returning to the United States, Gallatin agreed to serve as William H. Crawford's running mate in the 1824 presidential election, but later withdrew from the race at Crawford's request. Crawford had originally hoped that Gallatin's presence on the ticket would help him win the support of Pennsylvania voters, but the emergence of General Andrew Jackson as a presidential contender caused Crawford to refocus his campaign on other states. Though Gallatin had never wanted the role, he was humiliated when he was forced to withdraw from the race. He was alarmed at the possibility Jackson might win, as he saw Jackson as "an honest man and the idol of the worshippers of military glory, but from incapacity, military habits, and habitual disregard of laws and constitutional provisions, altogether unfit for the office." Ultimately, John Quincy Adams won the 1824 presidential election in a contingent election held in the House of Representatives. Gallatin and his wife returned to Friendship Hill after the presidential election, living there until 1826. That year, Gallatin accepted appointment as ambassador to Britain. After negotiating an extension of the Anglo-American control of Oregon Country, Gallatin returned to the United States in November 1827.

== Later life ==
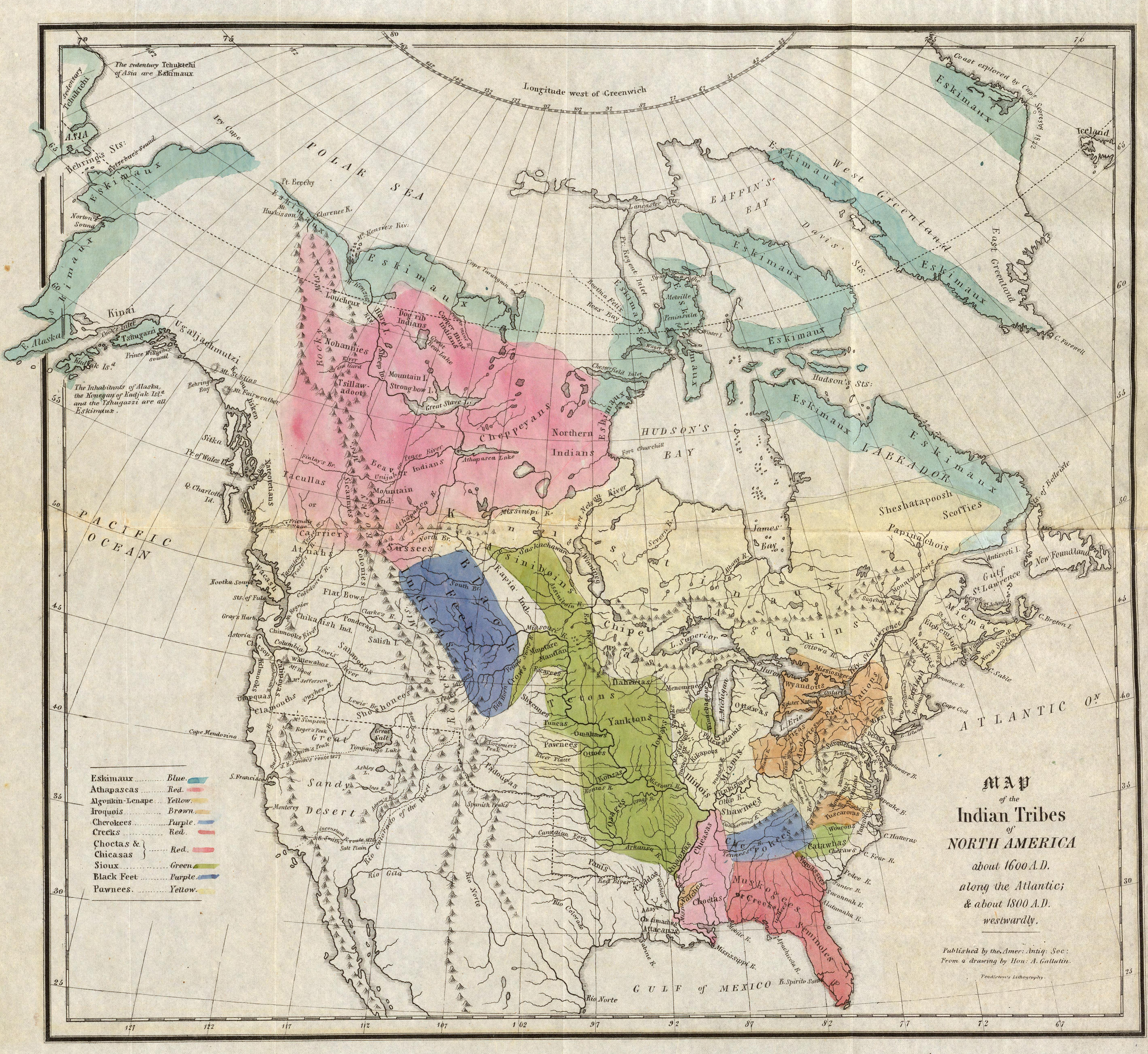
Gallatin’s map of Indian tribes in North America, published 1836).

Gallatin moved to New York City in 1828 and became president of the National Bank of New York the following year. He attempted to persuade President Jackson to recharter the Second Bank of the United States, but Jackson vetoed a recharter bill and the Second Bank lost its federal charter in 1836. In 1831, Gallatin helped found New York University, and in 1843 he was elected president of the New York Historical Society. In the mid-1840s, he opposed President James K. Polk's expansionist policies and wrote a widely-read pamphlet, Peace with Mexico, that called for an end to the Mexican–American War.

Gallatin was deeply interested in Native Americans, and he favored their assimilation into European-American culture as an alternative to forced relocation. He drew upon government contacts to research Native Americans, gathering information through Lewis Cass, explorer William Clark, and Thomas McKenney of the Bureau of Indian Affairs. Gallatin developed a personal relationship with Cherokee tribal leader John Ridge, who provided him with information on the vocabulary and the structure of the Cherokee language. Gallatin's research resulted in two published works: A Table of Indian Languages of the United States (1826) and Synopsis of the Indian Tribes of North America (1836). His research led him to conclude that the natives of North and South America were linguistically and culturally related and that their common ancestors had migrated from Asia in prehistoric times. Later research efforts included examination of the language of certain native societies in Mexico and Central America. In 1843, he co-founded the American Ethnological Society, serving as the society's first president. Due to his studies of the languages of the Native Americans, he has been called "the father of American ethnology."

The health of both Gallatin and his wife declined in the late 1840s, and Hannah died in May 1849. On Sunday, August 12, Gallatin died in Astoria, now in the Borough of Queens, New York at age 88. He is interred at Trinity Churchyard in New York City. Gallatin was the last surviving member of the Jefferson cabinet and the last surviving senator from the 18th century.

== Legacy ==
In 1791, Gallatin was elected to the American Philosophical Society. He is commemorated in the naming of a number of counties, roads, and streets, as well as through his association with New York University. The Gallatin River, named by the Lewis and Clark expedition, is one of three rivers (along with the Jefferson River and the Madison River) that converge near Three Forks, Montana to form the Missouri River. The town of Three Forks is in Gallatin County, Montana, and Montana also hosts Gallatin National Forest and Gallatin Range. Gallatin, Tennessee, the seat of Sumner County are also named for Gallatin as are Gallatin County, Illinois and Gallatin County, Kentucky. Gallatin's home of Friendship Hill is maintained by the National Park Service. A statue of Gallatin stands at the northern entrance of the Treasury Building; a statue of Hamilton stands at the building's southern entrance. The Albert Gallatin Area School District, located in southwestern Fayette County, Pennsylvania, and having contained within Gallatin's home, Friendship Hill, is also named after Gallatin. Businessman Albert Gallatin Edwards (who founded his eponymous brokerage firm in 1887 which folded into Wachovia in 2007) was named after Gallatin.

Gallatin's name is associated with NYU's Gallatin School of Individualized Study. New York University's internal course enrollment website for matriculating students is named "NYU Albert", after Gallatin. Gallatin is featured on three U.S. stamps, including one issued in 1967 with the unusual denomination of 1 1/4¢. Gallatin is also portrayed in the center of the $500 denomination set of Greenbacks (series 1862–63) currency issue.

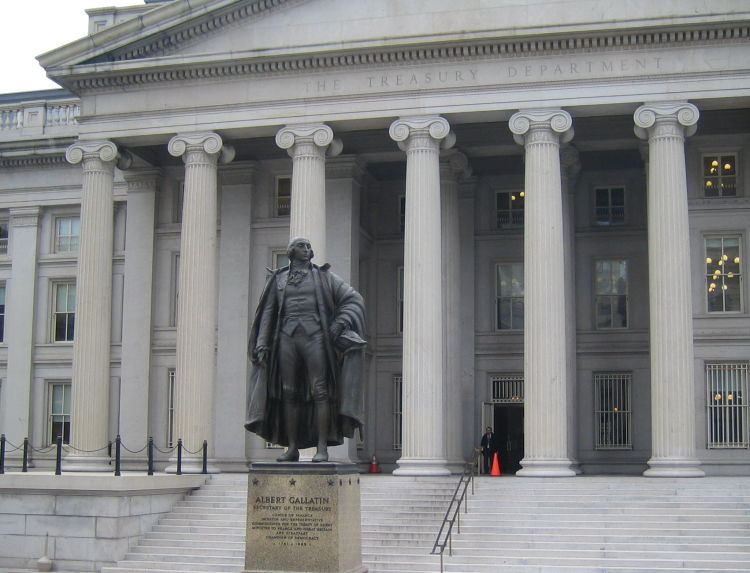
Statue of Albert Gallatin in front of the northern entrance to the United States Treasury Building

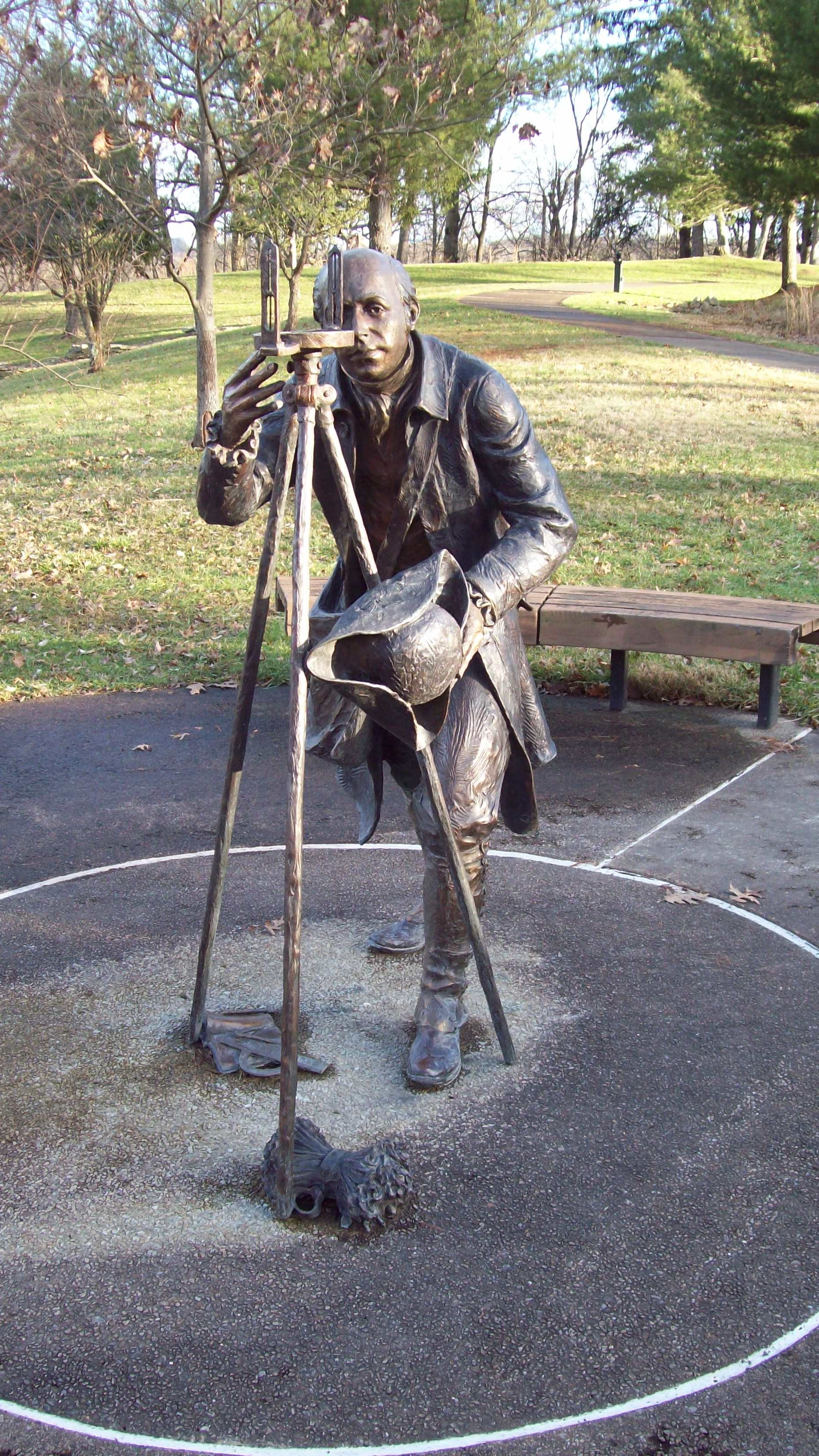
Albert Gallatin House; Friendship Hill National Historic Site

=== Self-evaluation ===
Gallatin said "far too much credit has been given me for abilities at the expense of the purity of my motives."

== See also ==
- Ferdinand Rudolph Hassler
- Gallatin National Bank
- List of foreign-born United States Cabinet members
- List of United States Cabinet members who have served more than eight years
- List of United States senators born outside the United States

== General and cited references ==
- Adams, Henry (1879). Life of Albert Gallatin. J.B. Lippincott & Co. Online edition; "Unknown"..
- Brown, Everett S. (October 1925). "The Presidential Election of 1824–1825". Political Science Quarterly. 40 (3): 384–403. doi:10.2307/2142211. hdl:2027/mdp.39015021925394. JSTOR 2142211.
- Dungan, Nicholas (2010). Gallatin: America's Swiss Founding Father. New York University Press. ISBN 978-0814721117.
- Furlong, Patrick J. (1968). "The Origins of the House Committee of Ways and Means". The William and Mary Quarterly. 25 (4): 587–604. doi:10.2307/1916799. JSTOR 1916799.
- McGraw, Thomas K. (2012). The Founders and Finance: How Hamilton, Gallatin, and Other Immigrants Forged a New Economy. Belknap Press. ISBN 9780674066922.
- Rothman, Rozann (Winter 1972). "Political Method in the Federal System: Albert Gallatin's Contribution". Publius. 1 (2): 123–141. doi:10.1093/oxfordjournals.pubjof.a037841. JSTOR 3329473.
- Stevens, John Austin (1888). Albert Gallatin (6th ed.). Boston: Houghton Mifflin. OCLC 7327639.
- Walters, Raymond Jr. (1957). Albert Gallatin: Jeffersonian Financier and Diplomat. Macmillan. Reprint: ISBN 978-0822952107. Additional online edition;.

U.S. Senate
Preceded by William Maclay	United States Senator (Class 1) from Pennsylvania; 1793–1794; Served alongside: Robert Morris	Succeeded by James Ross
Honorary titles
Preceded by John Rutherfurd	Baby of the Senate; 1793–1794	Succeeded by John Rutherfurd
Preceded by John Rutherfurd	Most senior living U.S. senator (Sitting or former); 1840–1849	Succeeded by William Plumer
U.S. House of Representatives
Preceded by William Findley	Member of the U.S. House of Representatives from Pennsylvania's 12th congressional district 1795–1801	Succeeded by William Hoge
Political offices
Preceded by Samuel Dexter	United States Secretary of the Treasury; 1801–1814	Succeeded by George W. Campbell
Diplomatic posts
Preceded by William H. Crawford	United States Minister to France; 1816–1823	Succeeded by James Brown
Preceded by Rufus King	United States Minister to the United Kingdom; 1826–1827	Succeeded by James Barbour
Party political offices
Preceded by Daniel D. Tompkins	Democratic-Republican nominee for Vice President of the United States¹; Withdrew; 1824; Served alongside: John C. Calhoun, Nathan Sanford	Succeeded by Nathaniel Macon
Notes and references
1. The Democratic-Republican Party split in the 1824 election, fielding four separate candidates.
