= Educational Series =

1896 US silver certificate series

"Educational Series," series of 1896 silver certificates
- Country: United States
- Value: $1, $2, $5
- Years of printing: 1896
- Estimated value: US$70 – $38,400

Obverse
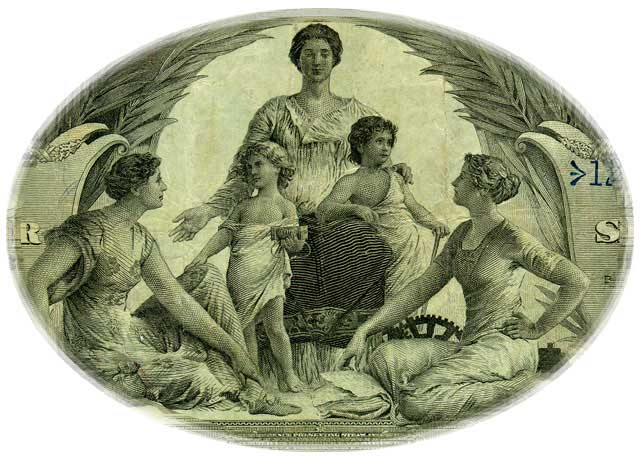
- Design: Closeup of the motif on the $2 note, Science presents Steam and Electricity to Commerce and Manufacture

"Educational Series" refers to a series of three United States silver certificates produced in 1896 by the U.S. Treasury after its Bureau of Engraving and Printing chief Claude M. Johnson ordered a new currency design. The notes depict various allegorical motifs and are considered by many numismatists to be the most beautiful monetary designs ever produced by the United States.

== Design ==
The term "Educational" is derived from the title of the vignette on the $1 note, History Instructing Youth. Each note includes an allegorical scene on the obverse and a pair of portraits on the reverse. Women appear on all three notes.

Denominations of $1, $2, and $5 were produced. Denominations of $10, $20, $50, $100, $500 and $1000 were also planned. The $10 and $50 designs were being prepared but were never completed or produced before the series was abandoned and replaced by the series of 1899.

== Design and production credits ==
=== $1 History Instructing Youth ===
The front was designed by Will Hicok Low and engraved by Charles Schlecht. The back was designed by Thomas F. Morris. The George Washington vignette was engraved by Alfred Sealey (1867) and the Martha Washington vignette was engraved by Charles Burt (1878).

=== $2 Science presenting steam and electricity to Commerce and Manufacture ===
Four artists were commissioned by the BEP to produce key artwork: E. H. Blashfield, Will H. Low, C. S. Reinhart, and Walter Shirlaw. The central vignette was designed by E. H. Blashfield. The central frame and background were designed by Thomas F. Morris. The vignette was engraved by G.F.C. Smillie and the border was engraved by Charles Schlecht. The back was designed by Thomas F. Morris. The Robert Fulton and Samuel F. B. Morse vignettes were engraved by Lorenzo Hatch.

=== $5 Electricity as the Dominant Force in the World ===
The central vignette was designed by Walter Shirlaw and engraved by G.F.C. Smillie. The border was designed and engraved by Thomas F. Morris. The back was designed by Lorenzo J. Hatch and Thomas F. Morris and engraved by G.F.C. Smillie. The Ulysses S. Grant and Phillip Sheridan vignettes were engraved by Lorenzo J. Hatch.

== Controversy ==
The naked breasts of the female figures on the $5 silver certificate reportedly caused some minor controversy when several Boston society ladies took offense to the design. Some bankers reportedly refused to accept the notes in transactions, and the term "banned in Boston" allegedly originates from the $5 silver certificate.

== Notes ==
Educational Series
Image	Value	Dimensions	Description		
Image	Value	Dimensions	Allegorical motif	Obverse	Reverse
$1	$1	Large-sized	History Instructing Youth	A personification of History instructing a youth, pointing to a panoramic view of the Potomac River and Washington, D.C. The Washington Monument and the Capitol are visible in the background. The United States Constitution is displayed to the right. Circling the motif are the last names of famous Americans. Some of those listed are: (George) Washington, (Benjamin) Franklin, (Thomas) Jefferson, (Robert) Fulton, (Samuel F.B.) Morse, & (Ulysses S.) Grant.	Martha Washington, George Washington
	$2	Large-sized	Science presents Steam and Electricity to Commerce and Manufacture	Science (center) presents the two children, Steam and Electricity, to the more mature figures of Commerce (left) and Manufacture (right).	Robert Fulton, Samuel F.B. Morse
	$5	Large-sized	Electricity as the Dominant Force in the World	Electricity surrounded by other allegorical figures, representing the dominant force in the world. The United States Capitol building can be seen behind the female figures.	Ulysses S. Grant, Philip Sheridan
For table standards, see the banknote specification table.

== See also ==
- Silver certificate (United States)
- Black Eagle Silver Certificate
- 1899 United States five-dollar Silver Certificate
