= Art and engraving on United States banknotes =

Engraving on United States banknotes

In early 18th century Colonial America, engravers began experimenting with copper plates as an alternative medium to wood. Applied to the production of paper currency, copper-plate engraving allowed for greater detail and production during printing. It was the transition to steel engraving that enabled banknote design and printing to rapidly advance in the United States during the 19th century.

== Engraving and printing early American banknotes ==
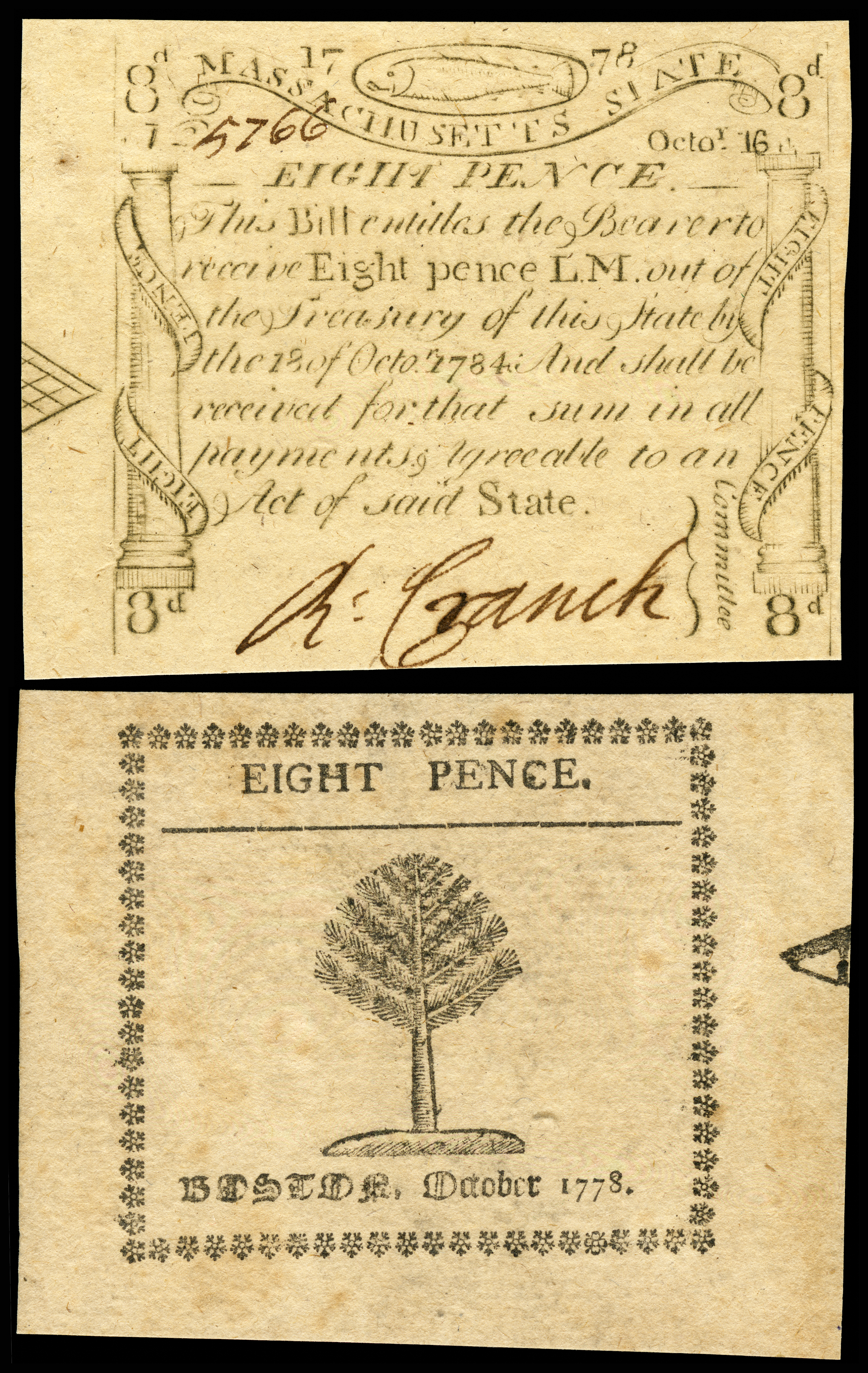
Eight pence note (1778), engraved and printed by Paul Revere

The first issue of government-authorized paper currency in America was printed by the Province of Massachusetts Bay in 1690. This first issue, dated 10 December 1690, was printed from an engraved copper plate with four subjects to a sheet. The first engraver identified in archival records was John Coney who appears to have been paid 30£ on 12 March 1703 to engrave three copper plates for the Massachusetts issue dated 21 November 1702. Given the many design similarities between the 1690 note and those engraved by Coney in 1702, there has been speculation that he may have engraved the earlier note. If true, he would be the first American to engrave on copper plates. Several historical figures with a background in engraving and printing were involved in the production of early American currency.

Benjamin Franklin began printing Province of Pennsylvania notes in 1729, took on a partner (David Hall) in 1749, and then left the currency printing business after the 1764 issue. Paul Revere both engraved and printed bank notes for the Province and then the state of Massachusetts between 1775 and 1779, and the Province of New Hampshire in 1775. Revere's father, Apollos Rivoire, was John Coney's pupil. David Rittenhouse engraved some border designs for the 10 May 1775 Continental currency and 25 March 1776 Colony of New Jersey 6£ note. Francis Hopkinson does not appear to have done engraving, but he is credited with the designs for border-cuts, emblems, and mottos on three issues of Continental currency in 1778–1779.

== Engraving and printing at the U.S. Treasury ==
The first series of Federally-issued United States banknotes was authorized by Congressional acts on 17 July 1861 (12 Stat. 259) and 5 August 1861 (12 Stat. 313). While the Demand Notes were issued from the United States Treasury, they were engraved and printed elsewhere. In 1861, in fact until the mid-1870s, the Treasury Department lacked the facilities or infrastructure to engrave and print the bulk of it financial paper and therefore relied on external contracts with private bank note companies. By means of a Congressional act dated 11 July 1862 (12 Stat. 532), the Secretary of the Treasury received authorization to purchase machinery and employ the staff necessary to manufacture currency at the Treasury. It was not until 1877 (19 Stat. 353) that the Bureau of Engraving and Printing was given funding for labor, paper, transportation, and other expenses with the provision that all work be conducted on site, and for a price commensurate with that of the private bank note companies. On 1 October 1877, the BEP took over the production of both United States Note and National Bank Note production.

== National Bank Notes ==
“TO ARTISTS, ENGRAVERS AND OTHERS – Designs for National Currency Notes are hereby invited, of the denominations of $5, $10, $20, $50, $100, $500 and $1,000, to be issued under the Act of Congress authorizing a National Currency, approved 25 February 1863”. Salmon Chase, Secretary of the Treasury, placed this classified notice in late March, 1863. Other than describe some of the required features of each note (e.g., legal wording, placement of Treasury signatures, etc.), the only direction given to prospective applicants was that submissions must be original (i.e., they cannot have ever been illustrated on U.S. currency) and that "the designs must be national in their character". It is uncertain how many proposals were submitted, or what was involved in the selection process, but the final decision was to draw heavily on the use of historic American images which adorn the Capitol Rotunda. (Note: Spencer M. Clark, the first Superintendent of the National Currency Bureau (later the Bureau of Engraving and Printing), claimed that the idea to use historic images from the capitol rotunda had been his suggestion to the Secretary in the winter of 1861–1862, but he was not acknowledged as the author of the proposal.) The motivation for this selection was two-fold: educationally it would circulate images depicting important scenes from American history while at the same time enhancing the security of the note by involving highly complex engravings.

By July 1863, contracts were signed with American Bank Note Company (ABNCo) and Continental Bank Note Company (CBNCo) (which would later be absorbed by ABNCo) to design, engrave, and begin printing National Bank Notes. ABNCo was contracted for the $20, $50, and $100 denominations, CBNCo was contracted for the $5 and $10 denominations, and National Bank Note Company contracted for the designs for the $2, $500, and $1,000 denominations. The contract descriptions addresses each denomination individually and specifies which image from the Capitol Rotunda should be used for the reverse and what type of vignettes should be on the obverse (with specific names). (Note: This is a standard description for one note quoted verbatim For the obverse of the twenty-dollar ($20) notes, there shall be engraved upon the left-hand portion of the note a vignette representing the "Battle of Lexington," and on the opposite, or right-hand end of the note, a copy of a symbolic design entitled "Loyalty." Between these two vignettes shall be engraved two legends, as follows- In the upper part of the space between the vignettes the following legend, viz: "National currency. This note is secured by the bonds of the United States, deposited with the Treasurer at Washington," together with the engraved fac similes of the signatures of the Treasurer of the United States and of the Register of the Treasury. In the lower part of the space between the vignettes the following words "The First National Bank of Washington D.C. will pay the bearer twenty dollars, on demand, at their office, in the city of Washington, D.C., and suitable blanks shall be left for the date and for the signature of the president and cashier of the association. In the upper right-hand corner of the note the figure 20 is to be engraved, of suitable size, in a white letter with black shade, and a space to be left for imprinting the treasury seal upon the right-hand end of the note; the whole to be surrounded by a suitable border of alternate leaf and vine work, and of tablets, in which the figure 20 and the letters twenty shall be often repeated in different characters. For the reverse of the twenty-dollar ($20) note, there shall be engraved in a central elliptical vignette, two and a half by five (2½ by 5) inches, a fac simile of Chapman's painting in the Capitol, entitled "Baptism of Pocahontas." Above this vignette shall be engraved the legend expressing the uses of the note, and below it the legend expressing the penalties for counterfeiting. The words of these legends to be prescribed by the Secretary of the Treasury. At each end of the vignette oval spaces one by one and a half ( 1 by 1½ ) inch shall be left. For one of these spaces there shall be engraved a suitable die or bed-plate for surface printing, and a roll made therefrom (after its approval by the Secretary of the Treasury) of the national shield; and for the other space the coat of arms of the State from which the note is to be issued. These dies shall not be transferred to the note plates, but twelve (12) transfers therefrom shall be made upon separate plates of steel, and these, with their dies, &c., shall be delivered to the Comptroller of the Currency, or held subject to his order, as hereinbefore provided. The words "First National Bank" shall be engraved above the central vignette, and the words "Washington, D. C.," shall be engraved below it, the two lines so engraved to be between the vignette and the legends. The corners shall be filled with proper counters, indicating the denomination of the note, and the interstices be filled with work of a character to add as much as practicable to the security of the note against counterfeiting; the whole to be surrounded by a suitable border, its exterior size to be the same as the obverse, viz., 3 by 7 inches.) The first National Bank Notes were issued on 21 December 1863.

In 1871, George Frederick Cumming Smillie (G.F.C. Smillie) worked for his uncle James David Smillie at the American Banknote Company. In his career Smillie began working as an engraver for the U.S. Bureau of Engraving and Printing (BEP) in 1894. In 1918 he was made the superintendent of portrait engraving at the BEP. His portraits and vignettes appeared on stamps, currencies and securities. He was a steel-plate engraver and was known for his engravings of presidential portraits. Another BEP engraver named Charles Schlecht began his engraving career at the American Bank Note Company. He later engraved the scene on the obverse of the United States one-dollar bill for the 1896 Educational Series: History Instructing Youth.

=== Denomination set of first issue/design National Bank Notes ===
Art and engraving on National Bank Notes (First Charter Period) (Note: Anti-counterfeiting devices of the period (1869–76) included embedding silk fibers as well as (seen in the $2 and $5 examples) the use of blue tinted paper.)
| Banknote | Value/series (Note: Each National Bank Note, in addition to the engraved Treasury signatures, has the signature of the bank President (or Vice President) and Cashier (or Assistant Cashier).) | Vignette | Vignette information (Note: eng. is the engraver of the work; art. is the creator of an original work from which the engraving was derived.) |
|---|---|---|---|
| | $1 Original Series; The First National Bank; Lebanon, Indiana; Pres John C. Daily; Cash Abram O. Miller | | Concordia (eng) Charles Burt (Art) Theodore August Liebler |
| | $1 Original Series; The First National Bank; Lebanon, Indiana; Pres John C. Daily; Cash Abram O. Miller | | Landing of the Pilgrims (eng) Charles Burt (Note: It is possible that Burt was inspired by (eng) Joseph Andrews, who in turn may have been emulating a painting by Peter F. Rothermel.) (art) Edwin White |
| $2 National Bank Note | $2 Series 1875 (Note: In addition to Stars and Stripes, the reverse of the $2 NBN has the vignette Sir Walter Raleigh Presenting Corn and Tobacco to the English (engraved by Luigi (Louis) Delnoce).); The First National Bank; Emporia, Kansas; Pres Harrison Cory Cross; Cash Elliott Raper Holderman | | Stars and Stripes (eng) Luigi (Louis) Delnoce |
| | $5 Series 1875 (Note: Vignettes on the obverse of the $5 NBN depict Columbus in Sight of Land and Presentation of an Indian Princess to the Old World (both engraved by Charles Burt).); The Vineland National Bank; Vineland, New Jersey; Pres Horatio N. Greene; Cash Willis T. Virgil | | Landing of Columbus (eng) Unsure (Note: At least three different issued engravings were prepared by James Bannister, Louis Delnoce, and Walter Shirlaw.) (art) John Vanderlyn |
| $10 National Bank Note | $10 Series 1875 (Note: The front right vignette on the $10 NBN is Liberty and Progress (designed by Walter Shirlaw, engraved by G.F.C. Smillie).); The First National Bank; Bismarck, North Dakota; VP Henry Rinaldo Porter; Cash O.H. Whitaker | BEP vignette of Franklin and Electricity by Alfred Jones | Franklin and Electricity (eng) Alfred Jones |
| $10 National Bank Note | $10 Series 1875; The First National Bank; Bismarck, North Dakota; VP Henry Rinaldo Porter; Cash O.H. Whitaker | BEP vignette by Frederick Girsch of Powell’s painting DeSoto Discovering the Mississippi | DeSoto Discovering the Mississippi (eng) Frederick Girsch (art) John Trumbull |
| $20 National Bank Note | $20 Series 1875; The First National Bank; Butte, Montana; Pres Andrew Jackson Davis; Cash Emerson B. Weirick | Vignette of the Battle of Lexington | Battle of Lexington (eng) Luigi (Louis) Delnoce (Art) F. O. C. Darley |
| $20 National Bank Note | $20 Series 1875; The First National Bank; Butte, Montana; Pres Andrew Jackson Davis; Cash Emerson B. Weirick | Engraved allegory of loyalty | Loyalty (eng) Alfred Jones |
| $20 National Bank Note | $20 Series 1875; The First National Bank; Butte, Montana; Pres Andrew Jackson Davis; Cash Emerson B. Weirick | Vignette of the Baptism of Pocahontas | Baptism of Pocahontas (eng) Charles Burt (art) John G. Chapman |
| | $50 Series 1875 (Note: Vignettes on the obverse of the $50 NBN depict Washington Crossing the Delaware (engraved by Alfred Jones) and Prayer for Victory (engraved by Luigi (Louis) Delnoce).); The First National Bank; Cleveland, Ohio; Pres James Barnett; Cash Albert K. Spencer | Vignette Embarkation of the Pilgrims | Embarkation of the Pilgrims (eng) W.W. Rice (art) Robert W. Weir |
| $100 National Bank Note | $100 Original Series (Note: Vignettes on the obverse of the $100 NBN depict Battle of Lake Erie (engraved by Luigi (Louis) Delnoce) and an allegory Union (engraved by James Bannister).); The Raleigh National Bank; Raleigh, North Carolina; Pres William Horn Battle; Cash Charles Francis Dewey | | Declaration of Independence (eng) Frederick Girsch (art) John Trumbull |
| $500 National Bank Note | $500 Original Series (Note: The $500 NBN right side vignette depicts Arrival of the Sirius.); The Appleton National Bank; Lowell, Massachusetts; Pres John A. Knowles; Cash John F. Kimball | BEP Allegory of Civilization by James David Smillie | Civilization (eng) James David Smillie |
| $500 National Bank Note | $500 Original Series; The Appleton National Bank; Lowell, Massachusetts; Pres John A. Knowles; Cash John F. Kimball | BEP vignette by Frederick Girsch of Trumbull’s painting Surrender of General Burgoyne | Surrender of General Burgoyne (eng) Frederick Girsch (art) John Trumbull |
| Proof of a $1,000 National Bank Note | $1,000 Series 1875 (proof) (Note: The $1,000 NBN right side vignette depicts The Capitol (engraved by James Smillie).); The First National Bank; Salem, Massachusetts | General Scott entering Mexico City by Alfred Jones | Scott Entering City of Mexico (eng) Alfred Jones |
| Proof of a $1,000 National Bank Note | $1,000 Series 1875 (proof); The First National Bank; Salem, Massachusetts | BEP vignette by Delnoce & Girsch of Trumbull’s painting General George Washington Resigning His Commission | General George Washington Resigning His Commission (eng) Delnoce & Girsch (art) John Trumbull |

=== Gallery of related artwork ===
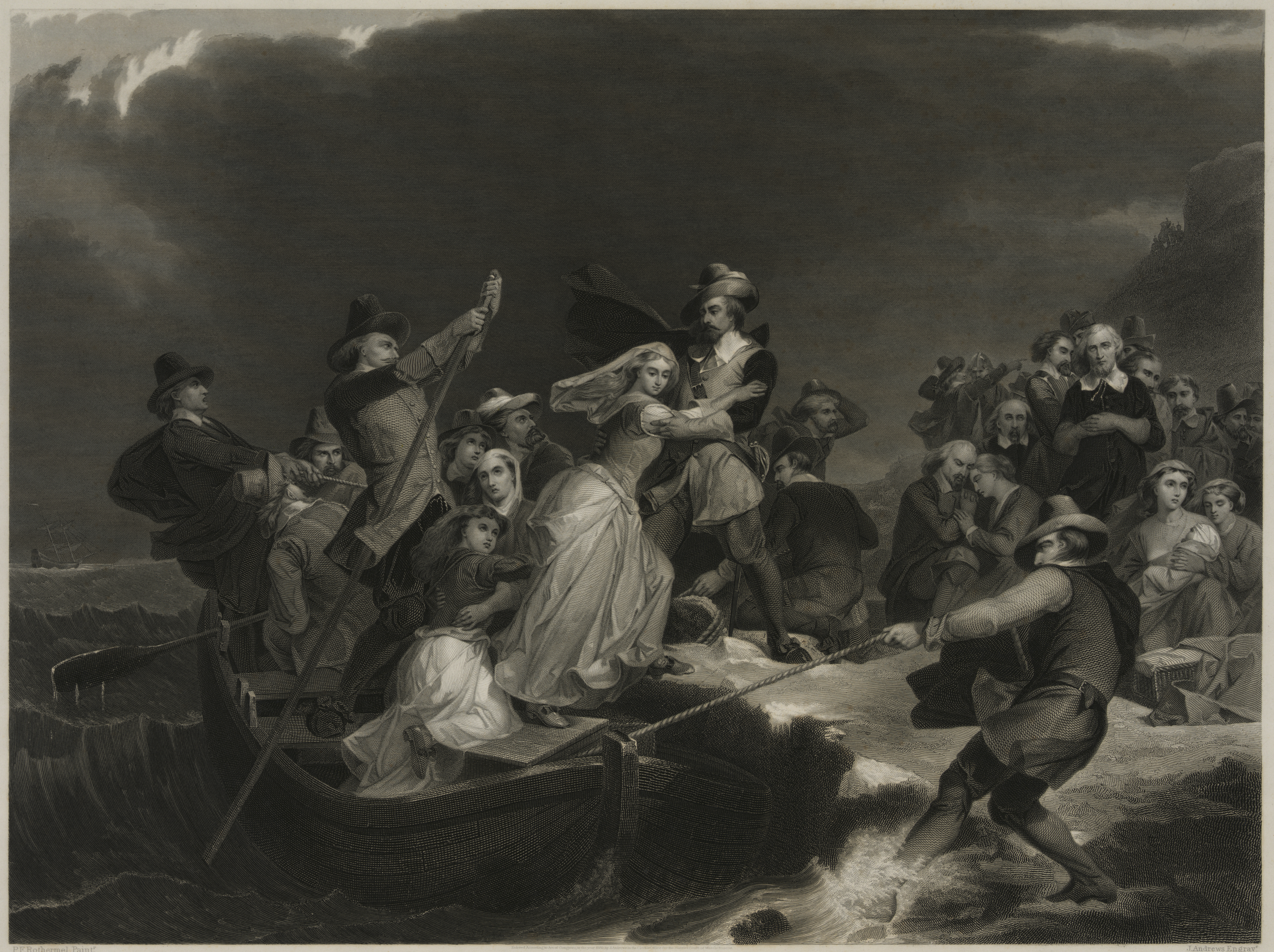
Landing of the Pilgrims

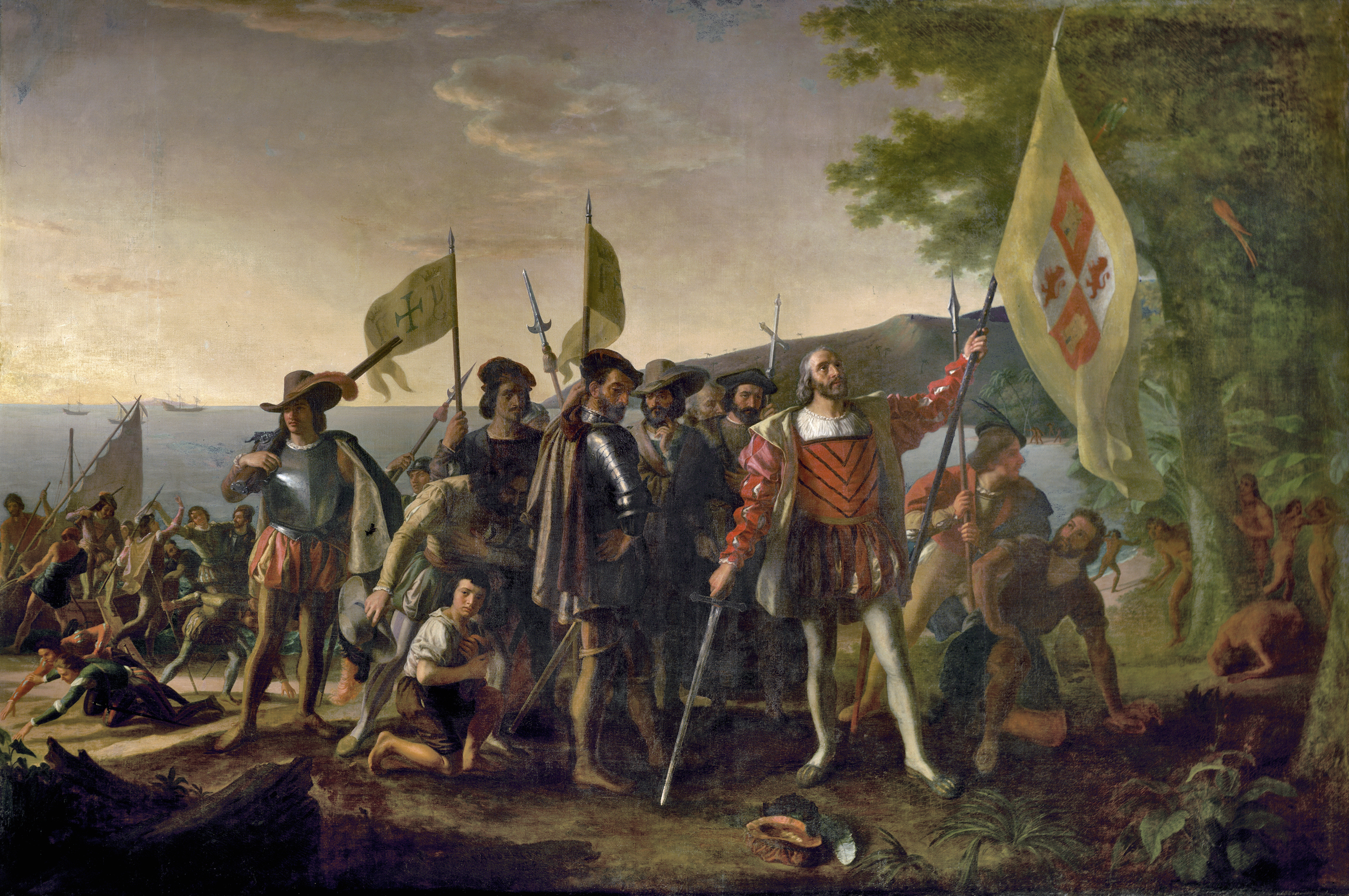
Landing of Columbus by John Vanderlyn, 1847

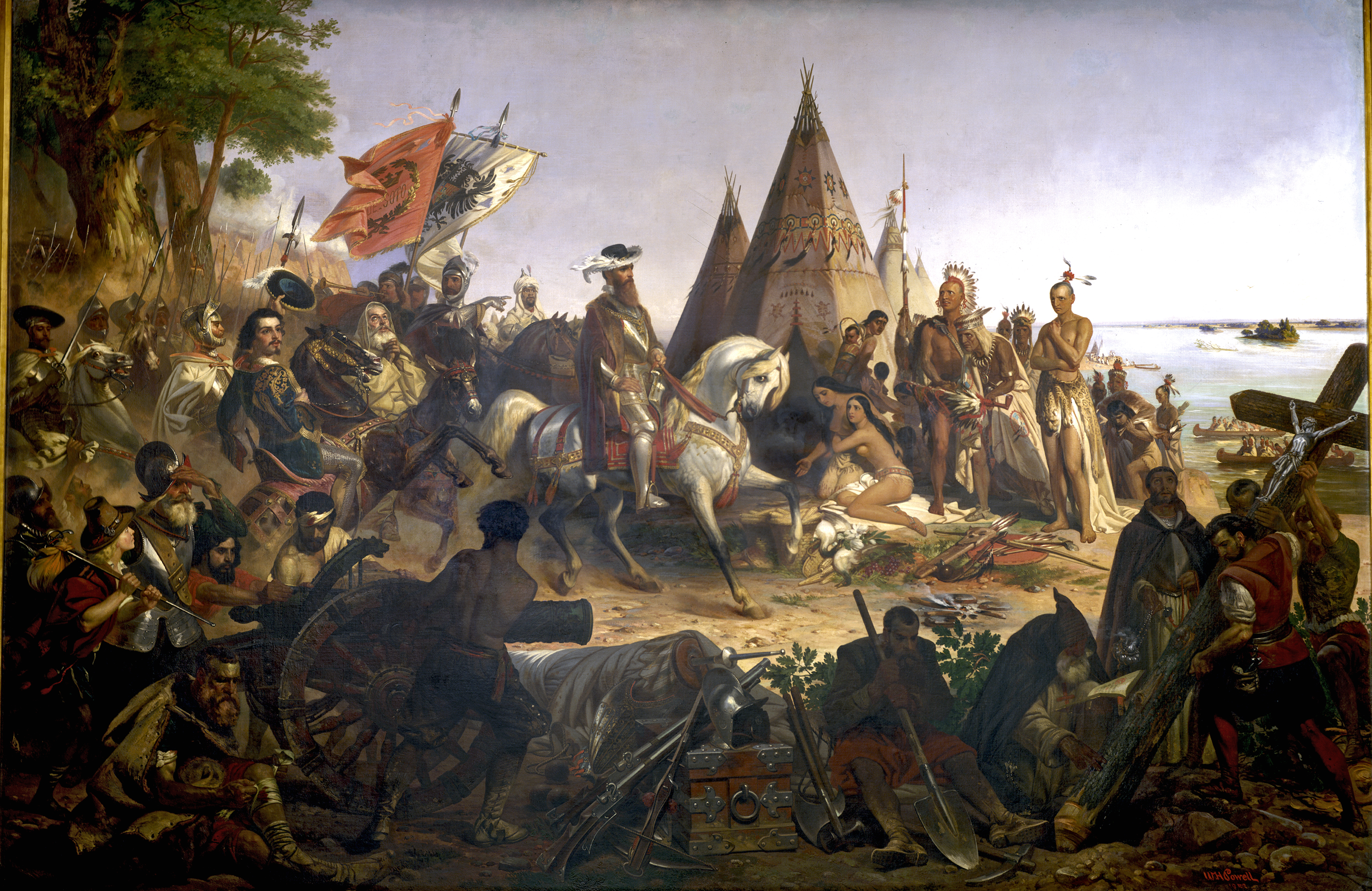
DeSoto's Discovery of the Mississippi

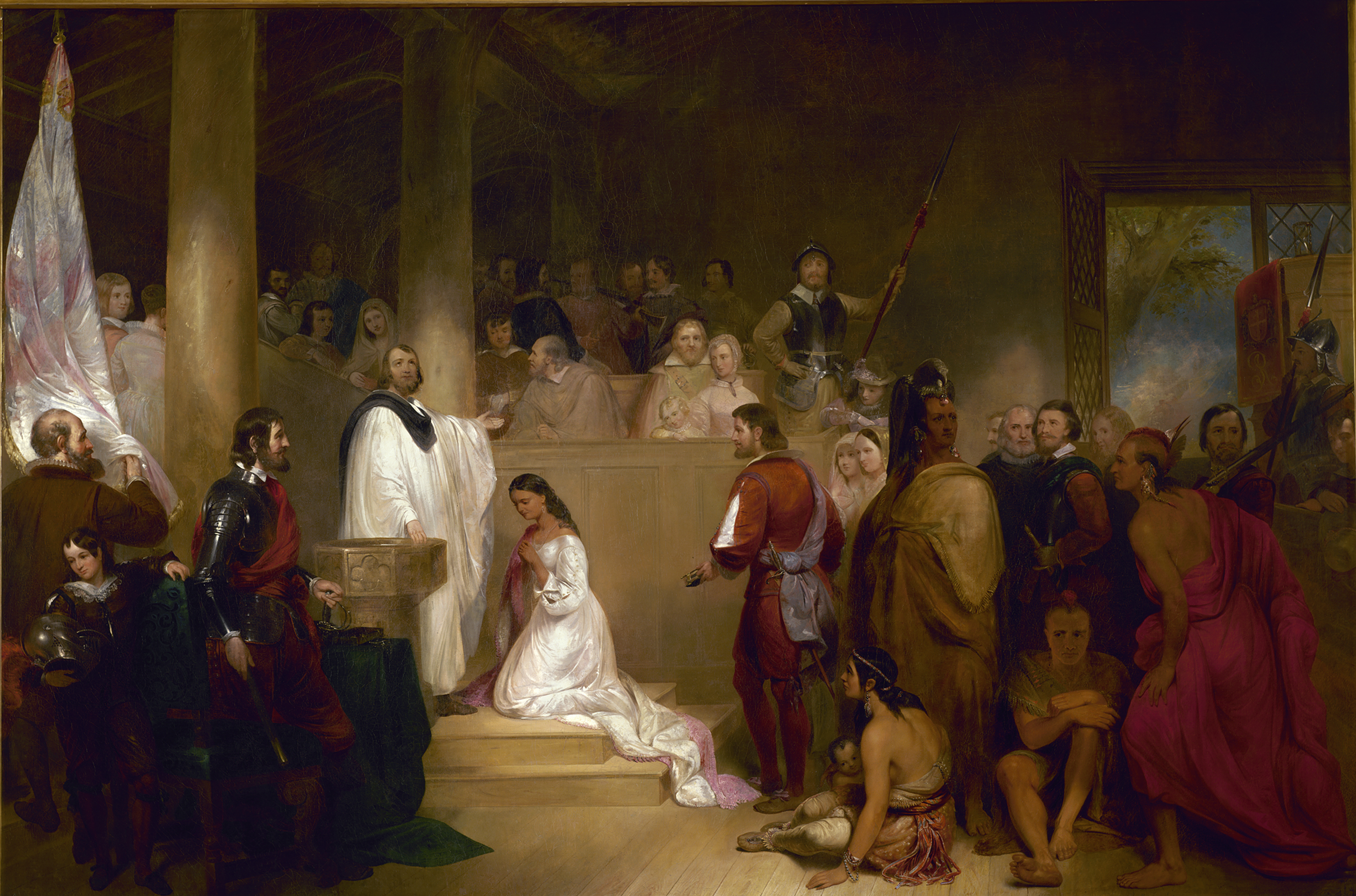
Baptism of Pocahontas

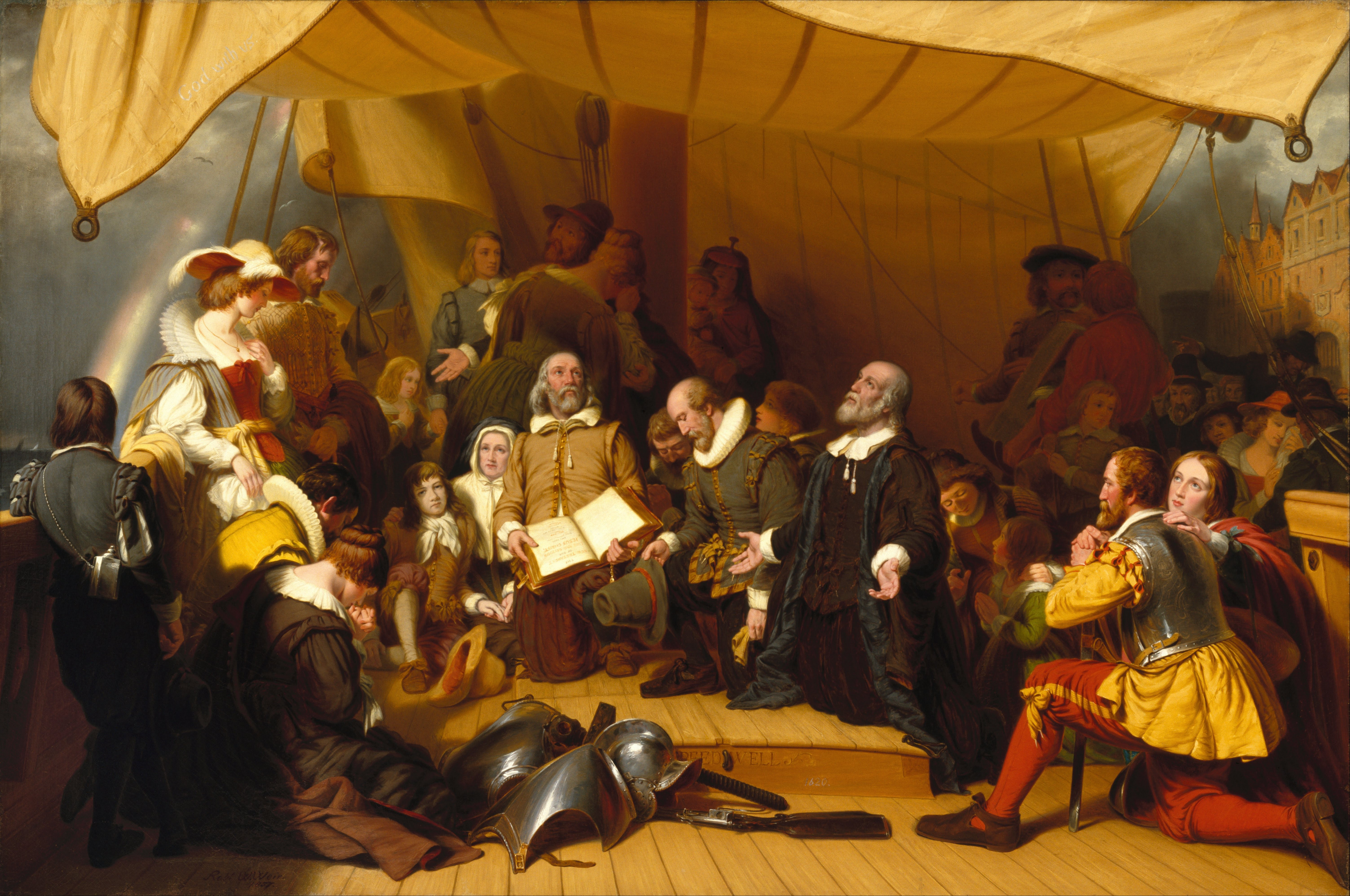
Embarkation of the Pilgrims

Signing of the Declaration of Independence

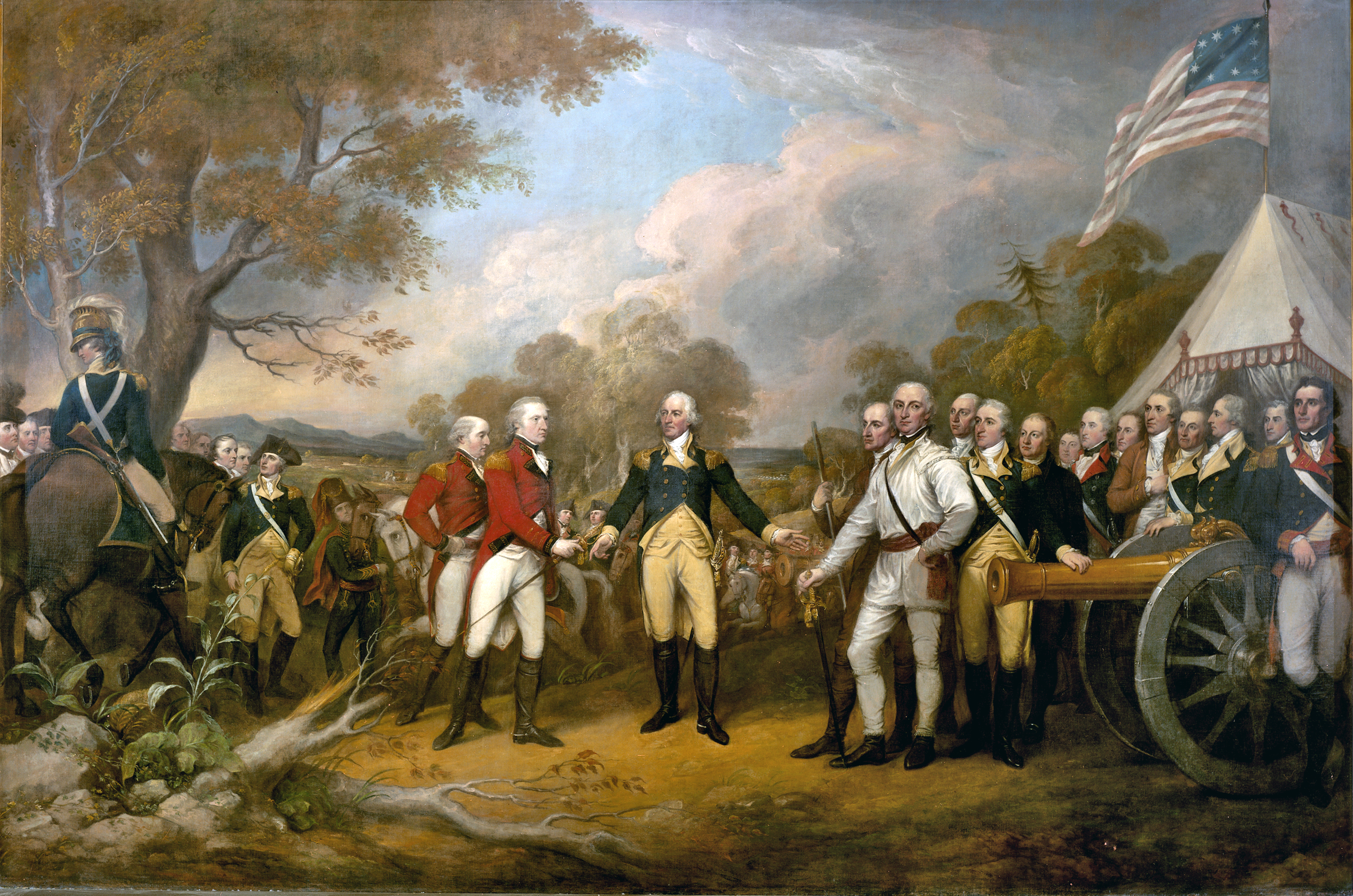
Surrender of General Burgoyne

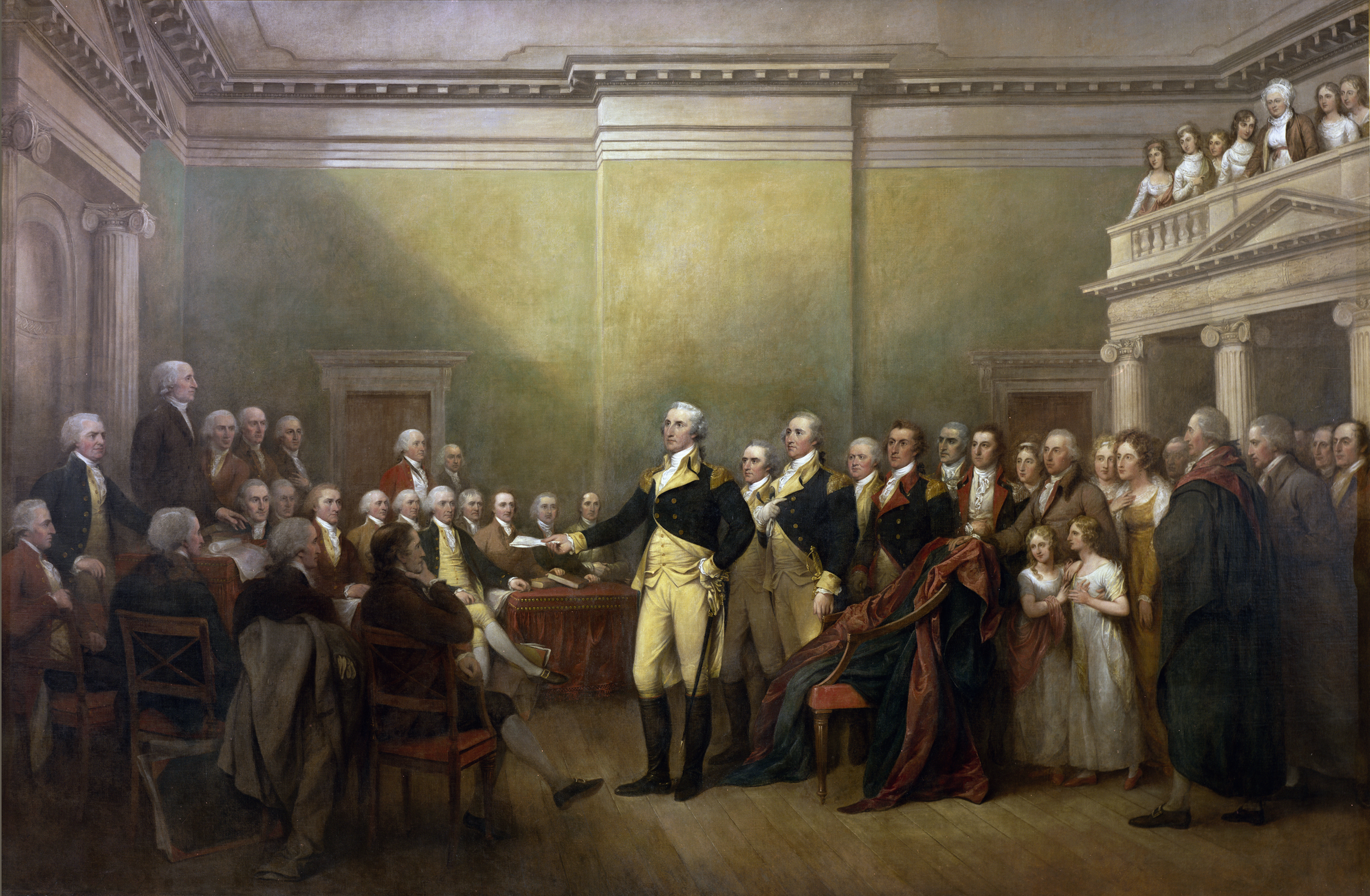
Washington Resigning his Commission

== Interest Bearing Notes ==
Art and engraving on Interest Bearing Notes
| Banknote | Value/series | Vignette | Vignette information |
|---|---|---|---|
| | $10 One-year 5% (1864) | | Peace |
| | $50 Two-year 5% (1864) | | Caduceus (eng) Alfred Jones (art) John W. Casilear |
| | $100 Two-year 5% (1864) | | Farmer and Mechanic |
| | $100 Two-year 5% (1864) | | In the Turret |
| | $1,000 One-year 5% (1863) | | Justice |
| | $1,000 Two-year 5% (1863) | | Guerriere and Constitution (Note: The price quoted by the Continental Bank Note Company (in 1863) to design and engrave both Constitution and Guerriere and De Soto on the Shores of the Mississippi - $150 each.) |
| | $5,000 One-year 5% (1863) | | The Altar of Liberty (eng) Luigi (Louis) Delnoce |

== Other ==
Art and engraving on Other Notes
| Banknote | Value/series | Vignette | Vignette information |
|---|---|---|---|
| | $10 Legal Tender (1880) | | Introduction of the Old World to the New |
| | $5 Legal Tender (1880) | | The Pioneer also known as The Woodcutter or Wood-Chopper (eng) Gugler |
| | $500 Gold certificate (1882) | | Eagle |

== Portraits ==
Portraits
| Banknote (Note: In the Portraits section, the size of the images are not in correct proportion to one another.) | Value/series | Portrait | Vignette information |
|---|---|---|---|
| | $1 Legal Tender (1880) | | George Washington |
| | $2 Legal Tender (1880) | | Thomas Jefferson (Eng) Charles Burt |
| | $5,000 Gold certificate (1870) | | James Madison (Eng) Alfred Sealey |
| | $100 Silver certificate (1891) | | James Monroe (Eng) Luigi (Louis) Delnoce |
| | $500 Legal Tender (1869) | | John Quincy Adams (Eng) Charles Burt |
| | $10,000 Gold certificate (1875) | | Andrew Jackson (Eng) Alfred Sealey |
| | $500 Gold certificate (1870) | | Abraham Lincoln |
| | $5,000 4% Consol Bond (1877) | | Andrew Johnson |
| | $20,000 U.S. Funded Loan Bond (1891) | | Zachary Taylor |
| | $20 Legal Tender (1869) | | Alexander Hamilton (Eng) Charles Burt |
| | $0.50 Fractional currency | | Samuel Dexter |
| | $0.50 Fractional currency | | William Crawford (Eng) Charles Burt |
| | $0.25 Fractional currency | | Robert Walker (Eng) Charles Burt |
| | $0.10 Fractional currency | | William Meredith (Eng) Charles Burt |
| | $20,000 4% Consol Bond (1877) | | Salmon P. Chase |
| | $20 Silver certificate (1886) | | Daniel Manning (Eng) Lorenzo Hatch |
| | $2 Silver certificate (1891) | | William Windom (Eng) William Phillips |
