= Hamilton Wright Mabie =

American writer

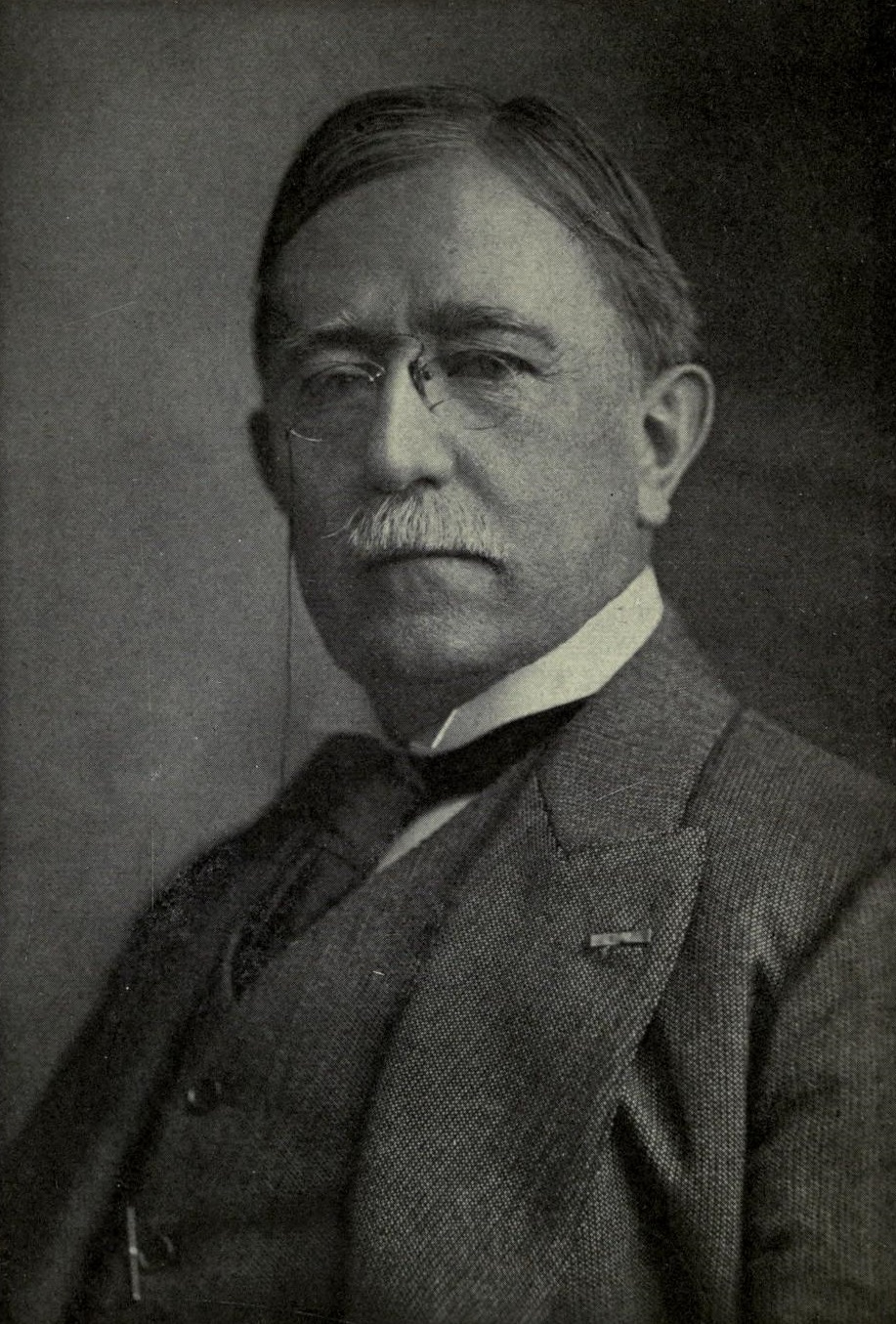
Hamilton Wright Mabie

Hamilton Wright Mabie, A.M., L.H.D., LL.D. (December 13, 1846 – December 31, 1916) was an American essayist, editor, critic, and lecturer.

== Biography ==
Hamilton Wright Mabie was born at Cold Spring, New York, on December 13, 1846. He was the youngest child of Sarah Colwell Mabie who was from a wealthy Scottish-English family and Levi Jeremiah Mabie, whose ancestors were Scots-Dutch. They were early immigrants to New Amsterdam, New Netherland, about 1647. Due to business opportunities with the opening of the Erie Canal his family moved to Buffalo, New York, when he was approaching school age. At age 16 he passed his college entrance examination, but waited a year before he attended Williams College (1867) and Columbia Law School (1869).

While at Williams, Mabie was a member of Alpha Delta Phi fraternity and would serve as the first president of the North American Interfraternity Conference (formally known as the National Interfraternity Conference).

He received honorary degrees from his own alma mater, from Union College, and from Western Reserve and Washington and Lee universities. Although he passed his bar exams in 1869, he hated both the study and practice of law. In 1876 he married Jeanette Trivett. In the summer of 1879 he was hired to work at the weekly magazine, Christian Union (renamed The Outlook in 1893), an association that lasted until his death.

In 1884, Mabie was promoted to associate editor of the Christian Union and then elected to the Author's Club, whose members included such men of established reputation as George Cary Eggleston, Richard Watson Gilder, Brander Matthews, and Edmund Clarence Stedman.

In 1890, a small collection of Mabie's essays which reflected upon life, literature and nature were published as a volume entitled My Study Fire.

Many of Mabie's books are available at Project Gutenberg.

Front Matter from In Arcady by Hamilton Wright Mabie and illustrated by Will Hicok Low. 1909 First Edition. Photo by Mr. Sorensen.

Under The Tree (1902) illustrated by C. L. Hinton

Mabie was a resident of Summit, New Jersey. He died at his home there on December 13, 1916, and was buried at Sleepy Hollow Cemetery in New York.

== Quotations ==
"Blessed is the season which engages the whole world in a conspiracy of love."

"Don't be afraid of opposition. Remember, a kite rises against, not with the wind."

== Selected works ==
- Norse Stories, Retold from the Eddas (1882)
- Nature in New England (1890)
- My Study Fire (two series, 1890 and 1894)
- In the Forest of Arden (1891)
- Short Studies in Literature (1891)
- Under the Trees and Elsewhere (1891)
- Essays in Literary Interpretation (1892)
- Essays on Nature and Culture (1896)
- Essays on Books and Culture (1897)
- Essays on Work and Culture (1898)
- The Life of the Spirit (1899)
- William Shakespeare, Poet, Dramatist, and Man (1900)
- A Child of Nature (1901) Published by Dodd, Mead and Company
- Works and Days (1902)
- Parables of Life (1902)
- In Arcady (1903) Published by Dodd, Mead and Company
- Backgrounds of Literature (1904)
- Introduction to Notable Poems (1909)
- American Ideals, Character, and Life (1913)
- Japan To-Day and To-Morrow (1914)

=== Every Child Should Know ===
Doubleday, Page & Co. published this anthology series, in which Mabie edited several early volumes:

- Fairy Tales Every Child Should Know (1905)
- Myths That Every Child Should Know (1905)
- Heroes Every Child Should Know (1906)
- Legends That Every Child Should Know (1906)
- Famous Stories Every Child Should Know (1907)
- Essays That Every Child Should Know (1908)
- Heroines That Every Child Should Know (1908), ed. Mabie and Kate Stephens
- Folk Tales Every Child Should Know (1910)
- Library of the world's best literature, ancient and modern; New York, R. S. Peale and J. A. Hill, (c.1896-97), co-contributor
