= Steel engraving =

Illustration printed with a steel plate

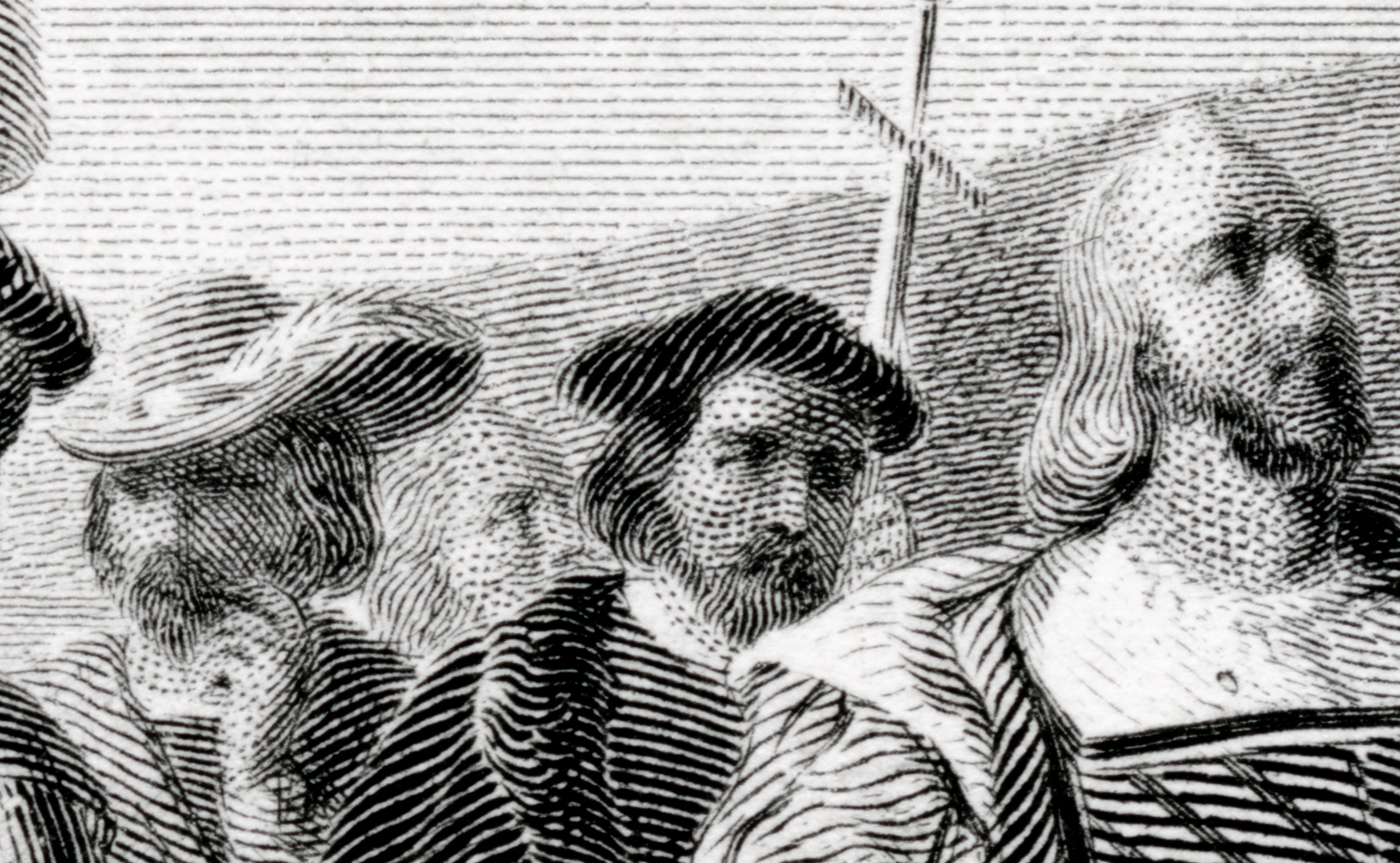
Detail of the image below; click to enlarge further

Steel engraving is a technique for printing illustrations on paper using steel printing plates instead of copper, the harder metal allowing a much longer print run before the image quality deteriorates. It has been rarely used in artistic printmaking, although it was much used for reproductions in the 19th century. Steel "engraving", in fact technically mostly using etching, was introduced in 1792 by Jacob Perkins (1766–1849), an American inventor, for banknote printing. When Perkins moved to London in 1818, the technique was adapted in 1820 by Charles Warren and especially by Charles Heath (1785–1848) for Thomas Campbell's Pleasures of Hope, which contained the first published plates engraved on steel. The new technique only partially replaced the other commercial line engraving techniques of that time such as wood engraving, copper engraving and later lithography.

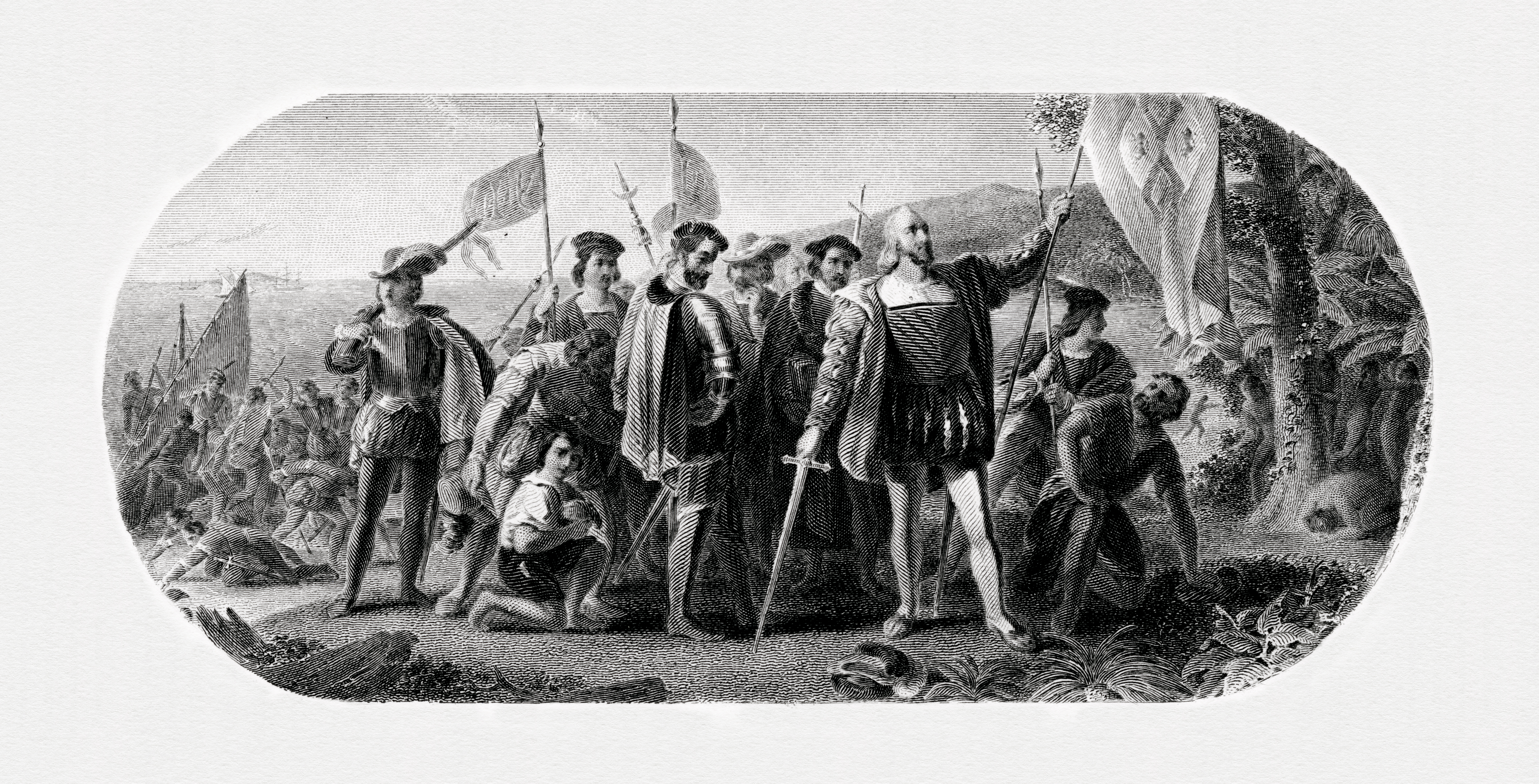
Landing of Columbus, engraved by the BEP based on Vanderlyn's 1847 painting. This vignette was used as the back of the Series 1875 $5 National Bank Note.

== Process ==
Baptism of Pocahontas, engraved by Charles Burt for the BEP based on Chapman's 1840 painting. This vignette was used as the back of the Series 1875 $20 National Bank Note.

Confusingly, the printmaking technique used in steel engravings is, after the earliest years in the 1820s, normally a combination of etching and true engraving, with etching becoming dominant in later examples, after the technique became popular again in the 1830s. Engraving is done with a burin, which is a small bar of hardened steel with a sharp point. It is pushed along the plate to produce thin furrowed lines, leaving "burr" or strips of waste metal to the side. This is followed by the use of a scraper to remove any burs, since they would be an impediment during the subsequent inking process. Steel plates are very hard for this technique, which is normally used on softer copper plates. So steel engraving also used etching, where acid creates the lines in the plates in the pattern made by selectively removing a thin coating of acid-resistant ground by tools. This is much less effort. As well as etching needles, the etched part of steel engravings made great use of roulettes, small wheels mounted in handles which have regular sharp projections which produce broken lines of dots and dashes when rolled across the plate. Roulettes of different types were used together with the burin and needle to create densely packed marks which appear as tonal to the eye, and allow a great variety of textures and effects. True burin engraving was generally used to finish the etched image.

First a broad, general outline is made on the plate before starting the detailed image. Engraving will produce a printed reverse or mirror image of the image on the plate. Sometimes engravers looked at the object, usually another image such as a drawing, that they were engraving through a mirror so that the image was naturally reversed and they would be less likely to engrave the image incorrectly.

Steel plates can be case hardened to ensure that they can print thousands of times with little wear. The copper plates used in traditional engraving and etching, which are softer and so much easier to work cannot be case hardened but can be steel-faced or nickel-plated by electroplating to increase the number of impressions that could be printed. From about 1860 the steel-facing of copper plates became widely used, and such prints tend also to be called steel engravings. It can be very difficult to distinguish between engravings on steel and steel-faced copper, other than by date. The most reliable way of distinguishing between unfaced copper engraving and steel or steel-faced engraving is the "lightness and delicacy of the pale lines" in the latter. The hardness of the plate surface made it possible to print a good number of impressions without the metal of the plate wearing the lines out under the pressure of repeated intaglio printing, which would have happened with unfaced copper. So "A shimmering pale grey became for the first time a possibility in line engraving, and it is this that provides the most recognizable characteristic of steel beside the heavier and warmer mood of copper".

== 19th century ==
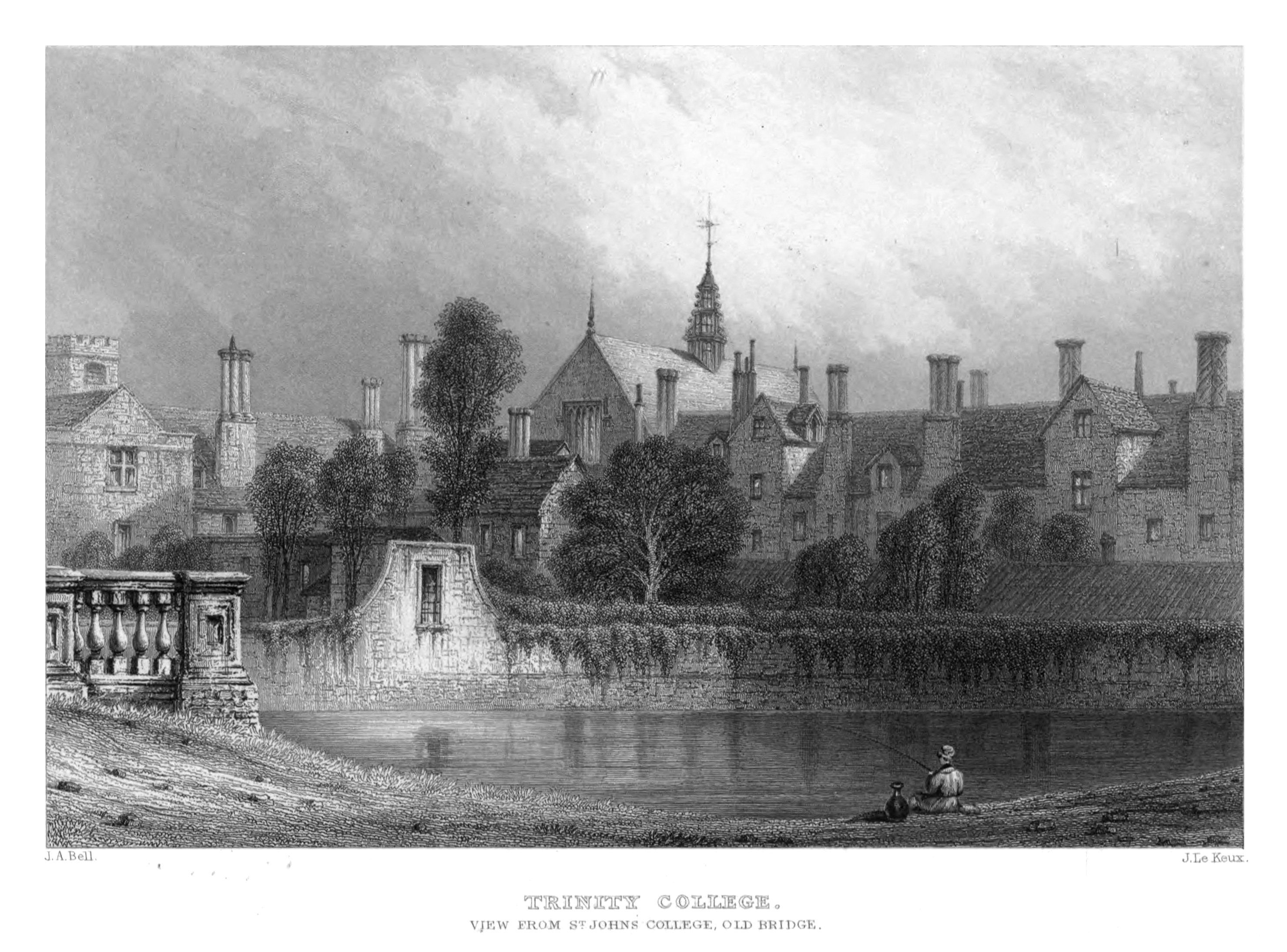
Trinity College, Cambridge; View from St John's College Old Bridge, c. 1840. steel engraving was much used for decorative topographical prints such as this, by John Le Keux.

Until around 1820 copper plates were the common medium used for engraving. Copper, being a soft metal, was easy to carve or engrave and the plates could be used to strike a few hundred copies before the image began to severely deteriorate from wear. Engravers then reworked a worn plate by retracing the previous engraving to sharpen the image again. Another advantage to using copper is that it is a soft metal and can be corrected or updated with a reasonable amount of effort. For this reason, copper plates were the preferred medium of printing for mapmakers, who needed to alter their maps whenever land was newly discovered, claimed, or changed hands.

During the 1820s steel began to replace copper as the preferred medium of commercial publishers for illustration, but still rivaled by wood engraving and later lithography. Steel engraving produced plates with sharper, harder, more distinct lines. Also, the harder steel plates produced much longer wearing dies that could strike thousands of copies before they would need any repair or refurbishing engraving. The hardness of steel also allowed for much finer detail than would have been possible with copper, which would have quickly deteriorated under the resulting stress. As the nineteenth century began to close, devices such as the ruling machine made even greater detail possible, allowing for more exact parallel lines in very close proximity. Commercial etching techniques also gradually replaced steel engraving.

Steel engraving is still done today, but to a much lesser extent. Today, most printing is done using computerized stencils instead of a steel plate to transfer ink. An exception is currency, which is still printed using steel dies, since each bill then has a character and feel that is very difficult for counterfeiters to duplicate. An engraved plate causes the ink to be slightly raised and the paper to be slightly depressed, which produces a different haptic sensation than does paper printed by a stencil ink transfer process.

== Mechanical tools ==
From the beginning of the nineteenth century, new tools made engraving much easier and more exact. The ruling machine created parallel straight or wavy lines very close together, usually for use with etching. Another of these tools is the geometric lathe. The lathe is used to engrave images on plates, which are in turn engraved on rolls for such uses as printing banknotes. Another of these tools is the engraving machine. This machine uses a master template to lightly engrave a duplicate image which can be then engraved by hand or etched with acid. The machine also makes possible the reduction or enlargement of the letter for the duplicate image.
