= George Madden Martin =

American novelist

Mrs. Attwood R. Martin
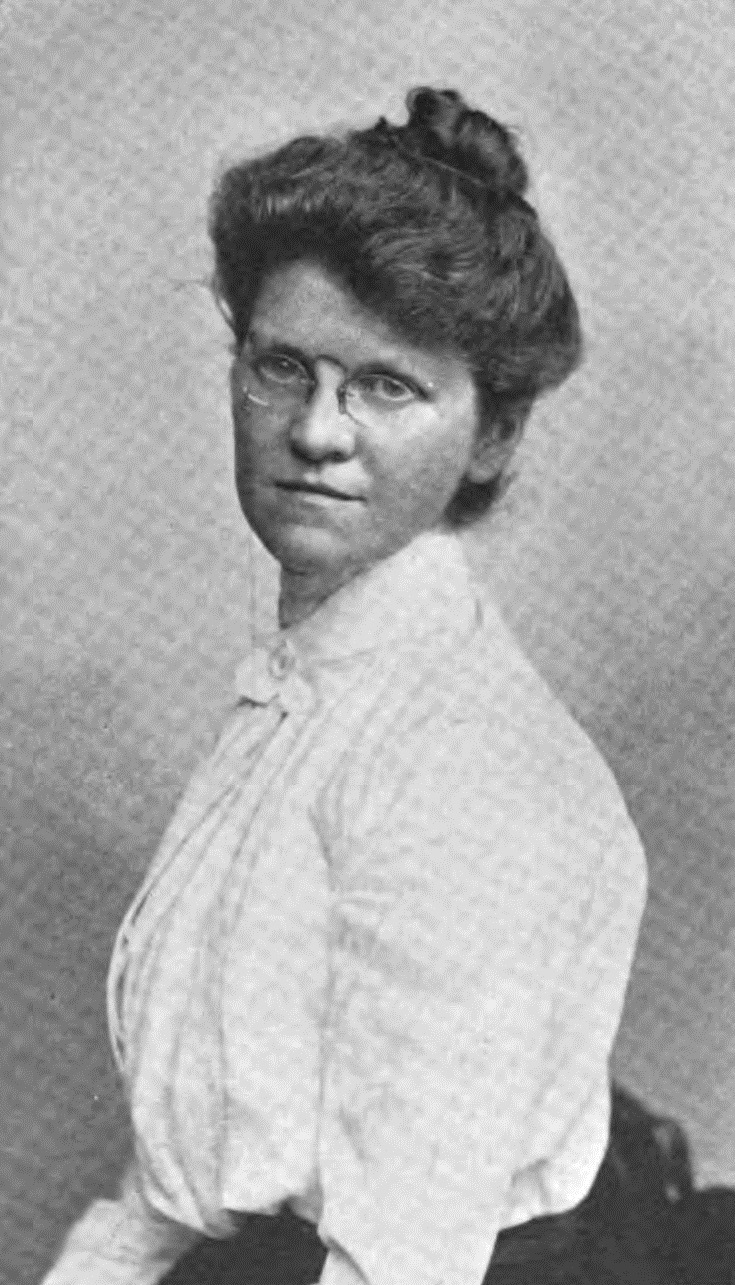
- Born: Georgia May Madden; 3 May 1866; Louisville, Kentucky, USA
- Died: 30 November 1946 (aged 80); Louisville
- Occupation: Fiction writer
- Spouse: Attwood Reading Martin (m. 1892)
- Writing career
- Pen name: George Madden Martin

George Madden Martin (born Georgia May Madden, 3 May 1866 – 30 November 1946) was the pen name of Mrs. Attwood R. Martin, an American fiction writer of short stories, novels, and plays. She was also a Harlem Renaissance supporter and activist.

== Early life and education ==
Georgia May Madden was born in Louisville, Kentucky, 3 May 1866. Her parents were Frank, a bookseller, and Anne Mckenzie Madden. Her sister, Eva Anne Madden, was also a writer.

Much of her education was conducted by private tutors. She completed her education at home because of poor health.

== Career ==
During the period of approximately 1890 until 1892, she was a teacher at Wellseley School. In 1892, she married Attwood Reading Martin, a wealthy businessman.

Beginning in 1895, when she published "Teckla's Lilies" in Harper's Weekly, Martin was a constant writer for magazines. In addition to Harper's Weekly, her stories, all marked by humor and attention to nicety of style, appeared in The Youth's Companion, Short Stories, St. Nicholas Magazine, Munsey's Magazine, The Black Cat, Ladies' Home Journal, and other publications. She was known mostly by her pseudonym, George Madden Martin.

Being almost an invalid, Martin did much of her work in spite of bad health and physical hindrances. One book, The Angel of the Tenement, appeared in an English edition at Christmas. While intended for children, it appealed more strongly to adults. To the surprise of the author, it was chosen as a text by a New York divine, and was referred to in a lecture at Johns Hopkins University, in one case because it offered a solution of vexed social problems, and in the other because it marked a certain departure in fiction. The writer, in consequence, was referred to as a student of tenements, a social "settler," a kindergartner, even a reformer, although she knew little of cities, her life having been divided between Kentucky and Florida.

Martin was devoted to writing, for which she was trained by her husband, as she was forced by bad health to leave school at the age of fifteen. She was a student of William Shakespeare, and a researcher in the use of words. Among her stories were "Teckla's Lilies", "His Children", "The Blumley Benefit", "The Church at Jerusalem", "Mr. Tiply Tepto", "Thelnskip Pride", and "The Pink Sprigged Calicoes". She published eleven novels in her career.

Martin's writing slowed down when her political activism increased. She supported the Democratic Party and opposed racial oppression. A member of a Louisville literary club, she also affiliated with the Committee on Interracial Cooperation (charter member, 1920) and the Association of Southern Women for the Prevention of Lynching, where she took on a leadership role in the 1930s.

== Personal life ==
She made her home at "Martinwood," a country house in Anchorage, Kentucky, several miles to the east of Louisville. Martin died in Louisville, 30 November 1946.

== Bibliography ==
Novels

- The Angel of the Tenement, 1897
- Martin, George Madden (1902). Emmy Lou: Her Book and Heart. Charles Louis Hinton (illustrator). New York City: McClure, Phillips & Co.
- The House of Fulfilment, 1904
- Abbie Ann, 1907
- Letitia: Nursery Corps, U.S. Army, 1907
- A Warwickshire Lad, 1916
- Children in the Mist, 1920
- March On, 1921
- Made in America, 1935
