= History Instructing Youth =

United States one-dollar silver certificate

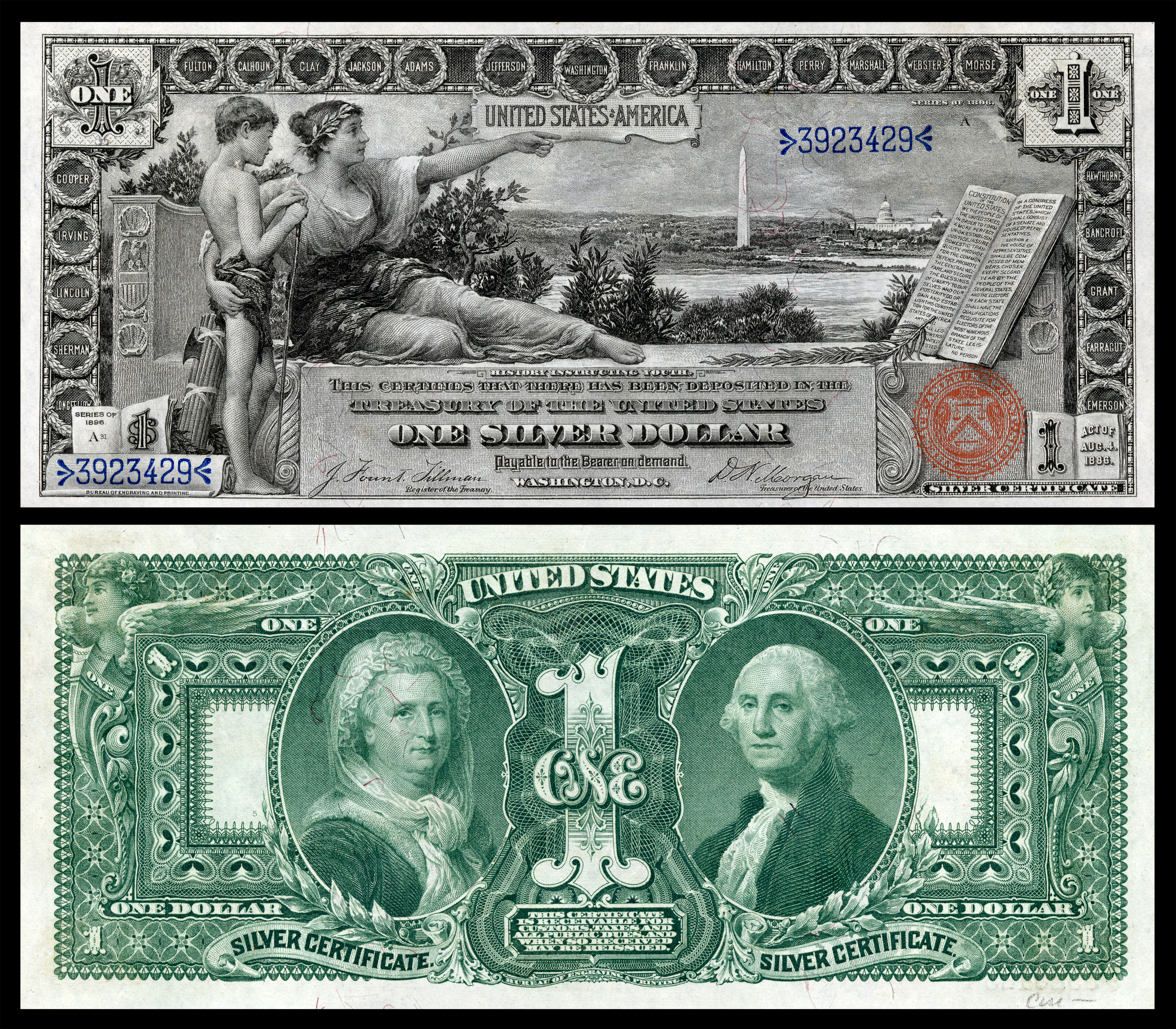
History Instructing Youth

History Instructing Youth is a series 1896 United States one-dollar bill. It was one of three notes in the US Bureau of Engraving and Printing's (BEP) Educational Series. After many complaints about the notes in the series, the BEP replaced them in 1899. Today, it is considered one of the most beautiful and popular US large-size notes. The scene on the note's obverse is allegorical and features a woman who is instructing a young boy about United States history.

== Description ==
The obverse of the note features the names of 23 people within wreaths around the border. The notables listed include statesmen (John C. Calhoun, Henry Clay, Andrew Jackson, John Adams, Thomas Jefferson, George Washington, Benjamin Franklin, Alexander Hamilton, Abraham Lincoln, Ulysses S. Grant, John Marshall, Daniel Webster, George Bancroft), military figures (Oliver Hazard Perry, William Tecumseh Sherman, David Farragut), writers (Washington Irving, Henry Wadsworth Longfellow, Nathaniel Hawthorne, James Fenimore Cooper, Ralph Waldo Emerson) and inventors (Robert Fulton, Samuel Morse). The Washington Monument and the U.S. Capitol building are visible on the obverse.

The allegorical scene on the obverse of the History Instructing Youth note portrays a woman (History) instructing a young boy (Youth) about United States history. The woman is on the left of the obverse and the boy is to her left. The $1 certificate's theme focused on the past and the two other denominations in the Educational Series, the $2 and $5, featured national progress and technology. History is reclining on a marble block and she is pointing at a book while the boy looks on. The American flag is laid across her lap and her head is adorned with a laurel wreath. Each bottom corner of the note's obverse has an illustration of an open book. The note states, "This certifies that there has been deposited in the Treasury of the United States one silver dollar, payable to bearer on demand. To the right on the obverse, there is a red seal. The reverse features two allegorical winged figures and portraits of the first US president George Washington and his wife Martha Washington.

Large-note varieties of US currency were often referred to as "Horse Blankets". The 1896 large-size History Instructing Youth measured 7.38 in (187 mm) by 3.18 in (81 mm). In 1928 the United States transitioned to small-size notes which measured 6.14 in (156 mm) by 2.61 in (66 mm).

== History ==
The obverse of the note was designed by Will Hicok Low and it was called History Instructing Youth. The design of the bill was accepted on July 10, 1894, and printing began on April 18, 1896. The engraving for the obverse of the one-dollar History Instructing Youth note was done by Charles Schlecht. Schlecht began work on the engraving for the obverse in August 1892 and completed his work on January 1, 1895.

The design of the reverse was executed by Thomas F. Morris. The reverse featured complex lathework and winged figures in the upper corners. The reverse also features two portraits which were completed earlier. In 1878, Charles Burt engraved the portrait of Martha and in 1867 Alfred Sealey engraved the portrait of George. The depiction of Martha Washington on the silver certificate was the last time a woman appeared on United States paper money.

The one dollar note was part of a series known as the Educational Series and it included a redesigned one, two, five and ten-dollar bill. The US Bureau of Engraving and Printing produced fifteen separate plates for the production of the note. For the first time, the BEP chose to forgo lathework on the obverse to give designers a larger area to incorporate their design. The note became popular among collectors for its beauty. In their guide book to American paper money, Arthur and Ira Friedberg state that History Instructing Youth is the famous note in the series and "[p]erhaps the most popular large-size note". History Instructing Youth, along with the other notes of the Educational Series, are "considered to be among the most beautiful American notes ever printed", according to curator Ellen R. Feingold . The note was ranked number seven in the 100 Greatest American Currency Notes book by David M. Sundman and Q. David Bowers.

=== Controversy ===
The Educational Series came to be called "dirty dollars" because of objections towards the portrayal of unclothed women on notes. Due to this early controversy, the BEP reissued notes in 1897 with more clothing on the women. Another complaint centered on the skin color of the women on the notes. The lack of complicated lathework on the obverse meant that counterfeiters could potentially forge them more easily. In 1899, the controversies caused the BEP to replace the series just three years after issue.
