= Alfred Sealey =

American artist and engraver

Alfred Sealey (c. 1815-1868) was an engraver for the US Bureau of Engraving and Printing. He engraved several portraits which were used by the united States Bureau of Engraving and Printing on paper money.

== Biography ==
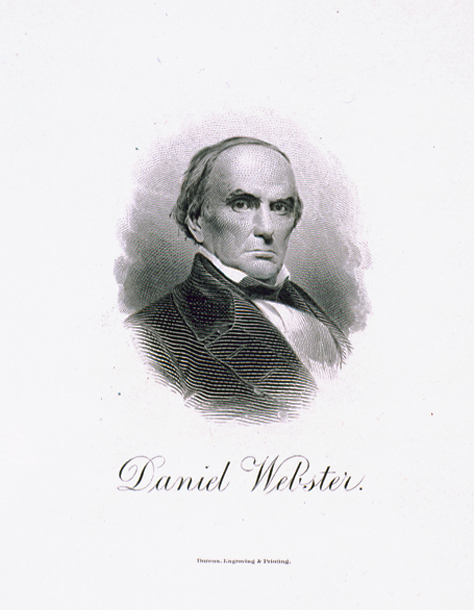
Daniel Webster engraving executed by Alfred Sealy

Alfred was born in New York c. 1815. He began his engraving career in the 1830s. He began working for the American Bank Note Company in 1860. His engraving of Thomas Jefferson portrait appeared on the obverse of the United States 1869 United States five-dollar bill known as the "Woodchopper" note. The engraving was based on a painting by Thomas Sully. Henry Gugler engraved the center image on the obverse which portrayed a pioneer family.

Sealy's engravings appear in the design of the 1899 US History Instructing Youth $1 silver certificate. The reverse of the note features portraits of George and Martha Washington. In 1878, Charles Burt engraved the portrait of Martha and in 1867 Alfred Sealey engraved the portrait of George.
