= Charles Louis Hinton =

American painter, illustrator, educator (1869–1950)

- Born: 1869; Ithaca, New York, U.S.
- Died: October 12, 1950 (aged 80–81); Bronxville, New York, U.S.
- Burial place: Kensico Cemetery
- Other name: C. L. Hinton
- Education: National Academy of Design, Académie Julian, École des Beaux-Arts
- Occupations: Painter, sculptor, illustrator, educator, medalist, muralist
- Spouse: Grace Ann Boyce
- Children: 3

Charles Louis Hinton (1869 – October 12, 1950) was an American painter, sculptor, illustrator, and educator. He also worked as a medalist and muralist. Hinton taught at the National Academy of Design (1901 to 1948), where he also served as a dean of the fine arts department.

== Early life and education ==
Charles Louis Hinton was born on 1869, in Ithaca, New York. His father Louis J. Hinton was from England and was an artistan stone carver, who came to the United States to work at Cornell University. Hinton was raised in England.

While attending the National Academy of Design in New York City, Hinton won a scholarship to travel and studied at the Académie Julian and the École des Beaux-Arts in Paris. His teachers included Jean-Léon Gérôme and William-Adolphe Bouguereau.

For a decade he shared an art studio in New York City with his former mentor, Will Hicok Low.

== Career ==
Under The Tree (1902) written by Hamilton Wright Mabie, and illustrated by Hinton

Hinton's notable sculptures include the plaster Henry Hudson Statue (1909) for the Hudson–Fulton Celebration in New York City, and Columbia's Call To Arms (1917). He designed a number of medals, including the Lincoln Medal given by Ford's Theatre Society, and the Charles A. Lindbergh Medal of Congress.

Hinton's murals include the Orphans' Court in Wilkes-Barre, Pennsylvania, and the Second National Bank also in Wilkes-Barre, Pennsylvania.

His illustrations were part of the publications, Under the Trees (1891) by Hamilton Wright Mabie, and Emmy Lou: Her Book and Heart (1902) by George Madden Martin.

Hinton taught at the National Academy of Design from 1901 until 1948, where he also served as a dean of the fine arts department starting in 1940. He also taught at Cooper Union School of Art from 1912 to 1932, and New York University from 1924 to 1929.

He was a member of the Architectural League of New York, the National Society of Mural Painters, the National Sculpture Society and the Century Association.

== Death and legacy ==
Hinton died at age 80 on October 12, 1950, at Lawrence Hospital (now NewYork-Presbyterian Westchester) in Bronxville, New York. He was survived by his wife Grace Ann Boyce, and their 3 children.

His work is in museum collections, including at the Smithsonian American Art Museum in Washington, D.C., the Dayton Art Institute in Ohio, and the Metropolitan Museum of Art in New York City.

== List of illustrations ==
- Mabie, Hamilton Wright. Under the Trees and Elsewhere (1891). C. L. Hinton (illustrator). New York City, NY: Dodd, Mead and Company.
- Mabie, Hamilton Wright (1901). A Child of Nature. Charles Louis Hinton (illustrator). New York City, NY: Dodd, Mead and Company.
- Martin, George Madden (1902). Emmy Lou: Her Book and Heart. Charles Louis Hinton (illustrator). New York City, NY: McClure, Phillips and Company.
