= Eva Anne Madden =

American journalist

Eva Anne Madden (October 26, 1863 – January 22, 1958) was an American educator, journalist, playwright, and author. She was one of the first women newspaper journalists of New York City.

== Biography ==
Eva Anne Madden was born in Trimble County, Kentucky, near Bedford, October 26, 1863. She was the daughter of Frank and Anne Louise (Mackenzie), and the elder sister of Mrs. George Madden Martin.

Madden was educated in the public schools (ward, high) of Louisville, Kentucky, after which she took a Normal course.

She wrote a bit at the age of 14 for the Louisville Courier-Journal and at the age of 16, began to review books for the Louisville Post. At the age of 18, she began teaching in public schools. In 1892, Madden went to New York City, and engaged in newspaper work. Since 1901, she resided abroad. From 1907, she served as the Italian representative of Curtis, Brown & Massie, of London. From 1908, she was the Florence, Italy, correspondent and Paris, France, editor of the New York Herald

Madden was the author of a group of popular stories for children. Her first book, Stephen, or the Little Crusaders (New York, 1901), was published only a few months before she sailed for Europe, where she resided for many years. Madden's The I Can School (New York, 1902), was followed by her other books, The Little Queen (Boston, 1903); The Soldiers of the Duke (Boston, 1904); and Two Royal Foes (New York, 1907). She had a very good short-story in The Century Magazine for February, 1911, entitled "The Interrupted Pen".

== Personal life ==
Madden lived at 36, Via de' Servi, Florence, Italy. Unmarried, she was Episcopalian in religion. Madden died January 22, 1958, in New York City.

== Bibliography ==
- A Noble Spy: An Historical Play for Boys, 1899
- Stephen, or the Little Crusaders, 1901
- The I Can School, 1902
- The Little Queen, 1903
- The Soldiers of the Duke, 1904
- Two Royal Foes, 1907
