= Line engraving =

Engraved images printed on paper

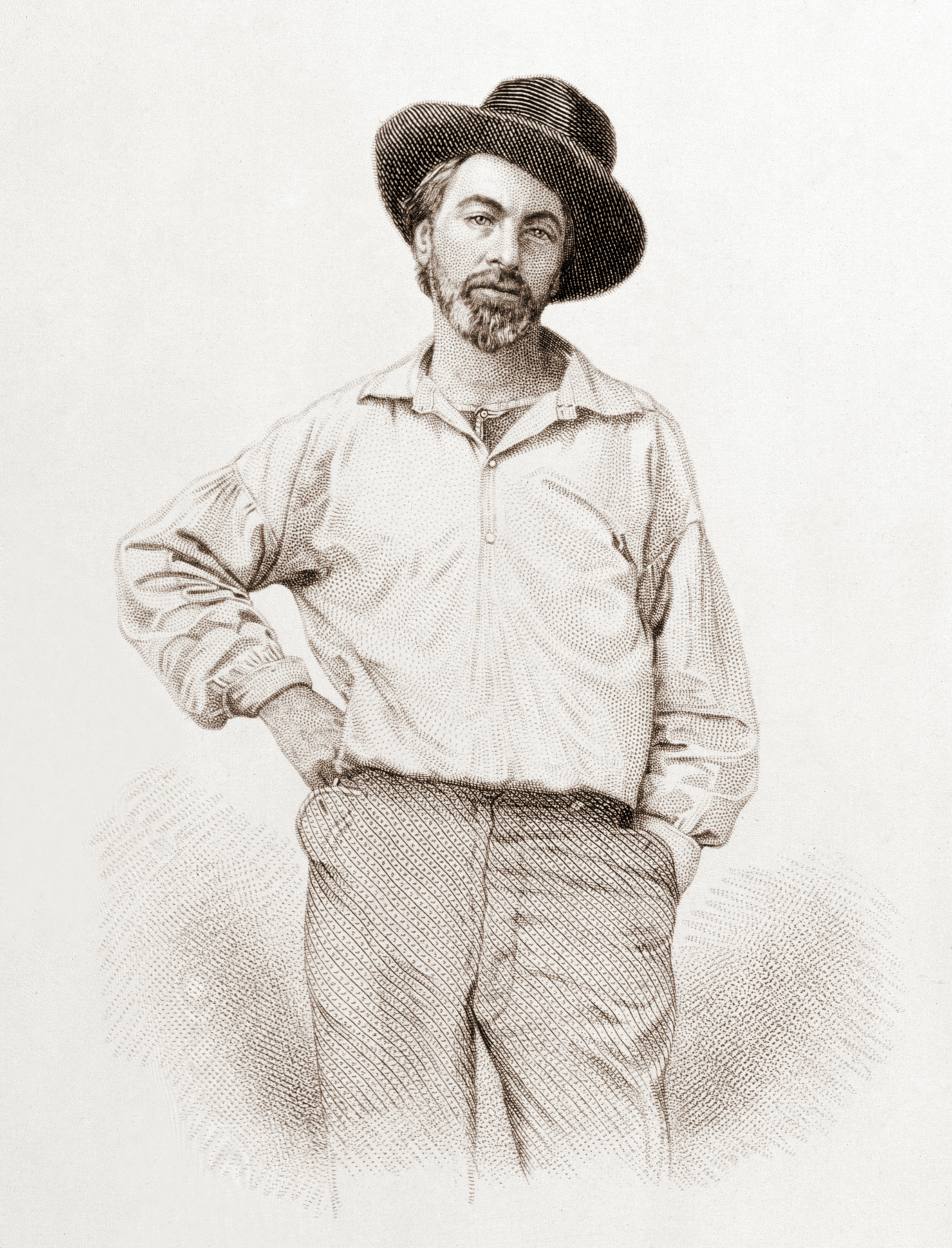
Steel engraving of Walt Whitman, reproducing a photograph, the frontispiece of Leaves of Grass, 1854

Line engraving is a term for engraved images printed on paper to be used as prints or illustrations. The term is mainly used in connection with 18th- or 19th-century commercial illustrations for magazines and books or reproductions of paintings. It is not a technical term in printmaking, and can cover a variety of techniques, giving similar results.

Steel engraving is an overlapping term, for images that in fact are often mainly in etching, mostly used for banknotes, illustrations for books, magazines and decorative prints, often reproductive, from about 1820 to the early 20th century, when the technique became less used. Copperplate engraving is another somewhat outdated term for engravings. With photography long established, engravings made today are nearly all artistic ones in printmaking, but the technique is not as common as it used to be; more than other printmaking techniques, engraving requires great skill and much practice, even for an experienced artist.

== Technique ==
Engraving for the purpose of printmaking creates plates for intaglio printing. Intaglio engravings are made by carving into a plate of a hard substance such as copper, zinc, steel, or plastic. Afterward ink is rubbed into the carved areas and away from the flat surface. Moistened paper is placed over the plate and both are run through the rollers of an intaglio press. The pressure exerted by the press on the paper pushes it into the engraved lines and prints the image made by those lines. In an intaglio print, the engraved lines print black.

Wood engraving is a relief printing technique, with the images made by carving into fine-grained hardwood blocks. Ink is rolled onto the surface of the block, dry paper is placed on top of the block and it is printed either by rolling both through a press, or, by hand, using a baren to rub the ink from the surface of the block onto the paper. In a relief print, the engraved lines show white.

== Early history ==
The art of engraving has been practiced from the earliest ages. The prehistoric Aztec hatchet given to Alexander von Humboldt in Mexico was just as truly engraved as a modern copper-plate which may convey a design by John Flaxman; the Aztec engraving may be less sophisticated than the European, but it is the same art form. Jewelry and many types of fine metal works frequently are engraved as well as furniture. Engraving often is used as an embellishment of knives, swords, guns, and rifles.

=== Niellos ===
The important discovery which made line engraving one of the multiplying arts was the accidental discovery of how to print an incised line. This method was known for some time before its real utility was realized. The goldsmiths of Florence in the middle of the 15th century ornamented their works by means of engraving, after which they filled up the hollows produced by the burin with a black enamel-like substance made of silver, lead, and sulfur. The resulting design, called a niello, was much higher in contrast and thus, much more visible.

As this enamel was difficult to remove, goldsmiths developed alternate means of viewing their work while still in progress. They would take a sulfur cast of the work on a matrix of fine clay, and fill up the lines in the sulfur with lampblack, producing the desired high-contrast image.

=== Beginnings of European printmaking ===
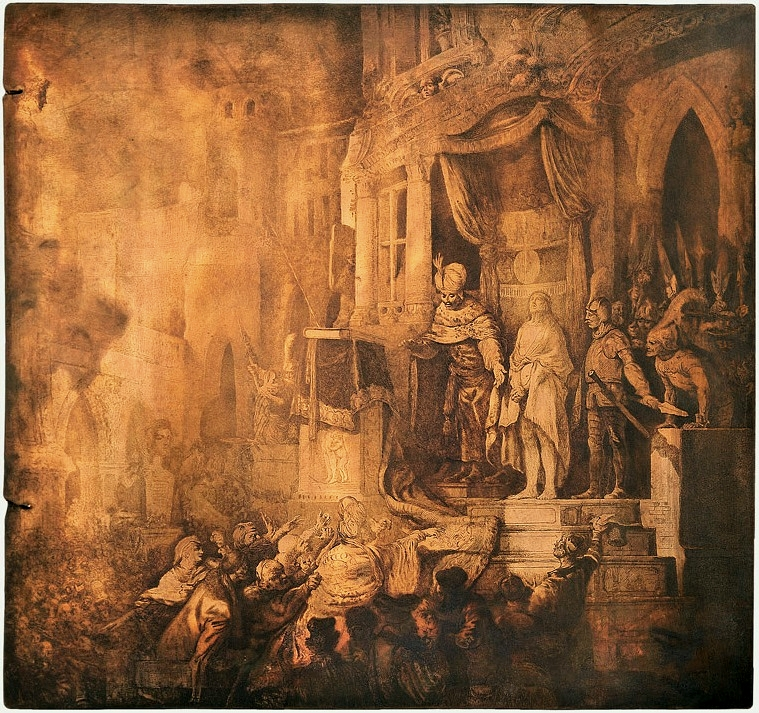
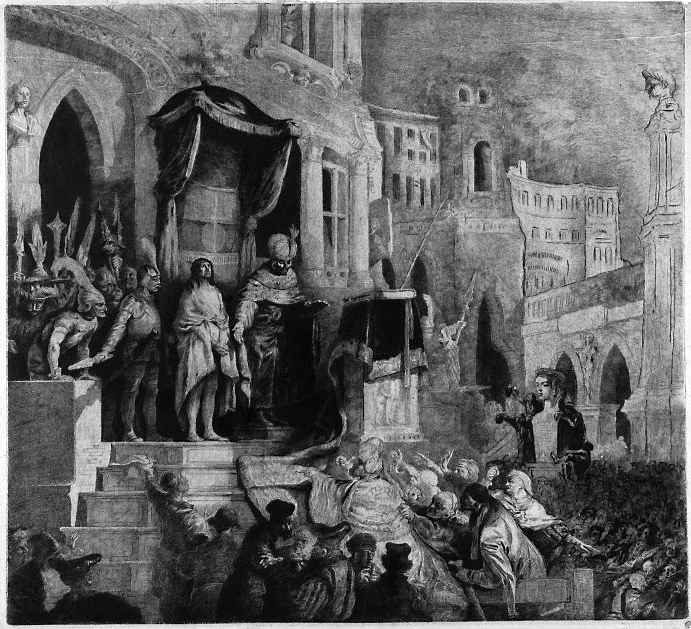
Ecce Homo, ca. 1780, by Jean-Pierre Norblin de La Gourdaine.
Etched copperplate (left), and print obtained as the impression (right). National Museum in Warsaw.

It was discovered later that a proof could be taken on damped paper by filling the engraved lines with ink and wiping it off the surface of the plate. Pressure was then applied to push the paper into the hollowed lines and draw the ink out of them. This was the beginning of plate printing.

This convenient way of proofing a niello saved the effort of producing a cast, but further implications went unexplored. Although goldsmiths continued to engrave nielli to ornament plates and furniture, it was not until the late 15th century that the new method of printing was implemented.

=== Early style ===
In early Italian and German prints, the line is used with such perfect simplicity of purpose that the methods of the artists are as obvious as if we saw them actually at work. In all these figures the outline is the primary focus, followed by the lines which mark the leading folds of the drapery. These are always engravers' lines, such as may be made naturally with the burin, and they never imitate the freer line of the pencil or etching needle.

Shading is used in the greatest moderation with thin straight strokes that never overpower the stronger organic lines of the design. In early metal engraving the shading lines are often cross-hatched. In the earliest woodcuts they are not. The reason being that when lines are incised, they may as easily be crossed, as not. Whereas when they are reserved, the crossing involves much non-artistic labor.

==== Italy ====
The early style of Italian engravers differs greatly from that of a modern chiaroscurist. Mantegna, for example, did not draw and shade at the same time. He got his outlines and the patterns on his dresses all very accurate initially. Then he added a veil of shading with all the lines being straight and all the shading diagonal. This is the primitive method, its peculiarities being due to a combination of natural genius with technical inexperience.

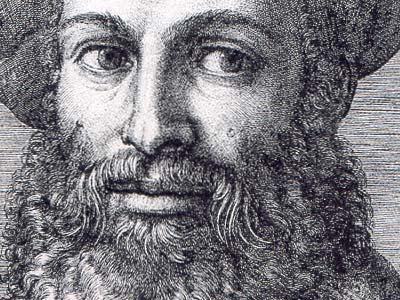
Detail of an engraving by Marcantonio

Marcantonio, the engraver trained by Raphael, first practiced by copying German woodcuts into line engravings. Marcantonio became an engraver of remarkable power and through him, the pure art of line-engraving reached its maturity. He retained much of the simple early Italian manner in his backgrounds. His figures are modeled boldly in curved lines, crossing each other in the darker shades, but left single in the passages from dark to light and breaking away in fine dots as they approach the light itself, which is of pure white paper. A new Italian school of engraving was born, which put aside minute details for a broad, harmonious treatment.

==== Germany ====
The characteristics of early metal engraving in Germany are demonstrated in the works of Martin Schongauer (d. 1488) and Albrecht Dürer (d. 1528). Schongauer used outline and shade as a unified element, and the shading, generally in curved lines. His skill is far more masterly than the straight shading of Mantegna. Dürer continued Schongauer's curved shading, with increasing manual delicacy and skill, and over-loaded his plates with quantities of living and inanimate objects. He applied the same intensity of study to every art form he explored.

Peter Paul Rubens and the engravers he employed, made marked technical developments in the field of engraving. Instead of his finished paintings, Rubens provided his engravers with drawings as guides, allowing them to discard the Italian outline method and in its place substitute modeling. They substituted broad masses for the minutely-finished detail of the northern schools, and adopted a system of a dark and light characteristic of engraving, which reportedly Rubens stated, rendered the detail as more harmonious.

== 17th and 18th centuries ==
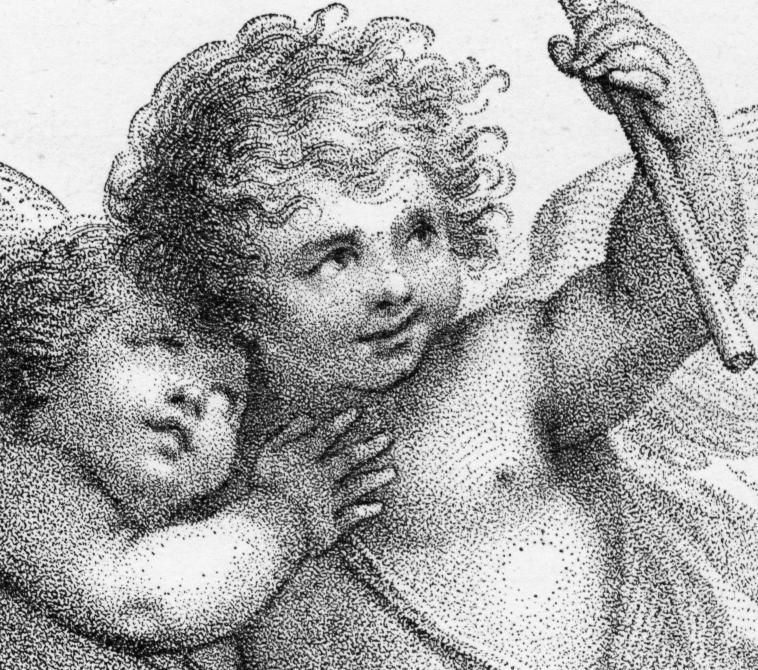
An example of stipple engraving, using tiny dots to create soft tonal effects, by Francesco Bartolozzi

In the 17th and 18th centuries, line engraving made no new development. Instead, it flourished around the established techniques and principles. English and French artists began to use the technique, with the English learning primarily from the Germans (led by Rubens), and the French from the Italians (Raphael). There was, however, a good deal of cross-influence among all involved traditions.

Sir Robert Strange, as many other English engravers, made it his study to soften and lose the outline, specifically in figure-engraving. Meanwhile, Gerard Audran (d. 1703) led the Renaissance school in perfecting the art of modeling with the burin.

== 19th century ==
In the 19th century, line engraving was both helped and hindered. Help came from the growth of public wealth, increasing interest in art, and the increase in the commerce of art—as exemplified by the career of such art dealers as Ernest Gambart—and the growing demand for illustrated books. Hindrance to line engraving came from the desire for cheaper and more rapid methods – a desire satisfied in various ways, but especially, by etching and various kinds of photography.

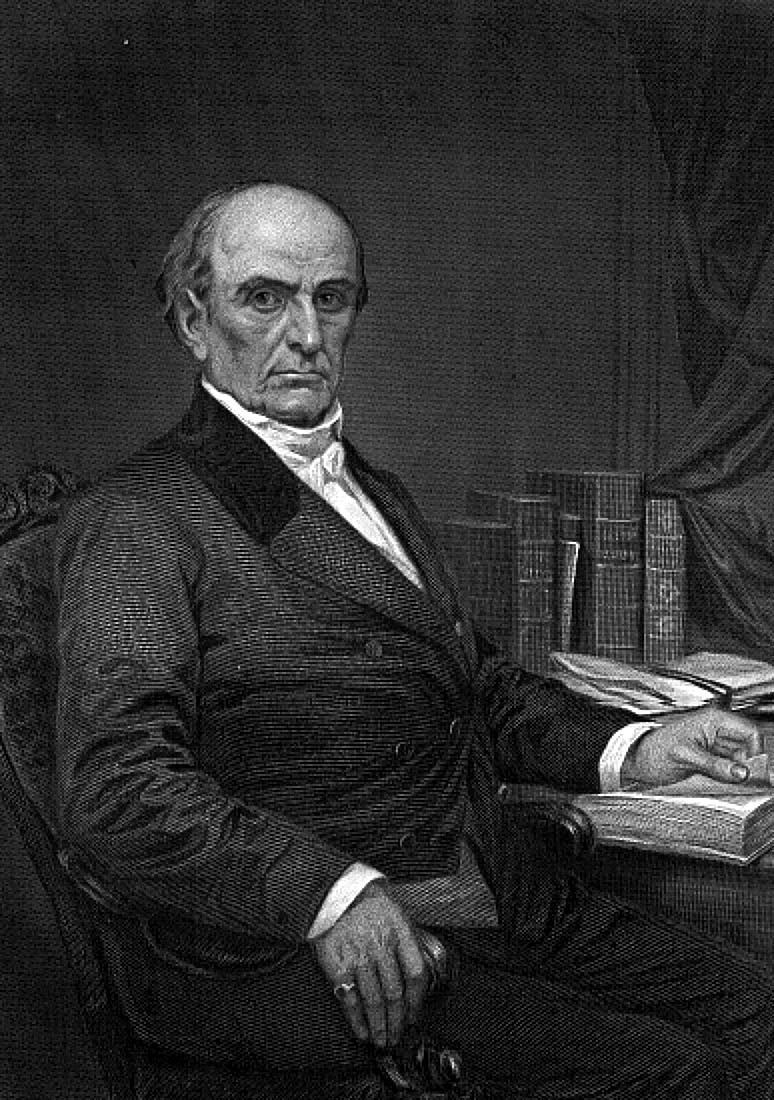
An engraved portrait of Daniel Webster by Duyckinick, 1873

The history of the art of line engraving during the last quarter of the 19th century, is one of continued decay. By the beginning of the 20th century, pictorial line engraving in England was practically non-existent. The disappearance of the art is due to the fact that the public refused to wait for several years for proofs (some important proofs took as long as 12 years to create) when they could obtain their plates more quickly by other methods. The invention of steel-facing S copper plate enabled the engraver to proceed more quickly; but even in this case he can no more compete with the etcher than the mezzotint engraver can keep pace with the photogravure manufacturer.

Line-engraving flourished in France until the early 20th century, only through official encouragement and intelligent fostering by collectors and connoisseurs. The class of the work changed, however, partly through the reduction of prices paid for it, partly through the change of taste and fashion, and partly, again, through the necessities of the situation. French engravers were driven to simplify their work in order to satisfy public impatience. To compensate for loss of color, the art developed in the direction of elegance and refinement.

In Italy, line engraving decayed just as it had in England, and outside Europe, line engraving seems to have been almost nonexistent. There were still a few who could engrave a head from a photograph or drawing, or a small engraving for book illustration or for book plates; there were more who were highly proficient in mechanical engraving for decorative purposes, but the engraving machine was quickly superseding this class.

=== Style ===
Nineteenth-century line engraving, compared with previous work, had a more thorough and delicate rendering of local color, light and shade, and texture. Older engravers could draw just as correctly, but they either neglected these elements or admitted them sparingly, as opposed to the spirit of their art, but there is a certain sameness in pure line engraving that is more favorable to some forms and textures than to others.

In the well-known prints from Rosa Bonheur, for example, the tone of the skies is achieved by machine-ruling, as is much undertone in the landscape. The fur of the animals is all etched, as are the foreground plants; the real burin work is used sparingly where most favorable to texture. Even in the exquisite engravings after J. M. W. Turner, which reached a degree of delicacy in light and shade far surpassing the work of the old masters, the engravers had recourse to etching, finishing with the burin and dry point. Considered as important an influence upon engraving as Raphael and Rubens, Turner contributed much to the field in the direction of delicacy of tone.

The new French school of engraving had several distinctive characteristics, including the substitution of exquisite greys for the rich blacks of old and, simplicity of method coupled with extremely high elaboration. Their object is, as always, to secure the faithful transcript of the painter they reproduce while readily sacrificing the power of the old method, which, whatever its force and beauty, was easily acquired by mediocre artists of technical ability. The Belgian school of engraving elaborated an effective "mixed method" of graver-work and dry-point. The Stauffer-Bern method of using many fine lines to create tone had a certain advantage in modeling.

== Line engraving in the 20th century ==
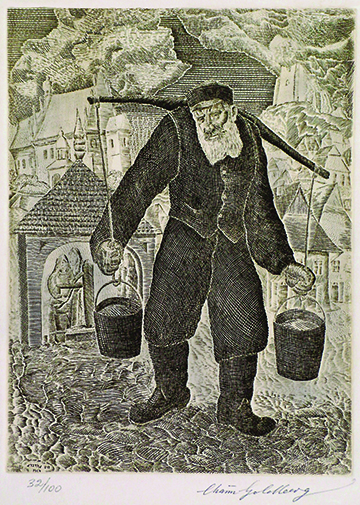
The Water Carrier by CHAIM GOLDBERG

From 1960 to 1977, the artist Chaim Goldberg continued the tradition of engraving in steel, copper and brass plates. His focus was the detailing of Jewish life in the small villages of Eastern Europe. He began while employed by the Israeli Minit in Tel Aviv in an experiment to create state engraved stamps. His first plate which he engraved using an old-fashioned burin was an image of a typical village wedding. The scene was crowded by thirty-some figures fashioned in a composition inspired by his oil painting The Wedding, collection of the Spertus University, Chicago. His second was of a water carrier who would deliver water to the homes for two bits. Later, the artist created a whole suite of engravings with the central theme of shtetl Life. The engravings were exhibited in a solo exhibition at the Smithsonian Institution, Washington DC, in 1973 titled "Chaim Goldberg's Shtetl". He continued to engrave and in later years he created a series dedicated to modern dance. Samples can be seen with his most significant being a collection of 6 engravings titled "Spring."

== Modern and contemporary art ==
Although dwindled to a rarity, modern engravers continue to practice in the art world, most prominently Andrew Raftery. His choice of subjects is comparable to Hogarth, and his style the French school of elegant and geometrical form.

== Tools of the trade ==
The most important of the tools used in line-engraving is the burin, or graver, a bar of steel with one end fixed in a handle, somewhat resembling a mushroom with one side cut away. The burin is shaped so that the sharpened, cutting end takes the form of a lozenge, and points downward. The burin acts exactly as a plough in the earth: it makes a furrow and turns out a shaving of metal in the same way a plough turns the soil of a field. The burin, unlike a plough, is pushed through the material. This particular characteristic separates it from other instruments employed in the arts of design such as pencils, brushes, pens, and etching needles.

=== Example of burin engraving ===
The elements of engraving with the burin are evident in the engraving of letters, specifically, the capital letter B. This letter consists of two perpendicular straight lines and four distinct curves. The engraver scratches these lines, reversed, very lightly with a sharp point or stylus. Next, the engraver cuts out the blacks (not the whites, as in wood engraving) with two different burins. First, the vertical black line is ploughed with the burin between the two scratched lines, then similarly, some material is removed from the thickest parts of the two curves. Finally, the gradations from the thick middle of the curve to the thin points touching the vertical are worked out with a finer burin.

The hollows are then filled with printing ink, the surplus ink is wiped from the smooth surface of the metal, damped paper is laid upon the surface and driven into the hollowed letter by the pressure of a revolving cylinder. The paper draws out the ink, and the letter B is printed in intense black.

When the surface of a metal plate is sufficiently polished to be used for engraving, the slightest scratch upon it will print as a black line. An engraved plate from which visiting cards are printed is a good example of some elementary principles of engraving. It contains thin lines and thick ones, as well as a considerable variety of curves. An elaborate line engraving, if it is a pure line engraving and nothing else, will contain only these simple elements in different combinations.

== See also ==
- Engraving
- Old master print
- Printmaking
- Steel engraving
