= Will Hicok Low =

American painter (1853–1932)

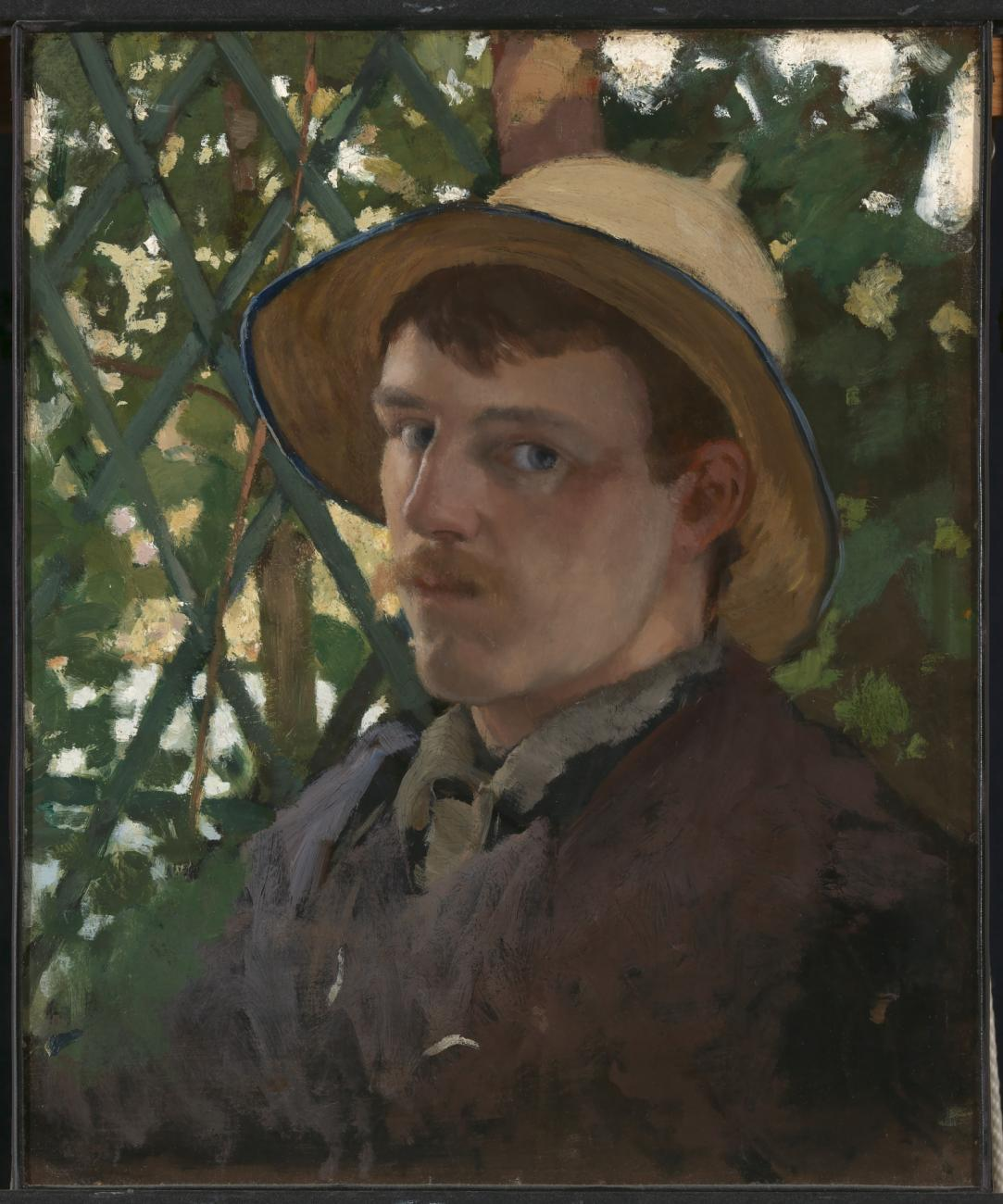
- Self-Portrait at Montigny-sur-Loing, 1876; Smithsonian American Art Museum
- Born: May 31, 1853; Albany, New York, U.S.
- Died: November 27, 1932 (aged 79)
- Occupations: Artist; muralist; writer
- Spouse(s): Berthe Julienne (m. 1878, died) Mary Fairchild (m. 1909)

Will Hicok Low (May 31, 1853 – November 27, 1932) or Will Hicock Low was an American artist, muralist, and writer on art.

== Early life ==
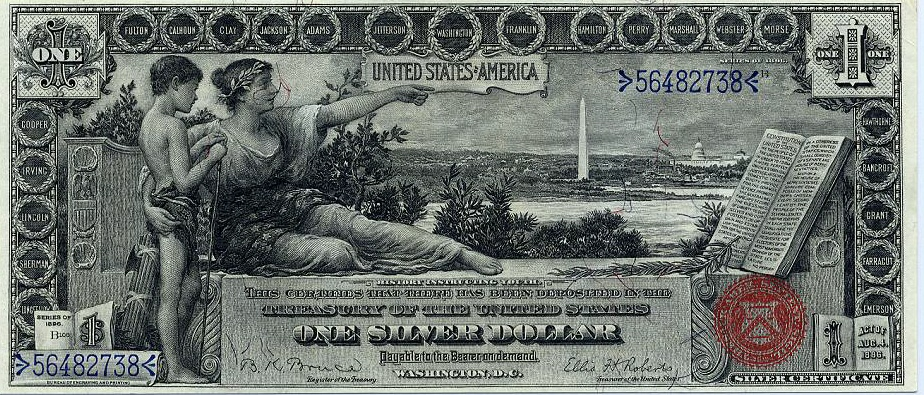
1896 US$1 obverse designed by Low

Low was born in Albany, New York. In 1873 he entered the atelier of Jean-Léon Gérôme in the École des Beaux Arts at Paris, subsequently joining the classes of Carolus-Duran, with whom he remained until 1877. Lengthy and painterly described stays in Barbizon and Montigny-sur-Loing. Returning to New York, he became a member of the Society of American Artists in 1878 and of the National Academy of Design in 1890. His pictures of New England types, and illustrations of John Keats, brought him into prominence.

== Career ==
Low executed panels and medallions for the Waldorf-Astoria Hotel in New York City, a panel for the Essex County Court House in Newark, New Jersey as well as numerous panels for private residences and stained glass windows for various churches, including St. Paul's Methodist Episcopal Church, Newark.

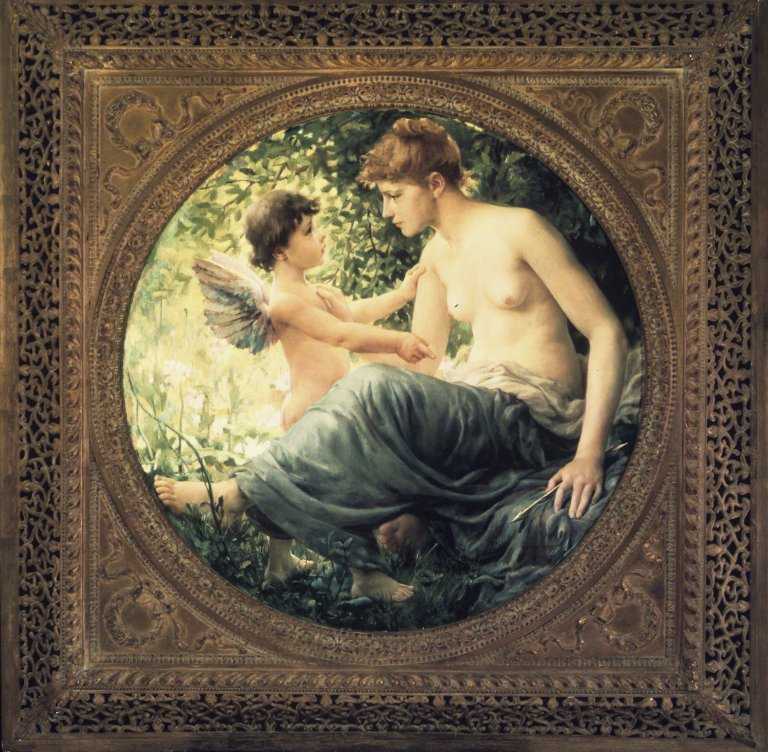
Love Disarmed, 1889. Brooklyn Museum

He was an instructor in the schools of Cooper Union, New York, during 1882 to 1885, and in the school of the National Academy of Design from 1889 to 1892. Low, who is known to a wider circle as the close friend of R. L. Stevenson, published some reminiscences, A Chronicle of Friendships, 1873-1900 (1908). The obverse of the United States silver certificate History Instructing Youth was his work. His design was used for the obverse of the bill and . The engraving for the obverse of the one-dollar History Instructing Youth note was done by Charles Schlecht. In 1896 he began working for American artist John La Farge. He spent two years in New York working for La Farge decorating buildings.

He was a mentor to Charles Louis Hinton, and they shared an art studio together in New York City for over a decade.

Front Matter from "In Arcady" by Hamilton Wright Mabie. Illustrated by Will Hicok Low. Published 1909. Photo by Mr.D.C. Sorensen

After the death of Berthe, in 1909 he married the former Mary Fairchild, the former wife of sculptor Frederick William MacMonnies.

He painted a series of murals in the New York State Education Department rotunda in Albany, New York. Using figures and symbols from Roman and Greek mythology paired with New York buildings and landscapes, the artist charts major milestones in human progress—in terms of art, science, technology, modernization, liberty, democracy, and quality of life. The earliest panels, such as Architecture, Astronomy & Geography, and Medicine & Chemistry, combine theory and practical skills. Another eight, including Theseus, the Pathfinder, feature modern inventions to show how far humankind had progressed by the early 20th century. The final paintings reflect a patriotic theme, with subjects such as The Standard, The United States Military Academy, and the Shaft of Union. Taken together, these paintings—originally gracing the entrances of the State Library Main Reading Room, the Law Library, and the Periodicals Library—complement the Rotunda's architectural nobility and its aura of intellectual enlightenment.
