= Charles Schlecht =

American artist and currency engraver

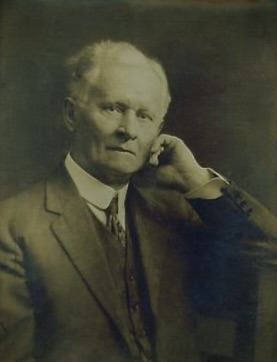
- Born: Stuttgart Germany
- Occupation: Engraver
- Years active: 1859-1905
- Known for: Banknote engraving

Charles Schlecht (1843–1932) was an engraver at the US Bureau of Engraving and Printing. He did the engraving for the 1896 Educational Series one-dollar bill: History Instructing Youth.

== Early life ==
He was born in Stuttgart Germany on June 11, 1843. When he was nine years old he emigrated to the United States with his family. His family settled in New York. In 1859 he began work as an apprentice engraver for the American Banknote Company.

== Career ==
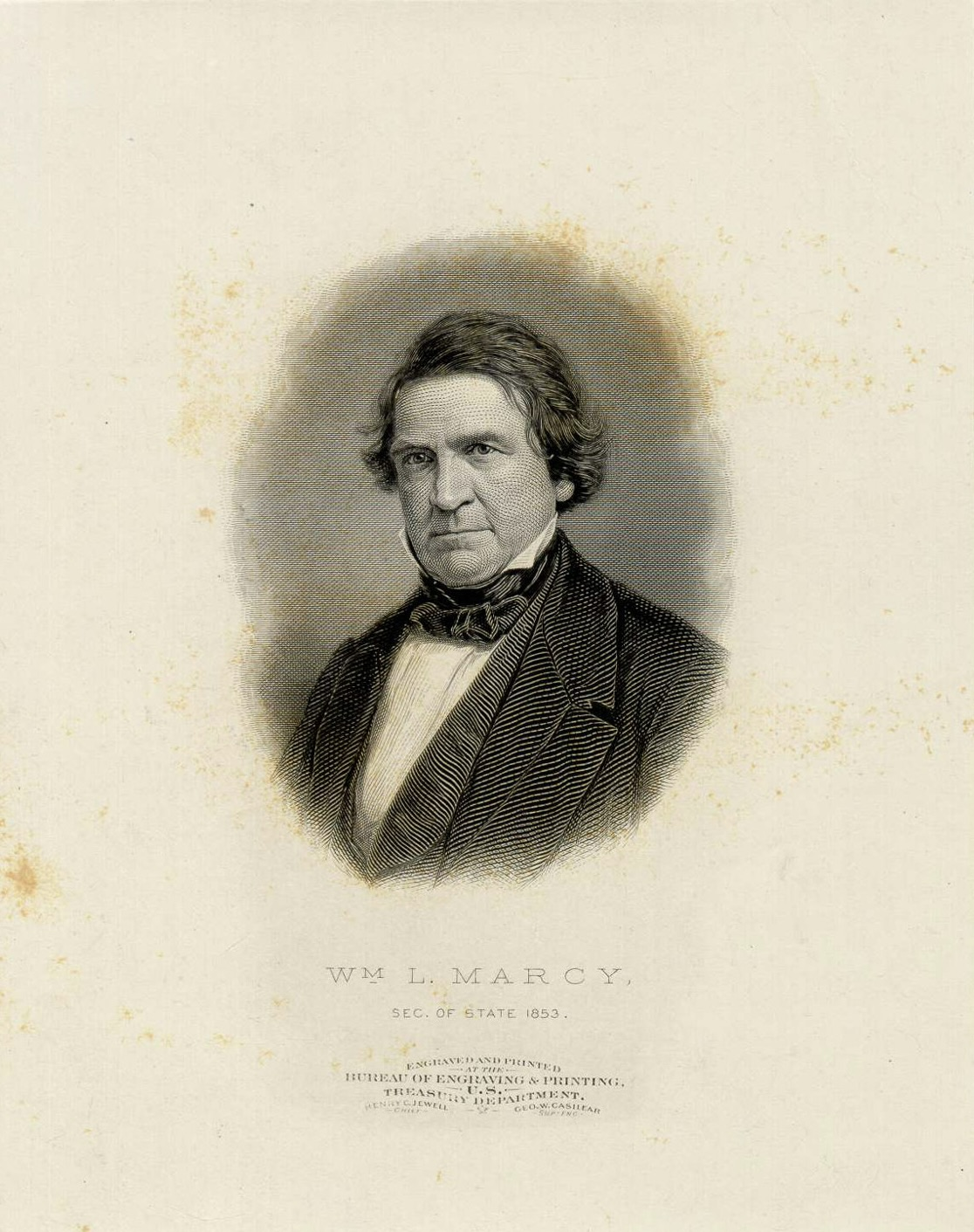
New York Governor William L. Marcy engraving 1891

In addition to producing engravings for currency, he also produced other etchings such as Eyes to the blind and The Wish. He engraved the portrait of New York Governor William L. Marcy for the United States one-thousand-dollar bill. The portrait appeared on the series from 1878-91. One example of a A Series 1891 $1,000 silver certificate sold for US$2.6m in June 2013.

In 1895 his salary at the BEP was $6,000 (equivalent to $232,200 in 2025) per year. He did the engraving for the obverse of the United States one-dollar bill for the 1896 Educational Series: History Instructing Youth.

== See also ==
- Art and engraving on United States banknotes

== Gallery ==
1886 The lost child

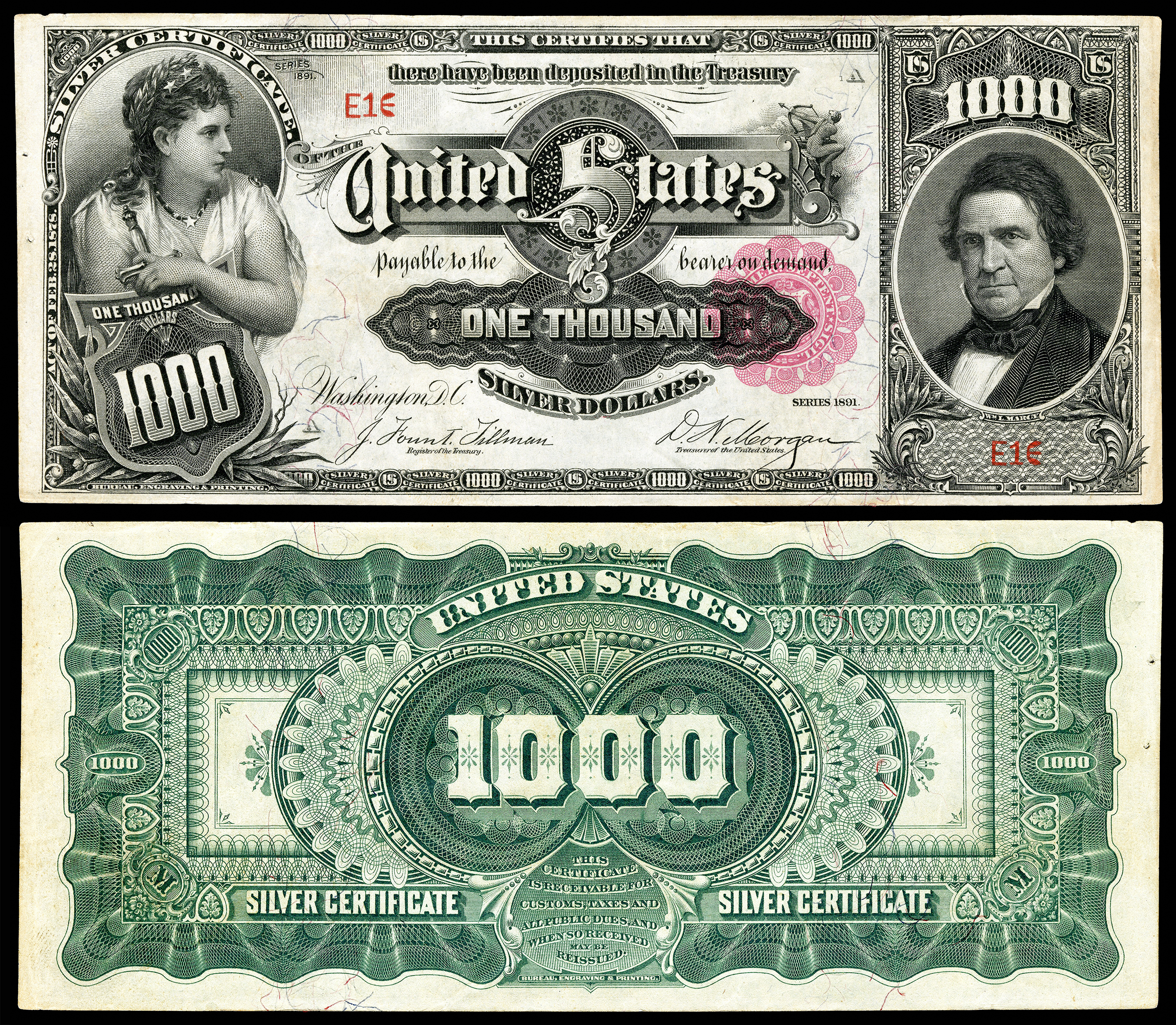
Series 1891 $1000 bill

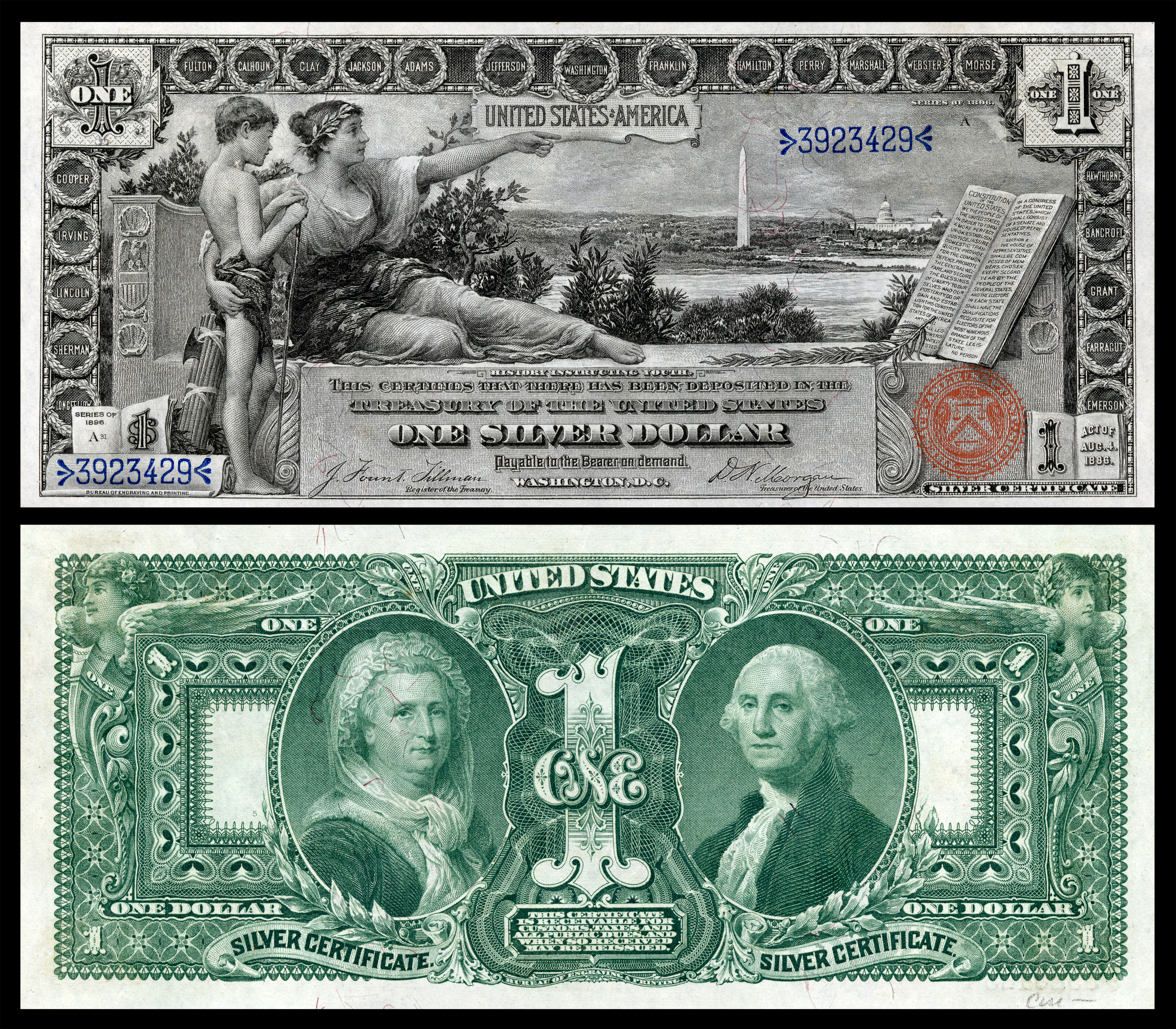
History Instructing Youth

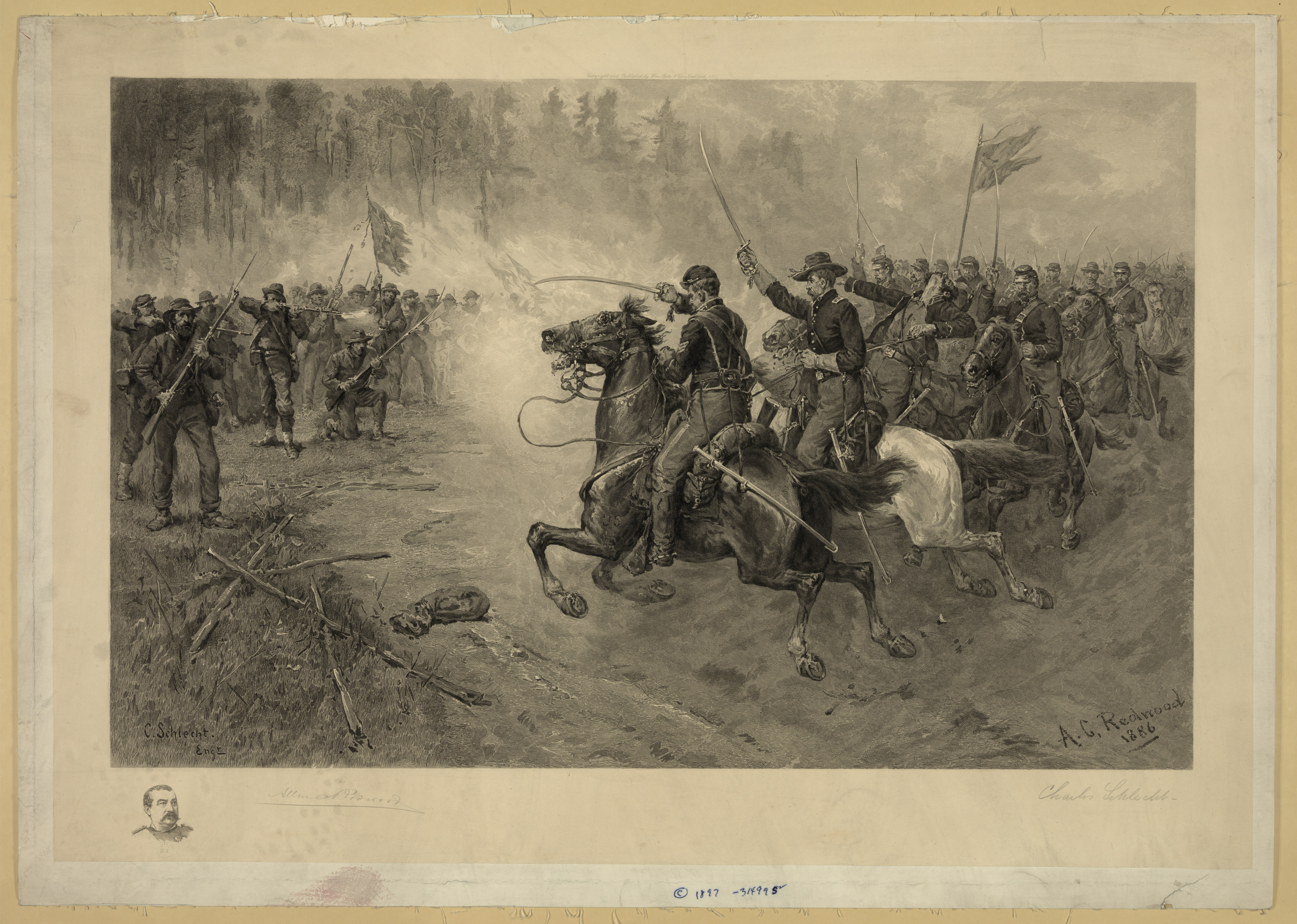
1897 Sheridan's charge
