= Charles Burt =

Charles Kennedy Burt (8 November 1823 – 25 March 1892) was a Scottish-born American artist best known for his line engraving of Abraham Lincoln on the $5 Bill.

== Life ==
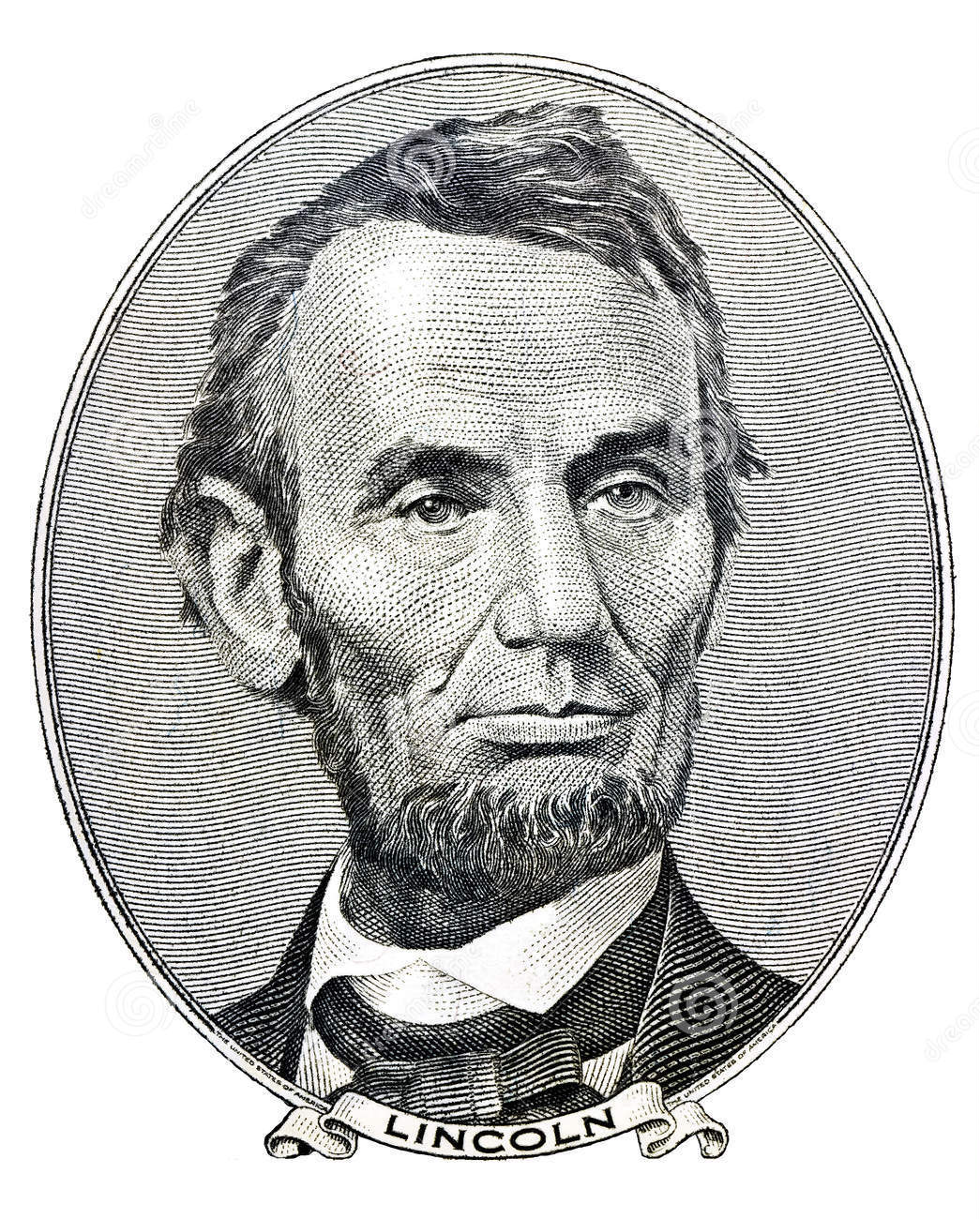
Burt engraved Abraham Lincoln's face for the $100 bill, later used on the $5.

Burt was born in Edinburgh, Scotland, 8 November 1823 to Charles and Jessie (Kennedy) Burt. He showed a gift for drawing at a young age. At the age of 17 he won the student contest for best drawing of the Eddystone lighthouse, drawn from a verbal description: this work was apparently hanging in the halls of Edinburgh high school for many years. While still in Scotland, he was apprenticed to William Home Lizars. He emigrated to New York City in 1836, and went to work for Alexander L. Dick. Under his employ, Burt illustrated many books and engraved a number of portraits. Most of this work during this time is untraceable, as it was all published under Dick's name. It is widely assumed that an acclaimed engraving of Leonardo da Vinci's Last Supper was Burt's handiwork.

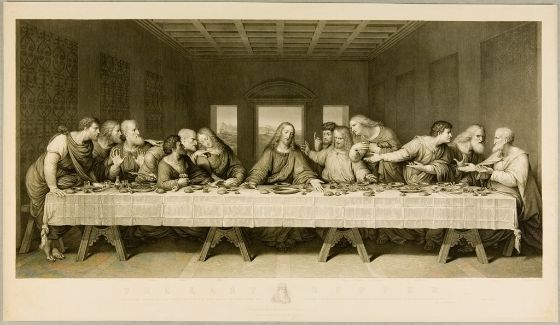
This engraving, printed by Alexander L. Dick is widely believed to be the work of Charles Burt.

As a member of the American Art Union, Burt engraved several signed larger plates including: Sir Walter Raleigh Parting with his Wife (after Emanuel Leutze, 1846); The Signing of the Death Warrant of Lady Jane Grey (after Daniel Huntington, 1848); Anne Page, Slender, and Shallow (after Charles Robert Leslie, 1850); Bargaining for a Horse (after William Sidney Mount, 1851), and Marion Crossing the Pedee (after William Tylee Ranney, 1851).

Burt is most remembered as one of the principal engravers for the U.S. Treasury Department. He engraved Lincoln's portrait for the $100 bill in 1869. (This image remained on other large notes until 1928 when currency was reduced to the smaller size in use today: Lincoln's portrait remained on the $5 Federal Reserve Note until 2000). After 1850, Burt's focus was mainly on banknote engraving, which he was to do for over thirty years on behalf of the U.S. Treasury. He also engraved plates for postage stamps for Canada, Brazil, Italy, Russia and Chile, among others.

Burt was married on 3 June 1844 in Rockaway, New Jersey, to Margaret, daughter of Thomas Sargeant. He lived most of his life in Brooklyn and died there on 25 March 1892, survived by his wife, one son and seven daughters.
