= List of coin collectors =

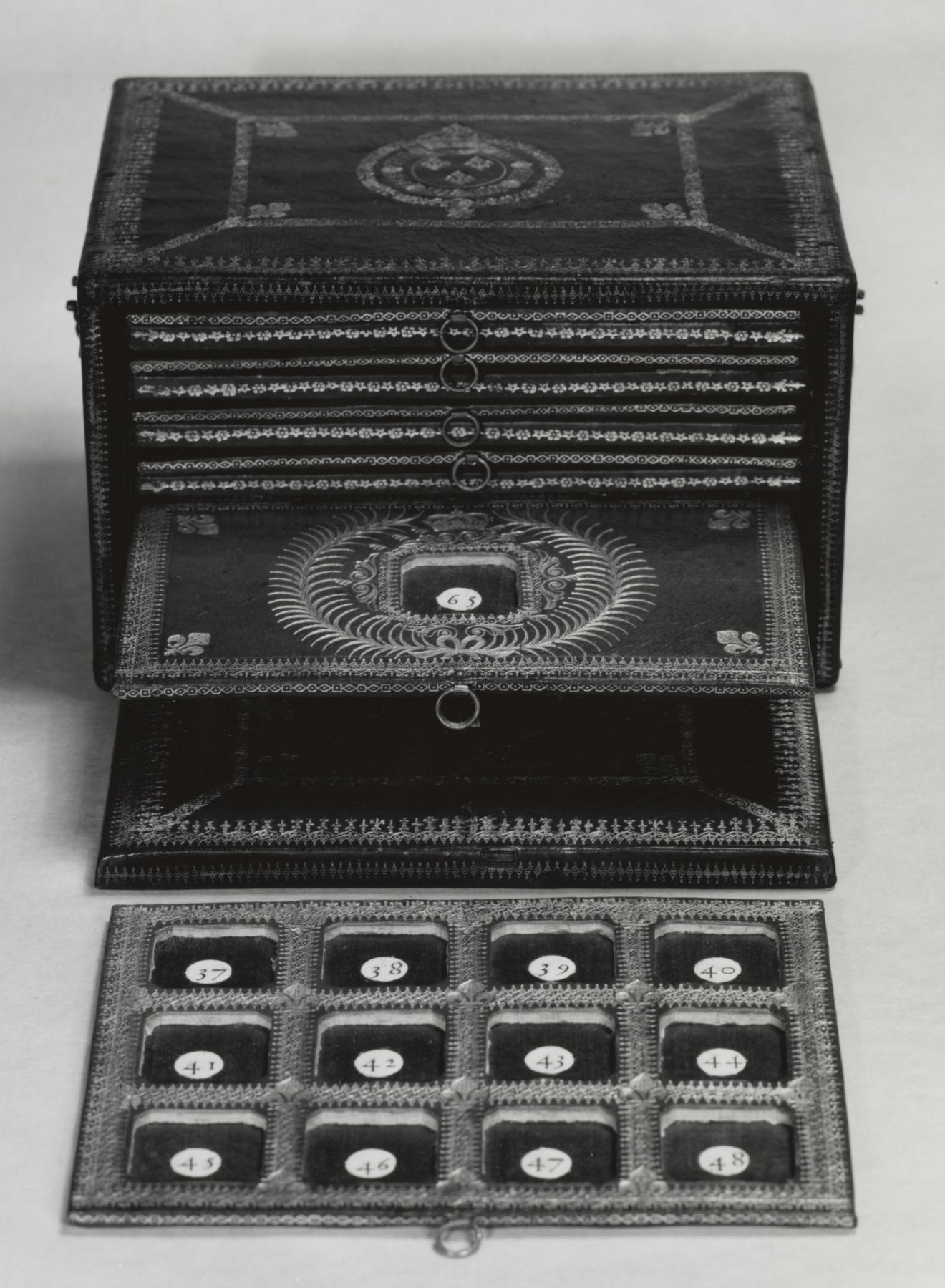
Coin cabinet with the royal arms of Louis XIV.

The first coin collector is said to have been Augustus. During the Renaissance, it became a fad among some members of the privileged classes, especially kings and queens.

A coin collector is different from a numismatist, which is someone who studies coins. Many collectors are also numismatists, but some are not. Likewise, not all numismatists collect coins themselves.

Collector	Born	Died	Notes	Reference
Caesar Augustus	63 BC	14 AD	According to Suetonius, he gave "coins of every device, including old pieces of the kings and foreign money" as Saturnalia gifts.	
Theodora Porphyrogenita	c. 980	1056	Owned a large collection of ancient coins and medals which she kept in custom-made bronze cabinets and happily accepted new additions as presents.	
Pope Boniface VIII	1230	1303		
Giovanni Mansionario		1337	Collected Roman imperial coins	
Francesco Petrarch	1304	1374	Presented some of his Roman coins to Emperor Charles IV	
Francesco I da Carrara	1325	1393	Collected Roman imperial coins	
Jean, duc de Berry	1340	1416	Commissioned copies of the medals in his collection	
Alfonso V of Aragon	1396	1458	Had a collection of ancient coins which had been discovered in Italy; carried them with him in an ivory cabinet	
Leonello d'Este	1407	1450	Collected Greek and Roman coins	
Pope Paul II	1417	1471	Collected ancient coins, and had about a hundred gold and a thousand silver coins; "was able at a glance to tell where an ancient coin came from"	
Julius Pomponius Laetus	1428	1498		
Matthias Corvinus	1443	1490		
Lorenzo de' Medici	1449	1492	Purchased coins that had been in Pope Paul II's collection	
Maximilian I	1459	1519		
Guillaume Budé	1467	1540	Wrote De Asse et Partibus Eius (1514) on Roman coins and measures	
Cuthbert Tunstall	1474	1559		
Ferdinand I	1503	1564	Collected Roman coins	
Joachim II Hector, Elector of Brandenburg	1505	1571	Established the Berlin Coin Cabinet	
Catherine Parr	1512	1548		
Andrew Perne	1519	1589	Bequeathed his collection to the Fitzwilliam Museum	
Alessandro Farnese	1520	1589	Owner of the Farnese collection	
Albert V, Duke of Bavaria	1528	1579	Collection is in the Bavarian State Coin Collection	
Ferdinand II, Archduke of Austria	1529	1595	The cabinets in which he stored his coins are today kept in the Vienna Coin Cabinet and at Ambras Castle	
Abraham Gorlaeus	1549	1608	His collection of 30,000 coins and medals was purchased by Henry Frederick, Prince of Wales	
Wenceslas Cobergher	1560	1634	Collected Roman coins	
Robert Cotton	1571	1631	Collection is in the British Museum	
Henry Frederick, Prince of Wales	1594	1612	Purchased Abraham Gorlaeus' collection	
Ernest I, Duke of Saxe-Gotha	1601	1675		
John Greaves	1602	1652	Left his coins, "which he had collected in Italy and the East," to Sir John Marsham	
Christina, Queen of Sweden	1626	1689	Had a collection of more than 15,000 coins; marked her coins with a monogram stamp	
Louis XIV of France	1638	1715	Said to have instructed his ambassadors to look out for ancient coins.	
Jacob de Wilde	1645	1721		
Frederick I, Duke of Saxe-Gotha-Altenburg	1646	1691	His diaries reveal that he "enjoyed making an inventory of his coins and arranging them in order"	
Antoine Galland	1646	1715	Purchased ancient coins on his visits to the Middle East	
Anton Günther II, Count of Schwarzburg-Sondershausen-Arnstadt	1653	1716	Sold his collection to raise the money needed to become an Imperial Prince	
Thomas Herbert, 8th Earl of Pembroke	1656	1733	Collection auctioned in 1848 with 1500 lots	
Hans Sloane	1660	1753	Collection is in the British Museum	
Roger Gale	1672	1744	Bequeathed his collection to the Fitzwilliam Museum	
Richard Mead	1653	1754	Collection auctioned in 1755	
Frederick II, Duke of Saxe-Gotha-Altenburg	1676	1732	Purchased collection of Anton Günther II, Count of Schwarzburg-Sondershausen-Arnstadt	
George II of Great Britain	1683	1760	Purchased Andrew Gifford's collection	
William Stukeley	1687	1765		
Edward Harley, 2nd Earl of Oxford and Earl Mortimer	1689	1741	Collected Greek, Roman and English coins; collection auctioned in 1742	
Joseph Ames	1689	1759		
Martin Folkes	1690	1754	Collection auctioned in 1756	
Thomas Martin of Palgrave	1697	1771		
William Richardson	1698	1775	Collected British, Roman, and English coins	
Andrew Gifford	1700	1784	Collection purchased by George II	
Pieter Teyler van der Hulst	1702	1778	Collection formed the basis of the Coin and Medal Room of the Teylers Museum	
George North	1707	1772	Collected English coins	
Francis I	1708	1765	His collecting emphasized modern coins	
Louis Günther II, Prince of Schwarzburg-Rudolstadt	1708	1790		
Andrew Ducarel	1713	1785	Collection auctioned in 1785	
Charlotte Sophie of Aldenburg	1715	1800	Collected Greek and Roman coins	
Andrew Eliot	1718	1778	Collected New England silver coins	
William Hunter	1718	1783	Established the Hunter Coin Cabinet in the University of Glasgow	
Charles Watson-Wentworth, 2nd Marquess of Rockingham	1730	1782	Collected Roman imperial coins	
Oluf Gerhard Tychsen	1734	1815	Wrote Introductio in rem numariam muhammedanorum in 1794, the first scholarly manual of Islamic numismatics	
Pierre Eugene du Simitiere	1737	1784	Collection auctioned in 1785, making it the earliest known coin auction sale in the United States	
Archduchess Maria Anna of Austria	1738	1789	Inherited her love of numismatics from her father, Emperor Francis I	
George III of the United Kingdom	1738	1820	Contributed to the collection in the Hunter Coin Cabinet	
Johan Frans Podolyn	1739	1784	Collection of more than 6000 coins	
Thomas Jefferson	1743	1826	Acquired contemporary European issues through his travels abroad	
Sarah Sophia Banks	1744	1818	Collection shared between the British Museum and the Royal Mint Museum	
Kutsuki Masatsuna	1750	1802	Collection now in the British Museum and the Ashmolean Museum	
Jacob Georg Christian Adler	1756	1834	Collection is in the University of Rostock	
John Quincy Adams	1767	1848	Collection auctioned by the Massachusetts Historical Society in 1971	
Princess Augusta Sophia of the United Kingdom	1768	1840	Collected English and German coins	
John Rushout, 2nd Baron Northwick	1770	1859	Collected Greek coins	
George Robert Ainslie	1776	1839	Wrote Illustrations of the Anglo-French Coinage in 1830	
William Martin Leake	1777	1860	Collection purchased for £5,000 in 1864 by the Fitzwilliam Museum	
August Otto Rühle von Lilienstern	1780	1847	Collection is in the Oriental Coin Cabinet Jena	
James Dodsley Cuff	1780	1853	His collection of British coins took 18 days to auction	
John Doherty	1785	1850		
Christian VIII of Denmark	1786	1848	Collection is in the National Museum of Denmark	
Joaquín Rubio y Muñoz	1788	1874	Collection is in the National Museum of Denmark and the National Archaeological Museum of Spain	
Caspar Reuvens	1793	1835	Collection is in the Rijksmuseum van Oudheden	
Claude Auguste Court	1793	1880	One of the first Europeans to become interested in the coins of South Asia	
Frédéric Soret	1795	1865	Collection is in the Oriental Coin Cabinet Jena and the Bavarian State Coin Collection	
John Gardner Wilkinson	1797	1875	Bequeathed his collection to Harrow School	
Heinrich Leberecht Fleischer	1801	1888	Collection is in the Deutsche Morgenländische Gesellschaft	
Pieter Otto van der Chijs	1802	1867	Director of the coin cabinet of the Rijksmuseum van Oudheden	
Louis Félicien de Saulcy	1807	1880	Collected Jewish coins obtained during his travels in Palestine; wrote Recherches sur la numismatique judaïque (1854), illustrated with coins from his collection	
Ernst Heinrich Meier	1813	1866	Collection purchased by the University of Tübingen	
Edward Clive Bayley	1821	1884	Collected Indian coins	
Hermann Weber	1823	1918	Collected Greek coins	
Grand Duke Konstantin Nikolayevich of Russia	1827	1892	Collected Russian coins	
Byron Reed	1829	1891	Bequeathed his collection to the city of Omaha, where it resides in the Durham Museum	
Adriaan Justus Enschedé	1829	1896	Bequeathed his collection to the Teylers Museum	
Emily Bayley	1830	1911	Collection of Indian copper coins is in the British Museum	
Georg Bühler	1837	1898	Collection is in the Bode Museum	
Frank John Joseph	1838	1895	Reportedly had one of the finest private collections of coins and medals in North America, worth an estimated $30000 at his death	
José Gerson da Cunha	1844	1900	Collection included more than 27,000 pieces	
Prince Philipp of Saxe-Coburg and Gotha	1844	1921	Collection auctioned in 1928	
Gustave Schlumberger	1844	1929	Collected Crusader coins	
Samuel Mills Damon	1845	1924	Collection auctioned in 2006 for $3.9 million	
Robert Wallace McLachlan	1845	1926	The "Dean" of Canadian numismatics and VP of American Numismatic Association. Collection acquired by Chateau de Ramezay in Montreal and later most of it by Bank of Canada Museum	
Samuel Jean de Pozzi	1846	1918	Collection auctioned in 1921	
Gerald Ephraim Hart	1849	1936	Formed several outstanding collections of Canadian coins, tokens, medals, books and historical documents prior to 1900	
Francis W. Doughty	1850	1917	Collection auctioned in 1891 with 1539 lots	
Heinrich von Siebold	1852	1908	Collection is in the Oriental Coin Cabinet Jena	
Lars Emil Bruun	1852	1923	Most valuable collection of world coins and medals insured for $72,550,000	
Eduard Glaser	1855	1908	Collection is in the Bode Museum	
Ivan Ivanovich Tolstoy	1858	1916	Collection auctioned in 1913	
George Hubbard Clapp	1858	1949	Donated collection of 1543 large cents to the American Numismatic Society	
Milan Rešetar	1860	1942	Inherited and expanded his father's coin collection; wrote the two-volume Dubrovačka numizmatika	
Henry A. Greene	1861	1950	Collection of Greek coins purchased by the Rhode Island School of Design Museum in 1940	
Grand Duke George Mikhailovich of Russia	1863	1919	Portion of collection is in the Smithsonian Institution	
Ernest Robinson Ackerman	1863	1931	Collection auctioned in 1931	
Frederick Parkes Weber	1863	1962	Inherited an interest in coin collecting from his father, Sir Hermann Weber	
William A. Ashbrook	1867	1940	Majority of his collection stolen in 1919	
William H. Woodin	1868	1934	Collected pattern coins	
Edward Howland Robinson Green	1868	1936	Owned a Brasher Doubloon; at the time of his death, his collection was worth an estimated $5 million	
Edgar Adams	1868	1940	Editor of The Numismatist	
Victor Emmanuel III of Italy	1869	1947	Collection of over 100,000 coins is in the National Museum of Rome; also wrote a 20-volume Corpus Nummorum Italicorum, which catalogued each specimen in his collection.	
William Walter Coulthard Wilson	1869	1924	VP of American Numismatic Association, donated The Numismatist to A.N.A. and had one of the two finest collections of Canadian coins	
Farran Zerbe	1871	1949	President of the American Numismatic Association from 1908 to 1910.	
Enrico Caruso	1873	1921	Collection auctioned in 1923	
John Abner Snell	1880	1936	Collection of Chinese coins auctioned in 2011	
Eduard Kann	1880	1962	Austrian banker who went to work in China in 1901. Author of the first systematic catalog of Chinese coinage 'Illustrated catalog of Chinese coins (gold, silver, nickel and aluminium)' . Collection auctioned in 1970s and in 2000.	
Frank Stenton	1880	1967	Collection is at the University of Reading	
Herbert Ives	1882	1953	Served as president of the American Numismatic Society	
Arthur W. Hummel, Sr.	1884	1975	Passed collection of Chinese coins on to his son Arthur W. Hummel, Jr.	
Jerome Kern	1885	1945	Collection auctioned in 1950	
Francis Spellman	1889	1967		
Adolphe Menjou	1890	1963	Collection auctioned in 1957	
Lincoln Fitzgerald	1892	1981	Among the items in Fitzgerald Hoard were casino chips and 100,000 American silver dollars	
Josiah K. Lilly Jr.	1893	1966	Collection of 6125 gold coins donated to the Smithsonian Institution	
Louis E. Eliasberg	1896	1976	Put together the only complete collection of United States coins ever assembled	
LaVere Redfield	1897	1974	His collection (Redfield Hoard) consisted of over 407,000 silver dollar coins which weighed 12 tons	
Robert L. Hendershott	1898	2005		
J. Hewitt Judd	1899	1986	Collected United States pattern coins	
Joseph Douglas Ferguson	1901	1981	First Canadian to be President of American Numismatic Association, Honorary President of C.N.A. and had the finest collection of Canadian tokens, coins and currency, purchased by Bank of Canada Museum in 1963 and medals at the Glenbow Museum	
Richard S. Yeoman	1904	1988	Wrote A Guide Book of United States Coins	
Oscar H. Dodson	1905	1996	Kept a collection of ancient Greek coins with him while serving on board the USS Hornet in 1942	
Keith Bullen	1906	1976		
Buddy Ebsen	1908	2003	Owned a $4 Stella; co-founded the Beverly Hills Coin Club	
Philip Grierson	1910	2006	Bequeathed his collection of medieval coins to the Fitzwilliam Museum	
Arne E. Holm	1911	2009	Collection is in the NTNU Museum of Natural History and Archaeology	
Eric P. Newman	1911	2017	Collection sold over five auctions in 2013–2014 for almost $55 million	
John Jay Pittman	1913	1996	President of A.N.A. 1971-73 and C.N.A., massive collection of high-quality US and World gold and silver coins sold by David Akers in auctions from 1997 to 1999	
Farouk I of Egypt	1920	1965	Collection included a 1933 double eagle, and was sold by auction for a fraction of its real value in 1954 after Farouk's overthrow	
Arthur W. Hummel, Jr.	1920	2001	Inherited collection of Chinese coins from his father Arthur W. Hummel, Sr.	
Mark Hatfield	1922	2011		
Chris Schenkel	1923	2005	Collection auctioned in 1990 with 3404 lots	
Chester Krause	1923	2016	Started collecting when his aunts gave him some Whitman coin boards.	
Zollie Kelman	1926	2008	Created the Great Montana Collection	
Russell Rulau	1926	2012	Coined the term "exonumia"	
Nelson Bunker Hunt	1926	2014	Collected Greek and Roman coins; collection auctioned off in 1990 and 1991 as a result of his bankruptcy	
Jerome Remick	1928	2005	Edited The Guide Book and Catalogue of the British Commonwealth Coins; established the Royal Canadian Numismatic Association's Jerome H. Remick III Literary Award in 1995	
Harry W. Bass, Jr.	1927	1998	Collection resides in the American Numismatic Association Money Museum	
Kenneth Bressett	1928		Collects Chinese and Japanese coins as well as ancient Greek silver coins	
David Gee	1929	2013	Collected Australian coins	
William Herbert Hunt	1929	2024	Collected Byzantine coins; collection auctioned off in 1990 and 1991 as a result of his bankruptcy	
Johnny Cash	1932	2003	Collected Greek and Roman coins	
John V. M. Sturdy	1933	1996	1,751 twentieth-century world coins from his collection were donated to the Fitzwilliam Museum	
Jerry Buss	1933	2013	Owned a 1913 Liberty Head nickel and an 1804 dollar	
Q. David Bowers	1938		Began collecting at age 13 and became a coin dealer at age 14	
Walter J. Husak	1942	2022	Collection of 301 large cents auctioned in 2008 for $10.7 million	
Rick Springfield	1949		Assembled a world-class United States gold type set.	
Ted Binion	1943	1998	Binion had had a 12-foot-deep vault built on the desert floor to house the Binion Hoard on a piece of property he owned in Pahrump, 60 miles (97 km) west of Las Vegas. The concrete bunker contained six tons of silver bullion, Horseshoe casino chips, paper currency, and more than 100,000 rare coins	
Gregg Bingham	1951		Owned an extensive collection of commemorative half dollars and a complete collection of Morgan dollars	
Andre Dawson	1954		Collection auctioned in 1998 for over $6 million	
Jo Nambiar	1961		As an antique collector and numismatist, Nambiar has one of the largest collections of ancient coins and rare currencies in India. It is an asset that the Reserve Bank of India recognizes and borrows from for its annual “Coins and Currencies” exhibition	
Paul Hollis	1972		Began collecting at the age of six	

== See also ==
- List of numismatists
