= Husák =

Husák or Husak is a surname which may refer to:

- Emil J. Husak (born 1930), American politician
- Gustáv Husák (1913–1991), Slovak politician, president of Czechoslovakia and a long-term General Secretary of the Communist Party of Czechoslovakia
- Patrik Husák (born 1990), Czech ice hockey player
- Raisa Husak (1944-2017), Ukrainian folklorist
- Todd Husak (born 1978), American football quarterback
- Walter J. Husak (born 1942), American coin collector and business owner
