= Fitzgeralds Gaming =

American gaming and hotel company

Fitzgerald Gaming
- Formerly: Lincoln Management Corporation
- Type: Public
- Industry: Gaming, Hospitality, Tourism
- Founded: 1981; 45 years ago
- Defunct: November 2007
- Fate: Chapter 11 bankruptcy
- Headquarters: Reno, Nevada, U.S.
- Products: Casinos, Hotels, Entertainment, Resorts

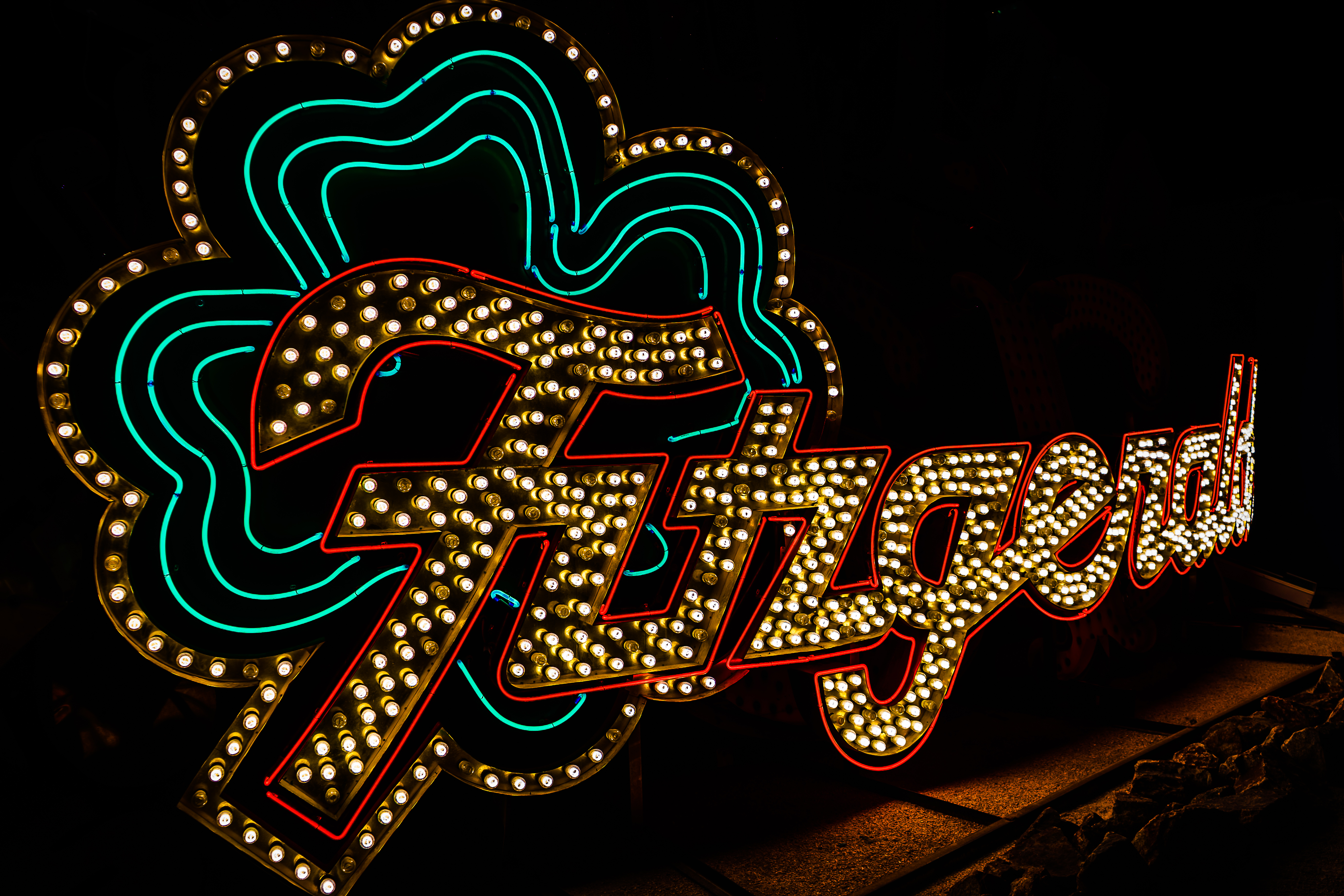
A Fitzgeralds sign at the Neon Museum in Las Vegas, Nevada, USA

Fitzgeralds Gaming was a gaming and hotel company based in Reno, Nevada, that operated four casinos under the Fitzgeralds brand. It filed for Chapter 11 bankruptcy in December 2000, and subsequently sold all its properties.

== History ==
=== Lincoln Management ===
Lincoln Management Inc. was founded in 1984 by Philip Griffith and several other former casino executives of the Summa Corporation, who had worked at Harolds Club in Reno and the Sands Casino in Las Vegas. It was formed to assume the management of the nearby Fitzgeralds Hotel-Casino under a contract with the casino's owner, Meta Fitzgerald. Fitzgerald had operated the property since the 1981 death of her husband, the casino's founder, Lincoln Fitzgerald. The new company's management agreement took effect in April 1985.

In December 1986, Lincoln Management exercised an option to buy Fitzgeralds from Meta Fitzgerald for $26 million. On the same day, the company also assumed management of the Nevada Club, a nearby casino also owned by Fitzgerald; the property was closed briefly before reopening under the company's management in February 1987.

Also in December 1986, the company expanded into Southern Nevada, taking over management of the Sundance casino in Downtown Las Vegas for its owner, Moe Dalitz. The following year, Lincoln's principals partnered with members of Oppenheimer & Co. to purchase the property from Dalitz. The Sundance was rebranded under the Fitzgeralds name in March 1988.

In 1988, Lincoln Management bought Harolds Club from the Summa Corporation, and also acquired the Nevada Club from Fitzgerald.

In April 1993, the company was selected by the Oneida Indian Nation to assist in developing the Turning Stone Casino and to manage the casino. Before opening, however, the tribe opted instead to self-manage the casino.

In May 1993, the company received preliminary approval for a casino to be built near Tunica, Mississippi. Fitzgeralds Tunica opened in June 1994, at a cost of $46 million. A hotel was added to the casino in 1996 at a cost of $34 million.

In 1993, the company made a bid for the last available gaming license in the Kansas City area, proposing a $145 million casino in Sugar Creek, Missouri. The license was awarded to Station Casinos instead, to build what is now the Ameristar Casino Kansas City. Station was later investigated for improper contact with the president of the gaming commission, and Fitzgeralds sued and received a $38 million settlement in 2004.

=== Fitzgeralds Gaming ===
In 1994, Lincoln Management was reorganized as Fitzgeralds Gaming Corp. in preparation for a potential initial public offering. The IPO was canceled, however, in 1995, because of weak stock market demand for mid-size casino companies.

In May 1995, the company opened Fitzgeralds Black Hawk in Black Hawk, Colorado. The company had assumed management of the casino and licensed the Fitzgeralds name to what had previously been the 101 Main Street Casino. Fitzgeralds Gaming bought a 22 percent interest in the casino in February 1996 for $2.5 million, and then bought the remaining 78 percent in August 1997 for $27 million.

Another casino under the company's management, the Cliff Castle Casino in Camp Verde, Arizona, owned by the Yavapai-Apache Nation, opened on the same day as Fitzgeralds Black Hawk. Fitzgeralds operated the casino until 1998, when the tribe bought out the management agreement for $8 million.

Meanwhile, Fitzgeralds disposed of two of its smaller properties. The company closed Harolds Club in March 1995 and sold it two months later for $8.9 million. The Nevada Club was closed in December 1997, and six months later was sold to the neighboring Harrah's Reno for $3.8 million.

In 1999, the company found itself in financial difficulty because of slower than expected growth and stiff competition. It defaulted on payments to bondholders in July 1999, and began negotiating a debt restructuring. A deal was ultimately reached for the company to sell three of its casinos (Las Vegas, Tunica, and Black Hawk) to Indiana-based Majestic Star Casino for $149 million, and for bondholders to forgive much of the company's remaining $205 million in public debt. The plan was filed in December 2000 as a prepackaged bankruptcy case. The sale of the three properties was completed in December 2001.

The agreement with bondholders also called for Fitzgeralds Reno to be sold. No buyer was readily found, because of concerns about competition from Northern California Indian casinos and disruption from a railroad construction project next to the property. In 2003, the casino was taken off the market, and ownership of Fitzgeralds Gaming was transferred to its creditors, a group of institutional lenders.

Fitzgeralds Reno was finally sold in November 2007 to L3 Development, developer of the neighboring Montage Reno condominiums, leaving Fitzgeralds Gaming with no remaining operations.

== List of properties ==
- Fitzgeralds Black Hawk — Black Hawk, Colorado (sold in 2001)
- Fitzgeralds Las Vegas — Las Vegas, Nevada (sold in 2001)
- Fitzgeralds Reno — Reno, Nevada (sold in 2007)
- Fitzgeralds Casino & Hotel Tunica — Tunica, Mississippi (sold in 2001)
- Harolds Club — Reno, Nevada (closed and sold in 1995)
- Nevada Club — Reno, Nevada (closed in 1998; sold in 1999)
