= Tahoe Biltmore =

Hotel and casino in Crystal Bay, Nevada

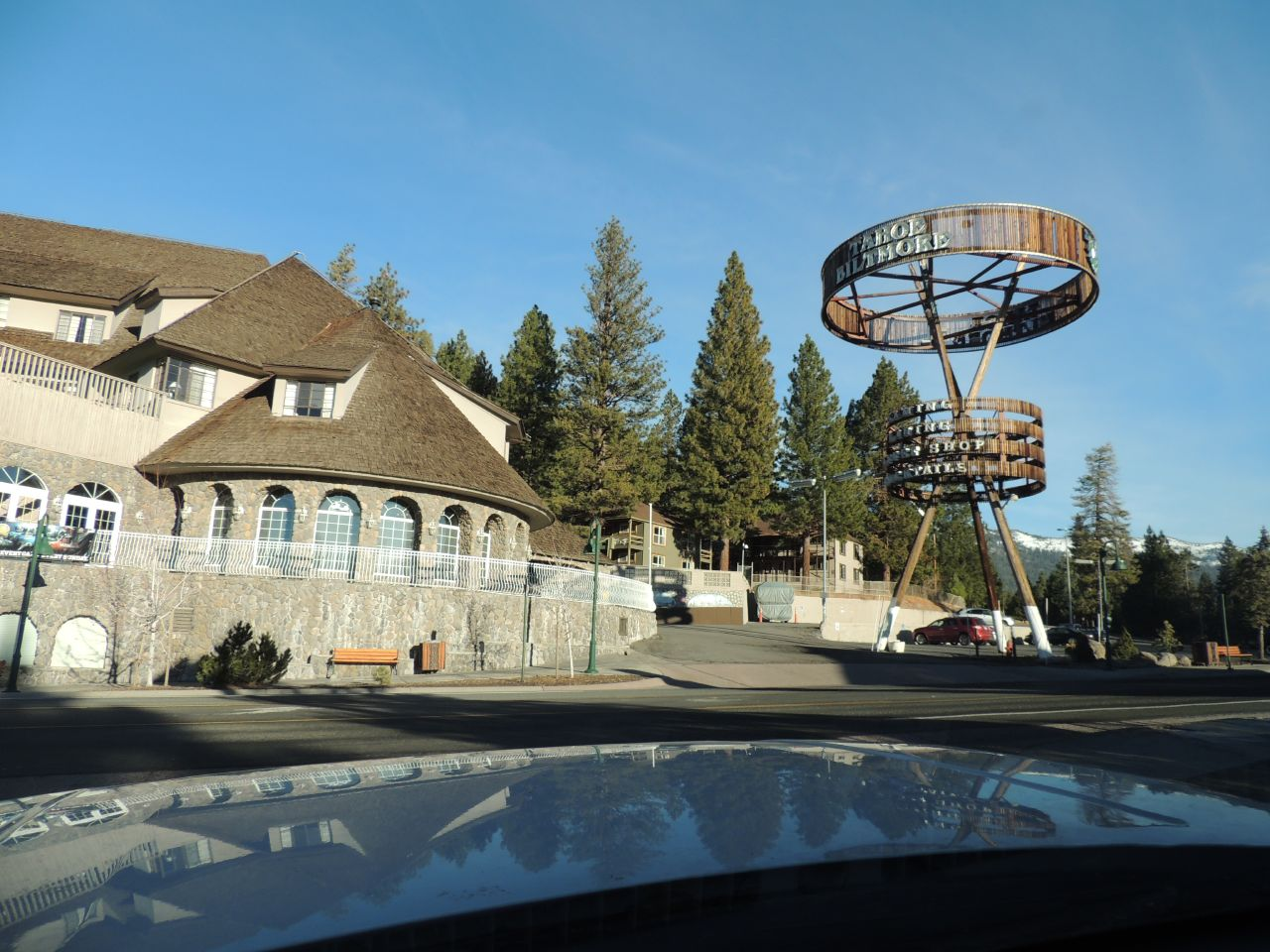
- From left to right: main building, cottages, and roadside sign (2012)
- Interactive map of Tahoe Biltmore
- Location: 5 State Route 28, Crystal Bay, Nevada, U.S.; 39.2284°N 120.0045°W
- Opened: June 30, 1948
- Closed: April 30, 2022
- No. of rooms: 113
- Gaming space: 10,398 sq ft (966.0 m^{2})
- Owner: EKN Development Group (since 2021)
- Previous names: Cal Neva Biltmore (1953–1956); Nevada Lodge (1958–1986)
- Renovated in: 1953, 1958, 1986–87, 1993, 1997

The Tahoe Biltmore is a closed hotel and casino in Crystal Bay, Nevada. It opened on June 30, 1948, after several years of delayed construction, a result of design changes and rising costs. Upon opening, the Tahoe Biltmore encountered further financial problems. It closed after a year, and would later change ownership and names several times.

In 1953, it reopened under new owners as the Cal Neva Biltmore. Three years later, the property was sold again and reverted to its original name. In 1957, it was sold to casino owner Lincoln Fitzgerald, who renamed it the Nevada Lodge a year later. Another ownership change took place in 1986, when the Tahoe Biltmore name was revived once again.

In its final years, the Tahoe Biltmore had a 10,398 sq ft (966.0 m^{2}) casino and 113 rooms, including cottages. EKN Development Group purchased the property in 2021, with plans for redevelopment. The Tahoe Biltmore closed on April 30, 2022, and demolition of its main building is expected around early 2025, following delays. EKN intends to replace the Tahoe Biltmore with a Waldorf Astoria hotel, expected to open in 2028. As of April 2026, the main structure remains standing and is extremely dilapidated.

== History ==
=== Early years ===
Construction of the Tahoe Biltmore was underway by the end of 1945, with an opening expected the following year. Despite its name, the property was not associated with the Bowman-Biltmore Hotels chain. The project's ownership group included Harry Brody and Harold Wyatt, both Reno casino owners, and Nathan Blumenfeld, a San Francisco theater owner.

The Tahoe Biltmore was designed by California architect Bernard G. Nobler. The property's opening was delayed, and construction was stopped at the end of 1946, leading to a lawsuit filed by contractors over unpaid work. It was alleged that the project's budget continually increased as a result of design changes, rising from an initial estimate of $250,000.

Completed at a cost of $1.5 million, the Tahoe Biltmore eventually opened on June 30, 1948. It consisted of a four-story structure, which included 38 rooms. Blumenfeld was originally licensed to operate the casino, along with Sam Lewis and Nola Hahn, both of Los Angeles. Sam Termini took over casino operations in 1949. It was later learned that gangster Charles Binaggio, the godfather to Termini, had planned to invest heavily in the Tahoe Biltmore and make it "the biggest gambling joint west of the Rockies," although this did not pan out.

After its opening, the property encountered additional financial problems, with its furnisher demanding either the return of leased items or $38,000 representing outstanding payments. The Tahoe Biltmore closed in September 1949, with the items returned and the property entering bankruptcy later that year. Remaining assets, including mattresses and liquor, were court-ordered to go on sale in 1950. The property's failure was blamed on its limited number of rooms and competition from the nearby Cal Neva.

The Tahoe Biltmore's primary creditors were the Reconstruction Finance Corporation (RFC) and Anglo California National Bank. In 1951, the RFC began advertising the hotel-casino for sale, although the agency rejected several early bids because they were deemed too low. A year later, the property was sold in a bidding war for $225,000. Hotel operator Joseph Greenbach prevailed against three other bidders, including Sanford Adler, operator of the Cal Neva. At the end of 1952, Adler took over the Tahoe Biltmore through a lease with Greenbach.

=== Name changes and renovations ===
Following renovations, Adler and other partners reopened the property in 1953, as the Cal Neva Biltmore. It now included the addition of six cottage buildings, half of them being one-story and the other half being two stories, adding a total of 44 new units.

Four young men, in the advertising industry, purchased the hotel-casino in 1956, and restored the Tahoe Biltmore name. A year later, the property went into bankruptcy again, and was sold to Lincoln Fitzgerald, a Reno casino owner. Fitzgerald remodeled and enlarged the hotel-casino, and reopened it on July 4, 1958, as the Nevada Lodge. It now featured 114 rooms. Fitzgerald also acquired an adjacent casino, Joby's Monte Carlo, which opened several years earlier. Located just west, the Monte Carlo structure was incorporated into the Nevada Lodge. The hotel-casino would become known for its roadside sign, consisting of a log tripod which supports wooden slats that include signage, advertising various amenities. Added in 1962, the sign became a familiar sight for motorists arriving from California.

A two-year expansion project was finished in 1963, adding more casino space and a theater lounge. Vive Les Girls, a Parisian production featuring showgirls, was produced by Frederic Apcar and ran during the 1960s. The property would also go on to offer entertainment from performers such as Phyllis Diller, Helen O'Connell, Dick Martin and Dan Rowan, Soupy Sales, Regis Philbin, and Rudy Vallée. The casino was purportedly haunted by the ghost of a showgirl named Mary, who died in a car accident during the 1960s.

Fitzgerald died in 1981, and his wife Meta took over the Nevada Lodge. In 1986, it was sold for $8 million to a group who owned the Crystal Bay Club casino across the street. The group also included part-owners of the Onslow hotel-casino in Reno. Under the new ownership, the Tahoe Biltmore name was revived once again. The property received minor renovations, including new paint and lighting. Further renovations were carried out in 1987, at a cost of $4 million. A new cafe was built in 1993, replacing the Monte Carlo structure. A $500,000 hotel renovation concluded in 1997.

=== Redevelopment ===
In 2007, the Tahoe Biltmore was sold to Boulder Bay LLC for $28 million. A year later, the company announced plans to demolish the Tahoe Biltmore and replace it with Boulder Bay, a new casino resort with 366 rooms and condominiums. The proposal received mixed reactions from local residents. Although the aging property was viewed by some as rundown, others were worried that its replacement was too large and would negatively lead to population growth, including an increase in traffic. The permitting process for the Boulder Bay resort was lengthy, eventually being approved by the Tahoe Regional Planning Agency in 2011. The project was ultimately canceled as a result of financing issues.

In 2021, the Tahoe Biltmore was sold to EKN Development Group for $56 million. Like the previous owner, EKN planned to redevelop the land. The Tahoe Biltmore closed on April 30, 2022. At the time, the property included 113 rooms and a 10,398 sq ft (966.0 m^{2}) casino with 100 slot machines. It was popular among locals, especially for its $1.99 breakfast.

Later in 2022, EKN partnered with Hilton Hotels to build a Waldorf Astoria hotel on the land, with the opening expected in 2027. To be known as Waldorf Astoria Lake Tahoe, the project would include 76 rooms, 61 residential units, and a casino. This project has also received criticism for its size and potential impact on traffic.

Work on the Waldorf Astoria project was set to begin in 2023. The start of construction was delayed by removal of asbestos in the Tahoe Biltmore's cottages, which were eventually demolished in 2023. The main hotel-casino building contained more asbestos than anticipated. It was left standing as the last of the Tahoe Biltmore structures to be demolished.

In 2024, EKN defaulted on an $82 million payment owed to an investor in the redevelopment project, pushing the start of construction to 2025 and the opening to 2028. Site preparations, including road and utility work, continued despite the default. The Tahoe Biltmore soon entered foreclosure, with an auction scheduled for October 2024. This was canceled after the default notice was rescinded, giving EKN time to restructure its debt and proceed with redevelopment. The main hotel-casino structure is expected to be demolished around early 2025.
