= Dubreuil =

Dubreuil is a French surname. It may refer to:

- Alphonse du Congé Dubreuil (1734–1801), French playwright and poet
- Geoffroy du Breuil of Vigeois, 12th-century French chronicler
- Jacques Lemaigre-Dubreuil (1894–1955), French businessman and activist
- Laure Hériard Dubreuil, French businessperson
- Laurent Dubreuil, Canadian speed skater
- Louis Étienne Arthur Dubreuil, vicomte de La Guéronnière (1816–1875), French politician and aristocrat
- Marie-France Dubreuil (born 1974), Canadian figure skater
- Toussaint Dubreuil (c. 1561–1602), French painter
- Victor Dubreuil (1846–after 1910), Franco-American painter of currency still lives.
