= Dibrell =

Dibrell is a surname, an Americanized form of French Dubreuil. Notable people with this surname include:

- George Gibbs Dibrell (1822–1888), American lawyer and legislator in Tennessee; general in the Confederate States Army
- Joseph Burton Dibrell Jr. (1855–1934), American lawyer and judge in Texas
- Tony Dibrell (born 1995), American professional baseball player

== See also ==
- Dib Williams (born Edwin Dibrell Williams; 1910–1992), American professional baseball player
- George D. Young III (born George Dibrell Young III in 1955), bishop of the Episcopal Diocese of East Tennessee
