= Zollie Kelman =

American businessman

- Zollie Kelman
- Born: c. 1926; Minnesota
- Died: June 23, 2008 (aged 85–86); Great Falls, Montana
- Occupation: Gaming business
- Known for: Coin collection

Zollie Kelman (c. 1926–June 23, 2008) was an American businessman who operated gaming machines in Great Falls, Montana. He founded the American Music Company in the 1940s. He was a coin collector and his coin collection became known as the Great Montana Collection.

== Background ==
Zollie Kelman was born c. 1926. His parents were Jewish Russian immigrants and Zollie was born and raised in Minnesota. Kelman attended school until the 10th grade when he left to begin work. He had one brother named Sidney who was born in Poland in 1922. Sidney began working with Zollie in 1953.

== Career ==
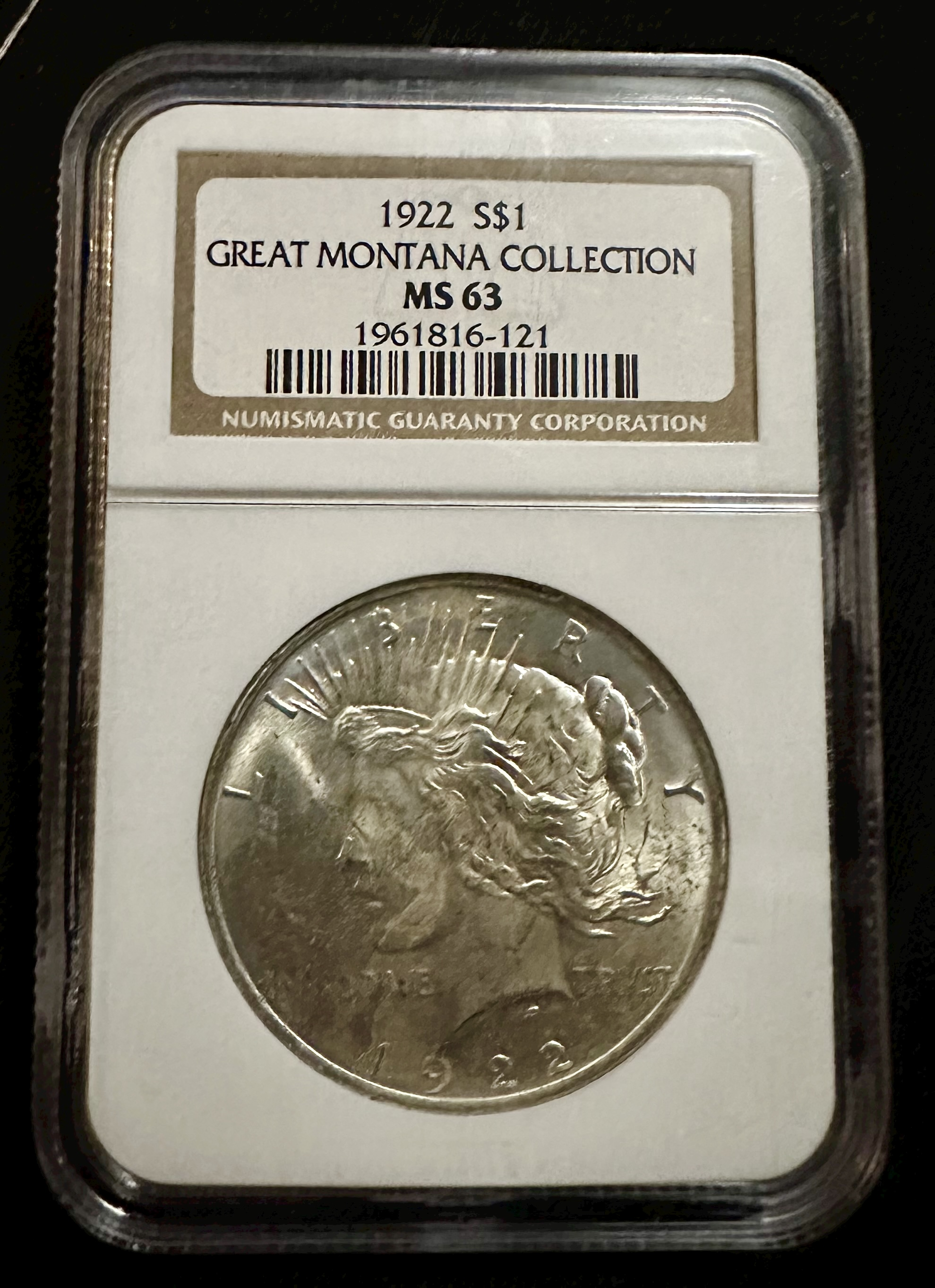
1922 Peace dollar from the Great Montana Collection graded and slabbed by NGC

Zollie Kelman started a family-owned business known as the Great Falls' American Music Company. The business was started in the 1940s and grew to have 700 games in 61 businesses. The company leased pinball machines, amusement and jukeboxes to taverns. In 1987 Montana state agents conducted raids on Great Falls area taverns where Kelman had placed his gaming machines. Kelman was fined US$50,000 (equivalent to $141,696 in 2025). Two of his other businesses were Zollie's Jewelry Exchange and World Wide Press.

Kelman was also a coin collector. He was able to empty out his gaming machines and he segregated and saved the silver coins. He involved his family in the sorting and they also became coin collectors. Zollie also collected paper money; in particular he liked to collect Black Eagle Silver Certificates. In total he collected about 6,000 of the Black Eagle dollars. In 2019, Zollie's son David opened a coin store in Great Falls.

On October 24, 1976, three men broke into the home of Kelman hoping to steal his coins. His coins were said to have a value of US$250,000 (equivalent to $1,414,474 in 2025). One of the burglars came to the door and told Kelman he had a special delivery. The three men wore masks and they broke into the home. Kelman and his family were held at gunpoint while the burglars searched for his silver coins. The burglars were not aware that a family member was in another room calling the police.

== Personal life ==
He died of natural causes on Monday June 23, 2008. He was married to Evelyn Kelman and they had 3 children; Abby, Natalee, and David.

== See also ==
- List of coin collectors
