= Pattern coin =

Sample coin to demonstrate the design of a coin

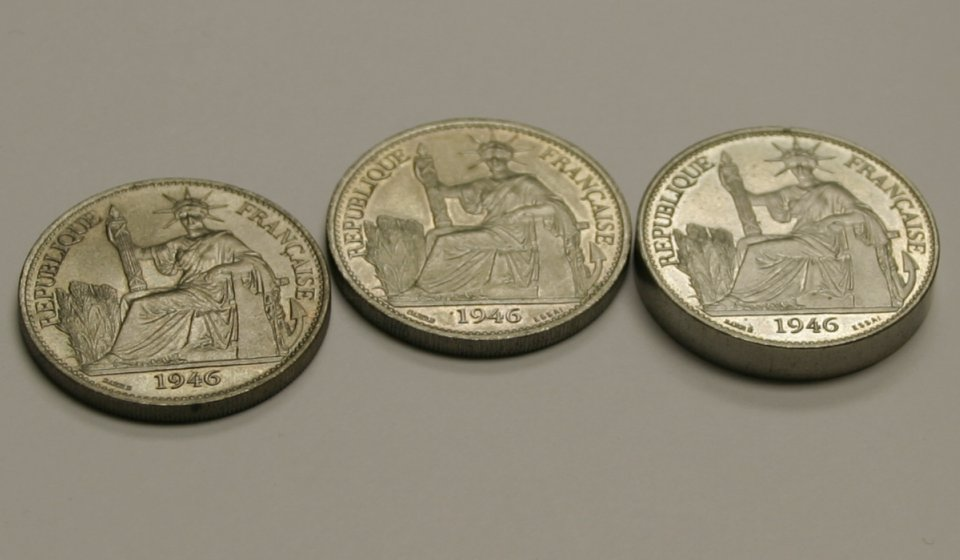
Regular coin (left), pattern coin (center) and piedfort (right)

A pattern coin is a coin which has not been approved for release but is produced to evaluate a proposed coin design. They are often off-metal strike (using metals of lower value to test out the dies), to proof standard or piedforts. Many coin collectors collect and study pattern coins because of their historical importance. Many of the world's most valuable coins are pattern coins; nearly 25 of the pieces listed in 100 Greatest US Coins are pattern coins.

== English patterns ==
The first English coin that can be identified with certainty is a groat, originally worth fourpence. This piece, an example of which was illustrated and sold in the Dodsley Cuff sale of the mid-19th century, had crowns in place of the usual three pellets in each quarter of the reverse.

Patterns are particularly identifiable and exist in larger numbers from the reign of Elizabeth I onwards. The experimental base metal issues of all coinage prior to the mid-18th century have been well preserved.

Boulton's mint in Soho produced large quantities of patterns, which were supplemented by Taylor some fifty or so years later from the same dies.

== United States patterns ==
=== Early United States patterns ===
1792 pattern coins
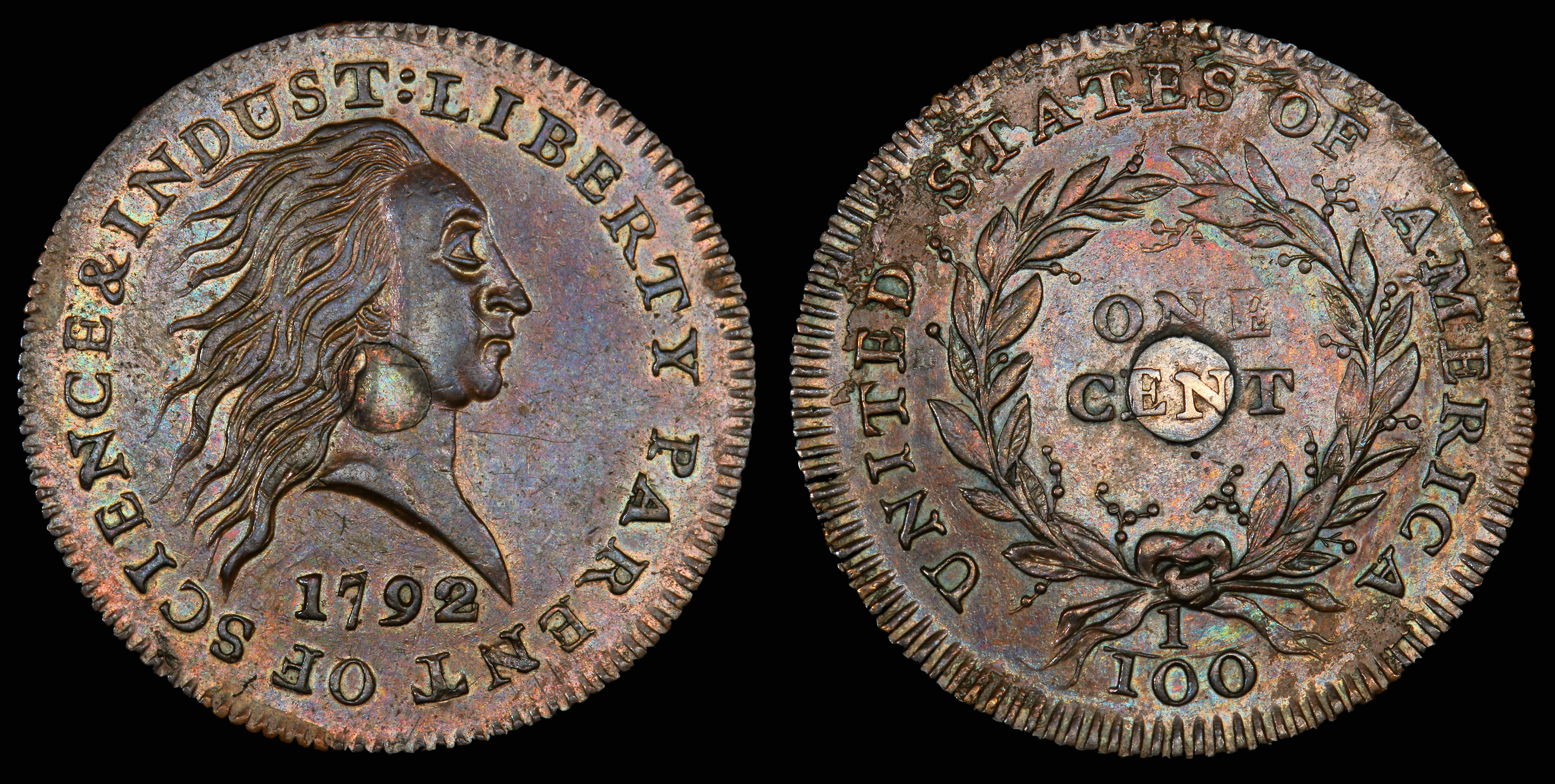
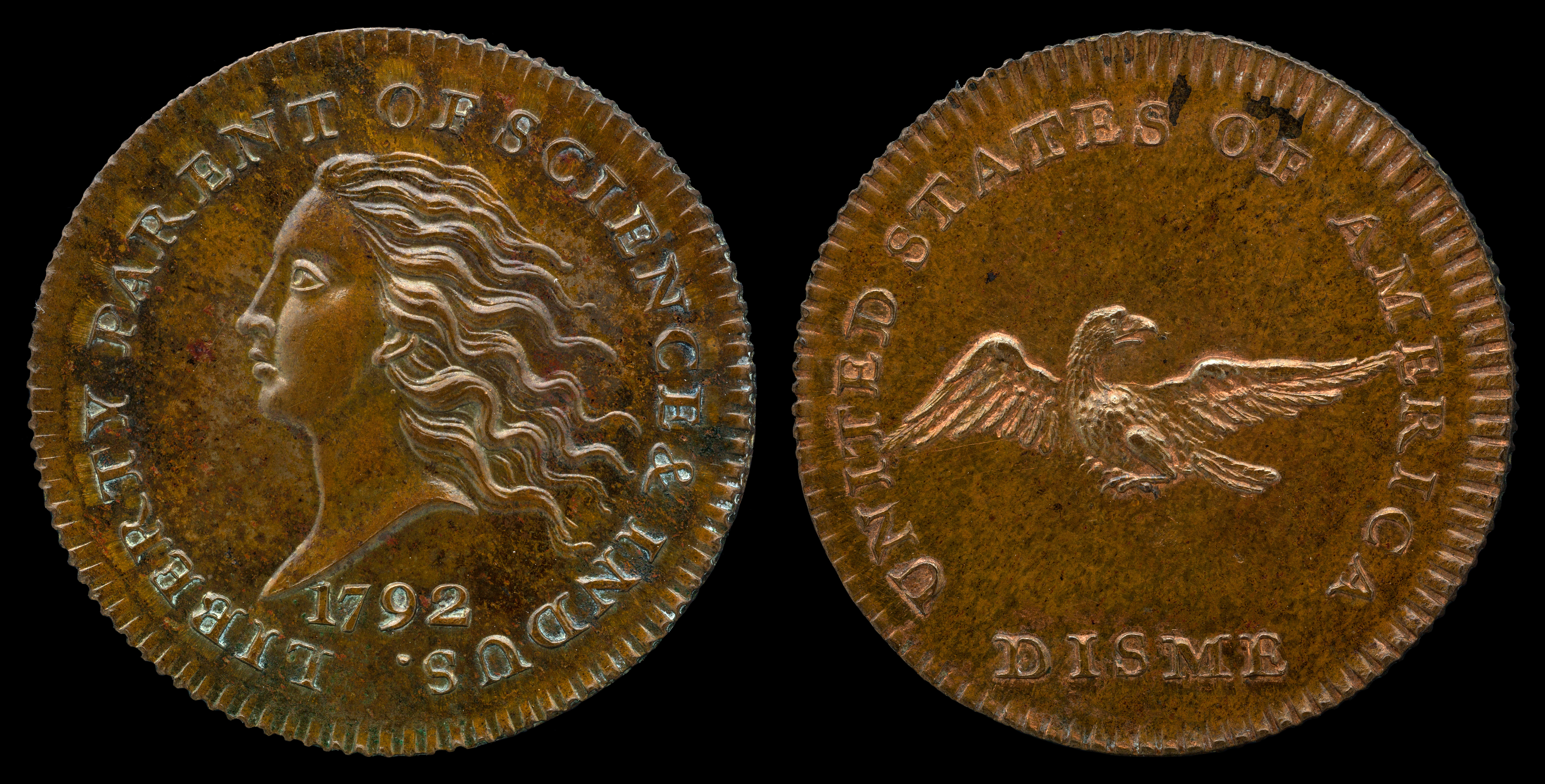
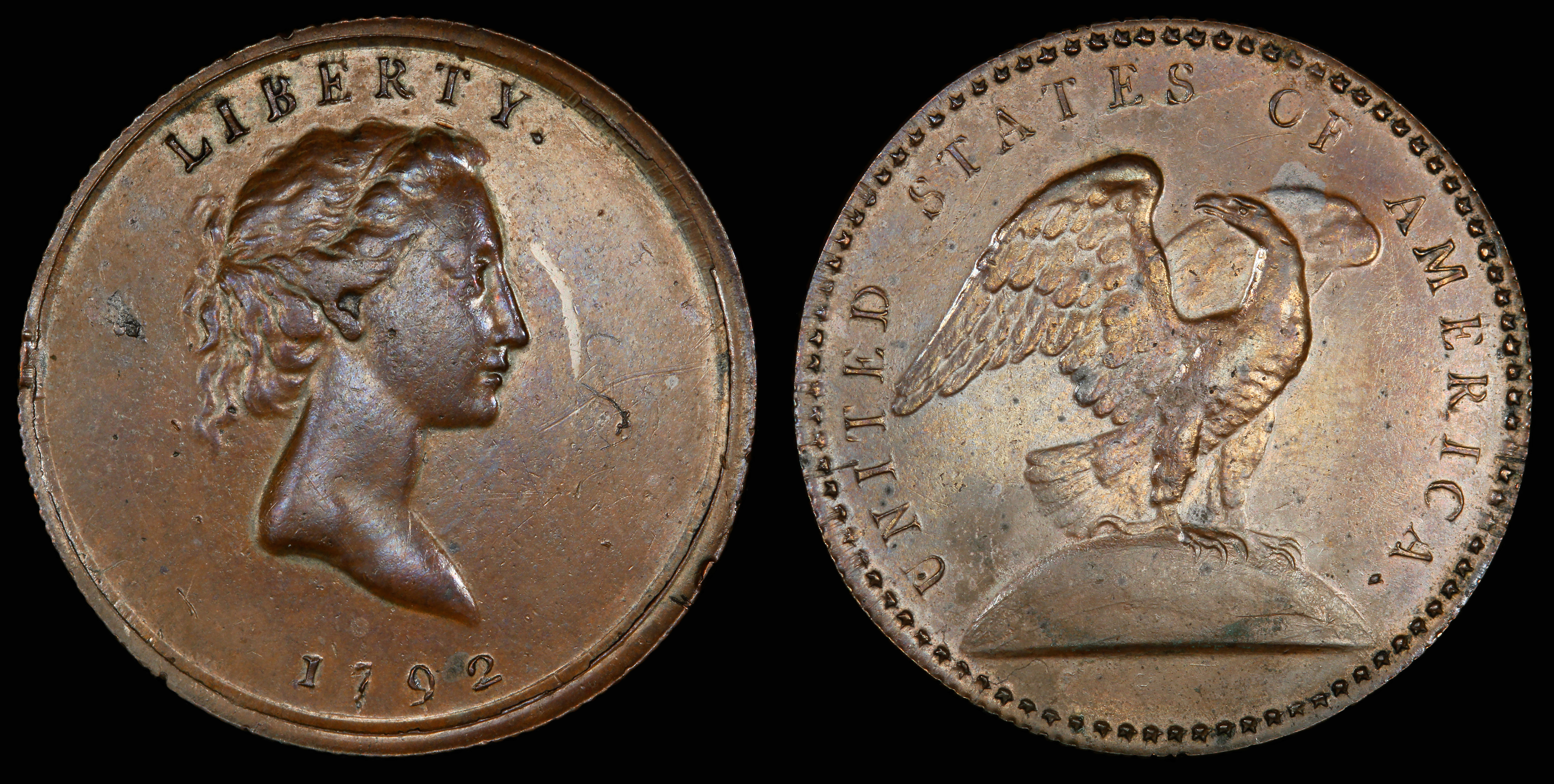
Silver center cent, dime, quarter

After the Declaration of Independence was signed on July 4, 1776, discussion arose over what sort of currency should be adopted in the United States. At the time, people in North America relied upon a mixture of foreign coins, none of which were struck to a consistent standard, making day-to-day financial transactions difficult. In 1783, Congress resolved to create a mint, tasking Superintendent of Finance Robert Morris with developing a plan for a system of coinage. The first coins struck by the United States – the Nova Constellatio patterns – were made to illustrate this plan.

In 1792 the United States Mint opened in Philadelphia. In that year several more patterns were created, including the half dime, then known as a "half disme". It is believed that c. 1,500 pieces were struck as patterns, and that these patterns themselves entered circulation during the next decade.

Over the next 40 years, more patterns were created but there is little information currently known about these pieces. Technically, these coins were not patterns but rather off-metal strikes, with the coins struck in a different metal than those destined for general use in circulation. An example is an 1807 Half Eagle, or five dollar gold piece struck in copper.

=== Mid-19th century United States patterns ===
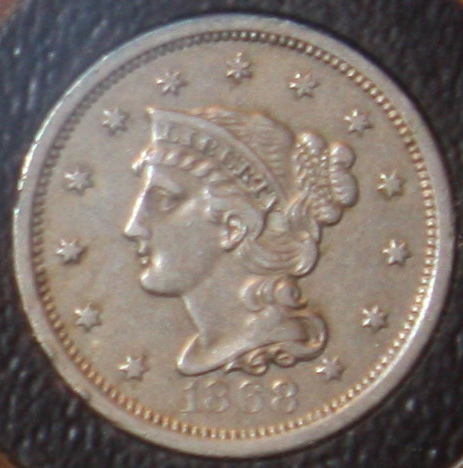
1868 pattern for a large cent-sized, copper-nickel, ten-cent piece. From the Harry W. Bass, Jr. Collection.

Starting in 1836, more patterns were created by the United States Mint in Philadelphia. These consisted of several types of patterns:

- Real pattern coins for proposed coinage
- Off-metal strikes
- Transitional pieces
- Fantasy pieces

One example of a pattern coin for proposed coinage is the half-union, a gold pattern coin with a face value of 50 U.S. dollars that was minted in 1877 and weighed 2.5 ounces (71 g). The U.S. Mint deemed the idea of a 2.5-ounce gold coin infeasible, and only two were ever minted.

Transitional pieces are patterns dated before coins with the new design officially went into circulation. These were often produced during the final stage of the pattern process, used to present the newly adopted design to the public. One famous example is the 1856 Flying Eagle cent, although that coin has been commonly and incorrectly believed to be regular issue due to its high mintage for collectors.

Fantasy pieces include many struck in the 1860s and 1870s as patterns and sold to numismatists for the sole purpose of raising cash for the mint. This practice ended in the 1880s, when the U.S. Mint enforced regulations to prevent the sale of pattern coins.

=== Modern United States patterns ===
The U.S. Mint experiments with new coinage occasionally, such as when silver was removed from coin designs. The Mint began using dies with Martha Washington for trial strikings, since they would not be confused with real circulating money since they do not resemble money. Thus, no restrictions exist on the sale of Martha Washington pieces. Mint-produced modern patterns are very rare, with only a few pieces existing in private collections. The United States mint has placed restrictions on the sale of modern patterns that do resemble coins, such as the 1974 aluminum cent. One of the most expansive collections of American pattern coins is the Harry W. Bass, Jr. collection housed at the American Numismatic Association Money Museum in Colorado Springs, Colorado.

== Other countries ==
Pattern coins of France and of French-speaking countries such as Monaco are described by the French term essai. The essai coins of New Hebrides are of interest to collectors of British Commonwealth coinage, as New Hebrides gained independence in 1980 as the Republic of Vanuatu.

The word essai is found inscribed on the pattern coins of Namibia along with the German word Probe.

== See also ==
- Specimen banknote
- Specimen stamp
