= Fitzgerald Hoard =

Hoard found in Reno Nevada

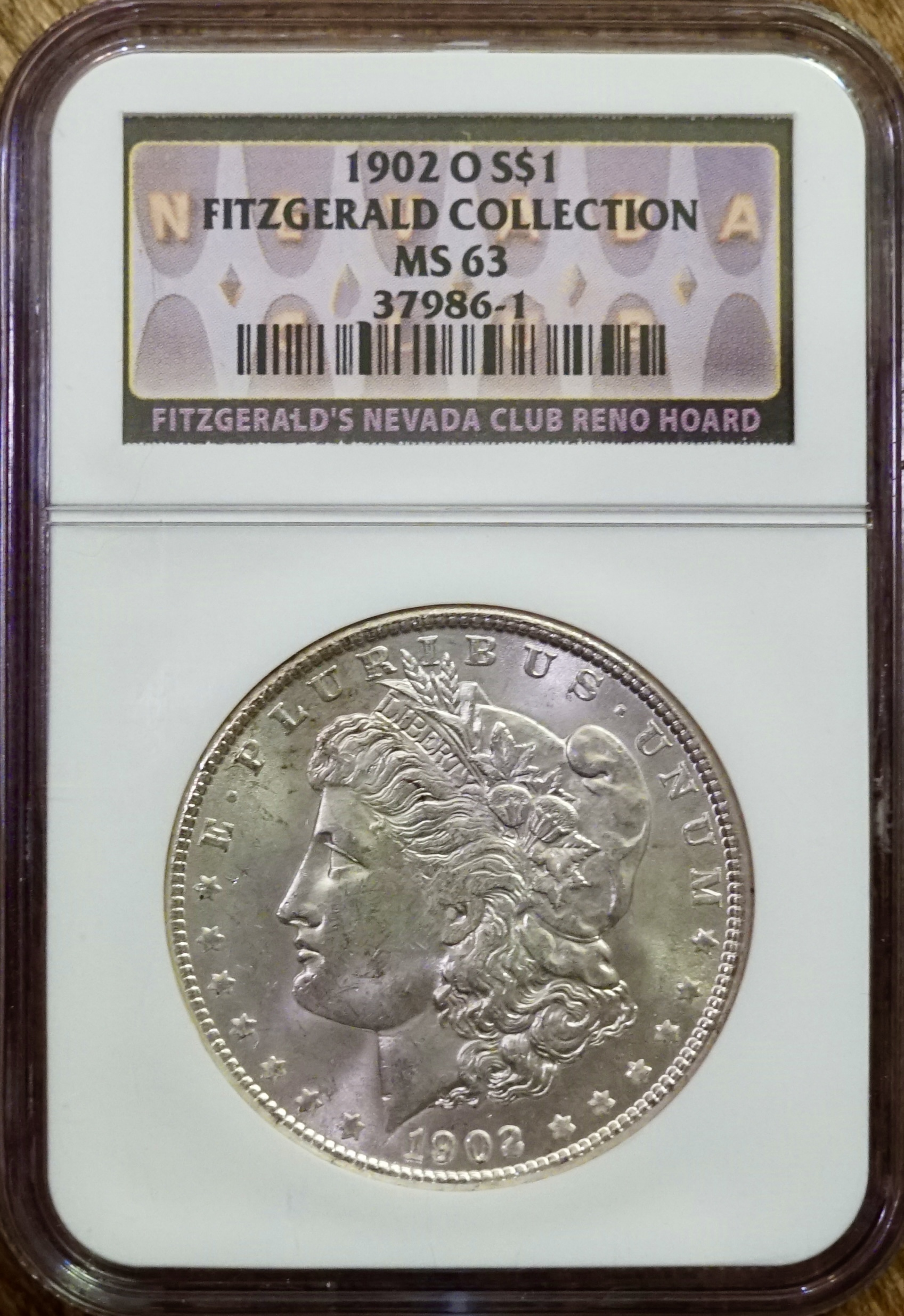
1902-O NGC graded Morgan silver dollar from the Fitzgerald Collection

The Fitzgerald Hoard was a collection of casino chips, silver coins and collectables which had been stored in a warehouse in Reno, Nevada. The entire hoard was purchased by notable California coin dealer Ron Gillio. Named for casino owner Lincoln Fitzgerald, it included over 100,000 American silver dollars and masses of gambling paraphernalia.

== Background ==
Lincoln Fitzgerald ran three casinos in Nevada: the Nevada Club, which was in downtown Reno, Fitzgeralds Casino & Hotel, Reno, and the Nevada Lodge in Lake Tahoe. After a 1949 assassination attempt, Fitzgerald began sleeping at one of his casinos. He stayed on the second floor of The Nevada Club in a steel-walled apartment; he was referred to as reclusive by the Reno Gazette-Journal. He began saving collectables and silver dollars, from his casinos and his restaurant, in a Reno, Nevada, warehouse.

== History ==
Californian coin dealer Ron Gillio in 2003 purchased the hoard—22 years after its namesake's death—from a warehouse outside of Reno. Amongst the items in the warehouse were roulette wheels, sealed treasury bags of silver dollars, casino chips, and other casino related merchandise. There were various branded tchotchke and souvenirs such as commemorative casino spoons and coasters, key chains, and matchbooks. Gillio called his collection the Fitzgerald Hoard.

The hoard included more than 100,000 American silver dollars which were in safes or piled in bags in a corner. Gillio purchased everything and claimed that it took 60 days to clear out the warehouse. He did not disclose the price that he paid for the collection but the casino chips and silver dollars alone had a face value of US$500,000. In June of 2004, Gillio held an auction in San Francisco to sell some of the items from the hoard. The Numismatic Guaranty Corporation (NGC) graded and slabbed the 100,000 Morgan and Peace silver dollars in the hoard.
