= Piedfort =

Coin

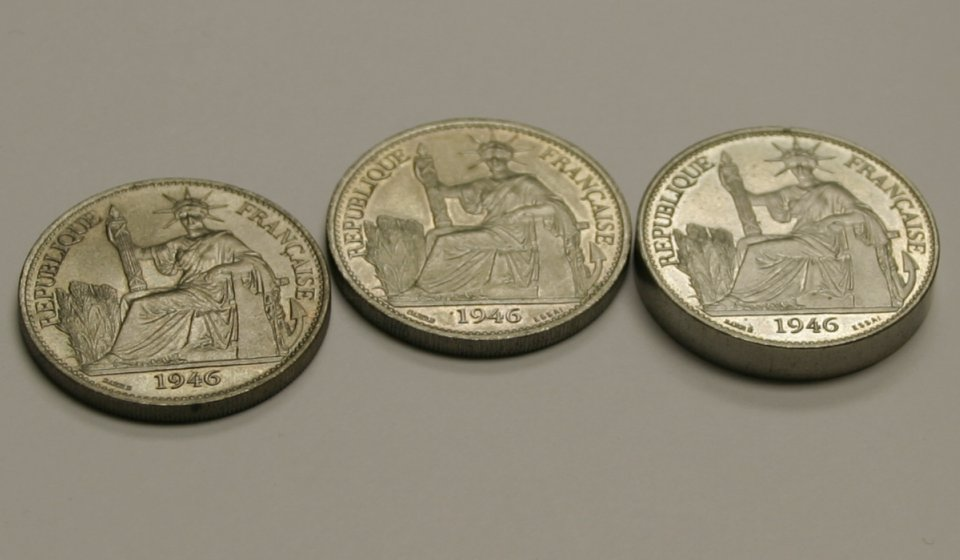
Piedfort on the right

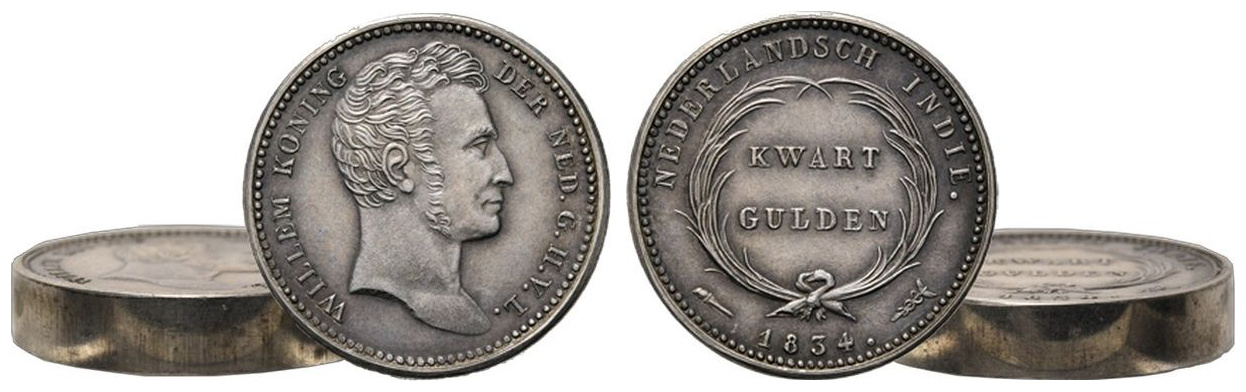
Piedfort of the 1834 quarter gulden of the Dutch East Indies, struck in silver on a thick flan. The tilted views at either side show the edge.

A piedfort (UK: /piˈeɪfɔːrt, ˈpiːɛdˌfɔːrt/, US: /piˌeɪˈfɔːr, piˈeɪfɔːr/; French: pied-fort or piéfort [pjefɔʁ]) is an unusually thick coin, often exactly twice the normal weight and thickness of other coins of the same diameter and pattern. Piedforts are not normally circulated, and are only struck for presentation purposes by mint officials (such as patterns), or for collectors, dignitaries and other VIPs. Piedfort is less commonly spelled "piefort".

== History ==
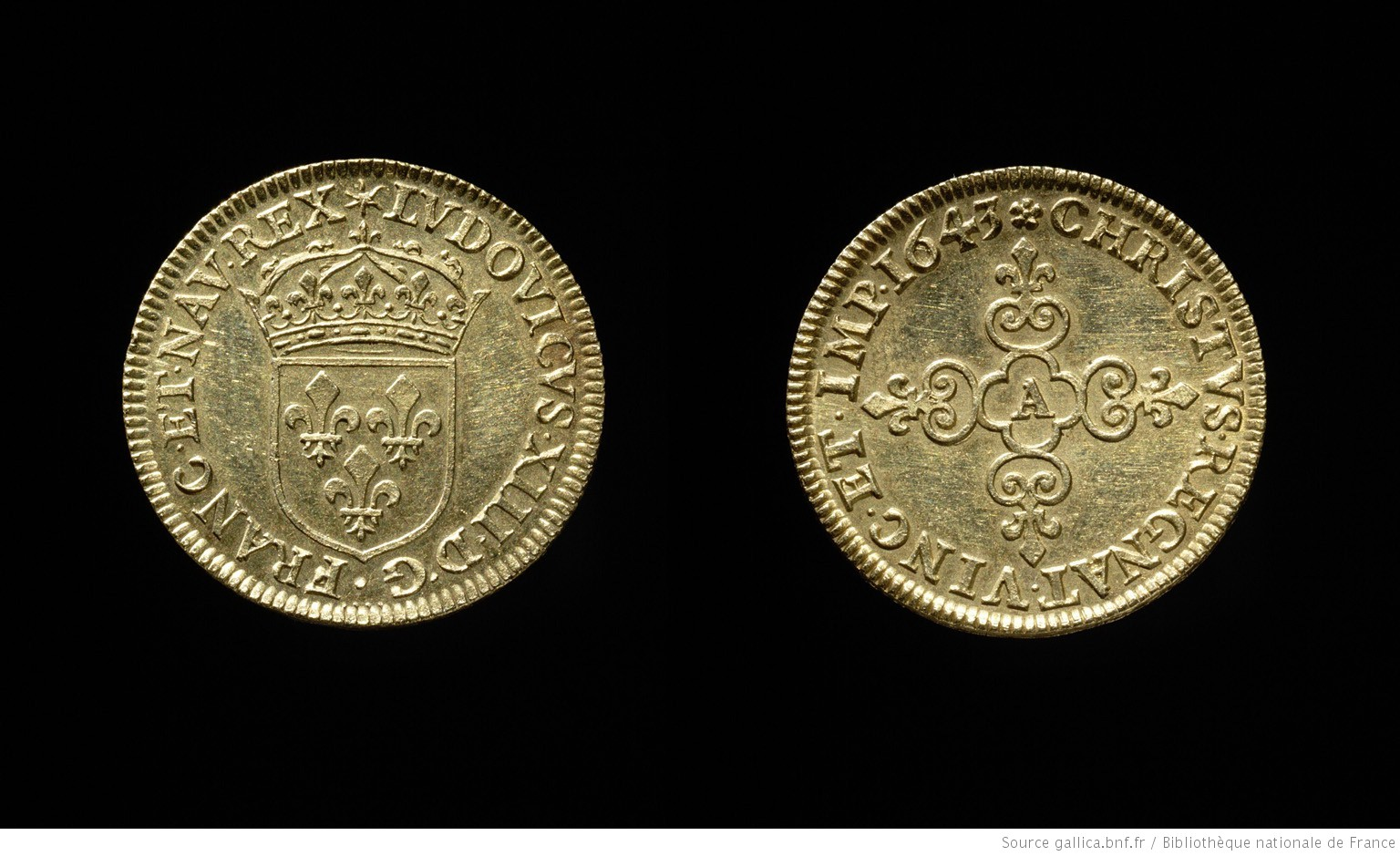
Piedfort of gold écu, Louis XIII, France, 1643

Piedfort coins were first recorded in France and Great Britain during the Middle Ages, with the first French piedforts appearing in the 12th century. The reason the coins were minted in piedfort form was probably to prevent them from being lost among normal circulating coins. Theories for the original purpose of the earliest piedfort coins are:

1. As patterns for administrative approval.
2. As patterns to show engravers in different mints what an approved design should look like.
3. As reckoning counters or jetons for mint officials, akin to a simple milestone or the beads on a more complex abacus.

Later, the higher rarity of piedfort versions of a nation's coinage led to them being used as prestigious diplomatic gifts to kings, nobility, dignitaries and other VIPs. Note that coin collecting has traditionally been called "the hobby of kings". The demand for piedforts from politically influential coin collectors resulted in such routine production that a droit de pied fort, or "right of piedfort", was instituted as a formal code of rules defining who was entitled to a piedfort version of a new coin design. Edicts of such rules date back to at least 1355 in France.

The first British piedforts were silver pennies minted during the reign of Edward I (1272 to 1307). Britain stopped routinely minting piedforts in 1588, but France continued to mint them for at least another 150 years before also ceasing production. The routine production of piedforts began again in France in 1890, and Britain began to produce piedforts available to the public for the first time in 1982. Since then, Britain's Royal Mint has become well-known for creating many commemorative piedfort coins. China produced piedforts for collectors in 1988.

== Etymology ==
Piedfort is a compound of the French words "pied" (foot), and "fort" (strong, great, heavy). It literally means "heavy foot", but the idiomatic meaning is "heavy weight". 18th century encyclopedic French dictionaries record it in the form of two separate words, as "pied fort" (1774):

PIED FORT, terms of currency, this word is said of a coin of gold, silver, or other metal, that is thicker than ordinary currency...

The modern form of "piedfort" appears in English by 1802 in a Sotheby's auction catalog, by which time the term was already in wide use.

== Misspelling ==
Impropriety of the piefort misspelling is attested to 1917, when the error had become common enough to warrant a mention in an early numismatic jargon dictionary:

Piefort, or more properly, Piedfort, means literally any coin struck on an unusually thick planchet as a trial piece or essay.

The piefort misspelling appears in English as early as 1893, where the author and citing authors give false etymologies of the word relating to the weight (not thickness) of a coin, the depiction of human legs on a coin, and a corruption of the name of the Belgian city of Liège ("Luik" in Dutch) as "Leg".

The influential Krause and Mishler Standard Catalog of World Coins has used both piedfort and piefort interchangeably for at least the prior three decades, as of 2012.

The piefort misspelling has crept back into the French language as piéfort.

== See also ==
- Glossary of numismatics
- Pattern coin
