= Great Montana Collection =

American coin collection

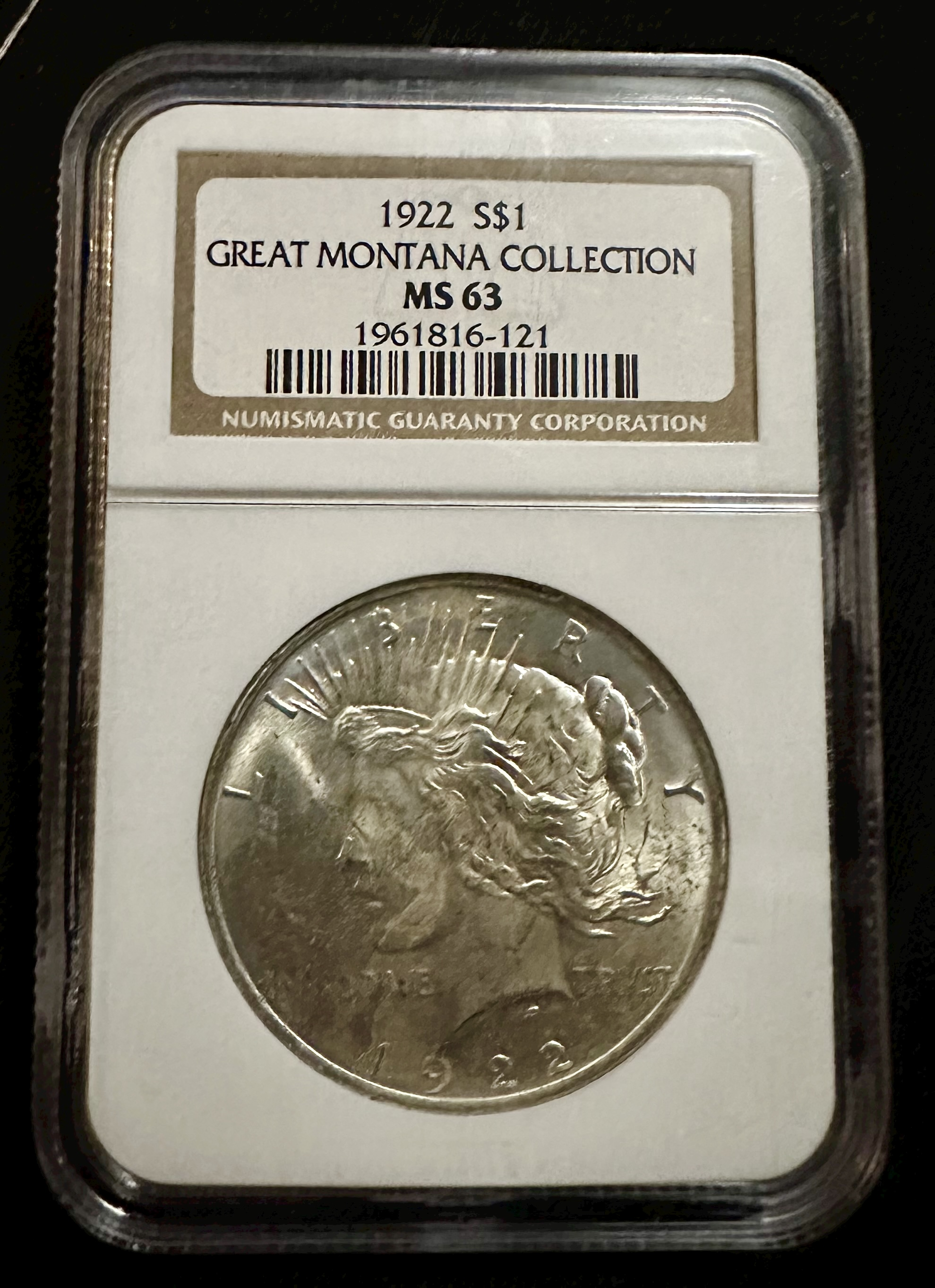
1922 Peace dollar from the Great Montana Collection graded and slabbed by NGC

The Great Montana Collection is a collection of coins which was amassed by American businessman Zollie Kelman in Great Falls, Montana. Kelman owned a business that leased games to taverns. He was able to collect many coins by sorting the coins and saving the ones with high silver content. In his collection he had amassed 60,000 silver dollars and 6,000 Black Eagle dollar bills.

== History ==
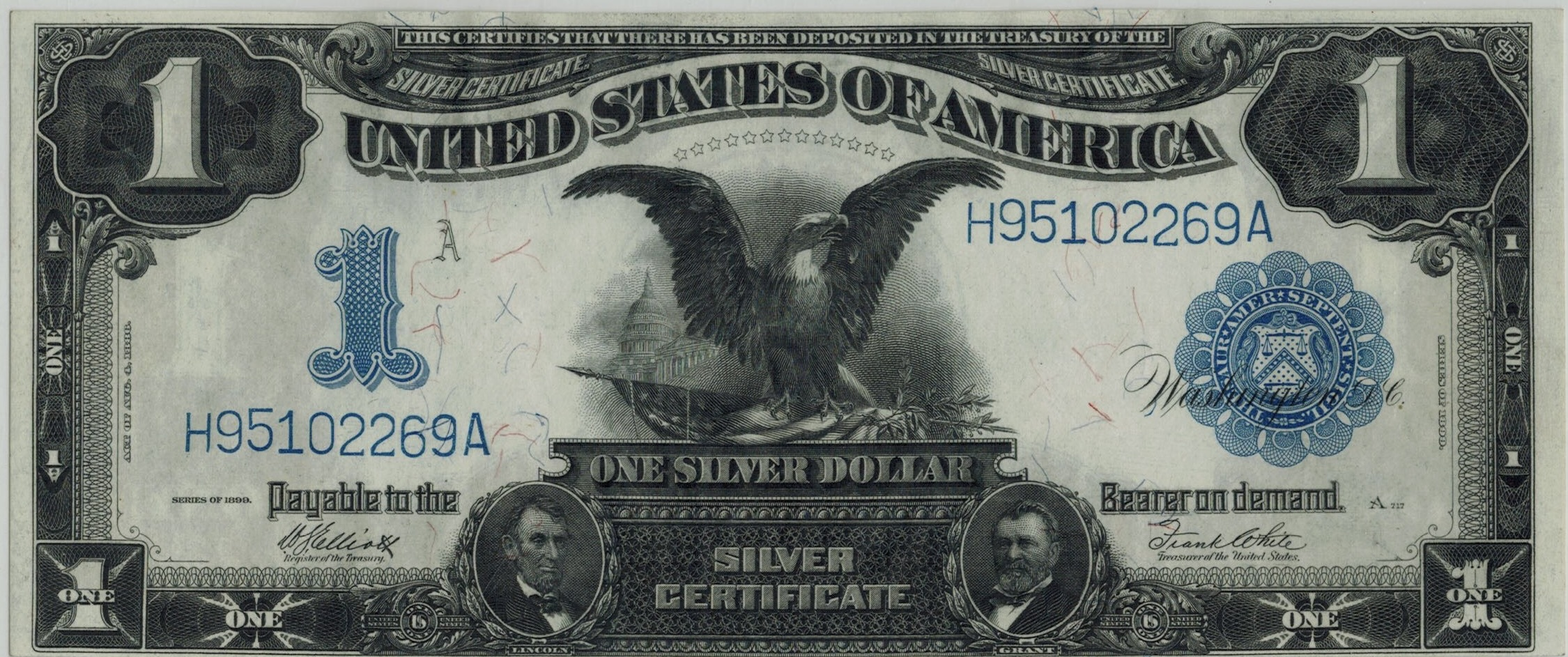
1899 Black Eagle Silver Certificate

Zollie Kelman was a business man who lived in Great Falls, Montana. He was known to keep roughly 60,000 silver dollars in his home. He was able to empty out his gaming machines and he segregated and saved the silver coins. He involved his family in the sorting and they also became coin collectors. Zollie also collected paper money; in particular he liked to collect Black Eagle Silver Certificates. In total he collected about 6,000 of the Black Eagle dollars. In 2019, Zollie's son David opened a coin store in Great Falls.

== Burglary attempt ==
On October 24, 1976, three men broke into the home of Kelner hoping to steal his coins. His coins were said to have a value of US$250,000 (equivalent to $1,381,433 in 2024). One of the burglars came to the door and told Kelman he had a special delivery. The three men wore masks and they broke into the home. Kelner and his family were held at gunpoint while the burglars searched for his silver coins. The burglars were not aware that a family member was in another room calling the police.

The police surrounded Kelner's home and captured the burglars. One of the burglars was shot in the leg by a policeman. The burglar had tried to escape out of a window at the Kelman home. Police thought that a disbarred attorney named Lavon Bretz had arranged for the burglary. Three men were arrested along with Bretz. Bretz later accused Kelner, the police and others of conspiring to implicate him in the crime; he filed a US$3.4 million dollar lawsuit.
