= Black Eagle Silver Certificate =

United States one-dollar silver certificate

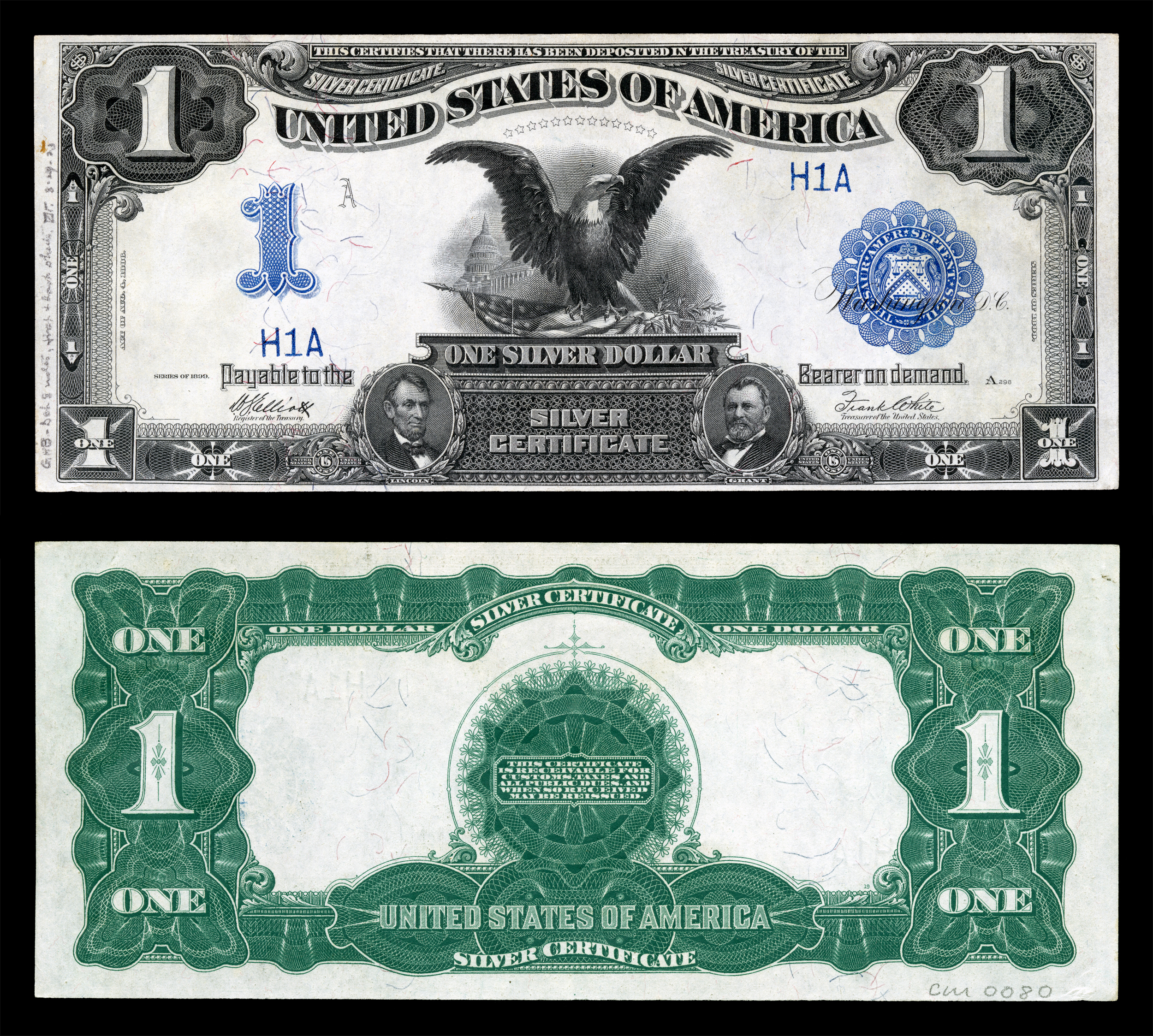
1899 Black Eagle (obverse and reverse)

The Black Eagle is a type of one-dollar silver certificate produced in 1899 in the United States. The note measured 7.38 in (187 mm) by 3.18 in (81 mm); it was of the large-size variety of bank-notes issued by the United States. The note featured a Bald eagle with its wings spread. The note was also referred to as "Eagle of the Capitol", because the United States Capitol is visible behind the eagle. The note was issued from 1899 to 1923 and the Bureau of Engraving and Printing (BEP) printed 3,604,239,600 Black Eagles. Because of the large size, it is colloquially referred to as a "horseblanket".

== Background ==
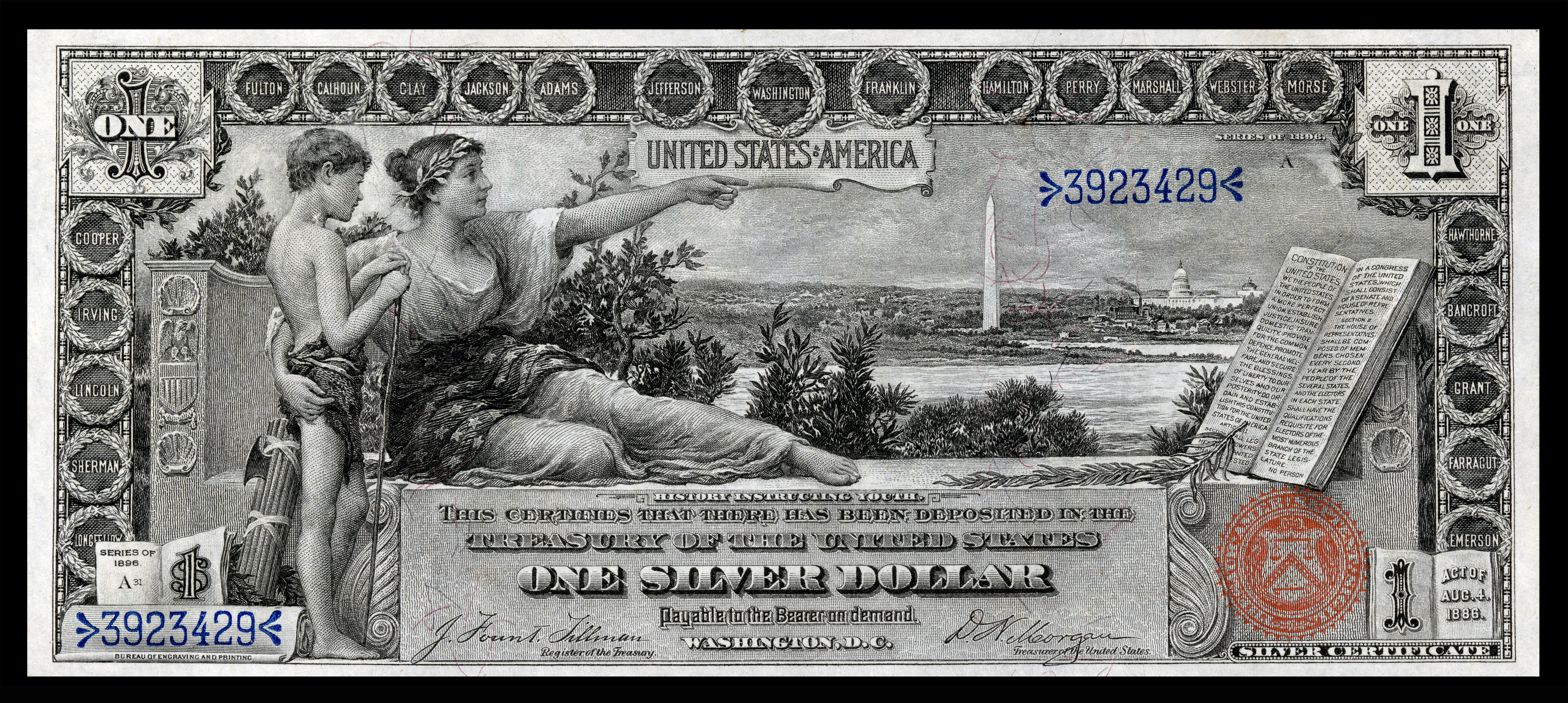
1896 US one-dollar bill History Instructing Youth

The 1899 series replaced the 1896 Educational Series notes. The Black Eagle replaced the one-dollar note in the 1896 series which was called "History Instructing Youth". The 1899 $1 Black Eagle was issued from 1899 until the 1920s. One reason for the redesign was to make counterfeiting more difficult. The 1899 series was the last series printed in large size, 7.38 in (187 mm) by 3.18 in (81 mm). Because of the large size, people referred to the currency as "horseblankets". The replacement for the Black Eagle was 6.14 in (156 mm) by 2.61 in (66 mm). The head engraver at the Bureau of Engraving and Printing (BEP) during the Black Eagle's design was G.F.C. Smillie.

== Description ==
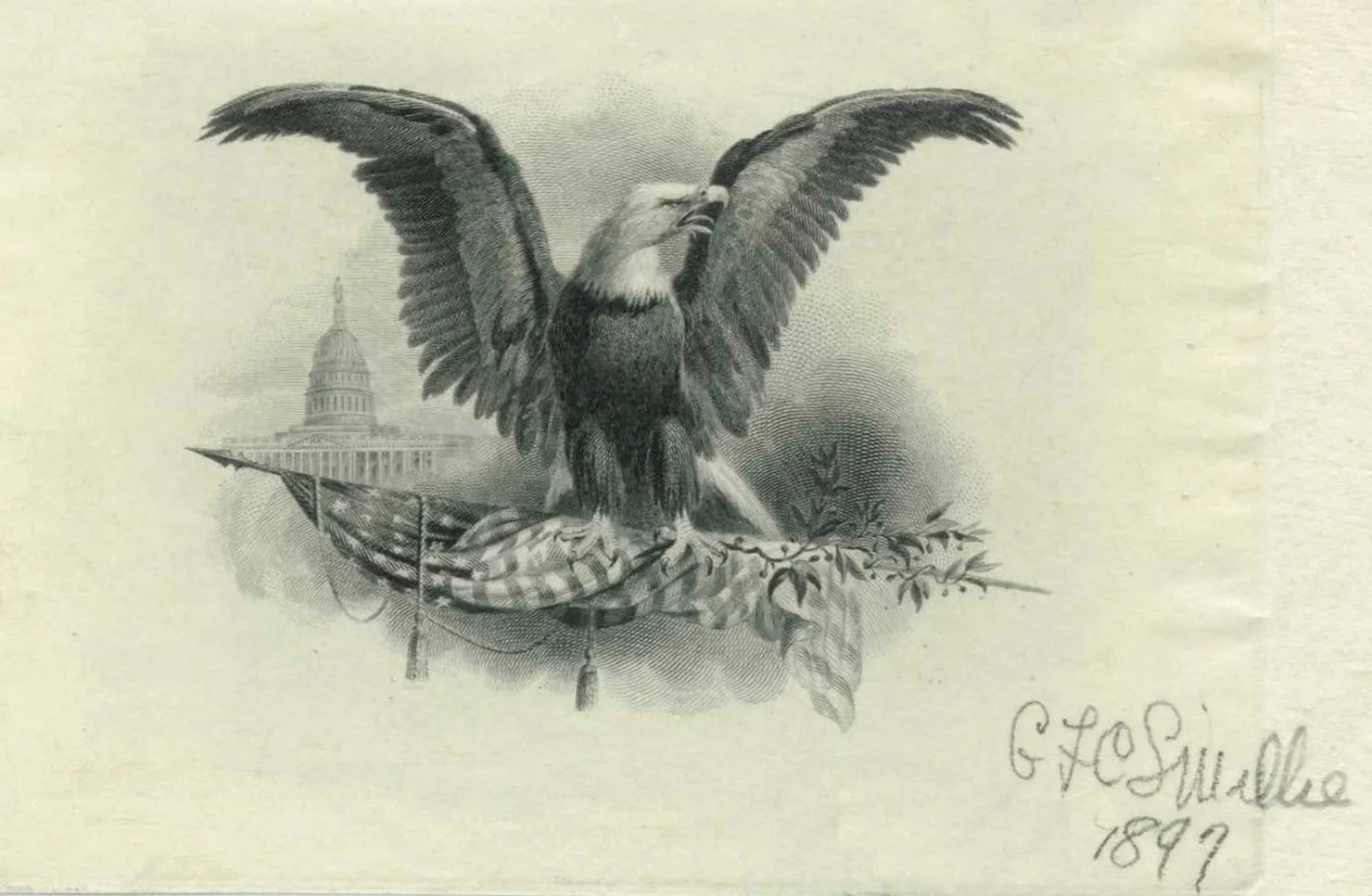
Bald eagle engraving signed by the engraver G.F.C. Smillie (1897)

The front of the note features a bald eagle standing on the Stars and Stripes. The eagle is pictured with wings spread, perched on an American flag as if guarding it. Behind the eagle is an image of the United States Capitol and so the note was also referred to as "Eagle of the Capitol". The notes featured portraits of both Ulysses S. Grant and Abraham Lincoln, former United States presidents, at the bottom of the obverse. All Black Eagle certificates have a small blue seal on the obverse to the right of the eagle. Smillie engraved the portraits of Lincoln and Grant which are found on the obverse of the 1899 series Black Eagle Silver Certificate. Smillie also created the engraving of the Bald eagle which appears in the center of the note.

A large number "1" appears on the obverse to the left of the eagle. The left serial numbers appear below the number one (1). After 1906 the Black Eagle note featured a large number one that was farther to the left on the obverse; it was thought that this improved the appearance of the note. The reverse of the note has been described as "plain" although there are ornamental designs. Also found on the reverse are the words, "This Certificate Is Receivable For Customs, Taxes and All Public Dues, And When So Received May Be Reissued".

== History ==
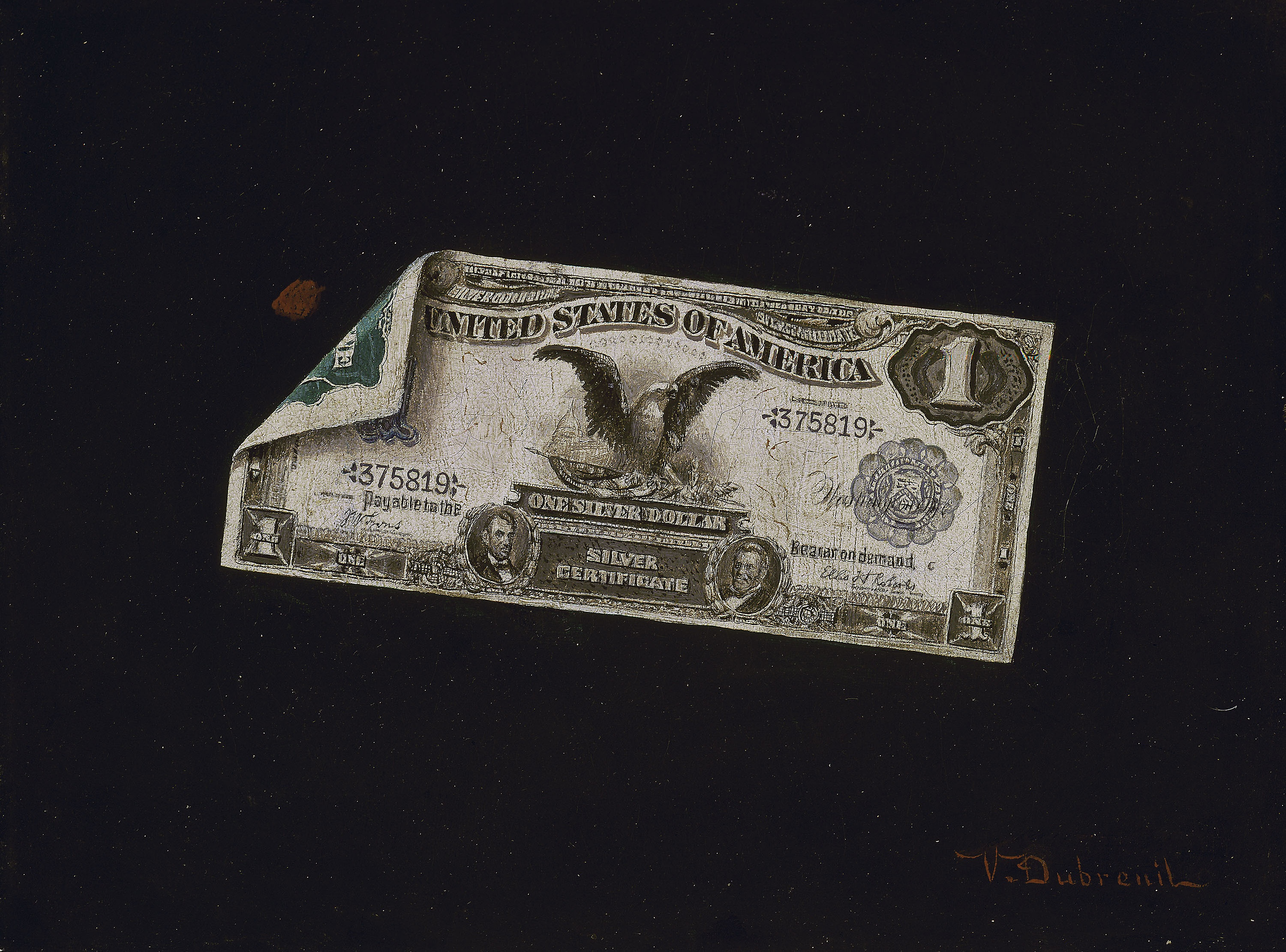
Victor Dubreuil painting - One Dollar Silver Certificate c. 1900

The one-dollar silver certificate was issued by the United States in 1899. The first Black Eagle notes began arriving at banks in January 1899. When the BEP identified mistakes in the printing of the 1899 Black Eagle, they printed replacement notes that had a star preceding the serial number on the obverse. There are 13 varieties of the 1899 Black Eagle; the value of the note to modern-day currency collectors is dependent on both their condition and whose signature appears on the note.

Between 1899 and 1923 a total of 3,604,239,600 Black Eagles were printed and most were heavily circulated. Uncirculated examples exist because many people also kept them as souvenirs. The Black Eagle note was replaced in 1923. Some currency and coin collectors such as Zollie Kelman liked to collect Black Eagle dollar bills. In total, he collected about 6,000 of the dollars.

One Black Eagle note was in the pocket of August (Augustus) H. Weikman aboard the RMS Titanic when it sank in 1912. After Weikman was rescued from the Atlantic Ocean, he inscribed the note on the reverse, "This note was in my pocket when picked up out of the sea by 'S.S. Carpathia' from the wreck of 'S.S. Titanic' April 15th 1912/A.H. Weikman/Palmyra, N.J."
