= Louis Étienne Arthur Dubreuil, vicomte de La Guéronnière =

French diplomat (1816–1875)

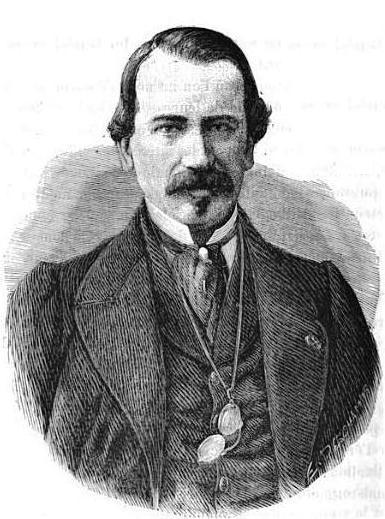
Arthur de La Guéronnière.

Louis Étienne Arthur du Breuil, vicomte de La Guéronnière (1816 – 23 December 1875) was a French politician and aristocrat, the member of a notable Poitou family.

== Biography ==
Although from early on connected with Legitimism, he became closely associated with the Republican Alphonse de Lamartine, to whose paper, Le Bien Public, he was a principal contributor. After Le Bien Public came to an end, he wrote for La Presse, and in 1850 edited Le Pays.

A character sketch of Louis-Napoléon Bonaparte in this journal caused differences with Lamartine, and La Guéronnière became more and more closely identified with the policy of the prince-president. Under the Second Empire, he was a member of the Conseil d'État (1853), senator (1861), ambassador to Belgium (1868), and to the Ottoman Empire (1870), and Grand Officer of the Légion d'honneur (1866). He died in Paris.

Besides his Études et portraits politiques contemporains (1856) his most important works are those on the foreign policy of the Empire: La France, Rome et Italie (1851), Le Pape et le Congrès (1859), L'Abandon de Rome (1862), De la politique intérieure et extérieure de la France (1862).

His elder brother, Alfred du Breuil Helion, comte de La Guéronnière (1810–1884), who remained faithful to the Legitimist party, was also a well-known writer and journalist. He was consistent in his opposition to the July Monarchy and the Empire, but in a series of books on the Franco-Prussian War of 1870–1871 showed a more favorable attitude to the Third French Republic.
