= Raisa Husak =

Ukrainian folklorist (1944–2017)

Raisa Dmytrivna Husak (12 December 1944 — 14 August 2017) was a Ukrainian folklorist, ethnoorganologist, and public activist. Honored Artist of Ukraine (1998). Member of the International Committee of Museums and Collections of Musical Instruments (1994).

== Biography ==
Husak graduated from Kyiv Conservatory in 1969. From 1966, she was a teacher at the Kyiv Secondary School No. 1. From 1971 to 1973, Husak was an artist of the Orchestra of Ukrainian Folk Instruments of the Musical and Choral Society of Ukraine. Since 1973, she has taught at the Kyiv National University of Culture and Arts.

Husak created the student professional folklore ensemble Wedding Music. The basis of its repertoire is more than 250 transcriptions of traditional instruments of music recorded during folklore expeditions in Transcarpathia, Prykarpattia, Bukovina, Hutsul region, Podolia, Left-bank Dnipro region, etc.

The unique collection of musical instruments she collected is known in many countries and is used in the creative activities of student groups.

== Works ==
- Wedding instrumental chapels of Podilsk Transnistria: sources of tradition formation // Collection. of Sciences, Proceedings of the Department of Folklore and Ethnography, Kyiv. state Institute of Culture. — K., 1995;
- Ceramic whistler in Ukraine // Problems of ethnomusicology: Science. coll. NMAU — K., 1998. — Vol. 1;
- "Stettle" musical culture in the south of Ukraine // Jewish history and culture in the countries of Central and Eastern Europe. — K., 1999;
- The Vessel Flute in Ukraine // Regional Traditions in Instrument Making. — Leipzig; Halle (Saale), 1999
- Klezmer traditions in the modern musical culture of Podillia // Jewish history and culture in Ukraine. — K., 2005;
- On preserved traditions of Jewish musical culture in Podillia // Materials IX international. Jewish readings. — Zaporizhzhia, 2005;
