= Whitney Peak Hotel =

Hotel in Reno, Nevada

Coordinates: 39.527959°N 119.813897°W

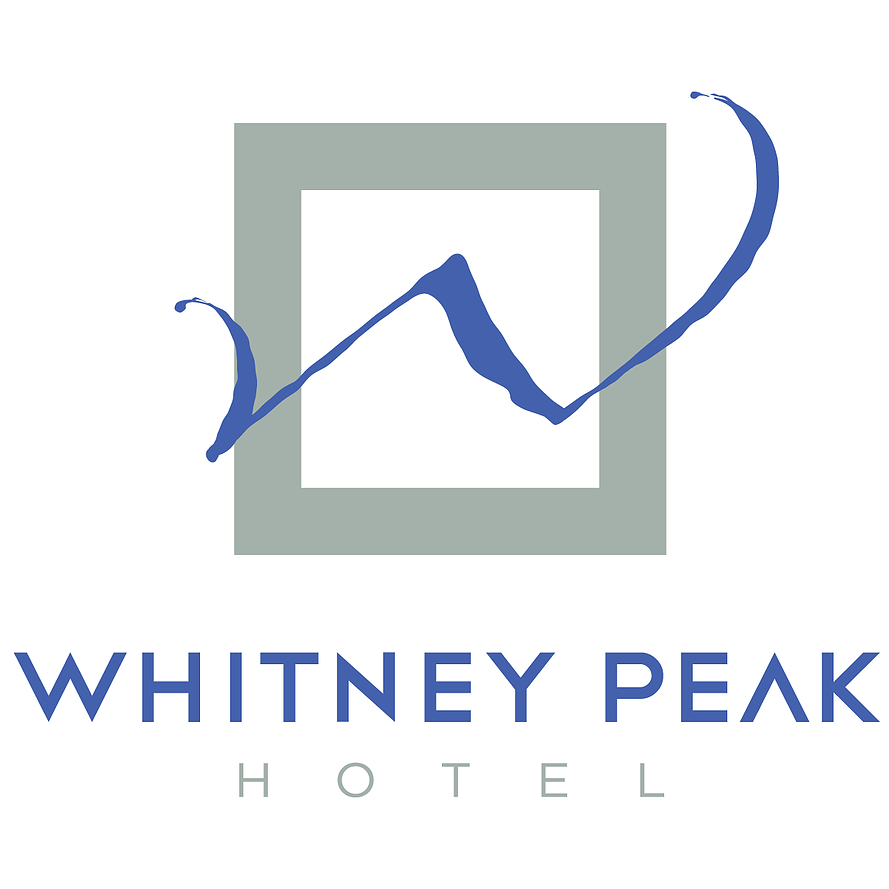

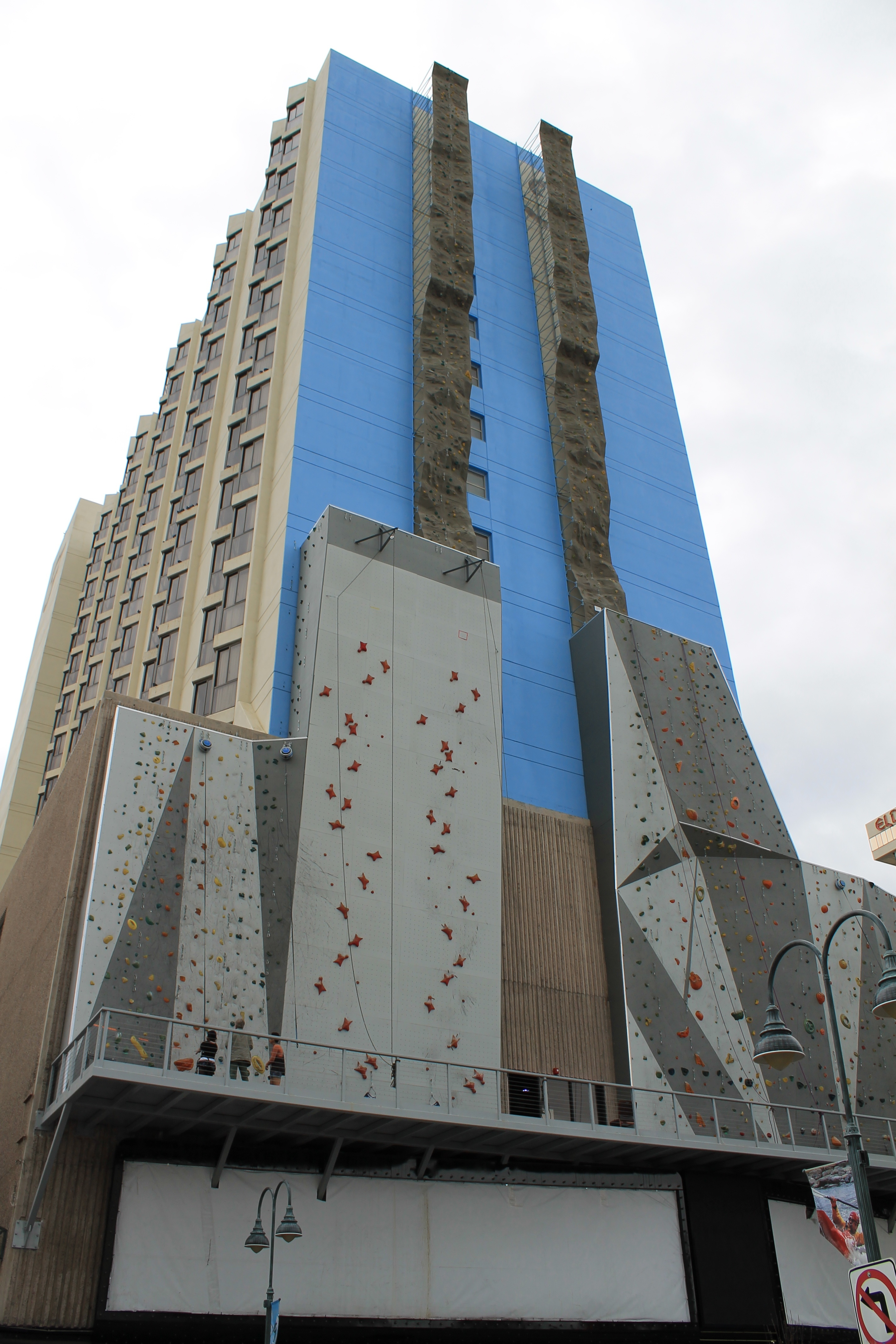
- Whitney Peak Hotel
- Interactive map of the Whitney Peak Hotel area
- Former names: Fitzgeralds Reno (1976–2008); CommRow (2011–2013)
- Hotel chain: Tapestry Collection by Hilton

General information
- Location: 255 North Virginia Street, Reno, Nevada, United States
- Groundbreaking: 1974
- Construction started: 1974
- Completed: 1976
- Opened: May 17, 1976; 50 years ago
- Renovated: 2011, 2013
- Cost: $1.5 million
- Renovation cost: $1.5 million
- Owner: DRW Holdings LLC

Height
- Height: 50 ft (15 m)

Technical details
- Floor count: 16
- Floor area: 420 m^{2} (4,500 sq ft)
- Lifts/elevators: 4

Design and construction
- Architecture firm: Worth Group

Other information
- Number of rooms: 310
- Number of suites: 310
- Number of restaurants: 1

Website
- whitneypeakhotel.com

Whitney Peak Hotel (formerly Fitzgeralds Reno and CommRow) is a hotel and former casino located in Downtown Reno, Nevada. It is owned and operated by DRW Holdings LLC, and is affiliated with the Tapestry Collection by Hilton.

== History ==
=== Fitzgeralds Reno (1976–2008) ===
Lincoln Fitzgerald, owner of the Nevada Club casino, began construction on a new 16-story, 347-room hotel and casino in 1974. Fitzgeralds Reno opened on May 17, 1976, at a total cost of $16 million.

After Fitzgerald's death in 1981, his widow, Meta, sold the property in 1986 to the Lincoln Management Company for $26.25 million.

Fitzgerald's Reno was the last of 4 properties owned by Fitzgeralds Gaming to be sold after the company filed for Chapter 11 bankruptcy protection in 2000. Prior to this, sister properties were located in Las Vegas, Tunica, Mississippi and Black Hawk, Colorado.

In 2005, Monarch Casino & Resort, Inc., owner of Atlantis Reno, attempted to acquire Fitzgeralds Reno. In April 2007, L3 Development, a development firm based out of Chicago, Illinois, announced its intention to purchase the property and convert it into a boutique hotel.

On November 1, 2007, ownership of Fitzgeralds Reno officially transferred to a joint partnership between L3 Development and RAC II LLC, marking the first time in decades that the property was under private ownership.

=== The Rainbow Bridge ===
The frequent nature of rail traffic along the first transcontinental railroad would often make access to the Fitzgeralds from the north inconvenient. As a result, sometime in the 1990s, Fitzgeralds undertook the construction of a footbridge across the tracks to the north, accessible from a structure modeled as a castle tower erected at the southwest corner of Virginia Street and Third Street (directly across the street from the entrance to the Eldorado). Guests would enter the base of the tower, ascend a set of escalators (they only went up; those wishing to exit the property via the bridge would have to wait for an elevator), and upon crossing the bridge, end up in the Lucky Forest. Due to the construction of the ReTRAC train trench, the bridge was determined to be in conflict with necessary structural elements of both the trench itself, as well as the resulting Virginia Street overpass. This, along with the trench rendering the bridge both redundant and unnecessary, ultimately led to its demolition in 2007.

=== CommRow (2011–2013) ===
On October 1, 2008, Fitzgeralds Reno announced its imminent closure in November 2008. 470 employees were laid off and the new ownership evaluated options for the property. The lower floors re-opened as CommRow on October 1, 2011 with the world's tallest climbing wall constructed on the exterior, CommRow was designated to have a hotel component but this never materialized and the business model as a whole, struggled and closed down on January 1, 2013.

=== Whitney Peak Hotel (2014–present) ===
Whitney Peak Hotel was announced as CommRow's replacement and the Chicago-based ownership decided it was going to gut the aging structure and rebuild from scratch, and the new property opened on Memorial Day weekend 2014. The completely renovated property shows no trace of the prior CommRow or Fitzgeralds Reno. The 164' exterior climbing wall, indoor climbing boulders, and the Blarney Stone monument are the only remnants from the past business model.

In 2023, the hotel joined the Tapestry Collection by Hilton, an upscale "soft brand" of hotels that use Hilton's reservation and loyalty network.
