= Andrew Gifford =

English Baptist minister and numismatist

Andrew Gifford (1700–1784) was an English Baptist minister and numismatist.

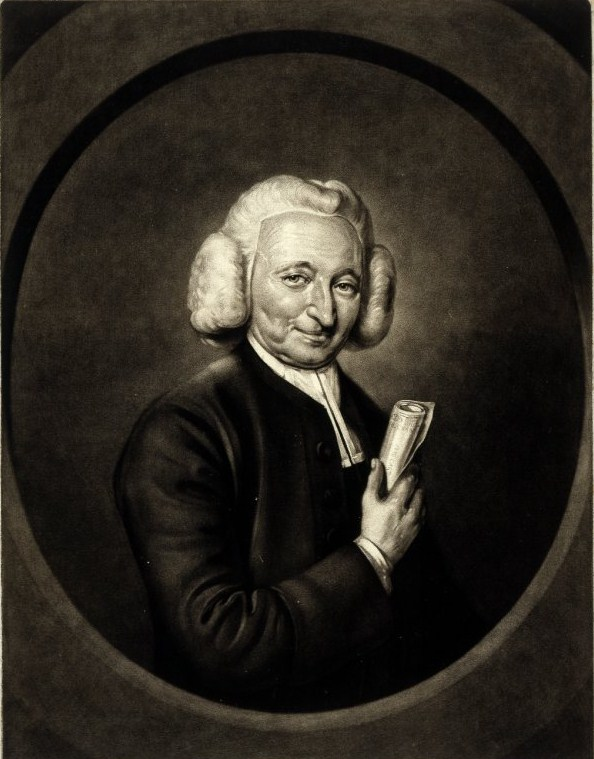
Andrew Gifford, 1774 engraving by Richard Houston after John Russell.

== Life ==
Gifford was the son of Emanuel Gifford, and grandson of Andrew Gifford, both Baptist ministers at Bristol. He was born on 17 August 1700, and was sent to the dissenting academy of Samuel Jones at Tewkesbury. He then studied for a time under Dr. John Ward.

Gifford seems to have performed ministerial work in Nottingham in 1725, and to have been assistant to his father at Bristol in 1726, in which year he was invited to become pastor of the congregation in Devonshire Square, London. He declined the position, but at the beginning of 1730 he accepted a call from the Baptist meeting in Eagle Street, London. He was chaplain to Sir Richard Ellys, and after Sir Richard's death to Lady Ellys, from 1731 to 1745. In 1754 he received the degree of D.D. from the University of Aberdeen.

Gifford collected coins, and was a fellow of the Society of Antiquaries of London. With influential friends including John Ward, one of the trustees, he was appointed assistant librarian in the British Museum in 1757. He held this office till his death on 19 June 1784. He was buried in Bunhill Fields burial ground.

== Works and legacy ==
Two of Gifford's sermons were published, one on The Great Storm in 1703,' 1734, and the other, preached ten days before his death, To the Friendly Society, 1784. He edited for the Society of Antiquaries Folkes' Tables of English Silver and Gold Coins, which was published in 2 vols. in 1763.

Gifford's collection of coins was purchased by George II for his private cabinet, but he left a collection of books, manuscripts, pictures, and curiosities to the Baptist academy at Bristol. Pastor of the Eagle Street meeting till his death, he bequeathed £400 to it, making the six deacons his executors.

== Family ==
Gifford's second wife, Grace Paynter, whom he married in 1737, died in 1762. She brought him a fortune of £6,000. He had no children.
