= Lincoln Fitzgerald =

American casino operator (1892–1981)

- 1949
- Born: October 21, 1892; San Francisco, California, US
- Died: April 18, 1981 (aged 88); Washoe, Nevada, US
- Resting place: Mountain View Cemetery in Washoe, Nevada
- Other names: Fitz
- Occupation: Casino owner
- Years active: 1946–1981
- Known for: Fitzgeralds Casino & Hotel, Reno
- Criminal charges: Bribery and illegal gambling operations charges
- Criminal penalty: US$52,000 in fines and court costs
- Spouse: Meta née Konarske

Lincoln Fitzgerald (October 21, 1892 – April 18, 1981) was an American casino owner who operated three casinos in Nevada. He previously operated gambling establishments in Michigan, but in 1946 he moved to Reno, Nevada and opened The Nevada Club. In 1949, he survived a murder attempt in his garage. In 1976, he opened the largest of his casinos, the 16-story Fitzgeralds Casino & Hotel, Reno.

After his death a hoard of his belongings was discovered in a warehouse, which included casino chips and some 100,000 American silver dollars. The entire collection was purchased by famous coin dealer Ron Gillio, who named it the Fitzgerald Hoard.

== Early life ==
Fitzgerald was born in San Francisco, California on October 21, 1892 and had a brother named Stanton. Lincoln Fitzgerald was a United States Army veteran and served in World War I. While in Detroit, Michigan, Fitzgerald was a gambler and he became associated with the Detroit Purple Gang. The Purple Gang was a group of criminals primarily of Jewish descent who were associated with prostitution, gambling, bootlegging, and murder.

== Career ==
Fitzgerald and his partner Danny Sullivan operated several gambling establishments in Detroit. One of his establishments was called the Detroit Gambling Club. In 1946, the two arrived in Reno with a truck full of gambling equipment. In 1946, the partners opened a downtown Reno casino which they called The Nevada Club.

Fitzgerald and Sullivan had been charged with bribery and illegal gambling operations in Macomb County, Michigan. They eventually settled the matter by paying US$52,000 in fines and court costs. Fitzgerald opened the Nevada Club in 1946 and operated it until his death in 1981. In 1976, he opened a larger 16-story casino which he named Fitzgeralds Casino & Hotel. At the time of his death, he was operating three casinos, Fitzgeralds Casino & Hotel (Reno) the Nevada Club (Reno), and the Nevada Lodge of Lake Tahoe.

== Murder attempt ==
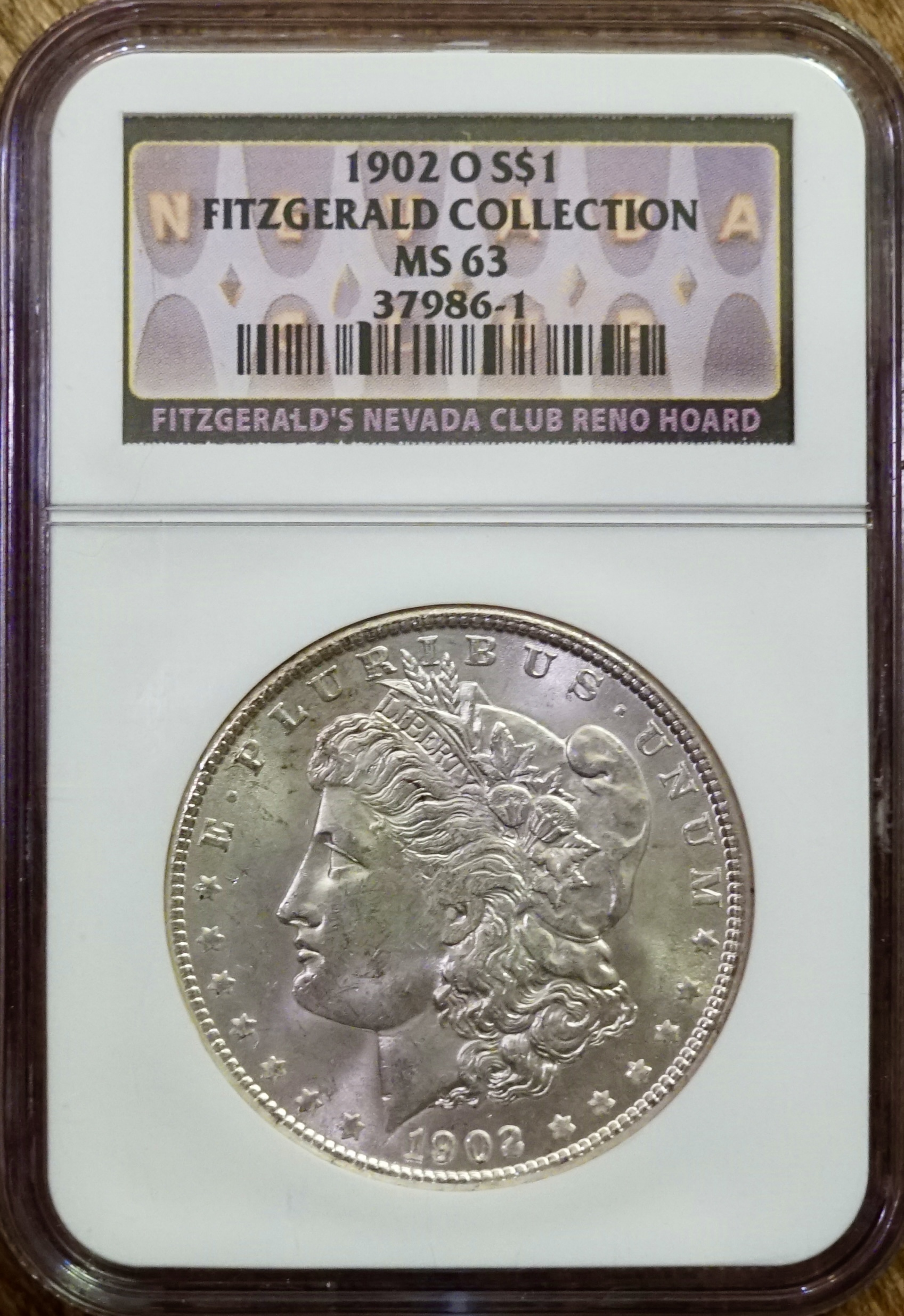
1902-O NGC graded Morgan silver dollar from the Fitzgerald Hoard

Just after midnight on November 19, 1949, Fitzgerald was badly wounded when an assailant shot him in the right side with a shotgun. The assailant fired a second time towards Fitzgerald's head but missed. When he was brought to the hospital, it was thought that he would be paralyzed. The shotgun was held so close to Fitzgerald's side that the wadding from the shell was embedded in his body. His wife Meta heard the shots and ran outside to see him slumped down on the floor of the garage. The shotgun blast had damaged his spine and he had more than 110 shotgun pellets lodged in his body. His liver was badly damaged and a number of pellets could not be removed. The shooter was never found. Authorities suspected that the murder attempt may have been the work of the Purple Gang. After the shooting and his recovery he began staying at the Nevada Club casino. He walked with a limp for the rest of his life. He stayed on the second floor of The Nevada Club in a steel-walled apartment. He was referred to as reclusive by the Reno Gazette-Journal.

== Personal life ==
Fitzgerald was married to Meta née Konarske. After he survived the 1949 murder attempt, he became more reclusive and rarely left his casino and home. He also began storing silver dollars and other collectable casino items in a Reno Nevada warehouse. After his death, a California coin dealer named Ron Gillio purchased all of the items from the warehouse. Gillio called the items in the warehouse the Fitzgerald Hoard. Among the items in the hoard were casino chips and 100,000 American silver dollars.

He was hospitalized at Washoe Medical Center on March 31, 1981, and died there on April 18, 1981. He had been suffering from an upper respiratory tract infection.

== See also ==
- List of coin collectors
