= Walter J. Husak =

American activist and writer (1942–2022)

- Born: May 27, 1942
- Died: December 15, 2022 (aged 80); Santa Barbara, California, U.S.
- Occupations: Philanthropist; Coin Collector
- Relatives: Marissa Yardley Clifford (granddaughter)

Walter J. Husak (May 27, 1942 – December 15, 2022) was an American businessman who was the owner of the HK Aerospace manufacturing company in Burbank, California. Aside from ventures in the aerospace industry, Husak was also an avid collector of rare coins. On February 15, 2008, Heritage Auctions sold his collection of 301 rare cents in Long Beach, California. Two of the cents went for $632,500 a piece. The entire collection sold for approximately $10.7 million.

Walter Husak began collecting coins in 1955 at the age of 13 when he was spending a summer in Iowa at his grandparents’ farm. Husak purchased his first large cent in June, 1980 - an 1804 large cent. In 1986, he purchased his first Sheldon-13. At the end of 1994, he decided to try to collect all of the Sheldon varieties, and over the next decade built one of the most important Sheldon collections in the world. He appeared as guest on the History Channel's Pawn Stars and Coinweek. His collection also includes a Half Disme coin and a Libertas Americana Medal. He also founded the Liberty Cap Foundation in 2009 to further research and education regarding American coin history.

On December 15, 2022, at the age of 80, Husak died at Cottage Hospital in Santa Barbara, California, from heart related complications.
