= Victor Dubreuil =

Victor Dubreuil (French pronunciation: [viktɔʁ dybʁœj]; né Marie Victor Théodore Dubreuil 8 November 1842–date of death unknown) was a French–American artist known for his trompe l'oeil paintings of money.

== Personal life ==
Dubreuil was born on 8 November 1842, at Ayron, near Poitiers, France. He married Virginie Lenoir in 1878. Dubreuil immigrated to the United States, arriving June 6, 1882. He became a naturalized United States citizen June 5, 1888.

== Career ==
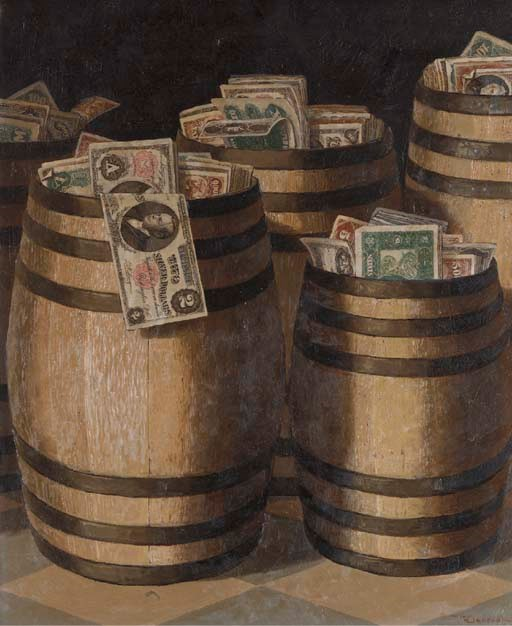
Dubreuil's Barrels of Money

After joining the army and fighting in the Second Franco-Mexican and Franco-Prussian wars, Dubreuil moved to Paris and worked as a bank director.

He became a socialist agitator, founded both a newspaper and an African development company, then absconded having been charged with stealing half a million francs. He emigrated to the United States of America in 1882.

Once in the United States, he taught himself to paint, specializing in very realistic depictions of money.

From 1887 to 1889, Dubreuil had a studio at 196 7th Avenue, and from 1895 to 1896, he was painting at 110 West 44th Street in Manhattan. He has been described as having painted in the Hartnett School.

See: William Michael Harnett (1848–1892)

== Works ==
- American Paper Currency
- Barrels of Money
- The Cross of Gold
- Fresh Peanuts
- Grover Cleveland
- Money to Burn
- Napoleon Commanding a View of the Prisoners
- One Dollar Silver Certificate
- Tronpe L'Oeil Still Life with Dollar Bill and Fly
- Safe Money
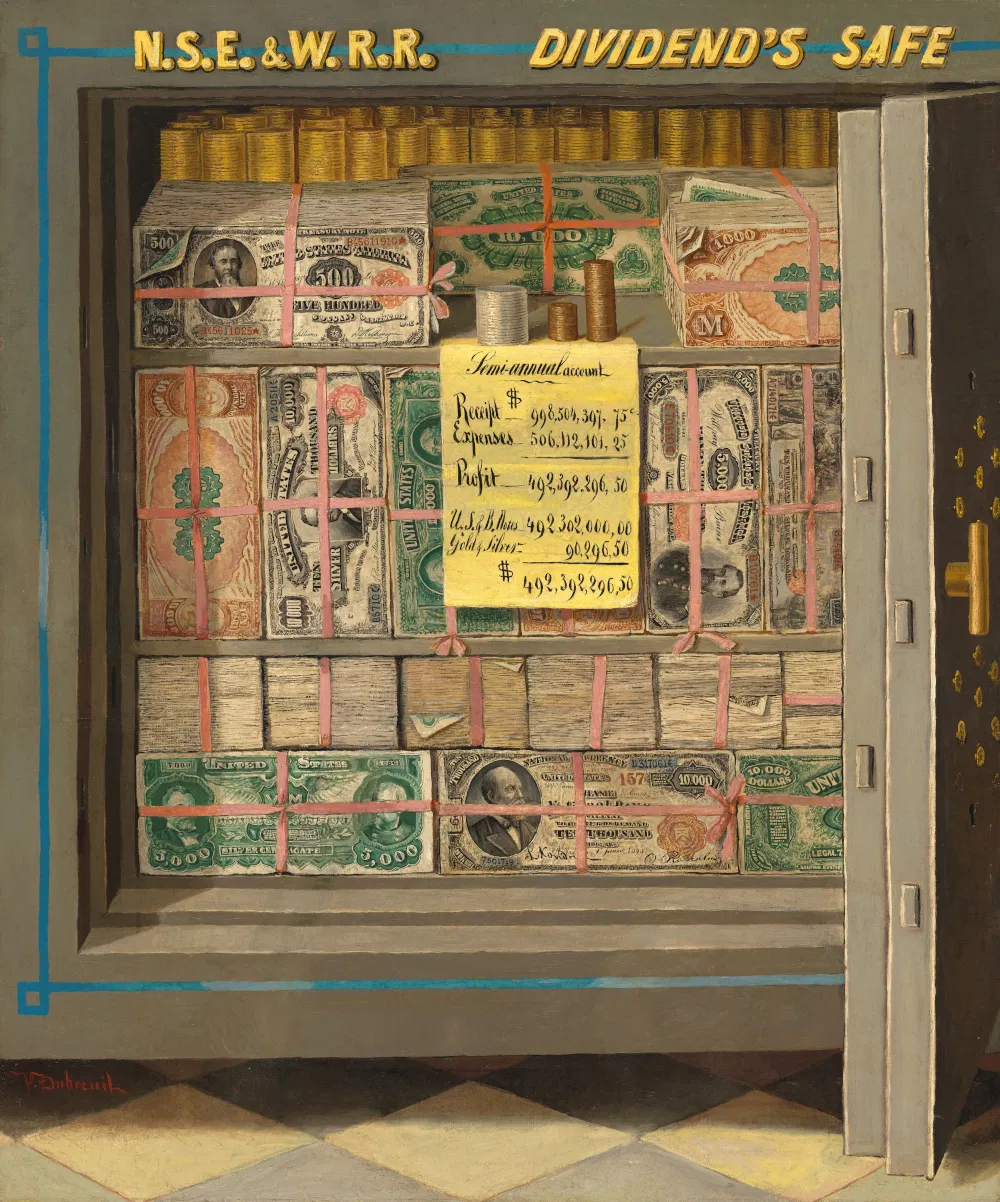
  Old image of safe of dividends
- Take One, oil on canvass
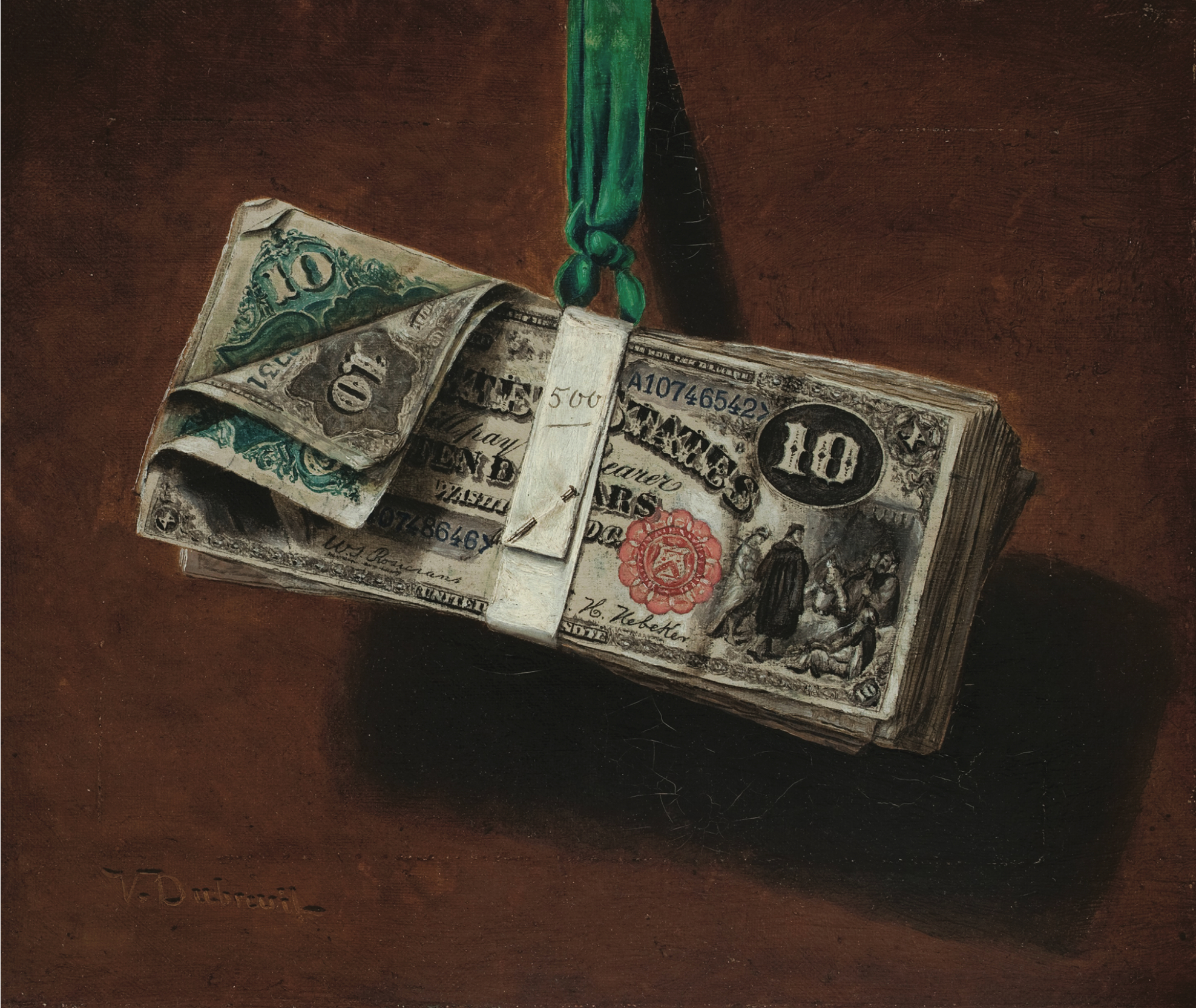

== Bibliography ==
=== References ===
- Evans, Dorinda, PhD (25 January 2023). "Illusory Wealth, Victor Dubreuil's Cryptic Currencies". Public Domain Review (The).
- "Paints Millions But Hasn't a Cent – Victor Dubreuil Has Been a Little of Everything, But Still Hopes to Make a Fortune – Freaks of an Anarchist Genius". The World. Vol. 34, no. 11737. New York. 8 October 1893. p. 26 (column 6). Retrieved August 7, 2024. OCLC 32646018 (all editions).
1. Via Newspapers.com.
2. Via "Fultonhistory.com" (PDF).
- U.S. Naturalization: "Dubreuil, Marie V.T". New York Court of Common Pleas. Naturalized June 5, 1888. Vol. 625, Record No. 132. Washington, D.C.: National Archives. Retrieved August 7, 2024.
1. Collection: New York City Naturalization Index (Soundex), 1792–1906. Microfilm Serial: M1674; Microfilm Roll: 53. Via FamilySearch.
  1. Index Card: "Marie V.T. Dubreuil" (digital image 1678 of 5669).
2. Collection: New York County Naturalization Records, 1791–1980. Via FamilySearch.
  2. Index Card: "Dubreuil, Marie V.T." (digital image 5105 of 5840).
3. Collection: New York County Naturalization Records, 1791–1992. Microfilm Serial: M1674; Microfilm Roll: 53. Via Ancestry.com.
  3. Index Card: "Dubreuil, Marie V.T".
4. Collection: New York County Naturalization Records, 1791–1943. National Archives Index No.: 5700802; Record Group Title: Records of District Courts of the United States, 1685–2009; Record Group Number 21. Via Ancestry.com.
  4. Naturalization Petition: "Marie V.T. Dubreuil".
