= James Dodsley Cuff =

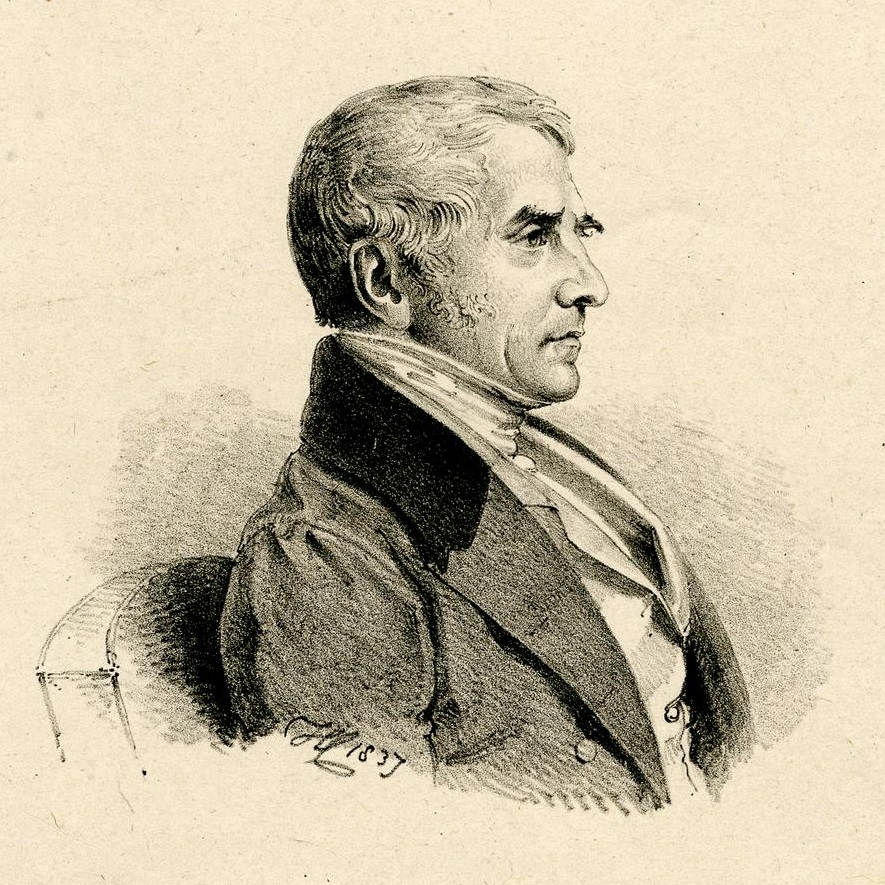
Lithograph of Cuff by Henry Corbould, 1837.

James Dodsley Cuff (June 1781 – September 28, 1853) was an English numismatist and coin collector.

Cuff was baptised in Corsley on 5 July 1781 aged 15 weeks he was the son of Caleb and Kitty Cuff. He worked for the Bank of England for 48 years. His position in the Bullion Office enabled him to obtain specimens of rare coins, including five examples of the Dorrien and Magens shilling. He was a founding member of the Royal Numismatic Society and a Fellow of the Society of Antiquaries of London.

Cuff sold part of his collection of British coins to the British Museum in 1839, while the remainder was sold at auction by Sotheby's after his death. The auction took 18 days and brought more than £7000.

Through what Henry Noel Humphreys calls his "sagacious ingenuity", Cuff was able to determine that coins bearing the mark of Thomas Rotherham, Archbishop of York, belonged to the reign of Henry VII rather than Henry VI.
