= Electricity as the Dominant Force in the World =

1896 US five-dollar silver certificate

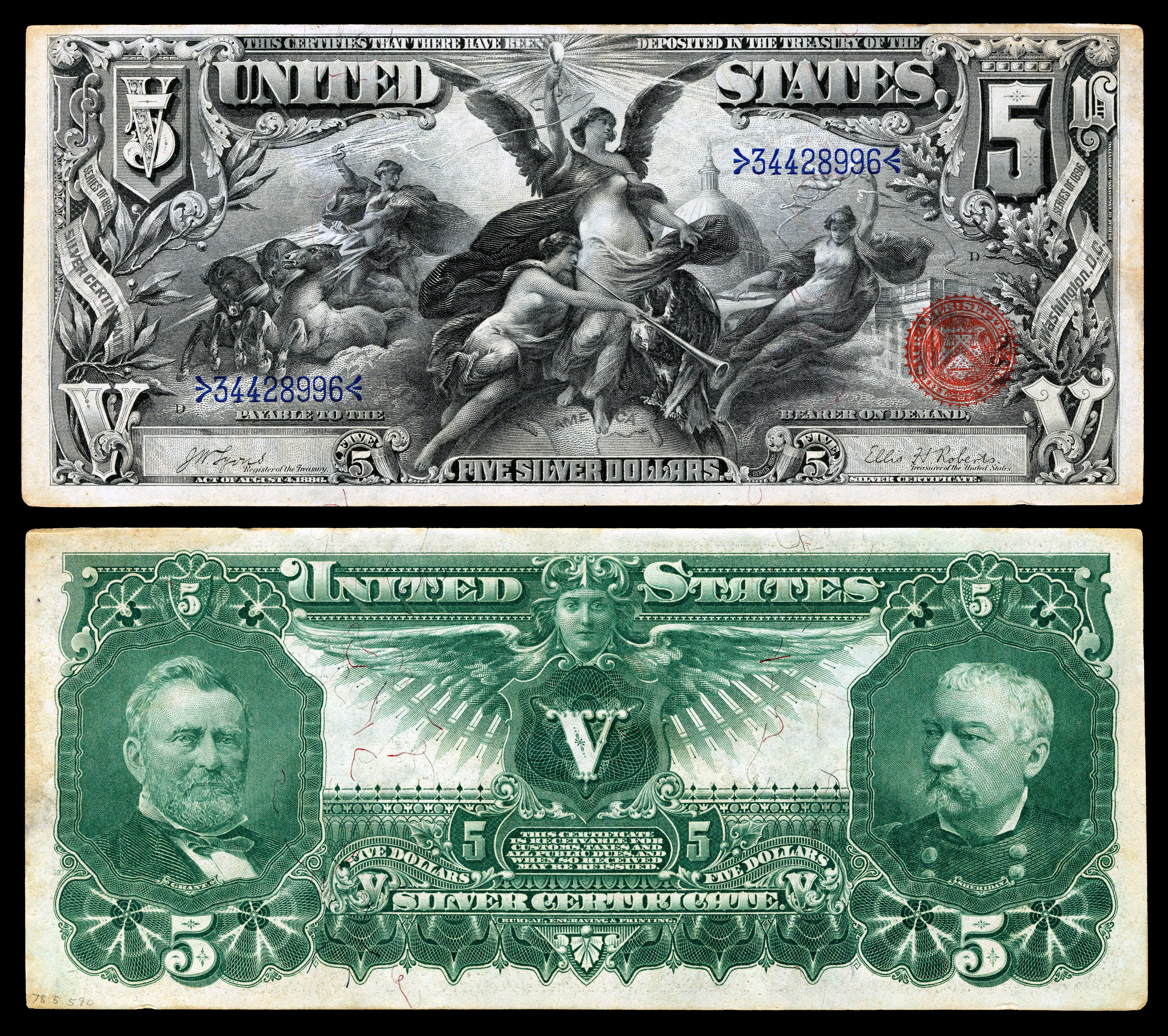
US $5 Electricity as the Dominant Force in the World

Electricity as the Dominant Force in the World is an 1896 United States five-dollar silver certificate. It is of the US large-size variety measuring 7.375 in (187.3 mm) by 3.125 in (79.4 mm). The note is one of three notes that are part of the "Educational Series". As a result of the nudity portrayed on the obverse and other controversies, the note was replaced in 1899.

== Description ==
The overall design is based on an image from painter Walter Shirlaw's work. The obverse of the note features an allegorical image of people showing the power of electricity. Electricity is represented by the figure of a mature woman. The figure of the woman is meant to represent America and she is holding a lightbulb over her head. There are a total of five women pictured on the obverse. The obverse also features the Roman god Jupiter, riding in a chariot while wielding a lightning bolt in his hand. Also on the obverse is a woman with a trumpet and a bald eagle. To the right along with the eagle is a woman representing Peace, holding a dove.

The text on the obverse states: "This certifies that there have been deposited in the Treasury of The United States five silver dollars Payable to the Bearer on demand Five (5) Series of 1896 silver certificate. The reverse features an engraving of president Ulysses S. Grant and General Philip Sheridan. The reverse also features a winged female figure in the center with a large Roman numeral "V" on her chest.

The note is of the US large size variety at 7.375 in (187.3 mm) by 3.125 in (79.4 mm). The currency notes in use today in the United States are 6.14 in (156 mm) by 2.61 in (66 mm).

== History ==
The 1896 "Educational Series" included the one-dollar History Instructing Youth bill, the two-dollar Science presenting steam and electricity to Commerce and Manufacture bill, and Electricity as the Dominant Force in the World. American painter Walter Shirlaw accepted a commission from the United States Bureau of Engraving and Printing to execute the image Electricity Presenting Light to the World. G.F.C. Smillie executed the engraving for the obverse based on the Walter Shirlaw image. Smillie also did the engraving for the border elements on the reverse.

The portraits of Ulysses S. Grant and Philip Sheridan on the reverse were engraved by Lorenzo Hatch. Thomas F. Morris was responsible for the overall design and border elements.

== Controversy ==
The notes came to be called "dirty dollars" because of the portrayal of unclothed women. Because of the controversy engravers reissued the note in 1897 with more clothing on the women. Some complaints also centered on the skin color of the women on the note. Bank tellers also objected to the nudity displayed on the note. The notes also did not have complicated lathework on the obverse so counterfeiters could potentially forge the note more easily. The controversies caused the Bureau of Engraving and Printing to replace the note just three years after issue, in 1899.
