= Lorenzo Hatch =

American artist

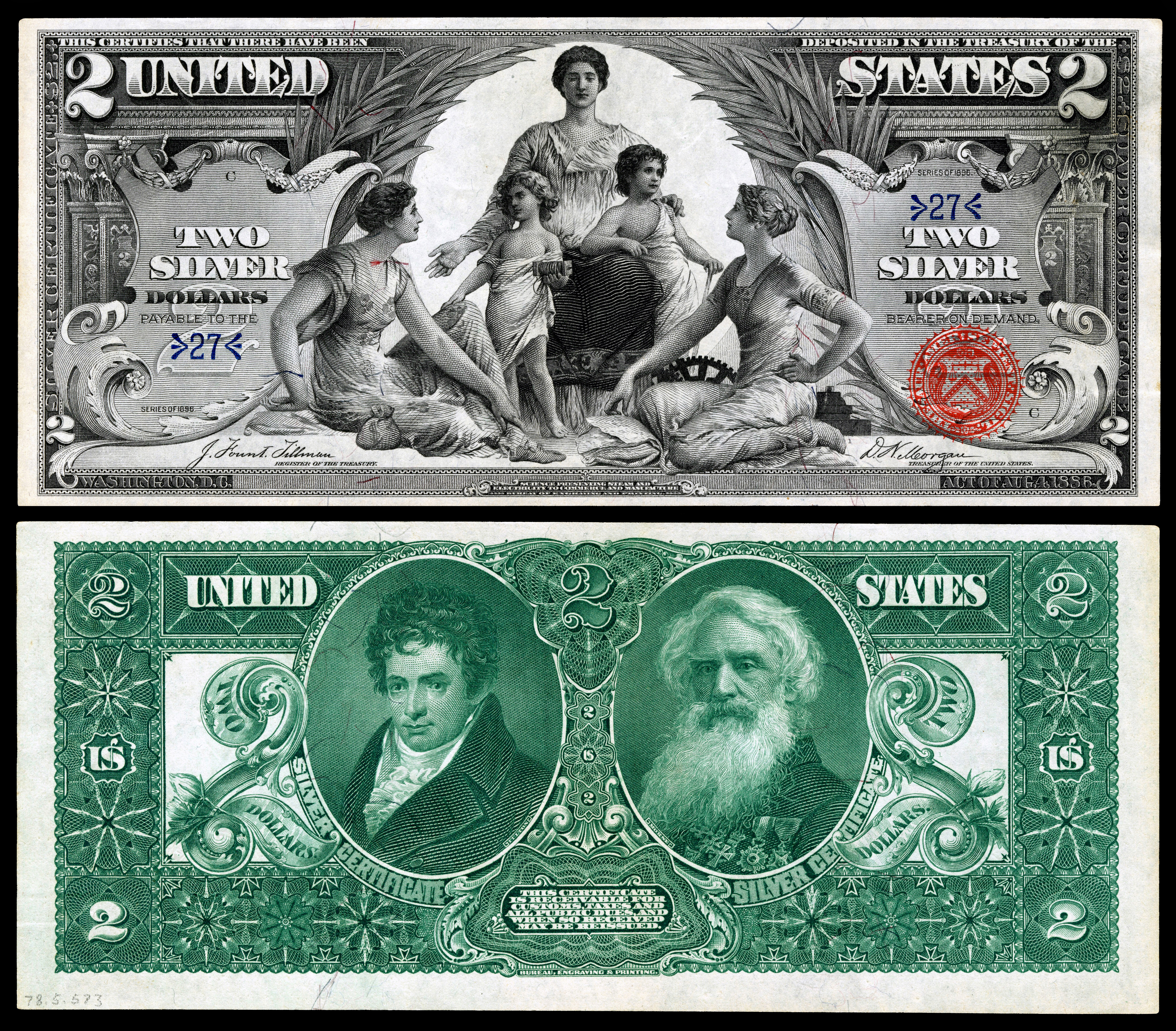
Series of 1896 United States two-dollar silver certificate, with reverse depicting Robert Fulton and Samuel Morse engraved by Lorenzo Hatch

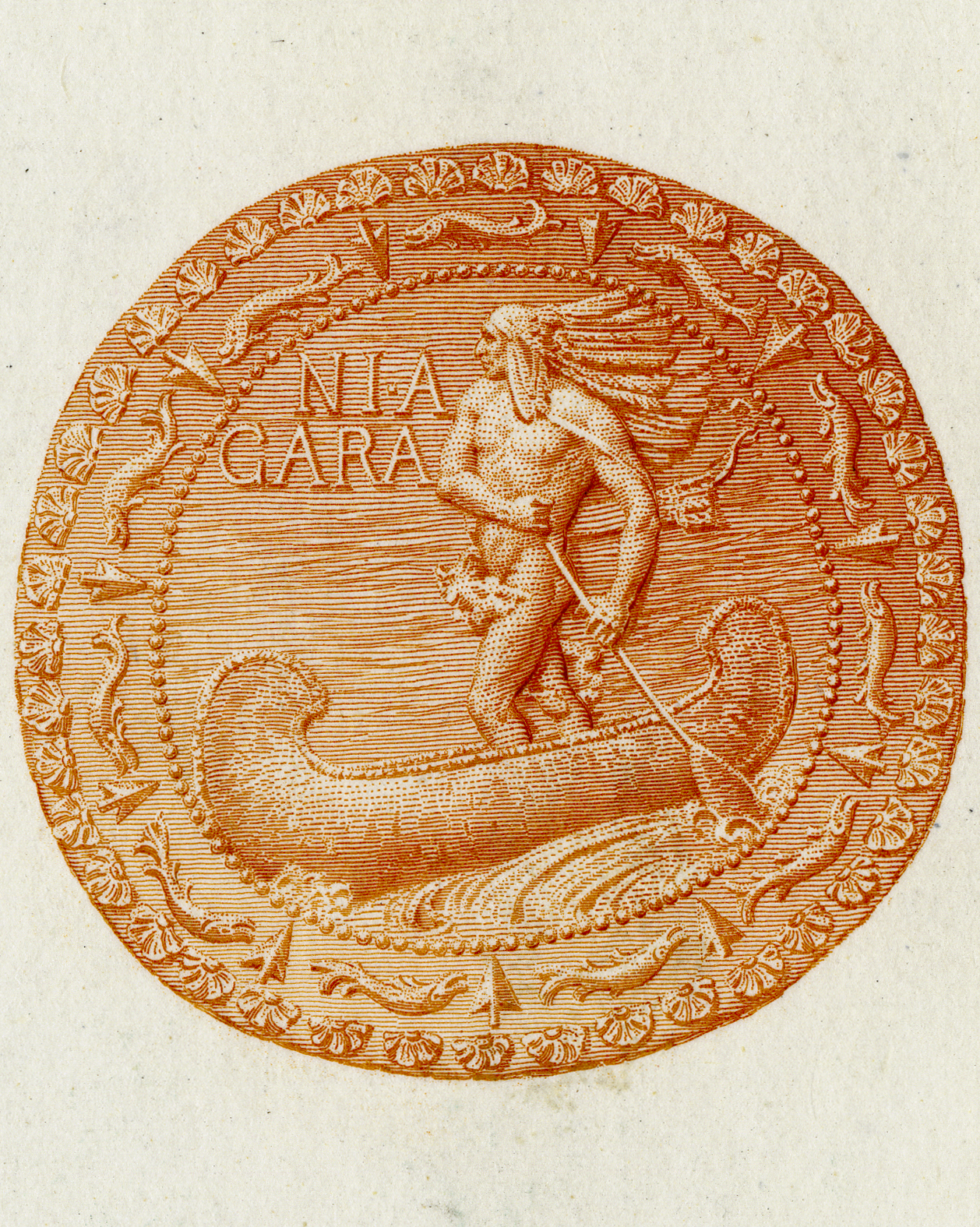
"NIAGARA" Native American engraving detail by Lorenzo Hatch

Lorenzo James Hatch (July 16, 1856 – February 3, 1914) was an American artist best known for his work as a portrait engraver in Washington, D.C., and New York. He worked for the United States Bureau of Engraving and Printing, private bank note printers, and in China, assisting the government with establishing a government bureau of engraving and printing.

== Biography ==
Hatch was born in Hartford, New York, and raised in Dorset, Vermont. He studied at the Washington Art Students' Club and with Robert Henri. Early in his career, he found his talent for engraving intricate portraits in metals. In 1874, the head of the United States Bureau of Engraving and Printing admired Hatch's portrait of George Washington on copper and hired him. During his time in Washington, D.C., Hatch spent his nights studying drawing and watercolor painting. However, his talent to engrave vignettes of presidents and other famous figures proved more impressive. In 1888, Hatch moved to Chicago to work for a private bank note company. There, he met Grace Harrison of California. They were married and had one son, Harrison in 1902. After taking a job in New York City with another bank note company, Hatch solidified his reputation in the field.

The portraits of Ulysses S. Grant and Philip Sheridan on the reverse of the 1896 US five-dollar bill (Electricity as the Dominant Force in the World) were engraved by Lorenzo Hatch. The reverse of the 1896 two-dollar silver certificate (Science presenting steam and electricity to Commerce and Manufacture) was designed by Thomas Morris. The two portraits of Samuel Morse and Robert Fulton were engraved by Lorenzo Hatch.

Around 1908, the Chinese government invited Hatch to establish a Bureau of Engraving and Printing modeled after that of the United States. He accepted a six-year contract to oversee the building of the bureau and train the Chinese to run the office. With his wife, their son, and sister-in-law Effie Harrision, Lorenzo moved to Peking. During his time in China, Lorenzo Hatch succeeded in building the foundations for a modern printing bureau. However, the Xinhai Revolution in China between 1911 and 1912 hindered completion. He described his experiences, perceptions, and insecurities of being in China to his family and friends through letters. Before his contract ended, Hatch died on February 3, 1914. His body was returned to Dorset, Vermont, and is buried in Maple Hill Cemetery across from his boyhood home.
