= Science presenting steam and electricity to Commerce and Manufacture =

1896 US two-dollar silver certificate

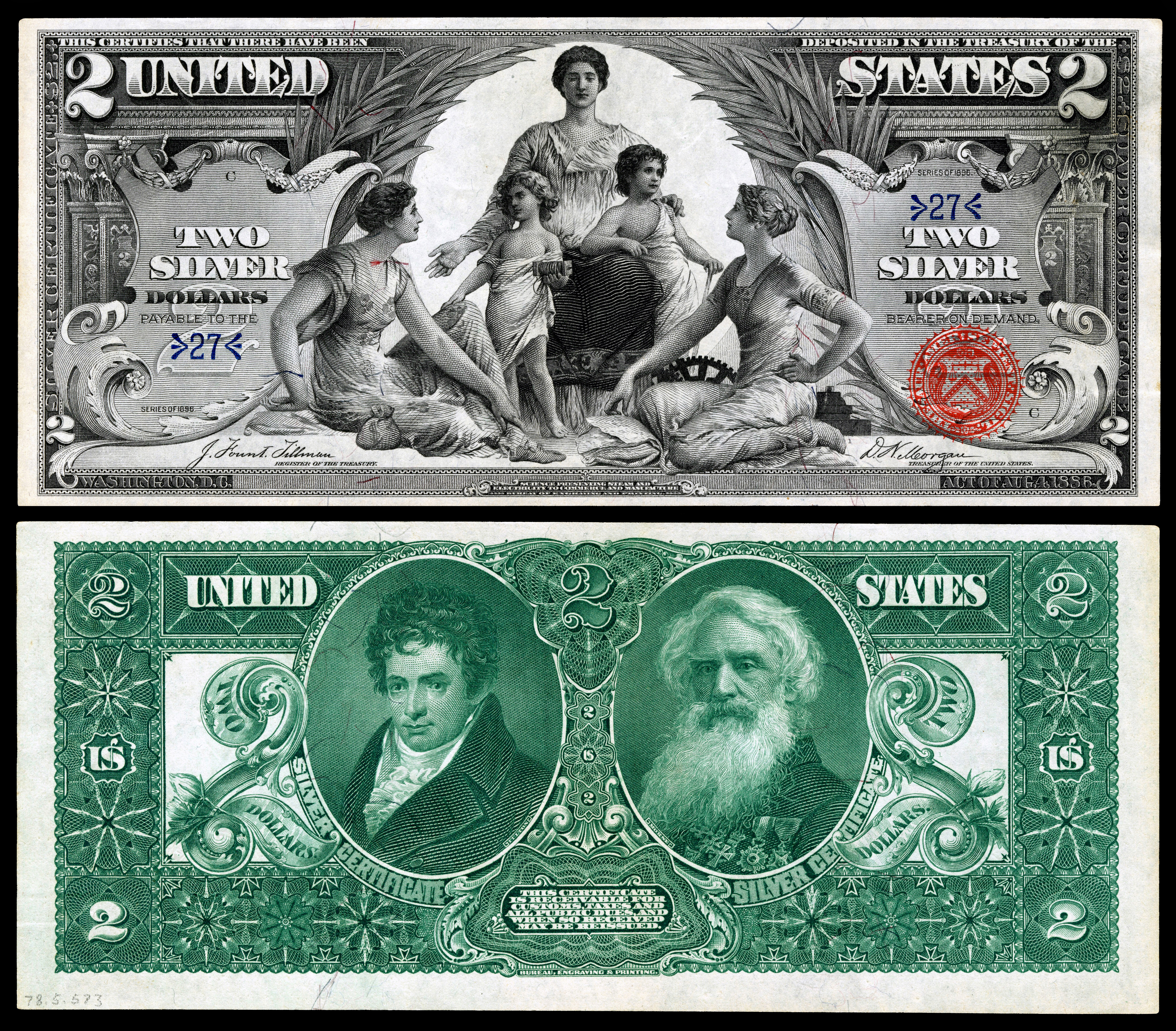
US $2 1896

Science presenting steam and electricity to Commerce and Manufacture is an 1896 United States two-dollar silver certificate. It is of the large-size variety measuring 7.375 in (187.3 mm) inches by 3.125 in (79.4 mm). It is one of three notes released as the "Educational Series". After complaints about the series, the note was replaced in 1899.

== Description ==
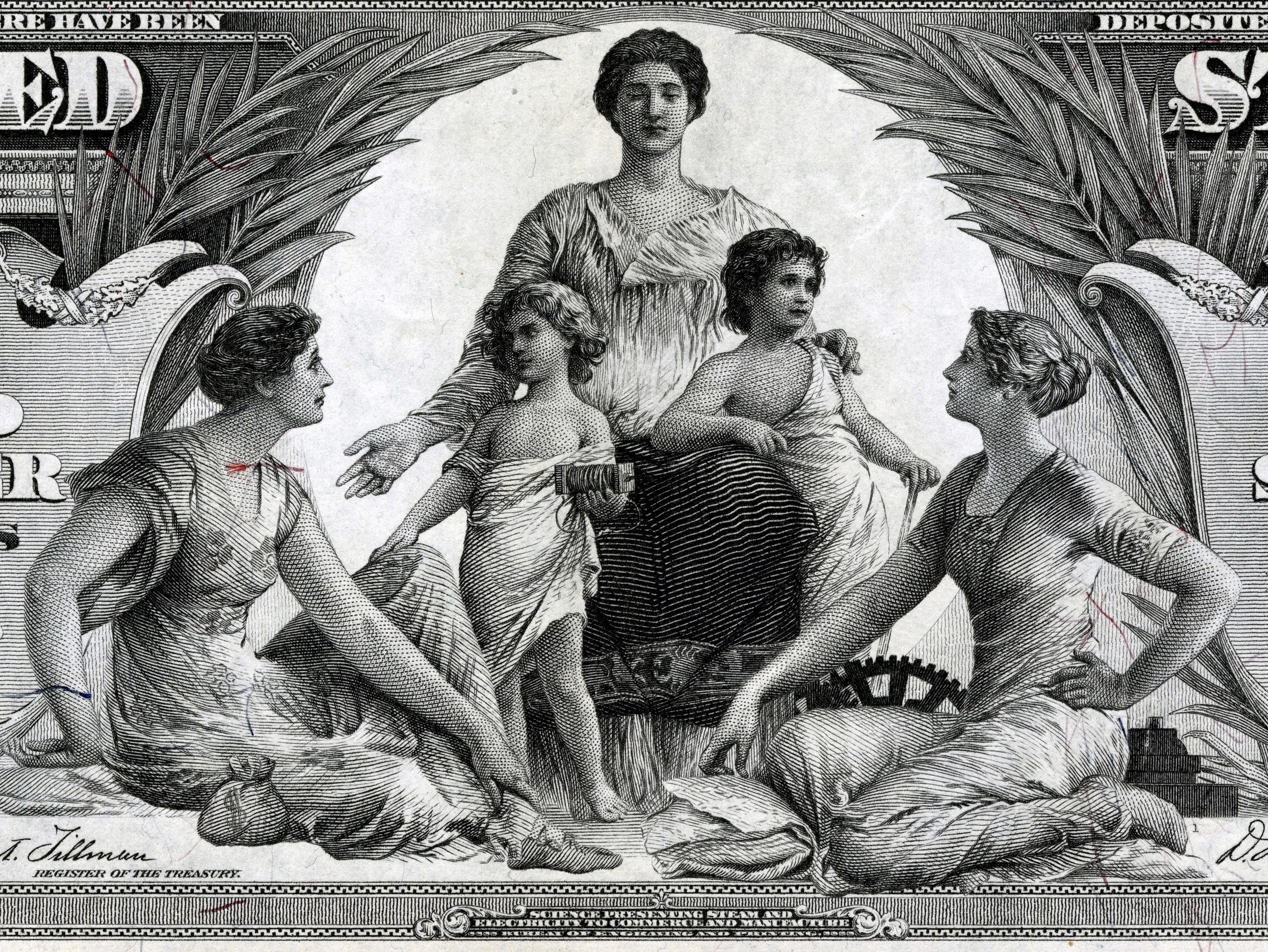
US $2 obverse portrait

American painter Edwin Blashfield designed the 1896 two-dollar note. The mural on the obverse features Science presenting Steam and Electricity. Science is seen behind two boys in the vignette. The figures of Steam and Electricity are represented by the children and Commerce and Manufacture are portrayed by the two adults. The reverse of the note features portraits of inventors Robert Fulton and Samuel Morse.

The note is of the US large size variety at 7.375 in (187.3 mm) inches by 3.125 in (79.4 mm). The currency notes in use today in the United States is 6.14 in (156 mm) by 2.61 in (66 mm).

== History ==
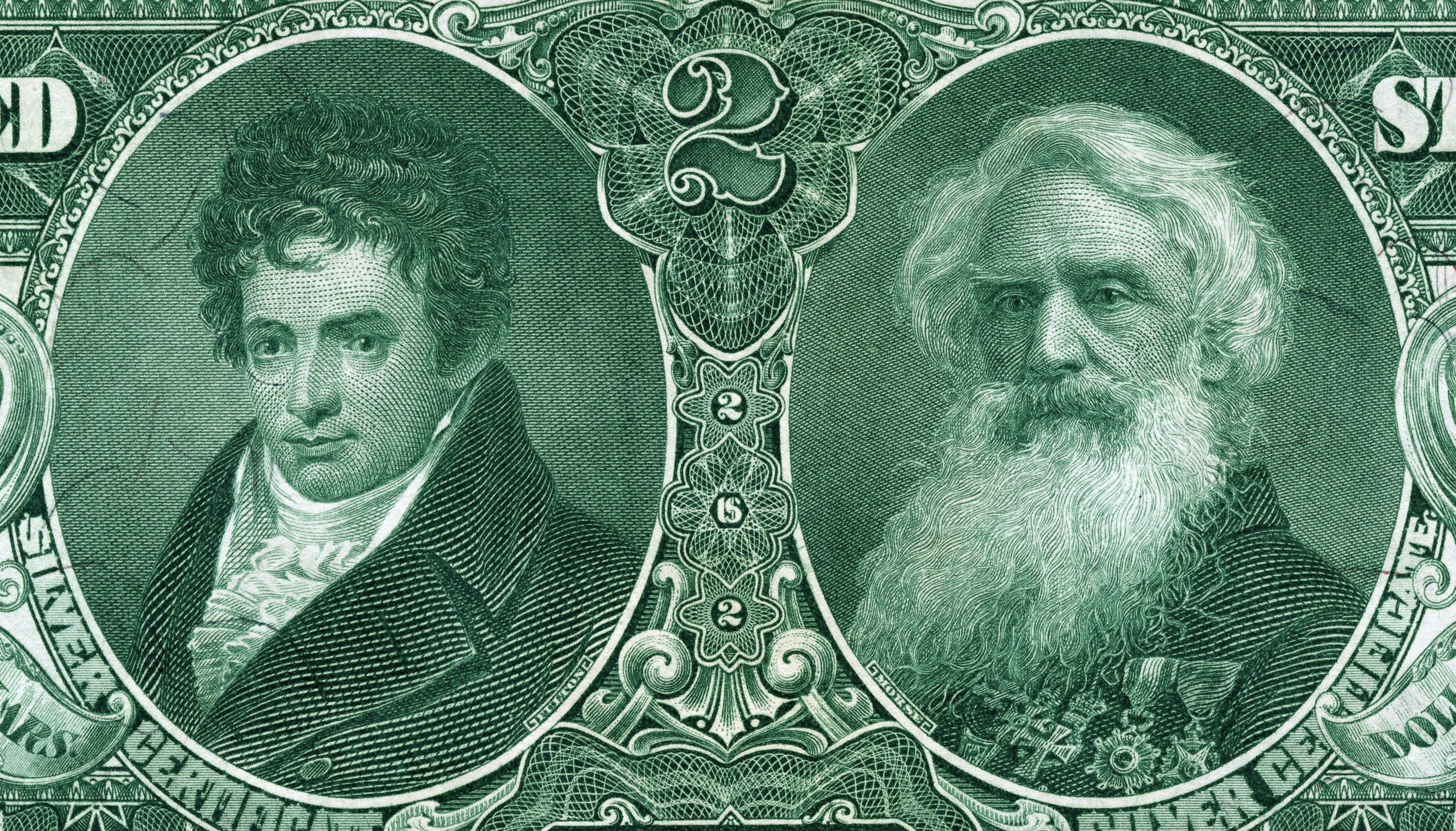
US $2 reverse featuring portraits of Samuel Morse and Robert Fulton

Blashfield's design for the obverse was originally slated for the fifty-dollar bill. The theme of steam and electricity are represented as children because they were new forms of power. The engravers who executed the design were G.F.C. Smillie and Charles Schlecht. There were three notes in the Educational Series and all women appeared on all three notes in the series: the $1, $2, and $5.

The reverse of the note was designed by Thomas Morris. The two portraits of Samuel Morse and Robert Fulton were engraved by Lorenzo Hatch.

== Controversy ==
The notes came to be called "dirty dollars" because of the portrayal of unclothed women. Because of the controversy engravers reissued the note in 1897 with more clothing on the women. Some complaints also centered on the skin color of the women on the note. Bank tellers also objected to the nudity displayed on the note. The notes also did not have complicated lathework on the front so counterfeiters could forge the note more easily. The controversies caused the Bureau of Engraving and Printing to replace the note just three years after issue, in 1899.
