= George Frederick Cumming Smillie =

American portrait engraver (1854–1924)

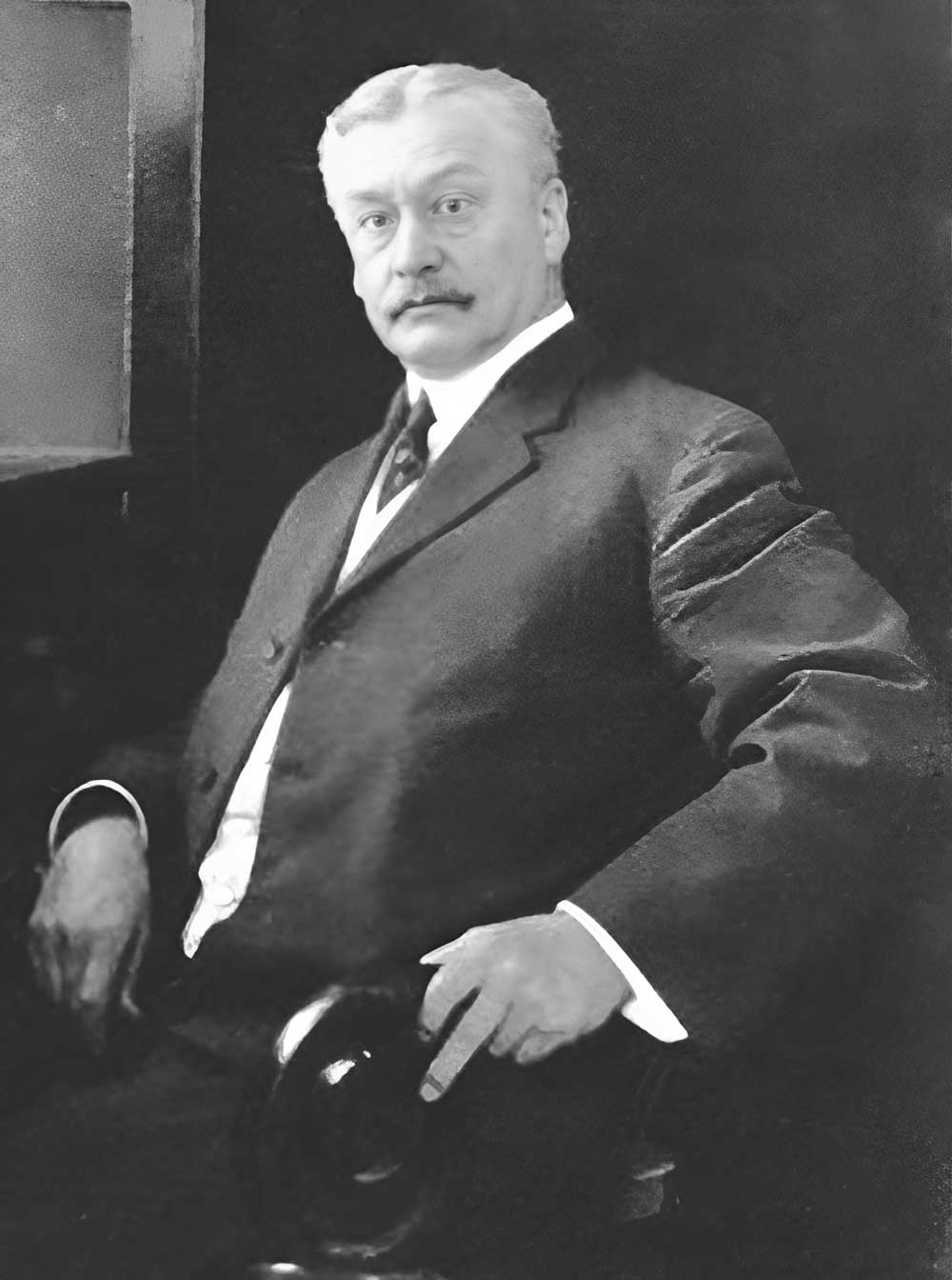
- c. 1924
- Born: November 22, 1854; New York City, US
- Died: January 21, 1924 (aged 69); Washington, D.C., US
- Other name: Fred
- Occupation: Engraver
- Years active: 1871–1922
- Known for: Engraving portraits on US currency
- Notable work: Banknote portraits of US presidents
- Style: steel-plate engraving

Signature
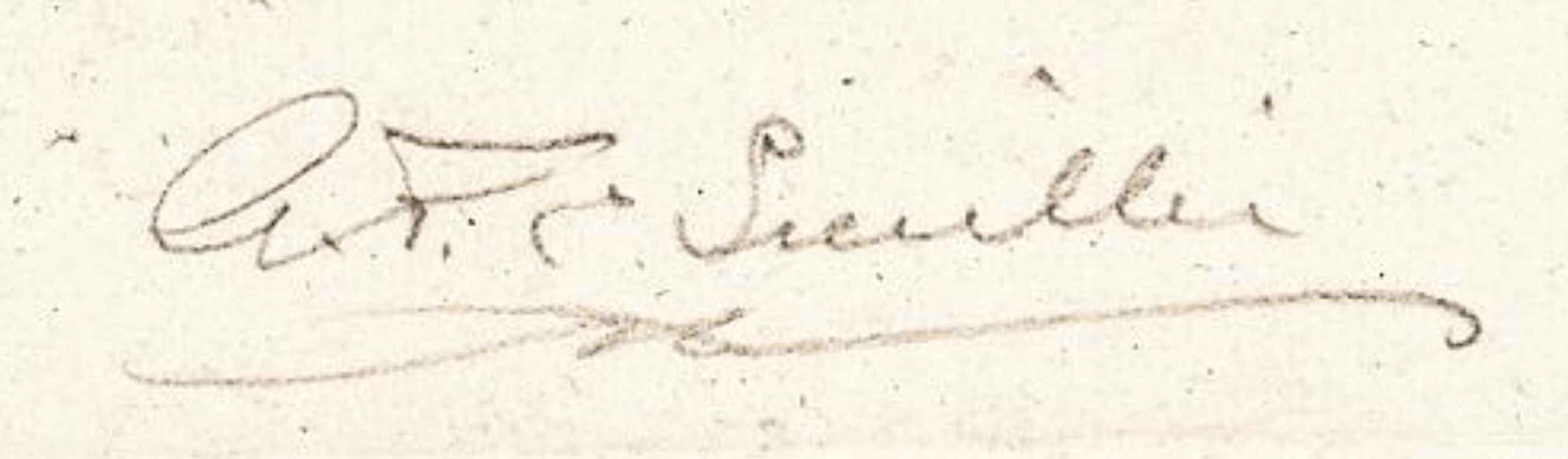

George Frederick Cumming Smillie (November 22, 1854 – January 21, 1924) also known as G.F.C. Smillie or Fred Smillie was an engraver for the United States Treasury who engraved portraits for the U.S. Bureau of Engraving and Printing (BEP) from 1894 to 1922. The nephew of James David Smillie, he engraved the portrait of Running Antelope (1899 United States five-dollar Silver Certificate) and the presidents Abraham Lincoln, Ulysses S. Grant, Woodrow Wilson, and George Washington. Several of his engravings appeared on banknotes, including the Black Eagle Silver Certificate, the United States one-hundred-thousand-dollar bill, and Electricity as the Dominant Force in the World.

== Life and career ==
Fred Smillie was born in November 22, 1854, in New York City to David Smillie Jr. and Margaret Smillie. Several members of the Smillie family were associated with the design of currency. He showed an aptitude for art and engraving as a boy. When he was 17 years old he learned engraving by working with his uncle James David Smillie at the American Banknote Company. In his career he worked for several other banknote companies. In 1894 he began working as an engraver for the U.S. Bureau of Engraving and Printing (BEP), at which he was earning $6,000 (equivalent to $232,200 in 2025) per year in 1895. He was made the superintendent of portrait engraving in 1918. His portraits and vignettes appeared on stamps, currencies and securities. He was a steel-plate engraver and was known for his engravings of presidential portraits.

Smillie engraved the portrait of Chief Tatoka-Inyanka (Running Antelope) of the Hunkpapa Sioux which is found on the large size 1899 United States five-dollar Silver Certificate. During the photoshoot Running Antelope wore his three-feathered headdress but when engraving for the note, his headdress did not fit in the space of the 1899 five-dollar Silver Certificate. Smillie found an image of a feathered–war bonnet that was likely Pawnee and he used it in the engraving. Because of the incorrect headdress, the engraved portrait was controversial.

He also engraved the portraits of Presidents Abraham Lincoln and Ulysses S. Grant which are found on the obverse of the 1899 series Black Eagle Silver Certificate. Smillie also did the engraving for the portrait of Woodrow Wilson on the United States one-hundred-thousand-dollar bill. His engravings can be seen on the 1896 five-dollar bill (Electricity as the Dominant Force in the World), the 1899 five-dollar bill (Chief), the 1899 two-dollar bill, the 1923 one-dollar bill and other banknotes and checks. He also completed engravings such as "The Reapers" which were used in the background of banknotes. His engraving of George Washington was used on several different banknotes. Smillie retired from the BEP on March 31, 1922.

== Gallery ==
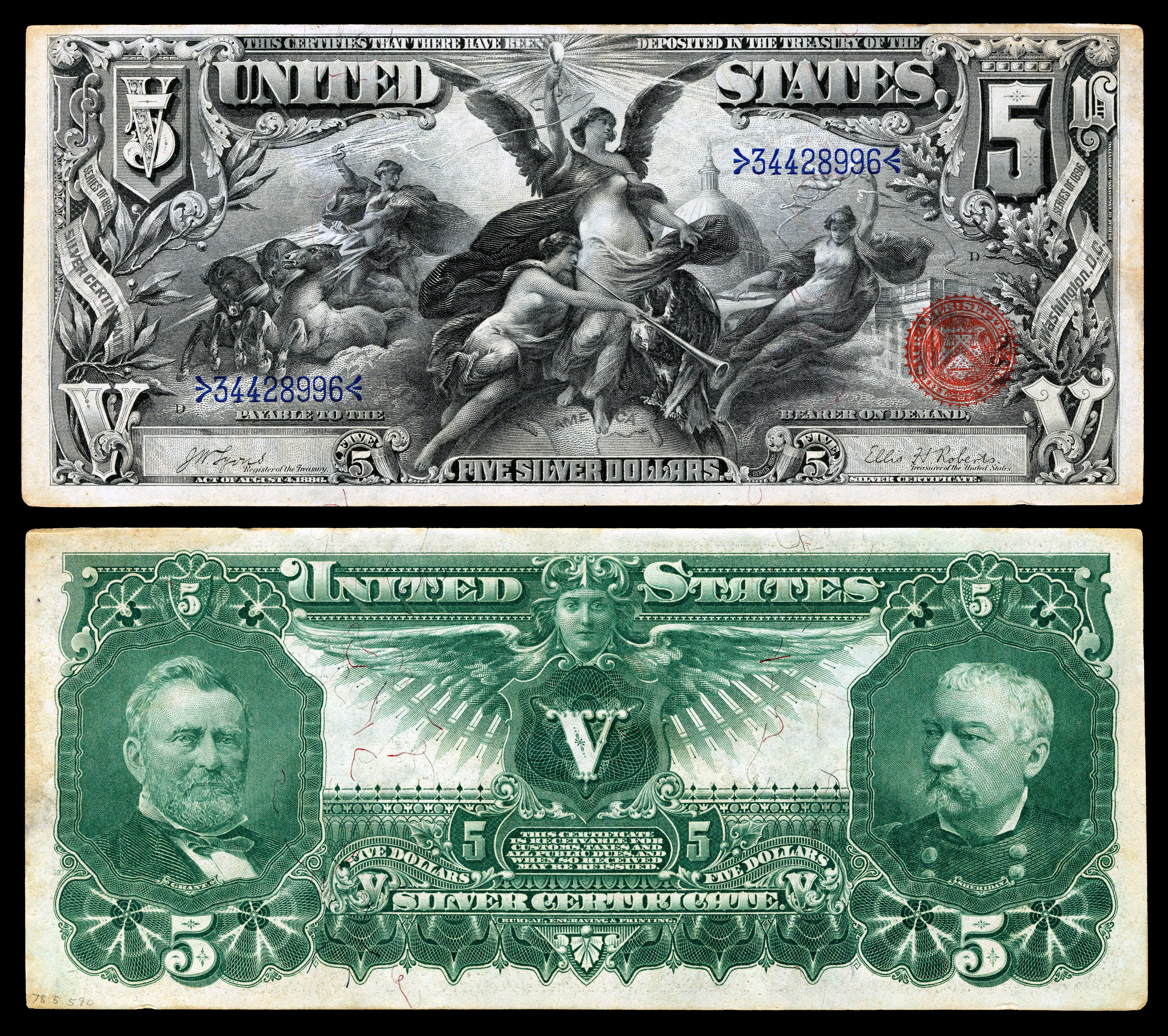
1896 five-dollar bill

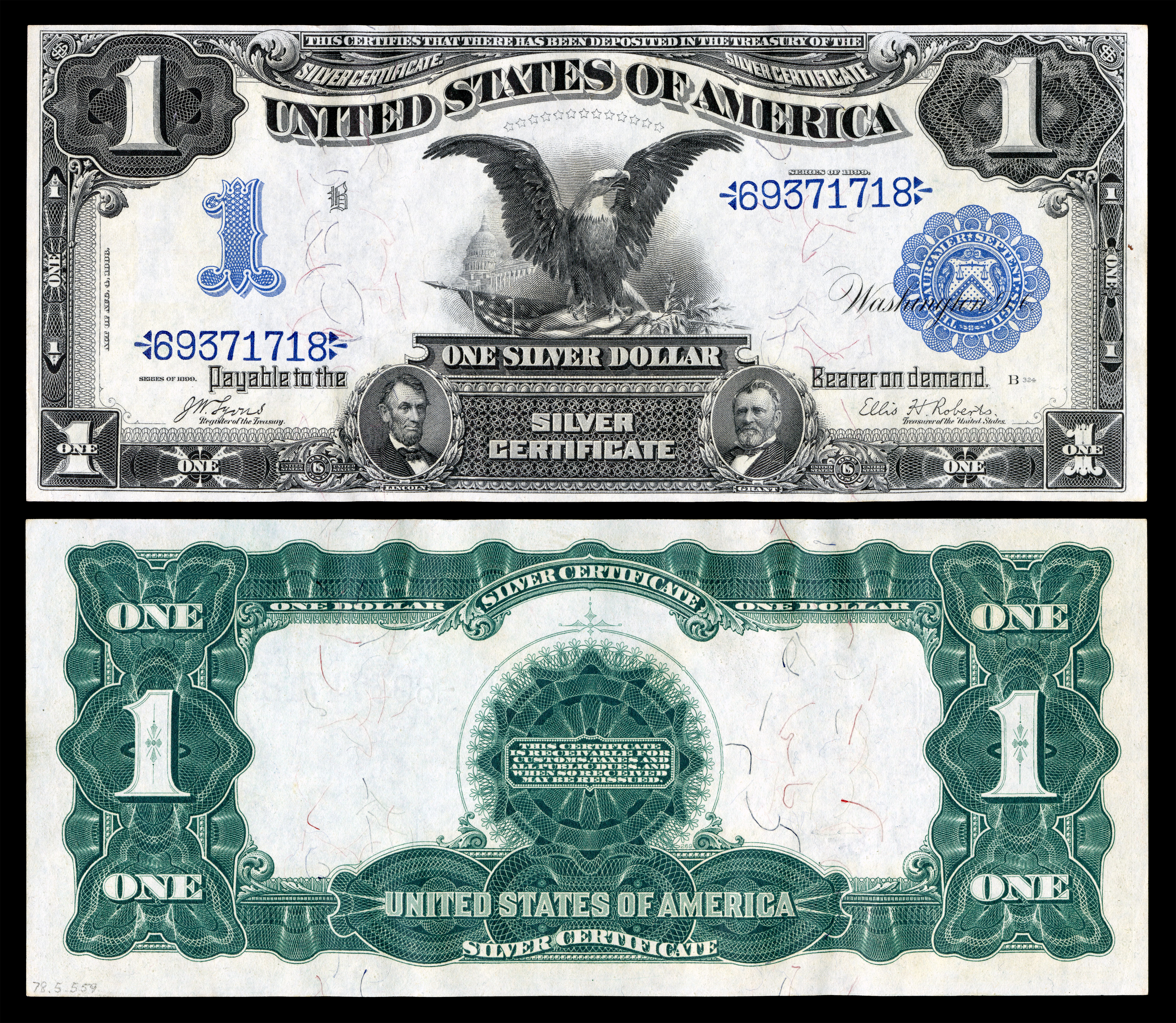
1899 Black Eagle Silver Certificate

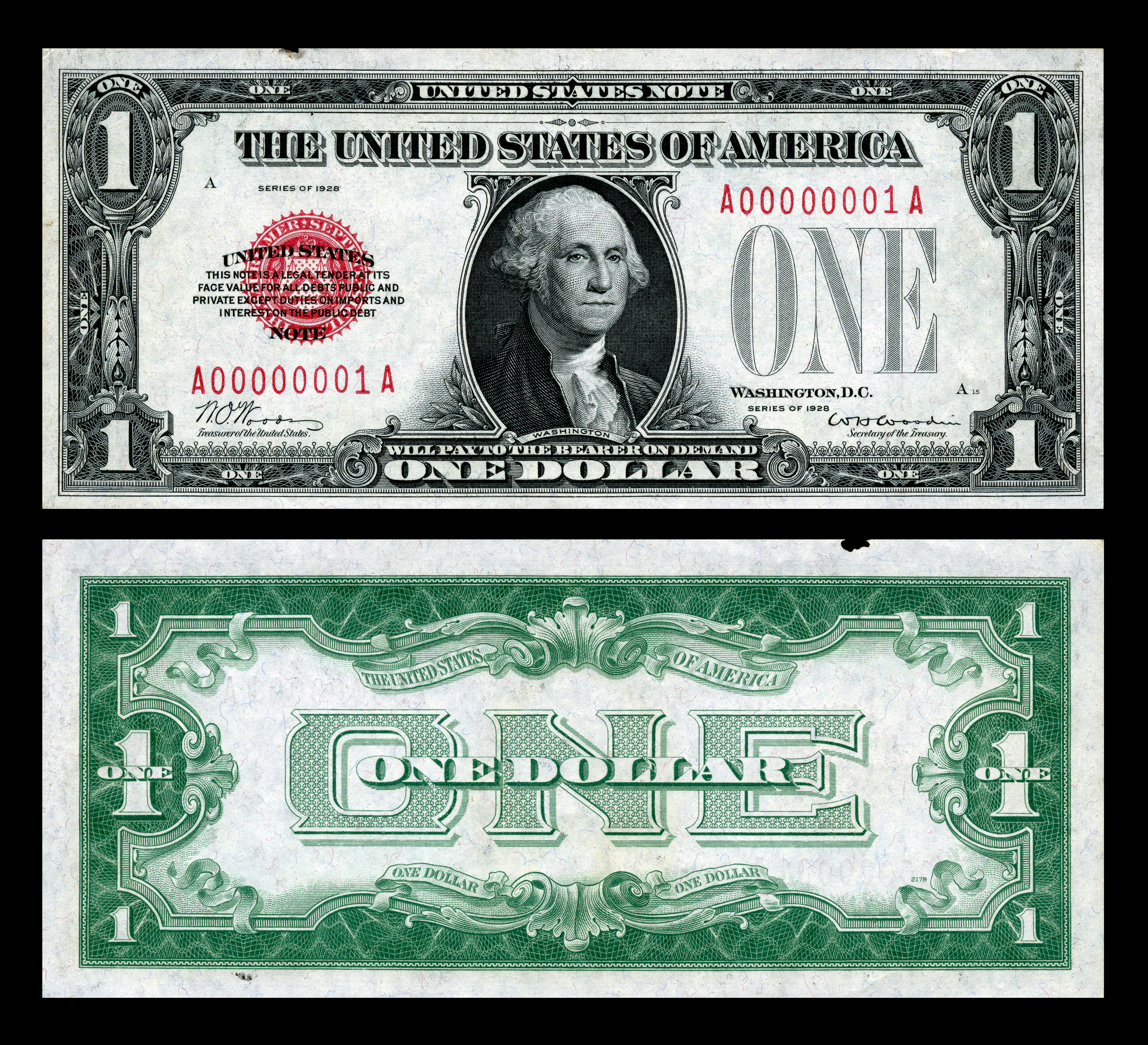
1928 US one-dollar bill

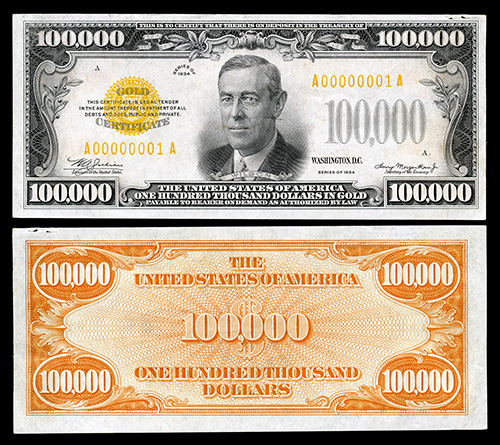
1934 US $100,000 bill

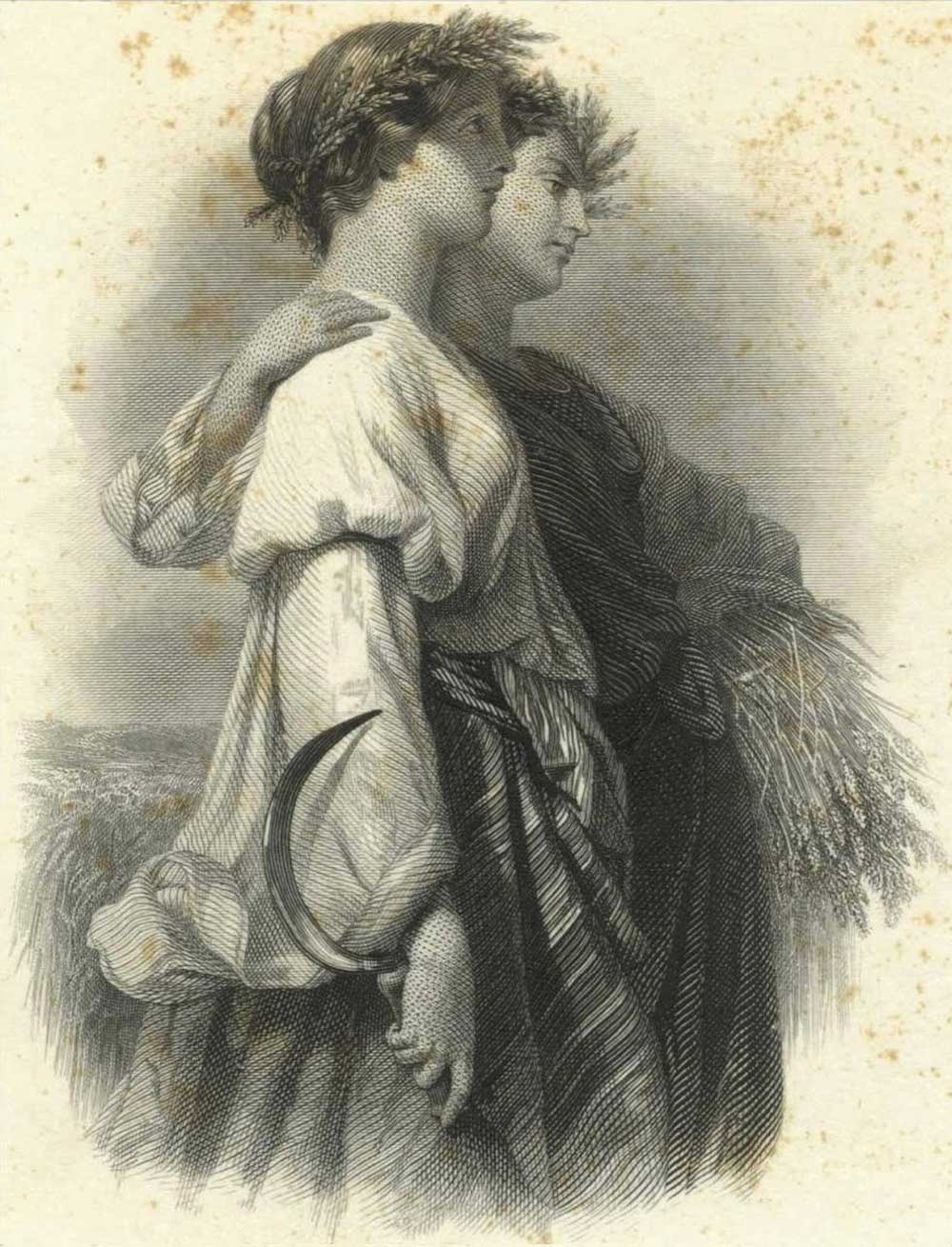
"The Reapers" by G.F.C. Smillie

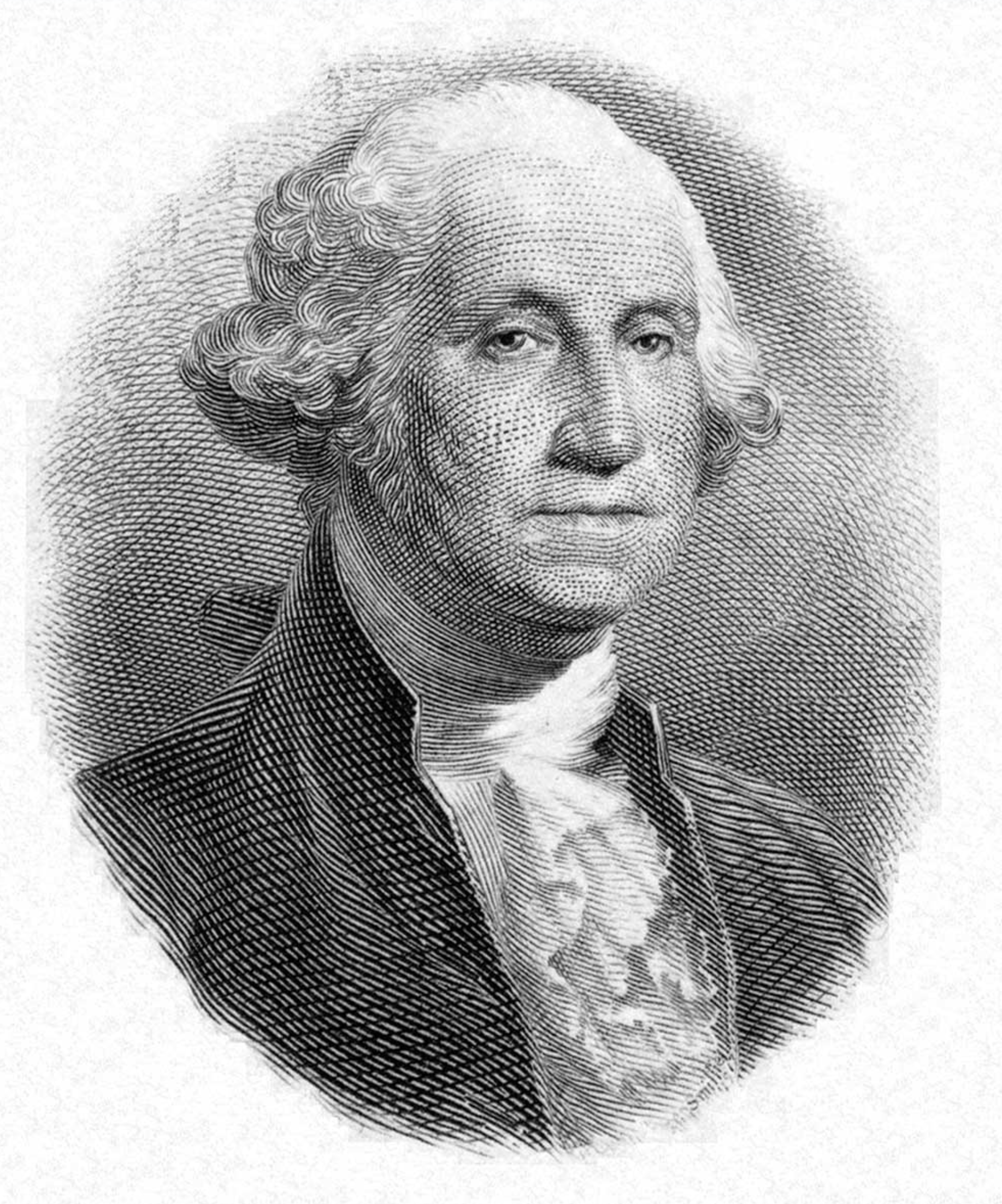
George Washington engraving by G.F.C. Smillie based on a painting by Gilbert Stuart

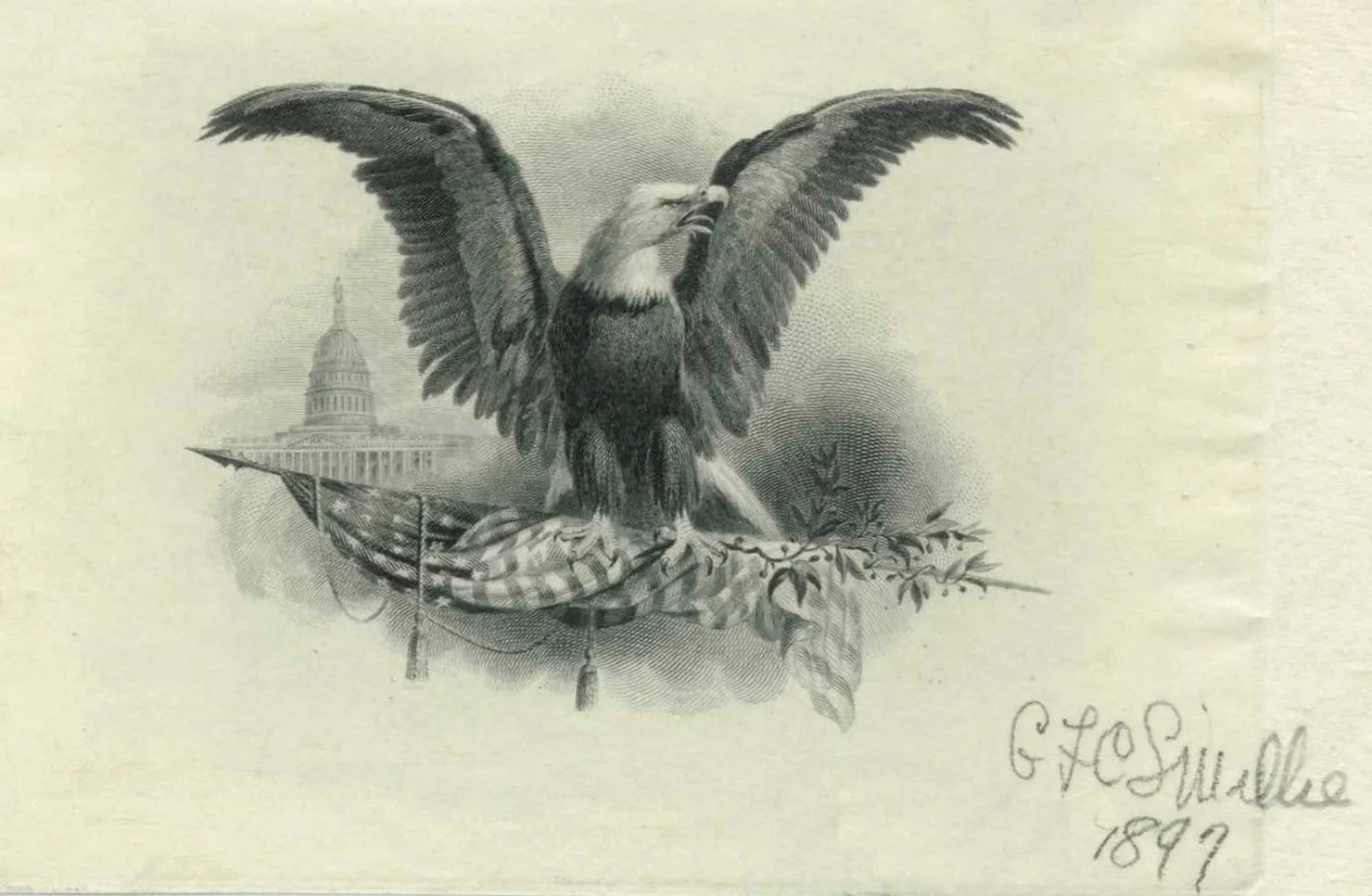
1897 Bald eagle signed by G.F.C. Smillie

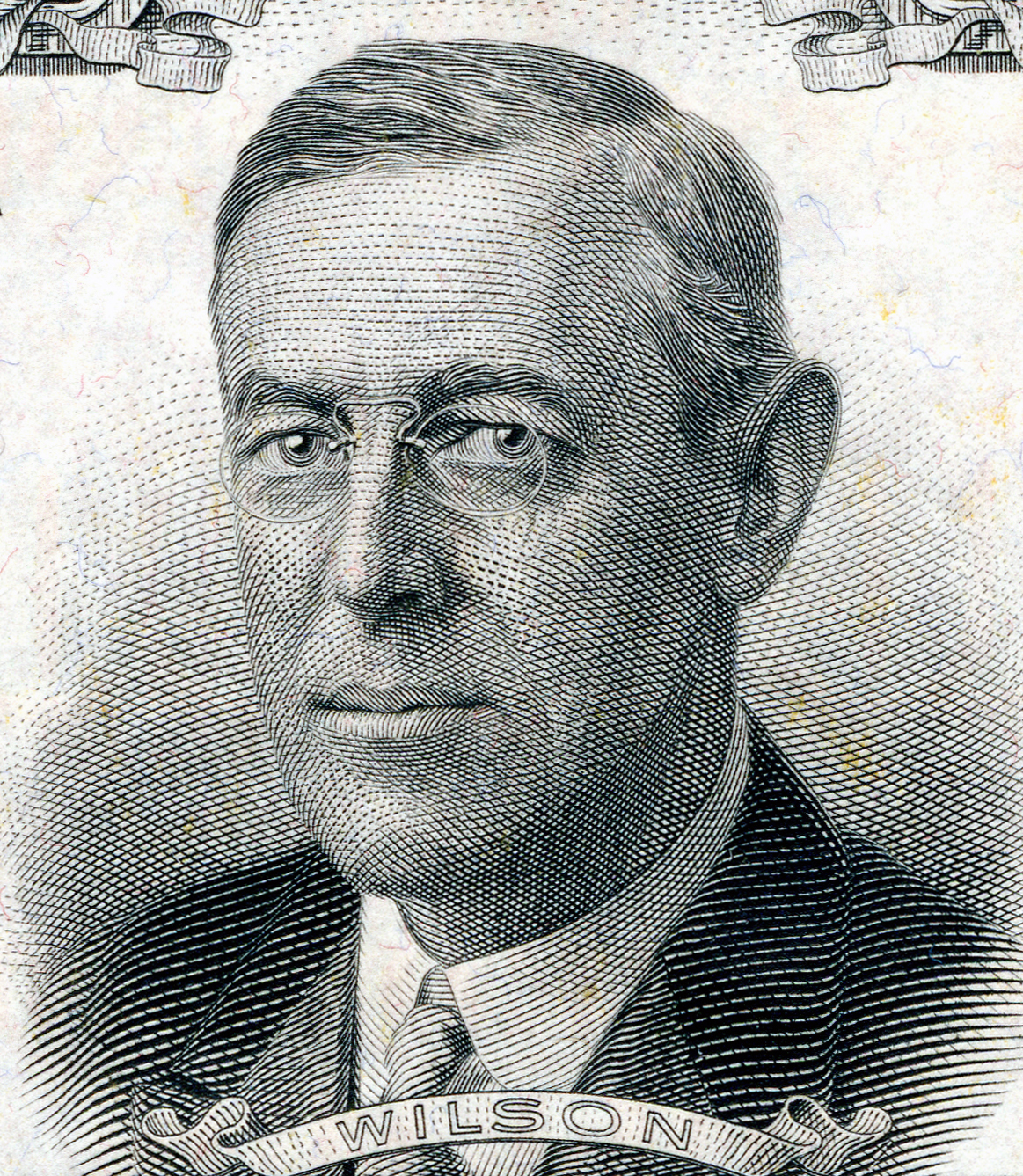
Woodrow Wilson engraving

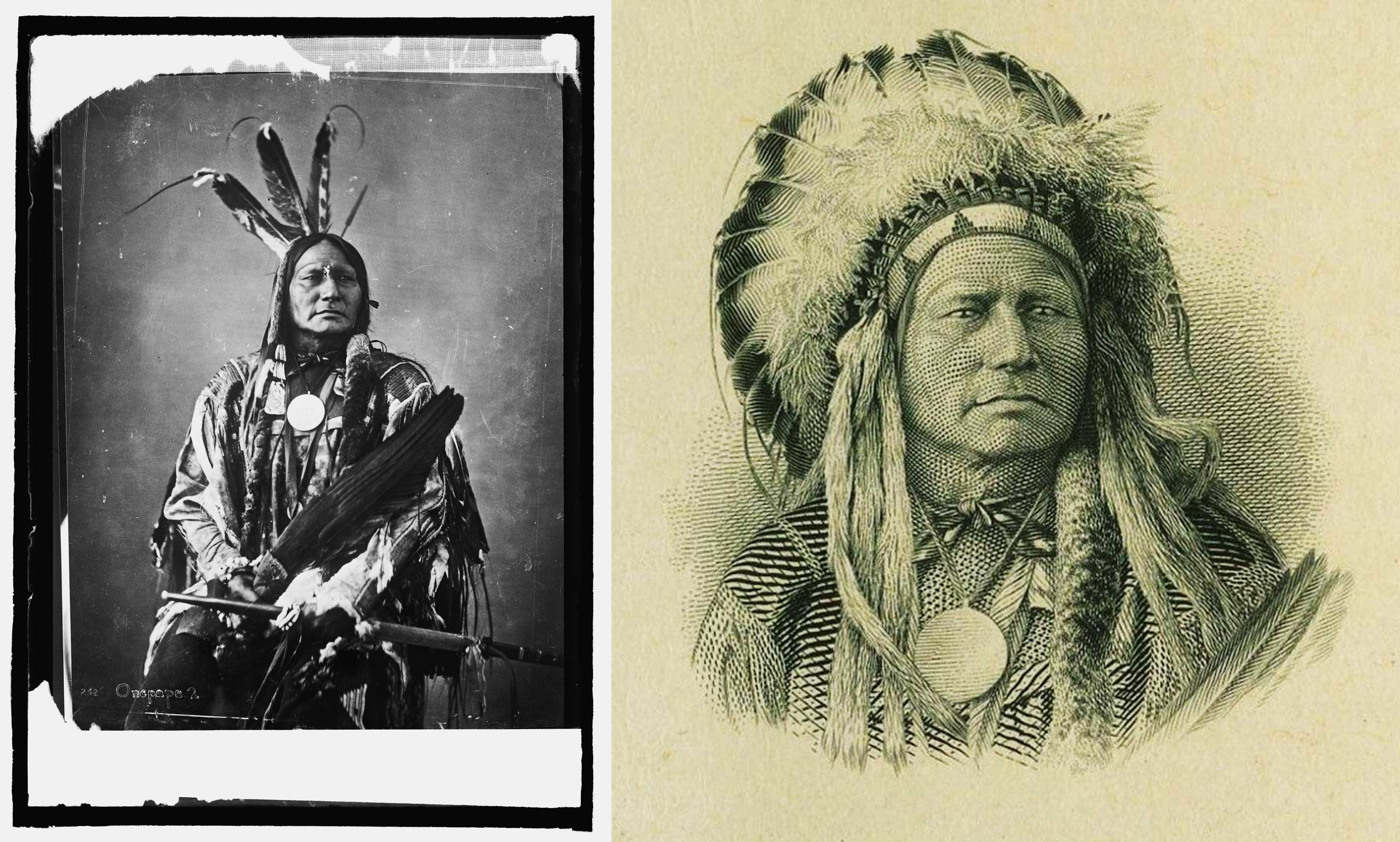
Left: 1872 Photograph of Chief Running Antelope by Alexander Gardner. Right: 1899 G.F.C. Smillie engraving of Running Antelope adorned with a different war bonnet

== See also ==
- Art and engraving on United States banknotes
