= Walter Shirlaw =

American painter

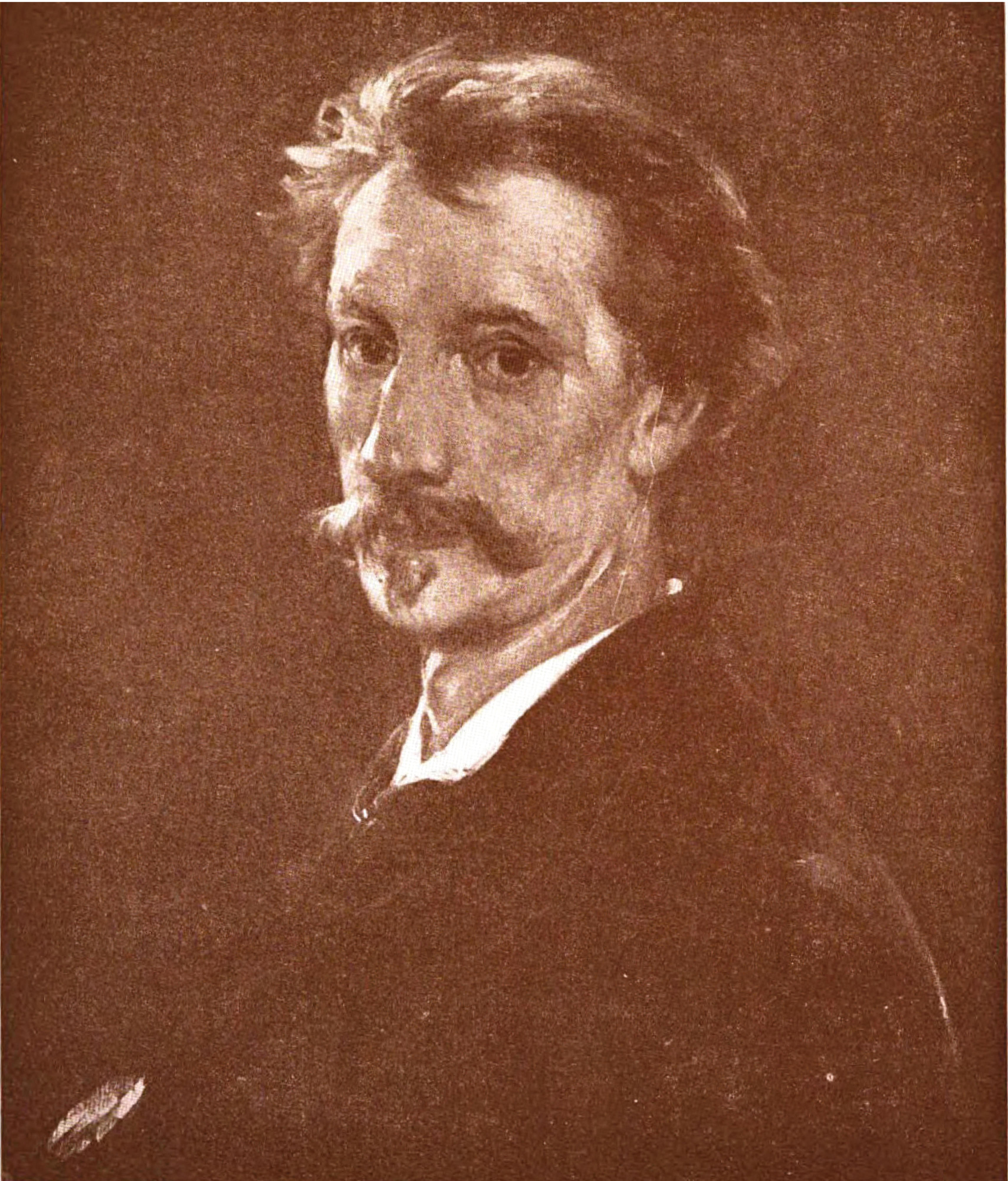
Self-portrait, circa 1900

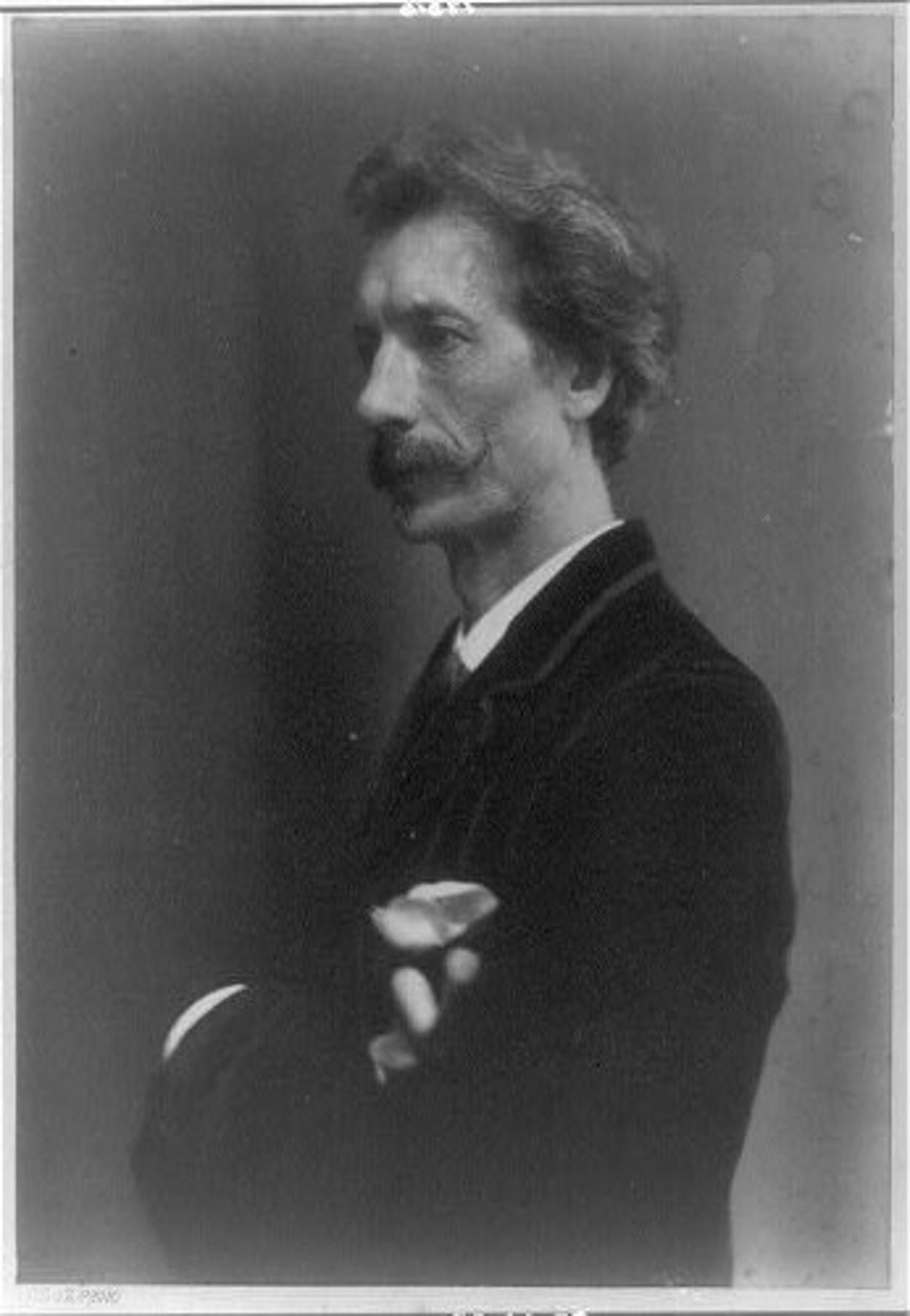
Shirlaw, circa 1900

Walter Shirlaw (August 6, 1838 – December 26, 1909) was a Scottish-American artist.

== Biography ==
Shirlaw was born in Paisley, Scotland, and moved to the United States with his parents in 1840. He worked as a banknote engraver, and his work was first exhibited at the National Academy in New York City in 1861.

He was elected an academician of the Chicago Academy of Design in 1868. Among his pupils there was Frederick Stuart Church. From 1870 to 1877 he studied at the Academy of Fine Arts, Munich, under Johann Leonhard Raab, Alexander von Wagner, Arthur von Ramberg, and Wilhelm Lindenschmidt. His first work of importance was the Toning of the Bell (1874), which was followed by Sheep-shearing in the Bavarian Highlands (1876). The latter, which is probably the best of his works, received honorable mention at the Paris exposition in 1878.

A critical appraisal appeared at about this time by the American writer S.G.W. Benjamin:

There is no uncertainty or weakness in his method of handling color; his lines are clearly and carefully drawn, and he undoubtedly achieves excellent results when he attempts simple compositions. One of Mr. Shirlaw's best known compositions, representing a sheep-shearing in Bavaria, has attracted favorable attention at home and abroad. In compositions which include animals, dogs, and birds, he has been especially happy. His inclinations to delineate the characteristics of bird-life are akin to those of the artists of Japan.

Other notable works from his easel are Good Morning (1878), in the Buffalo Academy; Indian Girl and Very Old (1880); Gossip (1884); and Jealousy (1886), owned by the Academy of Design in New York City. His largest work is the frieze for the dining room in the house of Darius O. Mills in New York City. Shirlaw has also earned an excellent reputation as an illustrator.

One of his paintings was used as the main image on the obverse of the 1896 five-dollar silver certificate known as Electricity as the Dominant Force in the World.

On his return from Europe, he became a professor at the Art Students League of New York, and for several years taught in the composition class. He became an associate of the National Academy in 1887, and an academician the following year. He was one of the founders of the Society of American Artists and its first president. In 1880, he was elected to the Salmagundi Club New York as an Honorary Artist member.

He died in Madrid, Spain on December 26, 1909, and was buried in the British Cemetery there.
