= Indian peace medal =

In colonial America

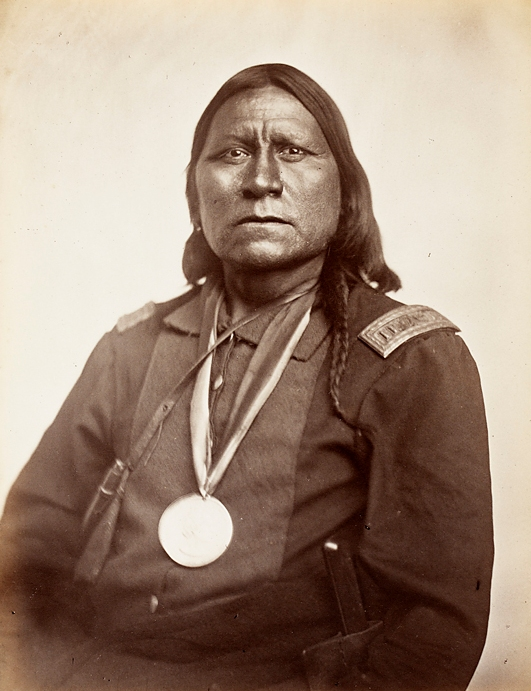
Kiowa Chief Satanta (White Bear) wearing an Indian Peace Medal

Indian peace medals refer to ovular or circular medals awarded to tribal leaders throughout colonial America and early United States history, primarily made of silver or brass and ranging in diameter from about one to six inches. Medals were often perforated and worn suspended around the neck of the recipient. Controversy remains surrounding the use and impact of peace medals in furthering diplomatic relationships between Native Americans and the federal government. Many Indian peace medals today are archived in museums, libraries, and cultural centers.

== Early peace medals ==
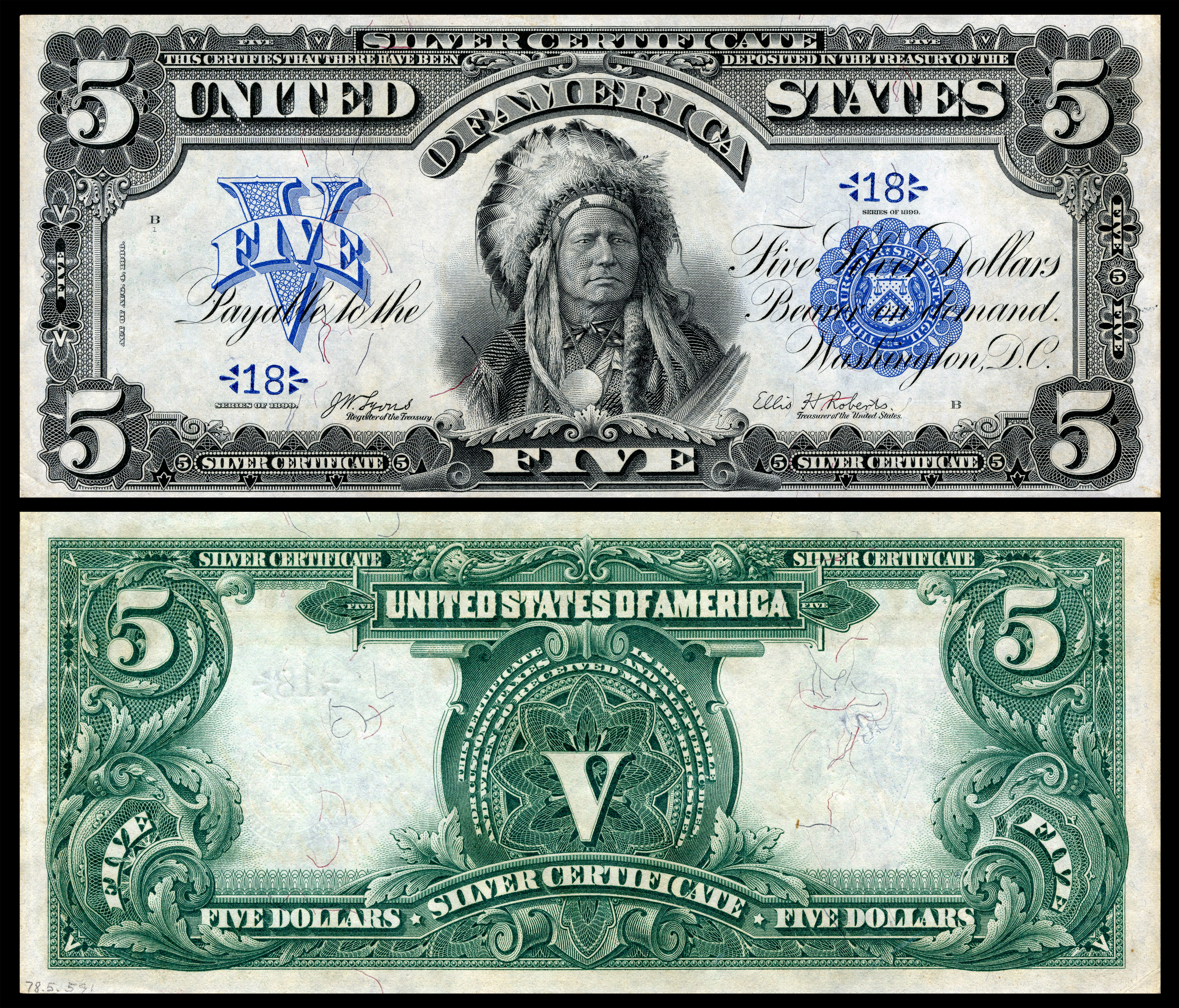
Sioux chief Running Antelope wearing a peace medal on the 1899 United States five-dollar Silver Certificate

During the colonization of America, European nations issued the earliest peace medals to build alliances and negotiate with tribes, dating as far back as the seventeenth century. Medals were given to North American Indians by the British, French, and Spanish in the eighteenth century as sentiments of peace, often in conjunction with national flags and other gifts. A number of silver medals issued under Kings George the First and Second have been excavated in Pennsylvania, the reverse of which show an American Indian figure offering a peace pipe to a Quaker. Medals were also used by European nations to curry favor and secure military alliances with tribes during wartime. For Native Americans, the early medals represented a pledge to supply and trade commodities such as kettles, beads, ornaments, clothes, and weapons. In return, they would supply much of the raw materials that Europeans' overseas trade depended on, including animal hides, furs, and feathers.

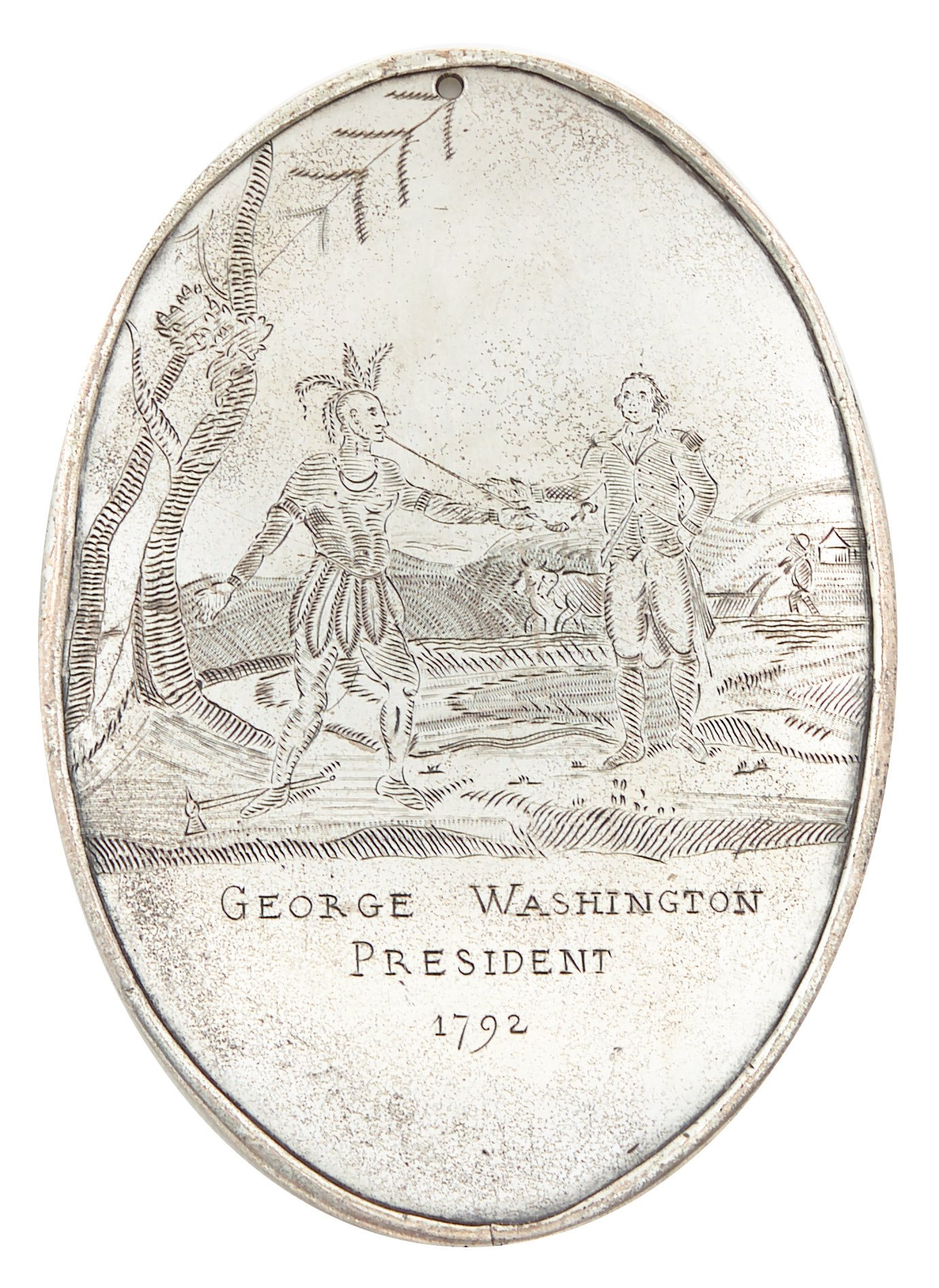
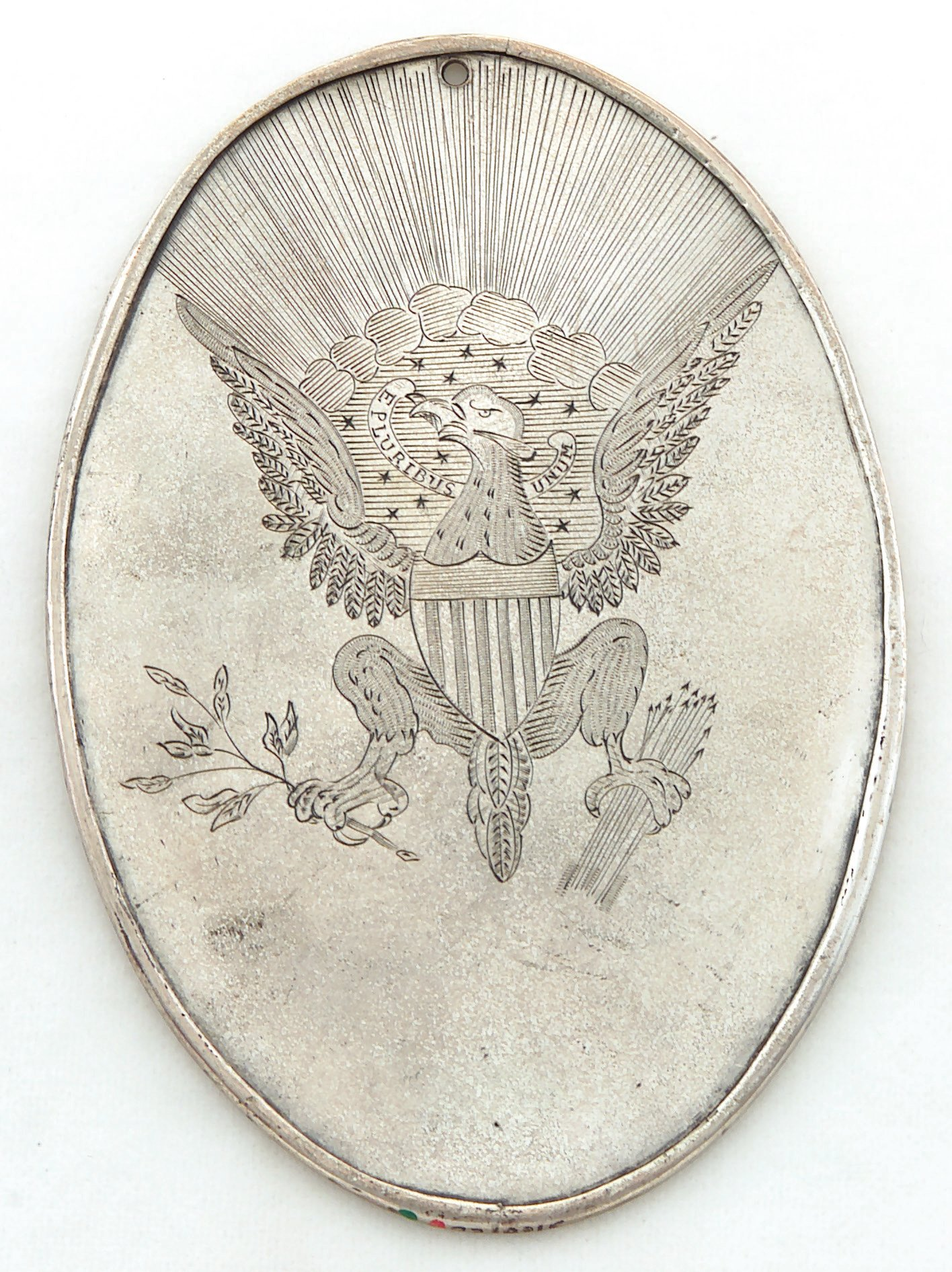
Indian Peace Medal, 1792

Like many European medals, early US medals incorporated Indian figures on their design. What are thought to be the earliest peace medals issued by the US government carry the date 1789, the year of President Washington's inauguration, along with the inscription G. WASHINGTON. PRESIDENT above. The medals show an Indian man wearing a headdress, draped in a blanket. With his right hand he drops his tomahawk while simultaneously receiving a pipe of peace with his left from a figure of Minerva, symbolizing the young America. On the reverse is an eagle with wings extended and thirteen stars above its head, the arms of the United States. US medals issued from 1792 to 1795 are similar in design, but replace the figure of Minerva with George Washington himself.

Medals were an expression of promise: that the United States was invested in furthering peace and diplomacy with the Indians who called this land home. Consequently, the awarding of peace medals often accompanied a formal treaty or negotiation. One of the first known uses of peace medals by the US government dates back to the Treaty of Hopewell, the culmination of Colonel Joseph Martin's mission to the Cherokee nation in 1785. While the medals were issued in accordance with the treaty, the records do not confirm whether or not they were actually distributed to Cherokee leaders.

The ultimate origin of Indian peace medals is not known. Thomas Jefferson himself noted that the usage of the medals is "an ancient custom from time immemorial."

== Presidential medals ==
While early peace medals issued by European nations and the US government frequently incorporate images of European and tribal figures in cultural exchange, peace medals issued during and after the presidency of Thomas Jefferson (1801 – 1809) are almost exclusively presidential medals, displaying the bust of the President in office at the time they were issued. Jefferson medals were the first of their kind, and inspired a long series of presidential medals that continued until the presidency of Benjamin Harrison (1889 – 1893). Presidential medals were minted in mass using engraved dies, replacing the practice of engraving individual medals.

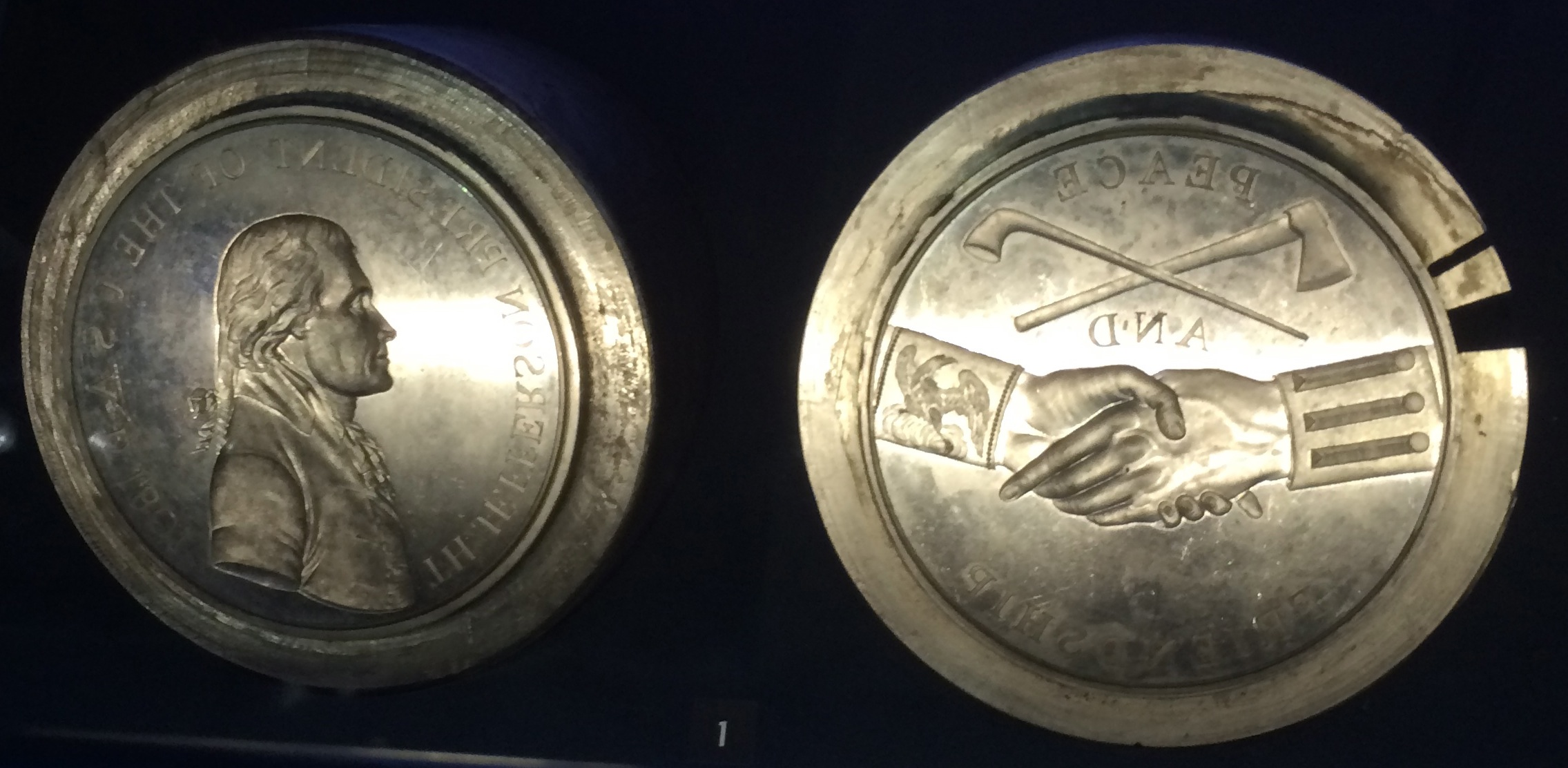
Dies for the Thomas Jefferson Indian Peace Medal

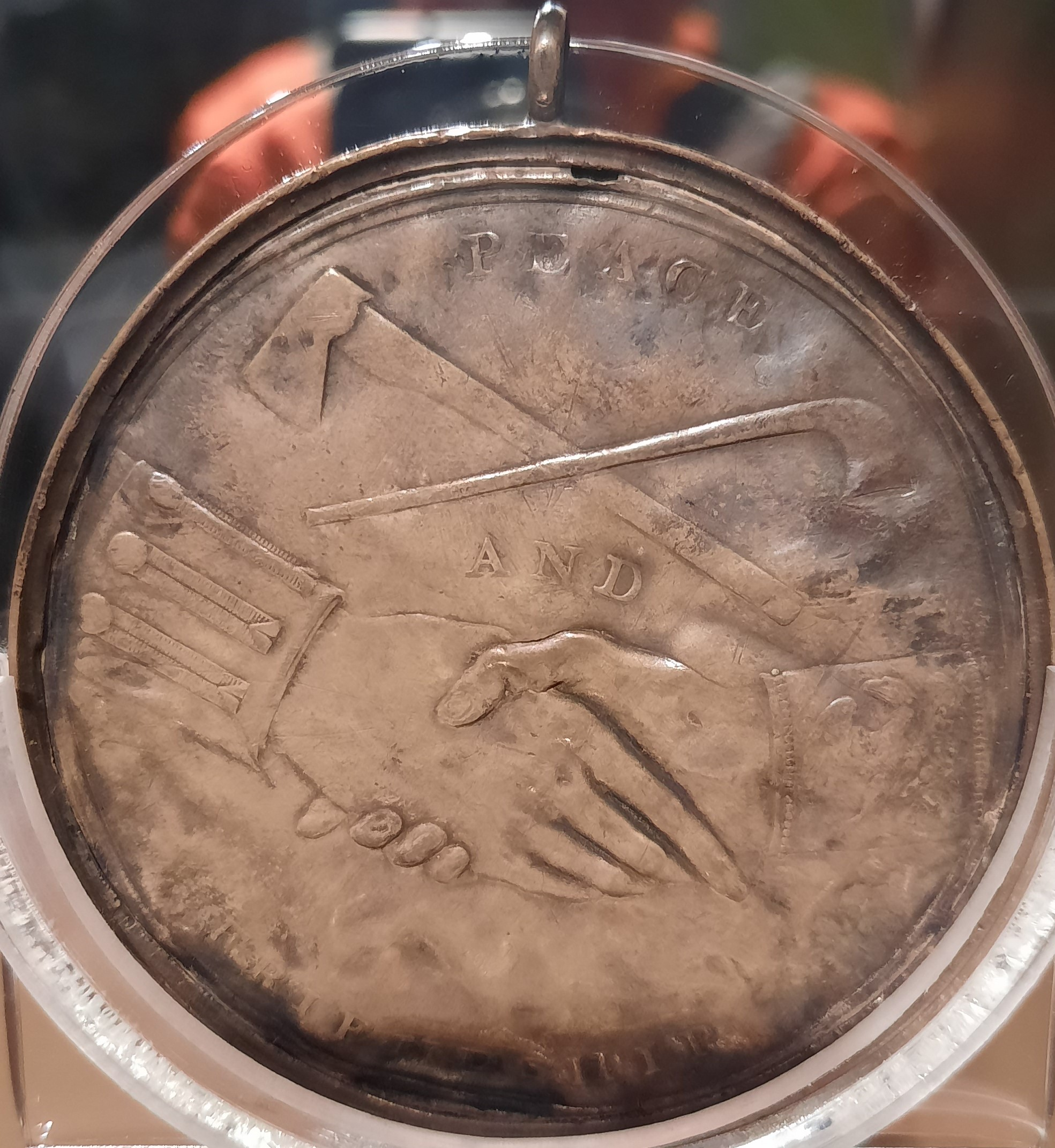
Peace medal at the Idaho State Museum

Jefferson medals, first issued in 1801, display on one side a bust of Thomas Jefferson and on the other, the clasped hands of an Indian and a US soldier. The one to the right bears a metal wristband worn by Native American chiefs, and the one to the left wears the braided cuff of a US military officer. Above the hands is an overlaying tomahawk and pipe, with the legend "Peace and Friendship." Above Jefferson's profile is his name, title, and date he took office, 1801. Jefferson medals consist of two thin silver discs joined by a silver rim and a wooden core. The medals were issued in three standard sizes: 55mm, 75mm, to 105mm in diameter.

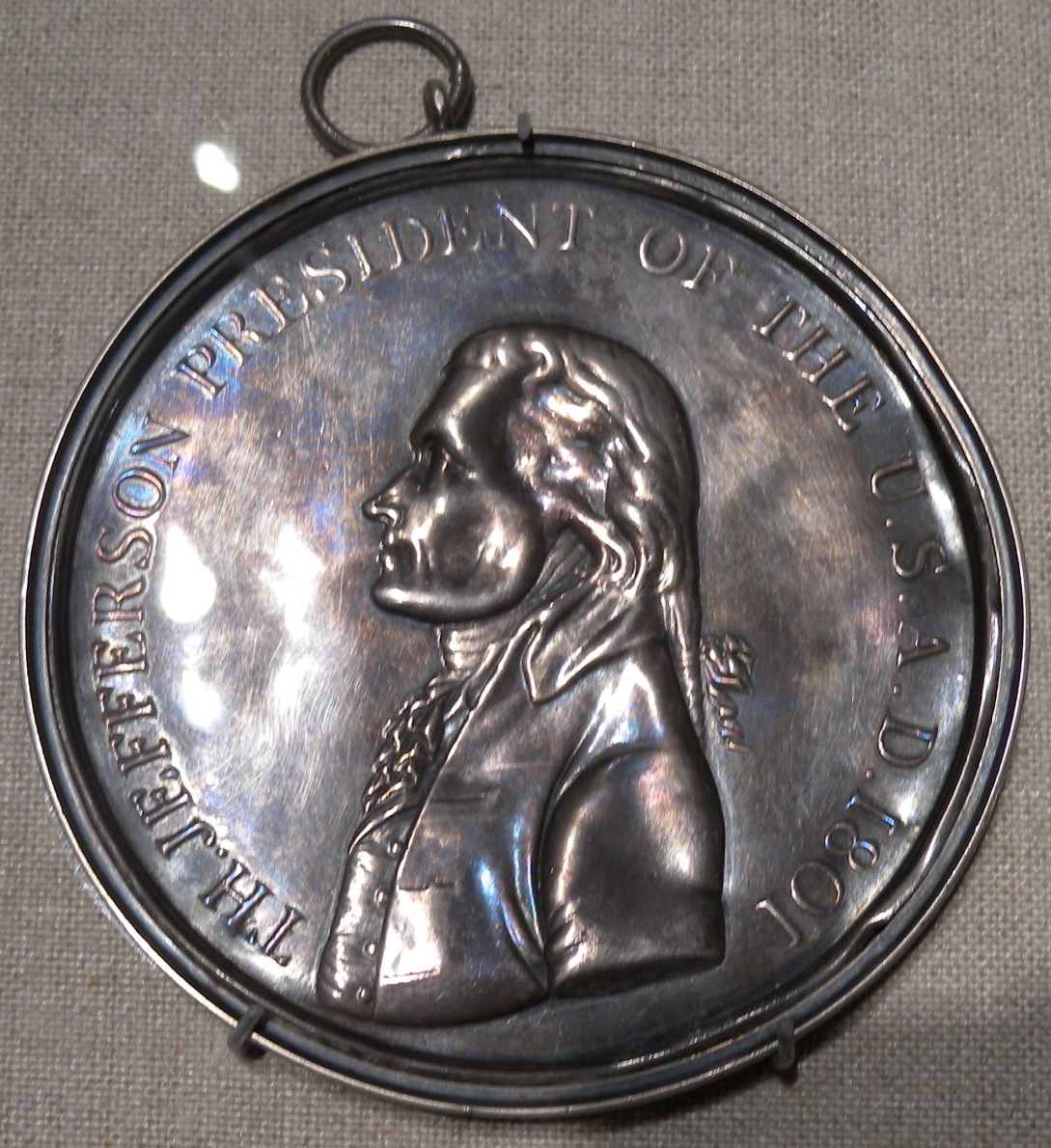
Thomas Jefferson Peace Medal, 1801

=== US government use of presidential medals ===
The distribution of presidential medals accompanied nearly every formal interaction between Native Americans and the US federal government. So established was the practice that Thomas L. McKenney, the Commissioner of Indian Affairs, wrote in 1829, "Without medals, any plan of operating among the Indians, be it what it may, is essentially enfeebled." In a short string of correspondence between the US House of Representatives Committee of Ways and Means and the Department of the Interior in 1865, an appropriation was requested "to provide for the usual distribution of medals to leading and influential chiefs," as the funds provided in 1861 for the same purpose had been exhausted.

The growing popularity of peace medals compelled regulation, and as a result, presidential medals, in comparison to early peace medals given alongside treaties, were increasingly awarded to select individuals. A report issued in 1908 by the Senate Committee on Indian Affairs, for example, recommended the passage of a bill that awards medals to a group of Indian policemen who arrested Sitting Bull, the Sioux chief, near Fort Yates in 1890. Additionally, Meriwether Lewis and William Clark famously distributed about eighty-seven peace medals, many of which were issued under Jefferson, to Indian leaders during their 1803-1806 expedition across the United States as demonstrations of goodwill from the government. In the 1960s, one of the five surviving Jefferson peace medals distributed by Lewis and Clark was found associated with human remains discovered at the Marmes Rockshelter in southeastern Washington state.

In 1829, Lewis Cass, the Governor of Michigan Territory and William Clark, Superintendent of Indian Affairs at St. Louis, issued a proposal to the US government: "Regulations for the Government of the Indian Department." The regulations they set forth were never formally adopted, but do represent the established norms of presidential medal distribution. Among other rules, the medals were to "be given to influential persons only." The largest medals were reserved for the chiefs, while the mid-sized medals would be given to war chiefs. The smallest medals were given to less distinguished chiefs and warriors. The awarding of the peace medals required "proper formalities," and any foreign medal previously worn would be replaced by an American medal if the recipient is deserving of a medal.

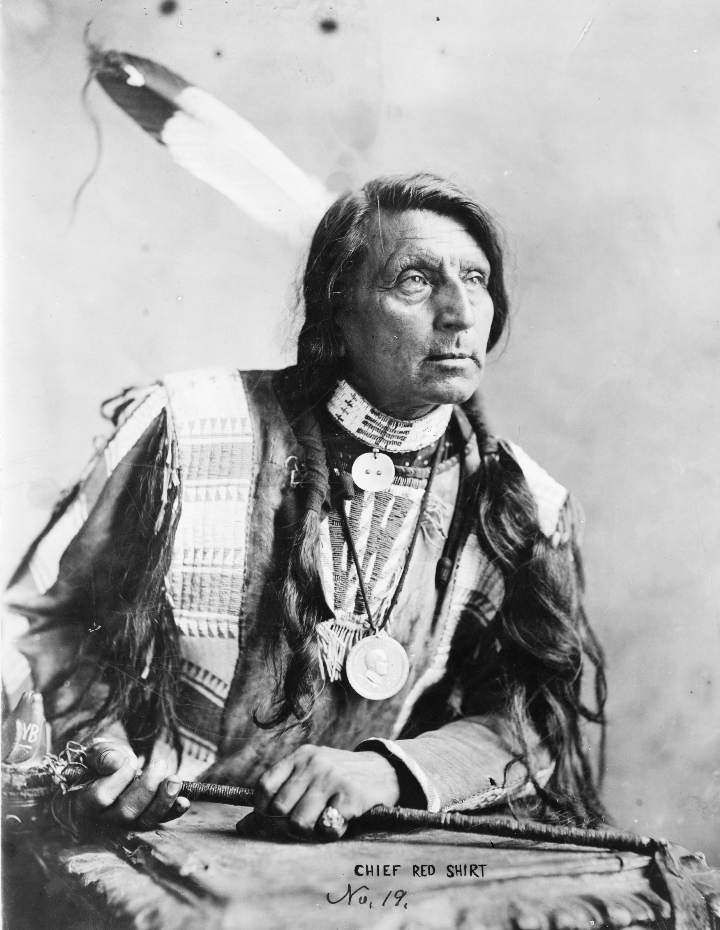
Chief Red Shirt wearing Ulysses S. Grant Medal, 1904

== Native American acceptance of peace medals ==
Great value was prescribed by the peace medals, which were to be buried with the owner or passed down from generation to generation. A considerable amount of portraiture made of Native American figures accentuating the medals worn around their neck serves as a testament to their importance.

Peace medals assumed a role within many Native ethea akin to earlier worn shell gorgets, associating the wearer of the medal with the individual engraved on its surface. The imagery presented on the medals, of both royal and political figures, was understood as a symbol of access into the world of the White man. This world brought with it new trade goods and technologies of Europe and later the United States, notably the rifle. The medals became a physical representation of a spiritual dimension that linked the medal wearer to a source of power, for example, the "Great Father" as President Washington was referred to by medal recipients. The distribution of peace medals both reinforced and furthered a political order within the tribes.

== Criticisms of peace medals ==
Black Hawk, a Sauk chief, represents a number of tribal leaders who were critical of US peace medals and their actual use in advancing relations between the federal government and Native Americans. Black Hawk wrote in his autobiography, "Life of Ma-Ka-Tai-Me-She-Kia-Kiak" (1833), that he never accepts or wears a US peace medal, though he openly wore those given to him by the British, particularly during the War of 1812. Black Hawk writes, "Whilst the British made but few [promises]- we could always rely upon their word." Towards the end of his narrative, Black Hawk reflects on his tour of the federal mint in Philadelphia, the source of the United States' "medals and money." He relates the coins to the US peace medals; both are "very hand-some," and both are unreliable.

Other contemporary criticisms of Indian peace medals demand a reconsideration of what peacekeeping implies and who the kept peace belongs to. In his analysis of the peace medals issued by the United States government between 1789 and 1889, art historian Klaus Lubbers describes the changing composition of the medal engravings, and how those changes reflect the government's increasingly assimilationist Indian policy. In comparison to the first peace medals that display full Indian figures and little in the background, Lubbers notes that subsequent peace medals incorporate typical agricultural backdrops with a house, oxen, and farm land. Over time, the Indian figures take up less space in the compositions, which Lubbers attributes to a receding equality in rank between the White man and the Indian. The issuing of the Rutherford B. Hayes medal in 1877 coincided with the final efforts endorsed by the Indian Removal Act, and unsurprising to Lubbers, the Hayes medal affords little space to the Native American figure. Its backdrop displays the world of the White man, who stands in the center of the composition leaning on an ax with a chopped tree at his feet. Behind the figures appears a log cabin, and there sits a woman and infant while a man plows.

== Indian peace medals today ==
By the 1840s, Indian peace medals had come to be known as a "presidential series" for which there was growing interest. The federal mint in Philadelphia started collecting dies for the previously issued medals. This began the practice of striking bronze replicas of medals for presentation to government officials or historical societies. Production of the bronze medals began in 1842 with the Jefferson medal. The dies of the Washington and John Adams medals were missing during initial production, however. The John Adams die was not collected until 1878, and the George Washington die was ultimately reproduced in 1903, completing the series.

The American Numismatic Society in New York has the most extensive collection of Indian peace medals, containing an example of nearly every medal issued. The Smithsonian Institution in Washington, D.C. has a similarly large collection. Significant medal collections may be found in the Denver Museum of Nature and Science, the Gilcrease Institute of American History and Art, the Henry Ford Museum, and the Massachusetts Historical Society. Other locations, including the Arizona Pioneer's Historical Society, Boston Museum of Fine Arts, Brooklyn Museum, and the Chicago Historical Society, have smaller collections. A number of peace medals also belong to private collectors.
