= Frederick Stuart Church =

American artist (1842–1923)

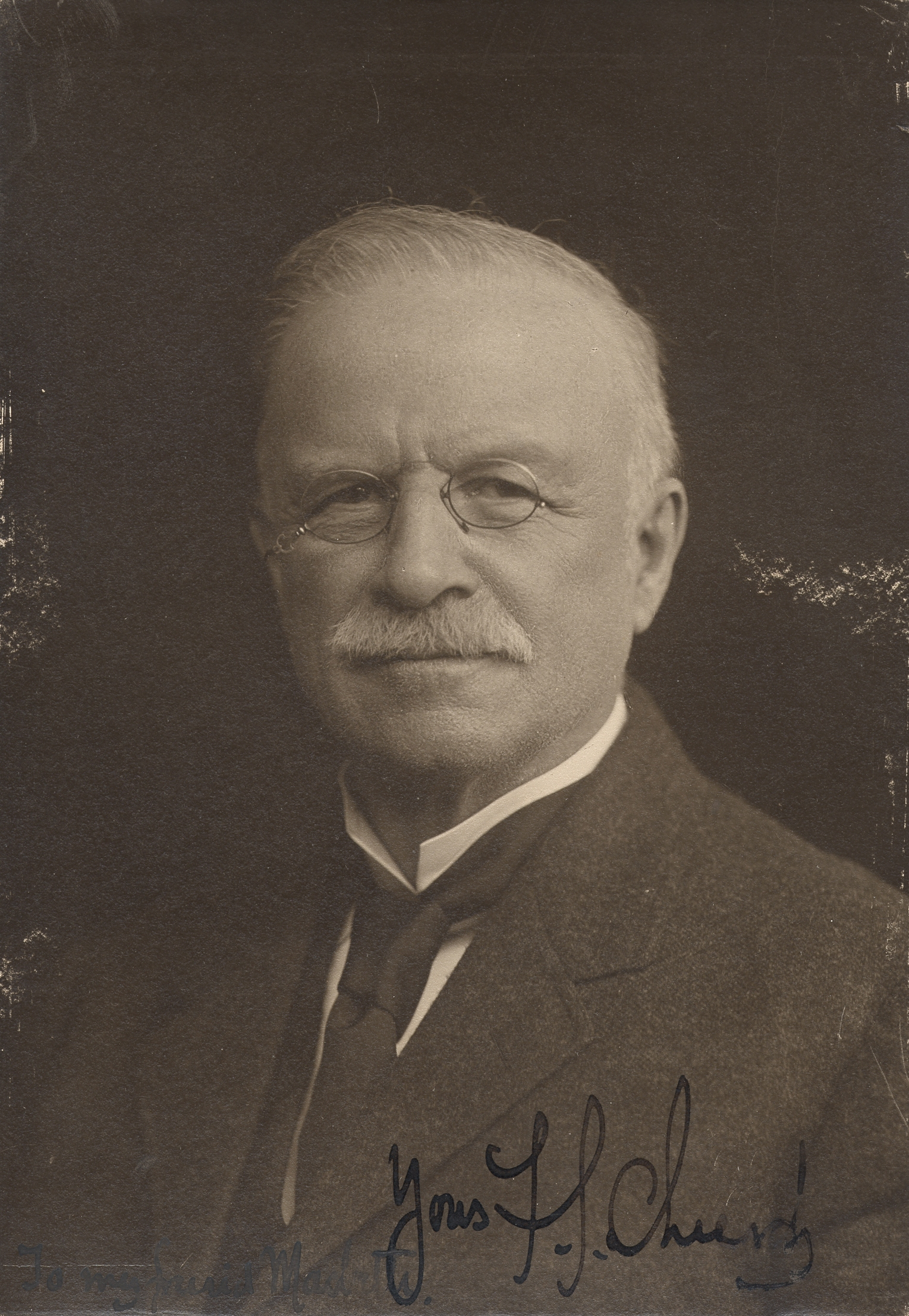
- Born: 1842
- Died: 1924 (aged 81–82)

Frederick Stuart Church (December 1, 1842 – February 18, 1923) was an American artist, working mainly as an illustrator and especially known for his (often allegorical) depiction of animals.

== Biography ==
He was born in Grand Rapids, Michigan. His father was an important figure in politics as well as a well-known lawyer. At the age of 13 he left school and took a job at the then newly established American Express Company in Chicago, with his parents intending him to have a business career. He served in the Union Army during the Civil War. After his discharge he returned to Chicago, having decided to devote his life to art, and started studying drawing under Walter Shirlaw at the city's Academy of Design.

In 1870 he took the decision to continue his studies in New York City, which became his home for the rest of his life. He enrolled at the National Academy of Design, where he was taught by Lemuel Wilmarth. He joined the Art Students League, headed by his old teacher Walter Shirlaw, in which he remained involved for the rest of his life.

Unlike many other Americans of his time who felt themselves to be living in a cultural backwater, Church - while he did think that an artist needed to be formally taught - saw no need to study art in Europe and in fact only crossed the Atlantic late in his life. He often expressed outspoken pride in original American art and declaring that "foreign art" had "little to teach Americans." This might be a reflection of the attitudes taken by the strong nativist movements active during his young age, among other places in Chicago when he lived there.

By the middle of the 1870s he was already gaining a name as a gifted illustrator. Among the many magazines and periodicals which eventually took up his works were the various Harper's publications (Harper's Bazaar, Harper's Weekly, and Harper's Young People), as well as Frank Leslie's Weekly, Century Magazine and the Ladies' Home Journal. In 1883, Church was elected into the National Academy of Design as an Associate Academician, and became a full Academician in 1885.

He also worked for various commercial companies, for example illustrating the almanac of the Elgin Watch Company and producing an 1881 Christmas Card for Louis Prang & Company.

His career was helped along by several devoted patrons, among them William T. Evans, John Gellatly, the banker Grant B. Schley, and the railroad-car manufacturer Charles Lang Freer, the founder of Washington, D.C.'s Freer Gallery.

Church became especially known for his fondness of depicting animals, both in their natural state and in anthropomorphic "allegorical compositions" - having both the patience and empathy needed to gain the confidence of his animal "models" and a through understanding of animal anatomy, as well as of animal facial expressions and the moods and feelings they conveyed.

His work on Aesop's Fables, including an illustration of the human and animal protagonists of each fable plus an elaborate cover for the whole, is considered among the best of his works.

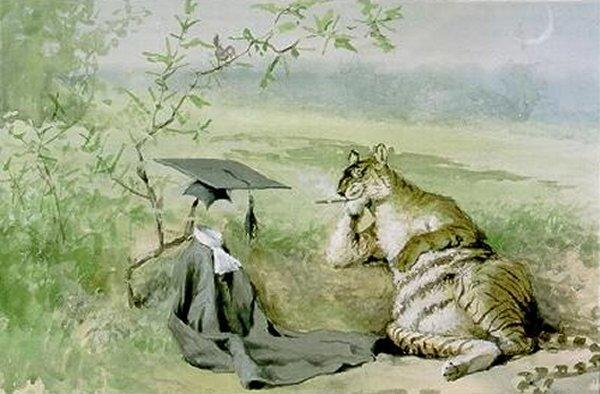
Tiger having eaten professor, 1905.

Though living in the big city, he liked to make painting expeditions to the countryside. In one period, when living on a farm and teaching the owner's two young daughters to draw, he "could often be found handling and posing the tame frogs from the spring house, carrying turtles up from the pond and arranging chickens and other farmyard poultry for Thanksgiving sketches". The aforementioned banker Grant B. Schley eventually provided Church with a specially-built studio at Schley's estate "Froh Helm", located at Far Hills, New Jersey.

While in the city, Church often visited Barnum and Bailey's premises as well as the Central Park Zoo, to study and make endless sketches of the animals held there. On such occasions he was described as "playing catch with an elephant, watching the dance of a distressed ostrich and spending hours observing seahorses in an aquarium," so as "to effectively capture the character of each creature."

Aside from his numerous animal drawings, Church dealt with many other themes, usually in a "cheerful and fanciful" mood, such as a "Holiday Series" including "A Halloween illustration of dainty witches crouched by a cauldron under a smoke-filled sky, a Thanksgiving image of a young girl driving turkeys, and a depiction of Christmas morning on the bottom of the sea as little mermaids open their gifts and polar bears dance arm-in-arm with a lovely young woman."

== The 2003 Exhibition ==
Some of Church's works are kept in the Permanent Collection of the Fulton Decorative Arts Gallery at the Washington County Museum of Fine Arts in Hagerstown, Maryland. Others are at the collection of Dale and Rosie Horst of Newton, Kansas, which lent them to the Fulton Gallery in 2003, for an extensive exhibition including both Church's original drawings and the magazines and periodicals in which they appeared.

The Resource Library Magazine, describing the exhibition, noted the following items:

- Opening of the Season at the North Pole (originally published Harper's Weekly, December 1875) depicts "polar bears on ice skates,(...) amiable, fun-loving animals always ready to play games or join in adventures".
- Flapjacks (Harper's Weekly, December 1892) - "A small bear holding a griddle while a young lady prepares an eagerly anticipated breakfast for a crowd of adult bears" was used in the December 1892 issue of the same publication.
- A New Year's Greeting (Harper's Young People, January 1, 1889) -"A large stork clutching a basket in his beak while a chubby round baby smiles from inside".
- Christmas Fun (Harper's Weekly, December 16, 1893) - "A young woman being assisted by a bear in putting on her ice skates".
- Santa's Cake Walk (Harper's Bazaar, December 17, 1898) - "A scene in which Santa directs a polar bear band seated in his reindeer-driven sleigh while dozens of bears dance with top hats, canes and fans".
- Christmas Morning: One Hundred Fathoms Deep (Harper's Young People, December 11, 1888).
- "Cold Sauce with the Christmas Pudding" - an 1894 painting made for Century Magazine, the original later donated to the Fulton gallery by Robert F. Skutch of Baltimore.
- The Snow Witch's Daughter (Harper's Bazaar, December 23, 1882)
