= 1899 United States five-dollar Silver Certificate =

United States five-dollar Silver Certificate

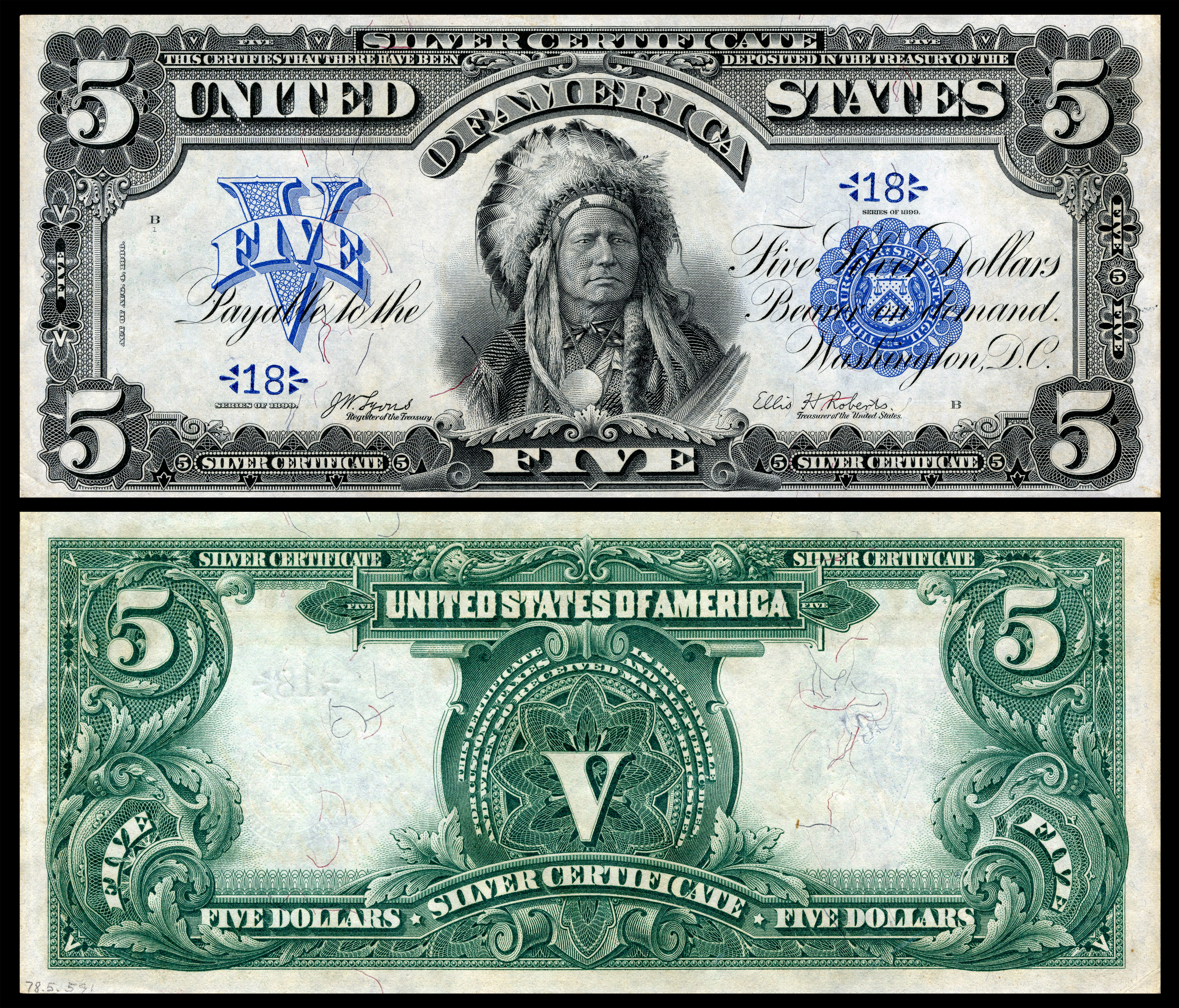
US $5 1899 featuring Chief Running Antelope

The 1899 United States five-dollar Silver Certificate is known as the Indian Chief Note. The note features Lakota chief Running Antelope wearing an incorrect war bonnet. It is the only US federal paper currency featuring a named Native American.

== Background ==
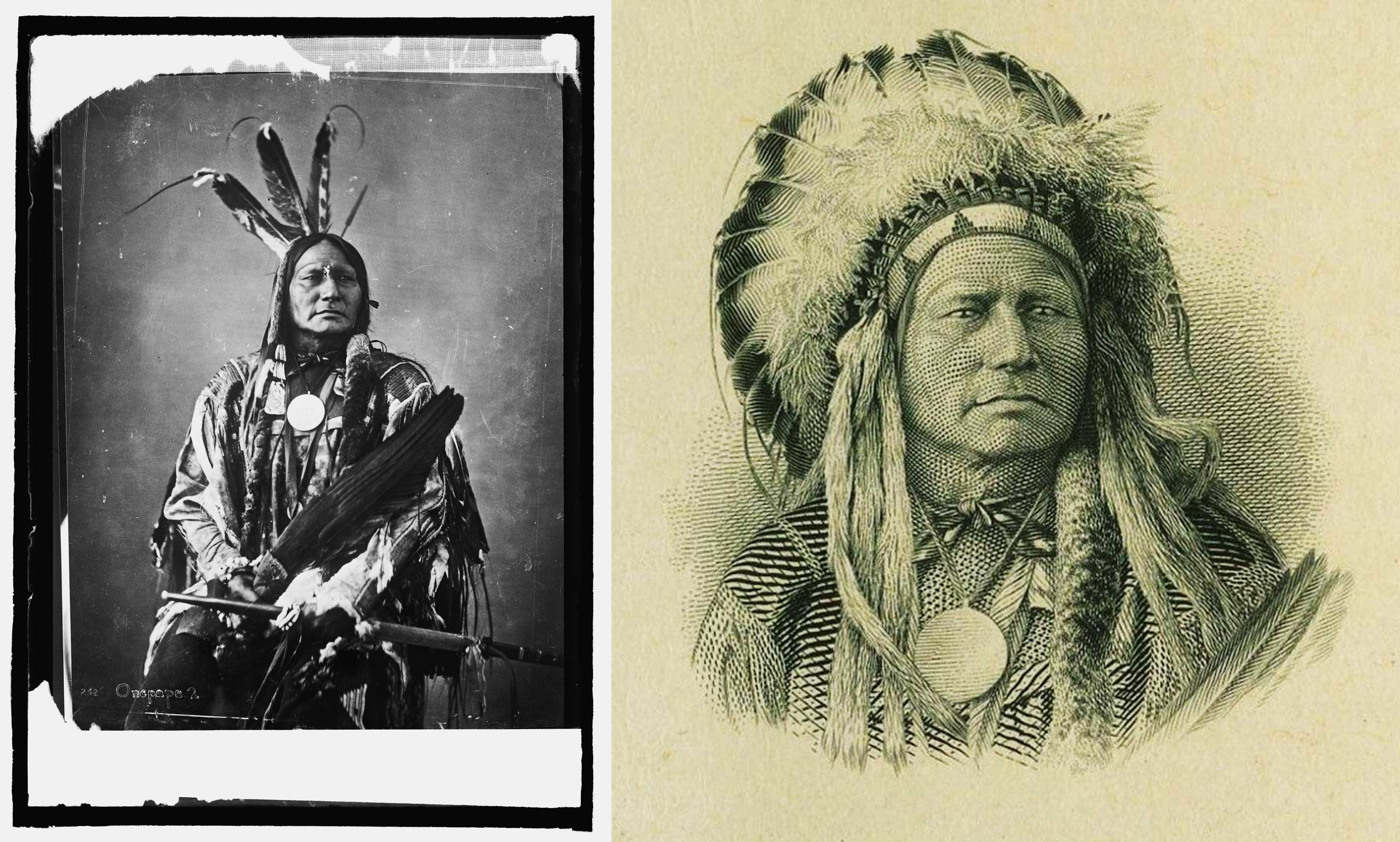
Left: 1872 Photograph of Chief Running Antelope by Alexander Gardner. Right: 1899 G.F.C. Smillie engraving of Running Antelope adorned with a different war bonnet

The Series of 1899 United States five-dollar Silver Certificate was the fourth issue of "silver certificates". The other denominations in the series were the $1 and $10. The note featured a Native American portrait in the center of the obverse. Unnamed Native Americans are pictured on some obsolete US banknotes but the 1899 five-dollar note is the only US federal currency featuring a named Native American's portrait. In the year 2000, the United States produced a one-dollar coin with a depiction of another named Native American: Sacagawea. The engraving for the Native American on the 1899 United States five-dollar Silver was made from an 1872 image of Lakota Chief Tatoka-Inyanka (Running Antelope) captured by photographer Alexander Gardner. The chief is seen wearing an Indian peace medal featuring US President Andrew Johnson. He had a three feather headdress and his hair is adorned with fur. He is seated and he holds a wing-fan and a peace pipe.

== History ==
G.F.C. Smillie of the U.S. Bureau of Engraving and Printing (BEP) engraved the portrait of Running Antelope of the Hunkpapa Lakota which is found on the large size 1899 five-dollar Silver Certificate. During the photoshoot Running Antelope wore his three-feathered headdress but when engraving for the note, his headdress did not fit in the space of the 1899 five-dollar Silver Certificate. Smillie found an image of a feathered-War bonnet that was likely Pawnee and he used it in the engraving. Because of the incorrect headdress, the engraved portrait was controversial. The Lakota were enemies of the Pawnee so the depiction of a Lakota chief with his enemies’ war bonnet became a controversy. Because of the depiction of a Native American on the obverse, collectors refer to the note as the "Indian Chief Note".

The BEP printed 566,054,000 of the 1899 five-dollar bill. Less than 12,000 are available for currency collectors.
