= Running Antelope =

Hunkpapa chief

- Tȟatȟóka Íŋyaŋke
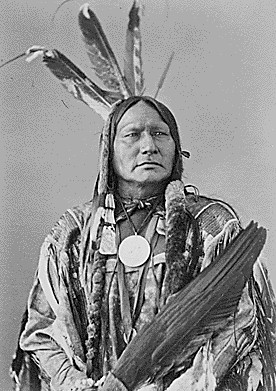
- Running Antelope

Hunkpapa leader

Personal details
- Born: c. 1821 Grand River, South Dakota
- Died: 1896 or 1897 (aged 74–76)
- Resting place: Long Hill Cemetery, Little Eagle South Dakota

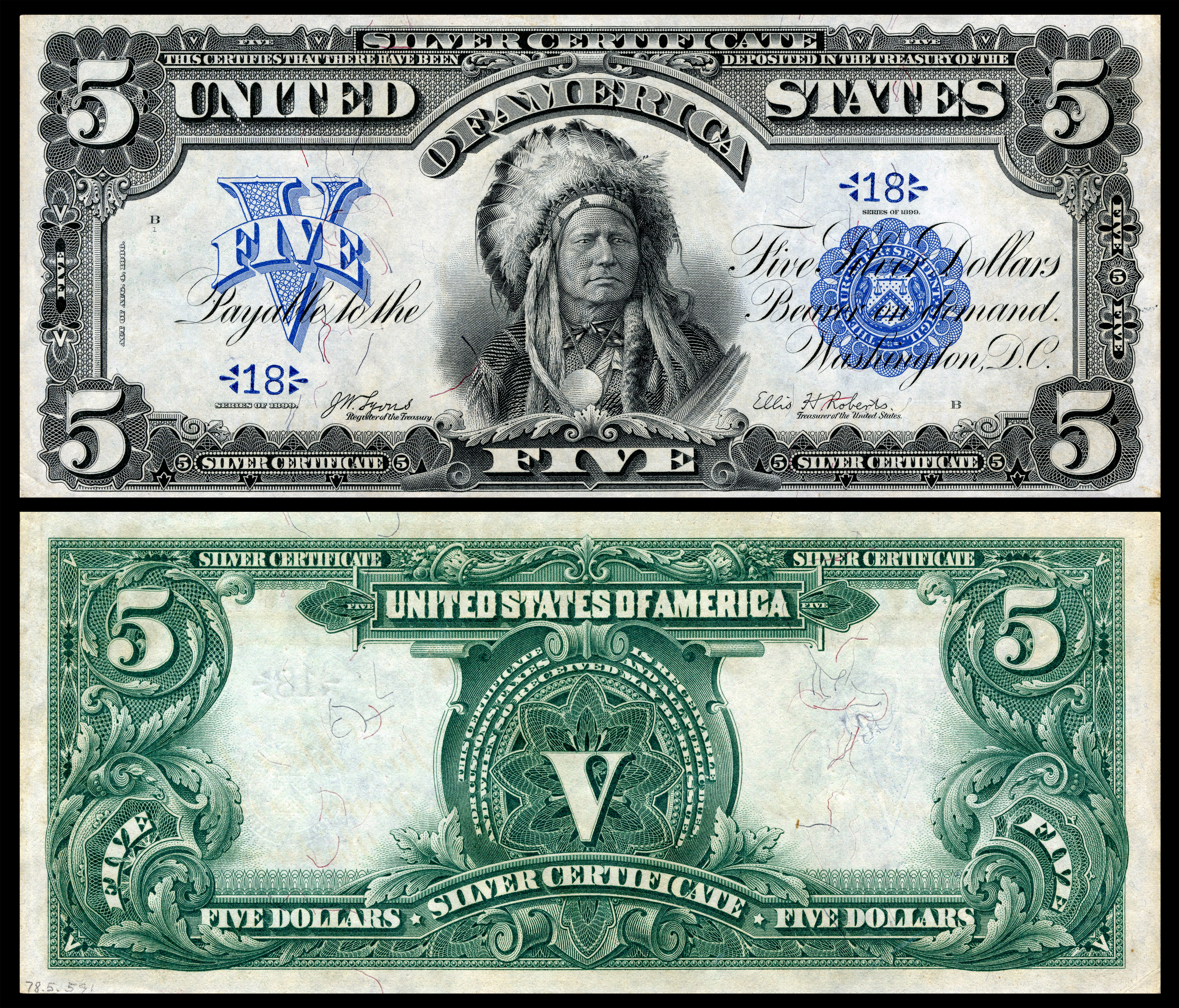
1899 United States five-dollar Silver Certificate with an image of Running Antelope wearing an Indian peace medal depicting President Andrew Johnson

Running Antelope (Lakota: Tȟatȟóka Íŋyaŋke; c. 1821 – 1896 or 1897) was a Hunkpapa Lakota leader, orator, and diplomat. He was one of four Hunkpapa "shirt-wearers", acting as a close advisor to Sitting Bull during the Plains Indian Wars. He believed that compromise with white Americans was in his people's best interest, a position that eventually distanced him from Sitting Bull.

He is the only Native American depicted on United States paper currency. His portrait appears on the Series 1899 five-dollar Silver Certificate, where he is depicted wearing what appears to be a Pawnee war bonnet. The original photo was doctored to replace his original three-feathered war bonnet, likely because it was deemed too tall for the portrait.

== Early life ==
When Running Antelope was born near the Grand River, presently South Dakota, in 1821, few White men were in the area. Consequently, he grew up in the old traditions of his people. He learned to ride and hunt, and later went on horse-stealing expeditions and war parties and joined the secret societies. By the time he reached manhood, white people were more numerous, and the Native Americans were forced to adapt to the new conditions. Many Sioux took up arms and became strong in warfare; the Hunkpapas, one of the smaller bands of the Tetons, became one of the strongest. Running Antelope, however, was one of the first Hunkpapas to reject the warpath and become a friend of White people. Running Antelope, in his earlier years, was closely allied with Sitting Bull, who was eleven years his junior. Running Antelope, a band chief, was prominent among the Lakota.

== Hunkpapa leader ==
In 1851, Running Antelope was elected one of four "shirt wearers" of the Húŋkpapȟa. A shirt wearer served to intercede between the council and the headmen and akíčhita who carried out tribal policy and decisions. He was a brave warrior and accomplished diplomat. A great council with the Sioux was called at Fort Laramie and Fort Rice in 1868. Running Antelope signed the Treaty of 1868 at Fort Rice. It was often said that Running Antelope was the greatest orator of the Sioux Nation. He attended the Fort Laramie, Fort Rice and Fort Peck treaty councils. Under the influence of James McLaughlin, he became a dominant leader of the reservation Hunkpapa people at the Grand River Agency. He was enrolled in 1868 at Grand River Agency, later part of Standing Rock Reservation in North and South Dakota. After the allotment period. Running Antelope established a settlement of about sixty families in the Grand River valley and opened a store. In his later years, he regretted signing the 1868 Treaty and longed for the time when the Lakota were free, and realigned with Sitting Bull. Late in 1880, the followers of Sitting Bull began to return from exile in Canada and in the spring of 1881, Running Antelope was enlisted as a scout in the army to go to Fort Buford to escort Gall and his followers to Standing Rock.

== Last buffalo hunt ==
He was chosen to lead the last great Sioux buffalo hunt in June 1882. A large herd was sighted about a hundred miles west of Fort Yates, and a hunting party of 2,000 men, women and children left the fort on June 10. The next morning the herd numbering approximately 50,000 buffalo was sighted and the hunt was on. About 2,000 were killed the first day, and the camp moved up to the scene of the hunt and the butchering began. The next day another 3,000 were killed and the camp settled in near a creek to jerk the meat and prepare pemmican. As usual when meat was plentiful, the labors of the Indian camp were lightened by feasting.

== Later life and death ==
On the 1885 Standing Rock ration list, he had ten lodges and 42 people in his care. Wahacanka Sapa (Black Shield); Mato Luta (Red Bear); Edwin Phelps Aknan Iyanke (Runs on It); Mato Hotanka (Loud Voice Bear); Rlaya Wakua (Chase Rattling); Winkta Yuza (Married to Hermaphrodite); Cante Witko (Fool Heart); Pte San Waste Win (Pretty Grey Cow); Tatanka He Ksa (Broken Horn Bull). He died between June 30, 1896, and June 30, 1897. He is buried at the Long Hill Cemetery east of Little Eagle, South Dakota.

Running Antelope was pictured on the 1899 United States five-dollar Silver Certificate. There have been multiple attempts to replace Andrew Jackson on the $20 bill with Running Antelope.
