= Davy Crockett =

American politician and frontiersman (1786–1836)

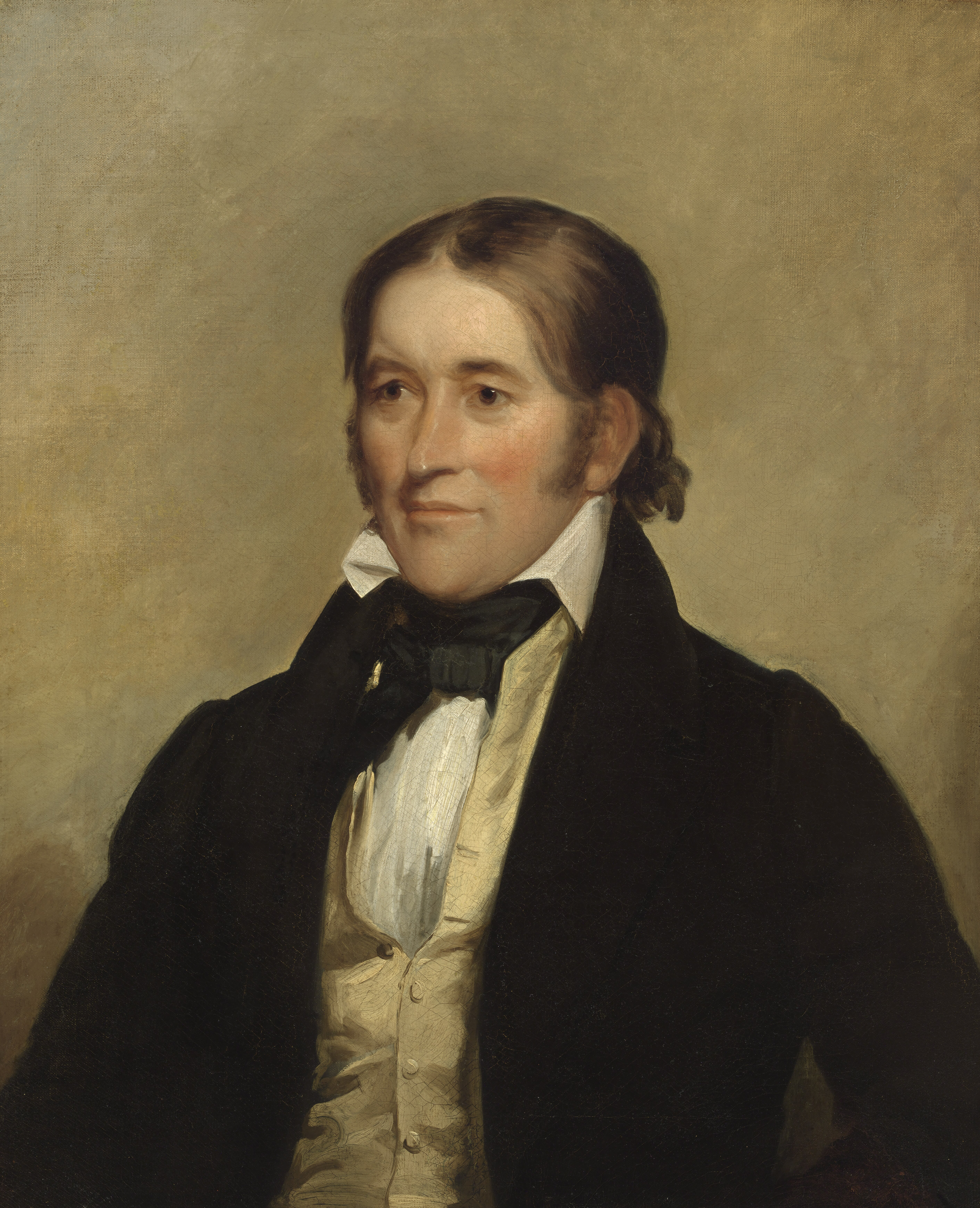
- Portrait by Chester Harding, 1834

Member of the U.S. House of Representatives from Tennessee
- In office March 4, 1833 – March 4, 1835
- Preceded by: Constituency established
- Succeeded by: Adam Huntsman
- Constituency: 12th district
- In office March 4, 1827 – March 4, 1831
- Preceded by: Adam Rankin Alexander
- Succeeded by: William Fitzgerald
- Constituency: 9th district

Personal details
- Born: David Crockett; August 17, 1786 Limestone, Franklin, U.S. (now in Tri-Cities, Tennessee)
- Died: March 6, 1836 (aged 49) San Antonio, Texas (now U.S.)
- Cause of death: Battle of the Alamo
- Party: National Republican (before 1833); Whig (1833–1836)
- Spouses: Polly Finley (m. 1806; died 1815); Elizabeth Patton (m. 1815)
- Children: 6, including John

David Crockett (August 17, 1786 – March 6, 1836) was an American politician, militia officer, and frontiersman. Often referred to in popular culture as the "King of the Wild Frontier", he represented Tennessee in the United States House of Representatives and fought in the Texas Revolution.

Crockett grew up in East Tennessee, where he gained a reputation for hunting and storytelling. He was made a colonel in the militia of Lawrence County, Tennessee, and was elected to the Tennessee state legislature in 1821. In 1827, he was elected to the U.S. Congress where he vehemently opposed many of the policies of President Andrew Jackson, especially the Indian Removal Act. Crockett's opposition to Jackson's policies led to his defeat in the 1831 elections. He was re-elected in 1833, then narrowly lost in 1835, prompting his angry departure to Texas (then the Mexican state of Tejas) shortly thereafter. In early 1836, he took part in the Texas Revolution and died at the Battle of the Alamo. It is unclear whether he died in battle or was executed after being captured by the Mexican Army.

Crockett became famous during his lifetime for larger-than-life exploits popularized by stage plays and almanacs. After his death, he continued to be credited with acts of mythical proportion. These led in the 20th century to television and film portrayals, and he became one of the best-known American folk heroes.

== Family and early life ==
Davy Crockett's father was of Scotch-Irish descent; his mother of English descent. The Crocketts are often claimed to be of French-Huguenot ancestry, descending from a certain Antoine de Saussure Peronette de Crocketagne. However, no link has been established between the Huguenot Crocketts and the Crockett from whom Davy Crockett descended, and historian Gilles Havard deems the story a hoax.

David Crockett (the paternal grandfather of Davy Crockett) was born in Pennsylvania and married Elizabeth Hedge. Historical records indicate that David and Elizabeth were the parents of William, David Jr., Robert, Alexander, James, Joseph, and John (the father of Davy Crockett); they may have had additional children whose records have not yet been found.

John was born c. 1753 in Frederick County, Virginia. The family moved to Tryon County, North Carolina c. 1768. In 1776, the family moved to northeast Tennessee, in the area of modern Hawkins County. John was one of the Overmountain Men who fought in the Battle of Kings Mountain during the American Revolutionary War. He was away as a militia volunteer in 1777 when his parents David and Elizabeth were killed at their home near modern Rogersville by Creeks and Chickamauga Cherokees led by war chief Dragging Canoe. John's brother Joseph was wounded in the skirmish. His brother James was taken prisoner and held for seventeen years.

Landmarks at the David Crockett Birthplace State Park

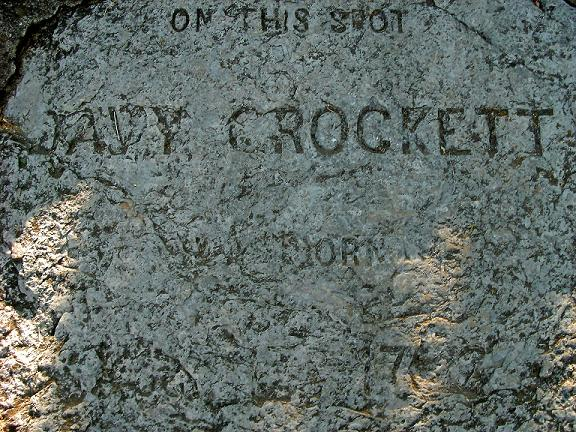
Weathered stone commemorating the spot Crockett was born

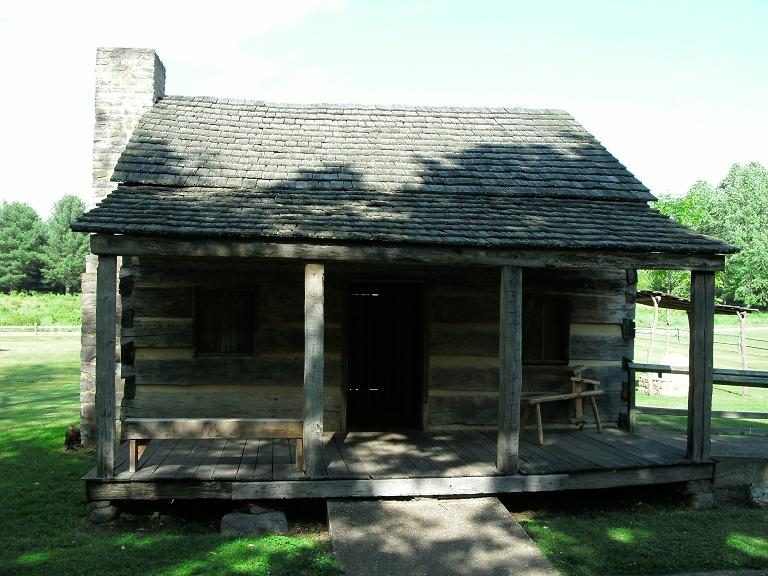
Replica of the cabin Crockett was born in

John married Rebecca Hawkins in 1780. Nine children of John and Rebecca have been verified by historians and Crockett descendants: Nathan, William, Aaron, James, David, John, Elizabeth, Rebecca, and Margaret Catharine. Their son David (nicknamed Davy) was born August 17, 1786, and was named after John's father. Crockett's English ancestry comes from his mother Rebecca Hawkins, as the earliest ancestor arrived in Gloucester County, Virginia in 1658.

John Crockett was active in local politics and an advocate of the independent State of Franklin. Davy Crockett was born in that area, which is now in Greene County, Tennessee, close to the Nolichucky River and near the community of Limestone. A replica of Davy Crockett's birthplace cabin stands near the site, situated in the David Crockett Birthplace State Park.

John continually struggled to make ends meet, and the Crocketts moved to a tract of land on Lick Creek in 1792. John sold that tract of land in 1794 and moved the family to Cove Creek, where he built a gristmill with partner Thomas Galbraith. A flood destroyed the gristmill and the Crockett homestead. The Crocketts then moved to Mossy Creek in Jefferson County, Tennessee, but John forfeited his property in bankruptcy in 1795. The family next moved on to property owned by a Quaker named John Canady – an Irish surname with variant spellings; for example, Crockett's autobiography referred to the property owner as "John Kennedy". At Morristown in the Southwest Territory, John built a tavern on a stage coach route; the Crockett Tavern Museum now stands on that site.

When David was 12 years old, his father indentured him to Jacob Siler to help with the Crockett family indebtedness. He helped tend Siler's cattle as a cowboy on a 400-mile (640 km) trip to near Natural Bridge in Virginia. He was well treated and paid for his services but, after several weeks in Virginia, he decided to return home to Tennessee. The next year, John enrolled his sons in school, but David played hooky after an altercation with a fellow student. Upon learning of this, John attempted to whip him but was outrun by his son. David then joined a cattle drive to Front Royal, Virginia, for Jesse Cheek. Upon completion of that trip, he joined teamster Adam Myers on a trip to Gerrardstown, West Virginia. In between trips with Myers, he worked for farmer John Gray. After leaving Myers, he journeyed to Christiansburg, Virginia, where he apprenticed for the next four years with hatter Elijah Griffith.

In 1800 he ran away from home at age 13 due to problems that he was having. In 1802, David journeyed by foot back to his father's tavern in Tennessee. His father was in debt to Abraham Wilson for $36 (equivalent to $810 in 2025), so David was hired out to Wilson to pay off the debt. Later, he worked off a $40 debt to John Canady. Once the debts were paid, John Crockett told his son that he was free to leave. David returned to Canady's employment, where he stayed for four years.

=== Marriages and children ===
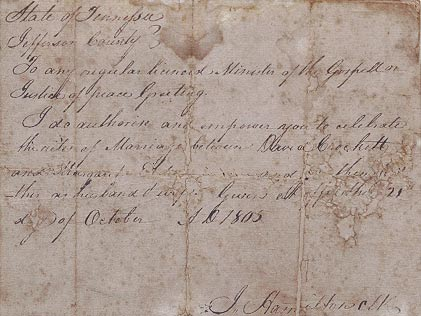
Contract of marriage for David Crockett and Margaret Elder, October 21, 1805

Crockett fell in love with John Canady's niece Amy Summer, who was engaged to Canady's son Robert. While serving as part of the wedding party, Crockett met Margaret Elder. He persuaded her to marry him, and a marriage contract was drawn up on October 21, 1805. However, Margaret had also become engaged to another young man at the same time, whom she married instead of Crockett.

He met Polly Finley and her mother Jean at a harvest festival. Although friendly towards him in the beginning, Jean Finley eventually felt Crockett was not the man for her daughter. Crockett declared his intentions to marry Polly, regardless of whether the ceremony was allowed to take place in her parents' home or had to be performed elsewhere. He arranged for a justice of the peace and took out a marriage license on August 12, 1806. On August 16, he rode to Polly's house with family and friends, determined to ride off with Polly to be married elsewhere. Polly's father pleaded with Crockett to have the wedding in the Finley home. Crockett agreed only after Jean apologized for her past treatment of him.

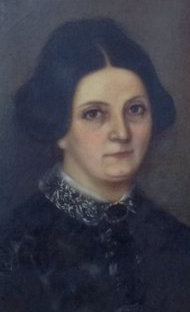
Crockett's second wife, Elizabeth

The newlyweds settled on land near Polly's parents, and their first child, John Wesley Crockett, who became a United States Congressman, was born July 10, 1807. Their second child, William Finley Crockett, was born November 25, 1808. In October 1811, the family relocated to Lincoln County. Their third child Margaret Finley (Polly) Crockett was born on November 25, 1812. The Crocketts then moved to Franklin County in 1813. He named the new home on Beans Creek "Kentuck". His wife died in March 1815, and Crockett asked his brother John and his sister-in-law to move in with him to help care for the children. That same year, he married the widow Elizabeth Patton, who had a daughter, Margaret Ann, and a son, George. David and Elizabeth's son, Robert Patton, was born September 16, 1816. Daughter Rebecca Elvira was born December 25, 1818. Daughter Matilda was born August 2, 1821.

=== David Crockett family tree ===
David Crockett family tree
- David "the Elder" Crockett (1729–1777) m. Elizabeth Hedge (1730–1777)
  - William Crockett (1748–1846)
  - David Crockett Jr.
  - Robert Crockett
  - Alexander Crockett
  - James Crockett
  - Joseph Crockett
  - John Crockett (1753–1834) m. Rebecca Hawkins (1756–1832)
    - Margaret Catharine Crockett (c. 1778–1792)
    - Nathan Crockett (1778–1839)
    - William Crockett (1780–1840)
    - Aaron Crockett (1782–1835)
    - James Patterson Crockett (1784–1834)
    - David Crockett (1786–1836)
      - m. Polly Finley (1788–1815)
        - John Wesley Crockett (1807–1852) m. Martha Hamilton
        - William Finley Crockett (1809–1846) m. Clorinda Boyett
        - Margaret Finley (Polly) Crockett (1812–1860) m. Wiley Flowers
      - m. Elizabeth Patton (1788–1860)
        - Robert Patton Crockett (1816–1889)
          - m. Matilda Porter
          - m. Louisa A. Wohlford
          - m. Lydia America Corley
        - Rebecca Elvira Crockett (1818–1879)
          - m. George Kimbrough
          - m. James Halford
        - Matilda Crockett (1821–1890)
          - m. Thomas P. Tyson
          - m. James Wilson
          - m. Redden Fields
    - John Crockett (1787–1841)
    - Elizabeth Crockett (1788–1805)
    - Rebecca Crockett (1796–1819)

== Tennessee militia service ==
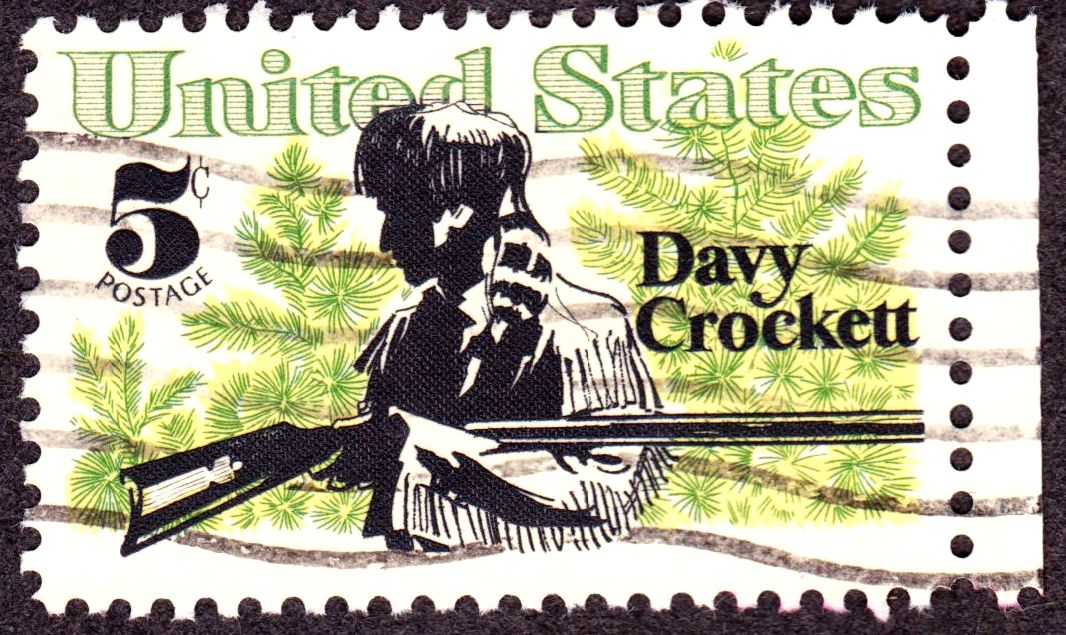
U.S. postage stamp, issued 1967

Andrew Jackson was appointed major general of the Tennessee militia in 1802. The Fort Mims massacre occurred near Mobile, Mississippi Territory, on August 30, 1813, and became a rallying cry for the Creek War. On September 20, Crockett left his family and enlisted as a scout for a term of 90 days with Francis Jones's Company of Mounted Rifleman, part of the Second Regiment of Volunteer Mounted Riflemen. They served under Colonel John Coffee in the war, marching south into present-day Alabama and taking an active part in the fighting. Crockett often hunted wild game for the soldiers, and felt better suited to that role than killing Creek warriors. He served until December 24, 1813.

The War of 1812 was being waged concurrently with the Creek War. After the Treaty of Fort Jackson in August 1814, Andrew Jackson, then with the U.S. Army, wanted the British forces ousted from Spanish Florida and asked for support from the Tennessee militia. Crockett re-enlisted as third sergeant for a six-month term with the Tennessee Mounted Gunmen under Captain John Cowan on September 28, 1814. Crockett's unit saw little of the main action because they were days behind the rest of the troops and were focused mostly on foraging for food. Crockett returned home in December. He was still on a military reserve status until March 1815, so he hired a young man to fulfill the remainder of his service.

== Public career ==
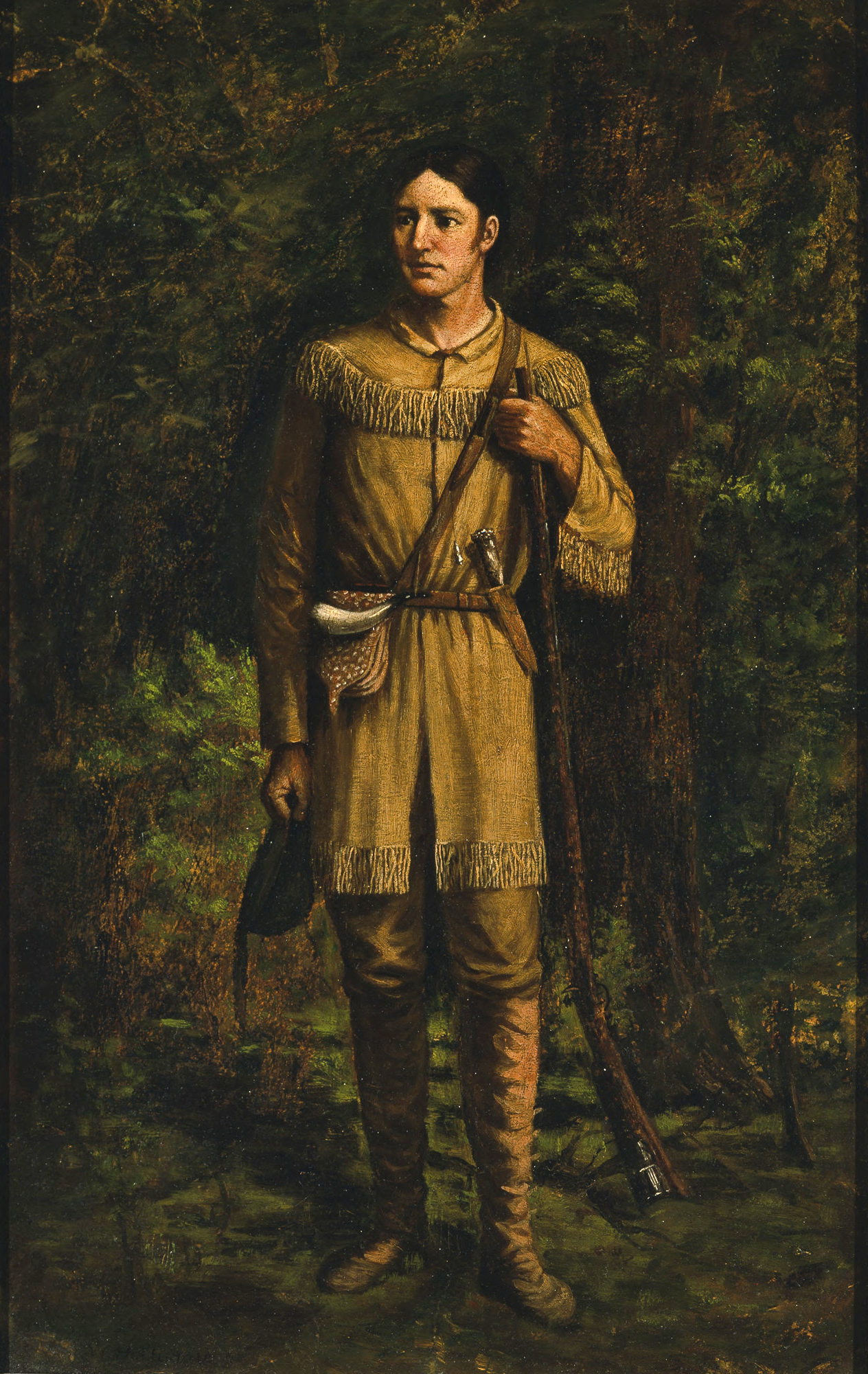
Davy Crockett by William Henry Huddle, 1889

In 1817, Crockett moved the family to new acreage in Lawrence County, where he first entered public office as a commissioner helping to configure the new county's boundaries. On November 25, the state legislature appointed him county justice of the peace. On March 27, 1818, he was elected lieutenant colonel of the Fifty-seventh Regiment of Tennessee Militia, defeating candidate Daniel Matthews for the position. By 1819, Crockett was operating multiple businesses in the area and felt his public responsibilities were beginning to consume so much of his time and energy that he had little left for either family or business. He resigned from the office of justice of the peace and from his position with the regiment. He was a member of the National Republican Party (also known as Anti-Jacksonians) before joining the Whig Party in 1833.

=== Tennessee General Assembly ===
In 1821, he resigned as commissioner and successfully ran for a seat in the Tennessee General Assembly, representing Lawrence and Hickman counties. It was this election where Crockett honed his anecdotal oratory skills. He was appointed to the Committee of Propositions and Grievances on September 17, 1821, and served through the first session that ended November 17, as well as the special session called by the governor in the summer of 1822, ending on August 24. He favored legislation to ease the tax burden on the poor. Crockett spent his entire legislative career fighting for the rights of impoverished settlers who he felt dangled on the precipice of losing title to their land due to the state's complicated system of grants. He supported 1821 gubernatorial candidate William Carroll, over Andrew Jackson's endorsed candidate Edward Ward.

Less than two weeks after Crockett's 1821 election to the General Assembly, a flood of the Tennessee River destroyed Crockett's businesses. In November, Elizabeth's father Robert Patton deeded 800 acres (320 ha) of his Carroll County property to Crockett. Crockett sold off most of the acreage to help settle his debts, and moved his family to the remaining acreage on the Obion River, which remained in Carroll County until 1825 when the boundaries were reconfigured and put it in Gibson County. In 1823, he ran against Andrew Jackson's nephew-in-law William Edward Butler and won a seat in the General Assembly representing the counties of Carroll, Humphreys, Perry, Henderson and Madison. He served in the first session, which ran from September through the end of November 1823, and in the second session that ran September through the end of November 1824, championing the rights of the impoverished farmers. During Andrew Jackson's election to the United States Senate in 1823, Crockett backed his opponent John Williams.

=== United States House of Representatives ===
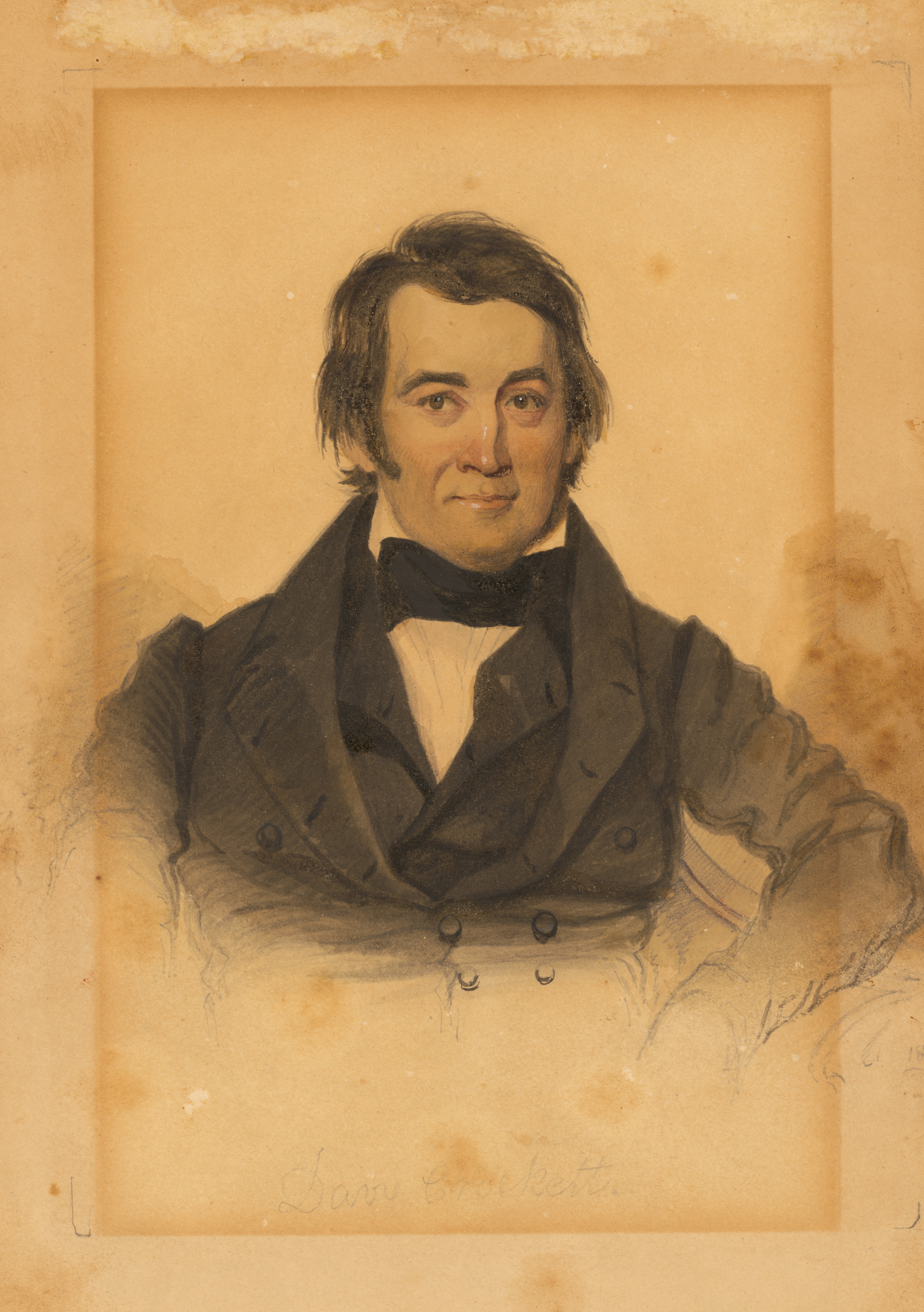
1831 portrait of Crockett by James Hamilton Shegogue

On October 25, 1824, Crockett notified his constituents of his intention to run in the 1825 election for a seat in the U.S. House of Representatives. He lost that election to incumbent Adam Rankin Alexander. A chance meeting in 1826 gained him the encouragement of Memphis mayor Marcus Brutus Winchester to try again to win a seat in Congress. The Jackson Gazette published a letter from Crockett on September 15, 1826, announcing his intention of again challenging Rankin, and stating his opposition to the policies of President John Quincy Adams and Secretary of State Henry Clay and to Rankin's position on the cotton tariff. Militia veteran William Arnold also entered the race, and Crockett easily defeated both political opponents for the 1827–1829 term. He arrived in Washington, D.C., and took up residence at Mrs. Ball's Boarding House, where a number of other legislators lived when Congress was in session. Jackson was elected as president in 1828. Crockett continued his legislative focus on settlers getting a fair deal for land titles, offering H.R. 27 amendment to a bill sponsored by James K. Polk.

I believed it was a wicked, unjust measure. ... I voted against this Indian bill, and my conscience yet tells me that I gave a good honest vote, and one that I believe will not make me ashamed in the day of judgement.

— David Crockett, A Narrative of the Life of David Crockett

Crockett was re-elected for the 1829–1831 session, once again defeating Adam Rankin Alexander. He introduced H.R. 185 amendment to the land bill on January 29, 1830, but it was defeated on May 3. On February 25, 1830, he introduced a resolution to abolish the United States Military Academy at West Point, New York, because he felt that it was public money going to benefit the sons of wealthy men. He spoke out against Congress giving $100,000 to the widow of Stephen Decatur, claiming that Congress was not empowered to do that. He opposed Jackson's 1830 Indian Removal Act and was the only member of the Tennessee delegation to vote against it. Cherokee chief John Ross sent him a letter on January 13, 1831, expressing his thanks for Crockett's vote. His vote was not popular with his own district, and he was defeated in the 1831 election by William Fitzgerald.

Crockett ran against Fitzgerald again in the 1833 election and was returned to Congress, serving until 1835. On January 2, 1834, he introduced the land title resolution H.R. 126, but it never made it as far as being debated on the House floor. He was defeated for re-election in the August 1835 election by Adam Huntsman. During his last term in Congress, he collaborated with Kentucky Congressman Thomas Chilton to write his autobiography, which was published by E. L. Carey and A. Hart in 1834 as A Narrative of the Life of David Crockett, Written by Himself, and he went east to promote the book. In 1836, newspapers published the now-famous quotation attributed to Crockett upon his return to his home state:

I told the people of my district that I would serve them as faithfully as I had done; but if not, they might go to hell, and I would go to Texas.

Despite Crockett's opposition to the institution of slavery in the United States, he did enslave people.

== Texas Revolution ==
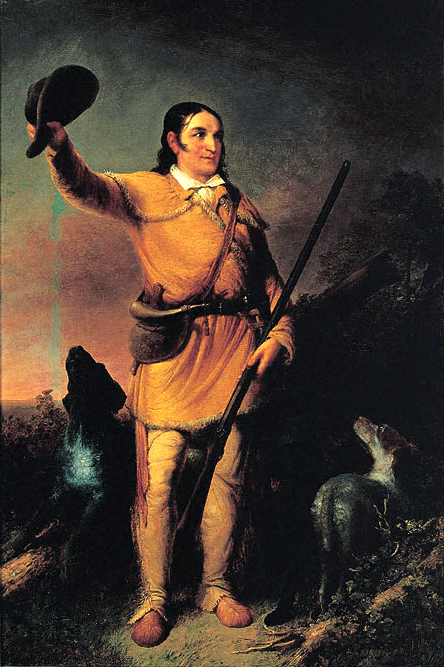
Portrait of Davy Crockett by John Gadsby Chapman

By December 1834, Crockett was writing to friends about moving to Texas if Jackson's chosen successor Martin Van Buren was elected president. The next year, he discussed with his friend Benjamin McCulloch raising a company of volunteers to take to Texas in the expectation that a revolution was imminent. His departure to Texas was delayed by a court appearance in the last week of October as co-executor of his deceased father-in-law's estate; he finally left his home near Rutherford in West Tennessee with three other men on November 1, 1835, to explore Texas. His youngest child Matilda later wrote that she distinctly remembered the last time that she saw her father:

He was dressed in his hunting suit, wearing a coonskin cap, and carried a fine rifle presented to him by friends in Philadelphia. ... He seemed very confident the morning he went away that he would soon have us all to join him in Texas.

Crockett traveled with 30 well-armed men to Jackson, Tennessee, where he gave a speech from the steps of the Madison County courthouse. They then traveled west, arriving in Little Rock, Arkansas, on November 12, 1835. The local newspapers reported that hundreds of people swarmed into town to get a look at Crockett, and a group of leading citizens put on a dinner in his honor that night at the Jeffries Hotel. Crockett spoke "mainly to the subject of Texan independence", as well as Washington politics.

Crockett arrived in Nacogdoches, Texas, in early January 1836. On January 14, he and 65 other men signed an oath before Judge John Forbes to the Provisional Government of Texas for six months: "I have taken the oath of government and have enrolled my name as a volunteer and will set out for the Rio Grande in a few days with the volunteers from the United States." Each man was promised about 4,600 acres (1,900 ha) of land as payment. On February 6, he and five other men rode into San Antonio de Bexar and camped just outside the town.

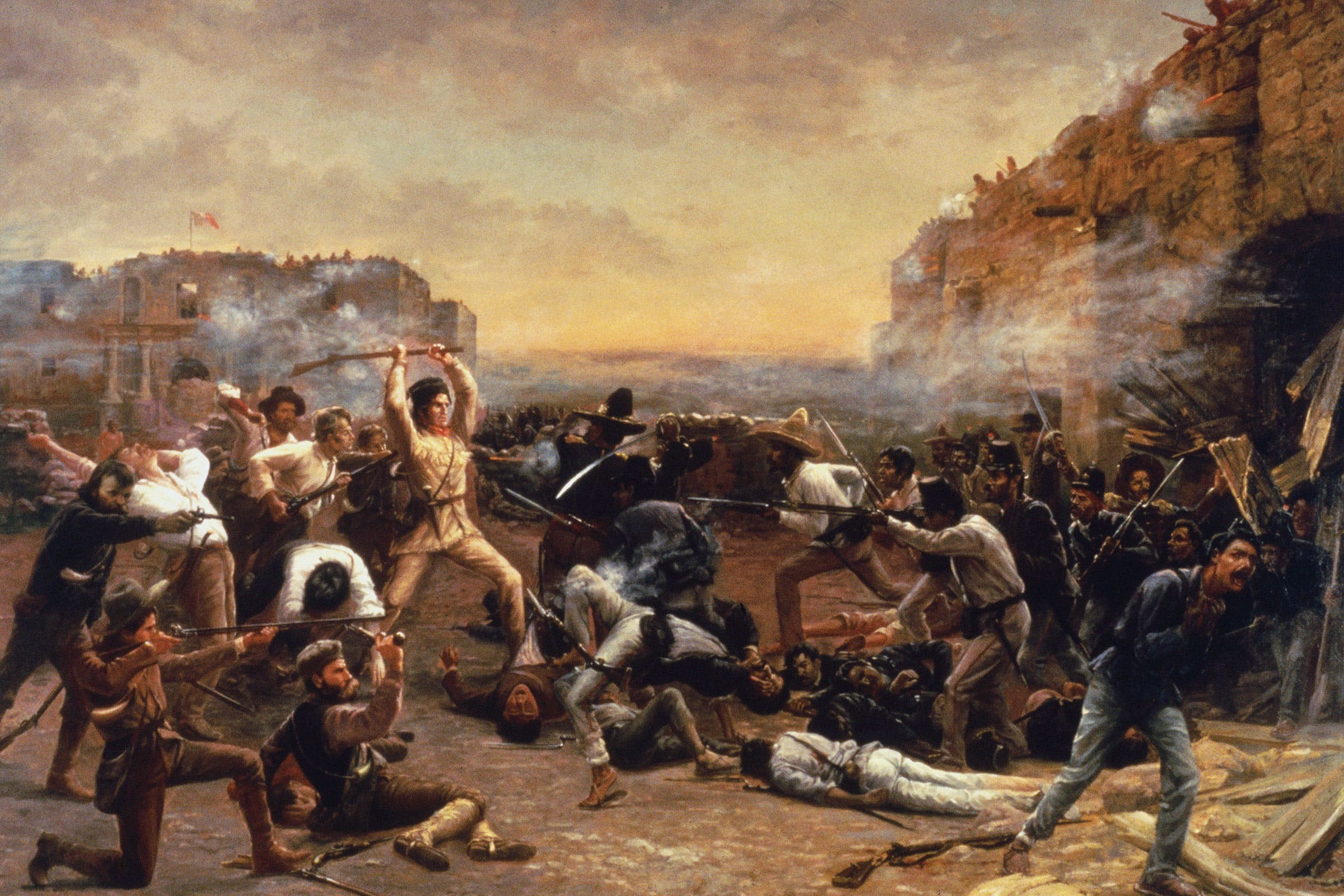
The Fall of the Alamo by Robert Jenkins Onderdonk depicts Davy Crockett swinging his rifle at Mexican troops who have breached the south gate of the mission.

Crockett arrived at the Alamo Mission in San Antonio on February 8. A Mexican army arrived on February 23 led by General Antonio López de Santa Anna, surprising the men garrisoned in the Alamo, and the Mexican soldiers immediately initiated a siege. Santa Anna ordered his artillery to keep up a near-constant bombardment. The guns were moved closer to the Alamo each day, increasing their effectiveness. On February 25, 200–300 Mexican soldiers crossed the San Antonio River and took cover in abandoned shacks approximately 90 to 100 yards (82 to 91 m) from the Alamo walls. The soldiers intended to use the huts as cover to establish another artillery position, although many Texians assumed that they actually were launching an assault on the fort. Several men volunteered to burn the huts. To provide cover, the Alamo cannons fired grapeshot at the Mexican soldiers, and Crockett and his men fired rifles, while other defenders reloaded extra weapons for them to use in maintaining a steady fire. The battle was over within 90 minutes, and the Mexican soldiers retreated. There were limited stores of powder and shot inside the Alamo, and Alamo commander William Barret Travis ordered the artillery to stop returning fire on February 26 so as to conserve precious ammunition. Crockett and his men were encouraged to keep shooting, as they were unusually effective.

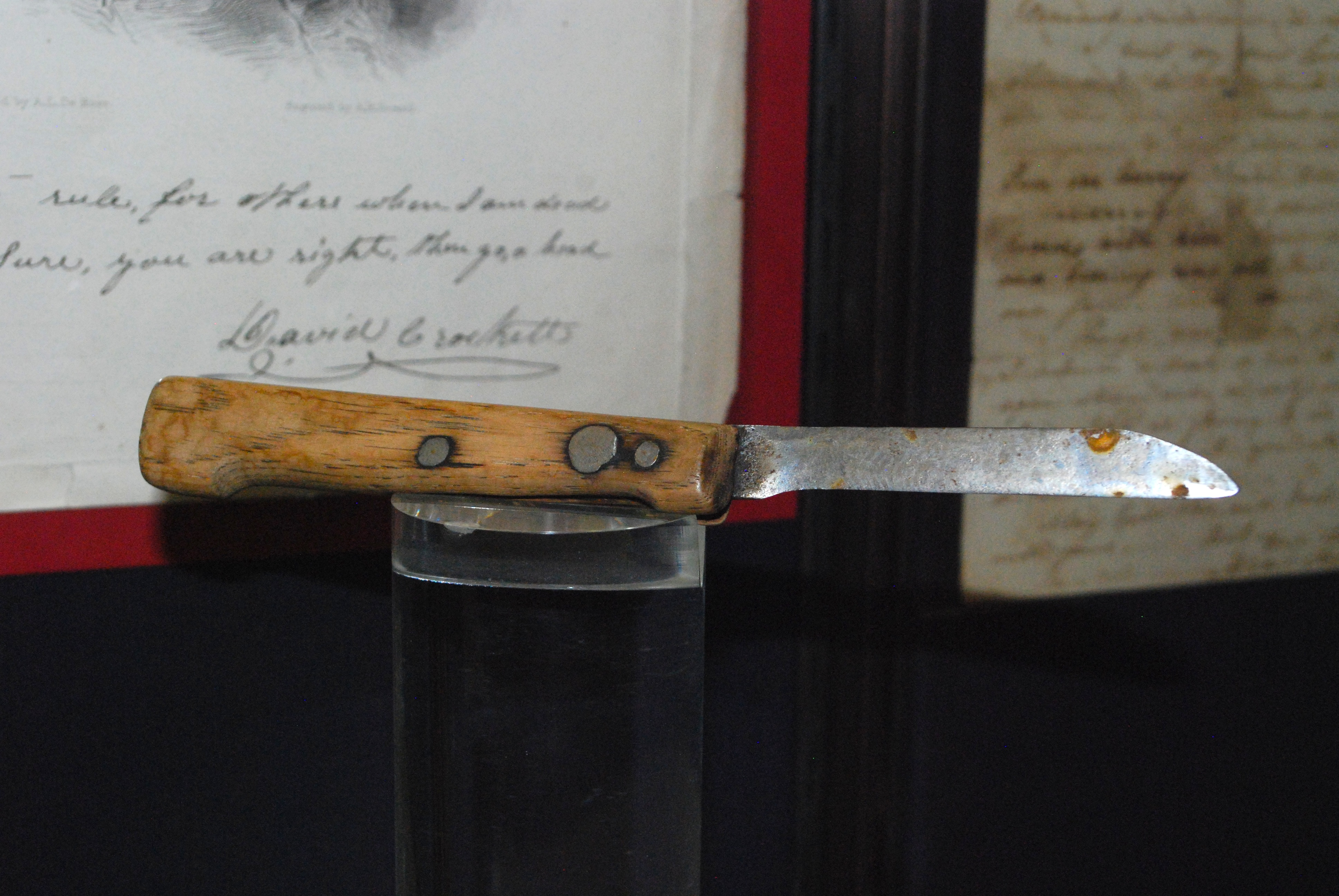
A knife purportedly used by Davy Crockett during the Battle of the Alamo

As the siege progressed, Travis sent many messages asking for reinforcements. Several messengers were sent to James Fannin who commanded the group of Texian soldiers at Presidio La Bahia in Goliad, Texas. Fannin decided that it was too risky to reinforce the Alamo, although historian Thomas Ricks Lindley concludes that up to 50 of Fannin's men left his command to go to Bexar. These men would have reached Cibolo Creek on the afternoon of March 3, 35 miles (56 km) from the Alamo, where they joined another group of men who also planned to join the garrison.

There was a skirmish between Mexican and Texian troops that same night outside the Alamo. Historian Walter Lord speculates that the Texians were creating a diversion to allow their courier John Smith to evade Mexican pickets. However, Alamo survivor Susannah Dickinson said in 1876 that Travis sent out three men shortly after dark on March 3, probably a response to the arrival of Mexican reinforcements. The three men—including Crockett—were sent to find Fannin. Lindley states that Crockett and one of the other men found the force of Texians waiting along Cibolo Creek just before midnight; they had advanced to within 20 miles (32 km) of the Alamo. Just before daylight on March 4, part of the Texian force managed to break through the Mexican lines and enter the Alamo. A second group was driven across the prairie by Mexican cavalry.

The siege ended on March 6 when the Mexican army attacked just before dawn while the defenders were sleeping. The daily artillery bombardment had been suspended, perhaps a ploy to encourage the natural human reaction to a cessation of constant strain. But the garrison awakened and the final fight began. Most of the noncombatants gathered in the church sacristy for safety. According to Dickinson, Crockett paused briefly in the chapel to say a prayer before running to his post. The Mexican soldiers climbed up the north outer walls of the Alamo complex, and most of the Texians fell back to the barracks and the chapel, as previously planned. Crockett and his men, however, were too far from the barracks to take shelter and were the last remaining group to be in the open. They defended the low wall in front of the church, using their rifles as clubs and relying on knives, as the action was too furious to allow reloading. After a volley and a charge with bayonets, Mexican soldiers pushed the few remaining defenders back toward the church.

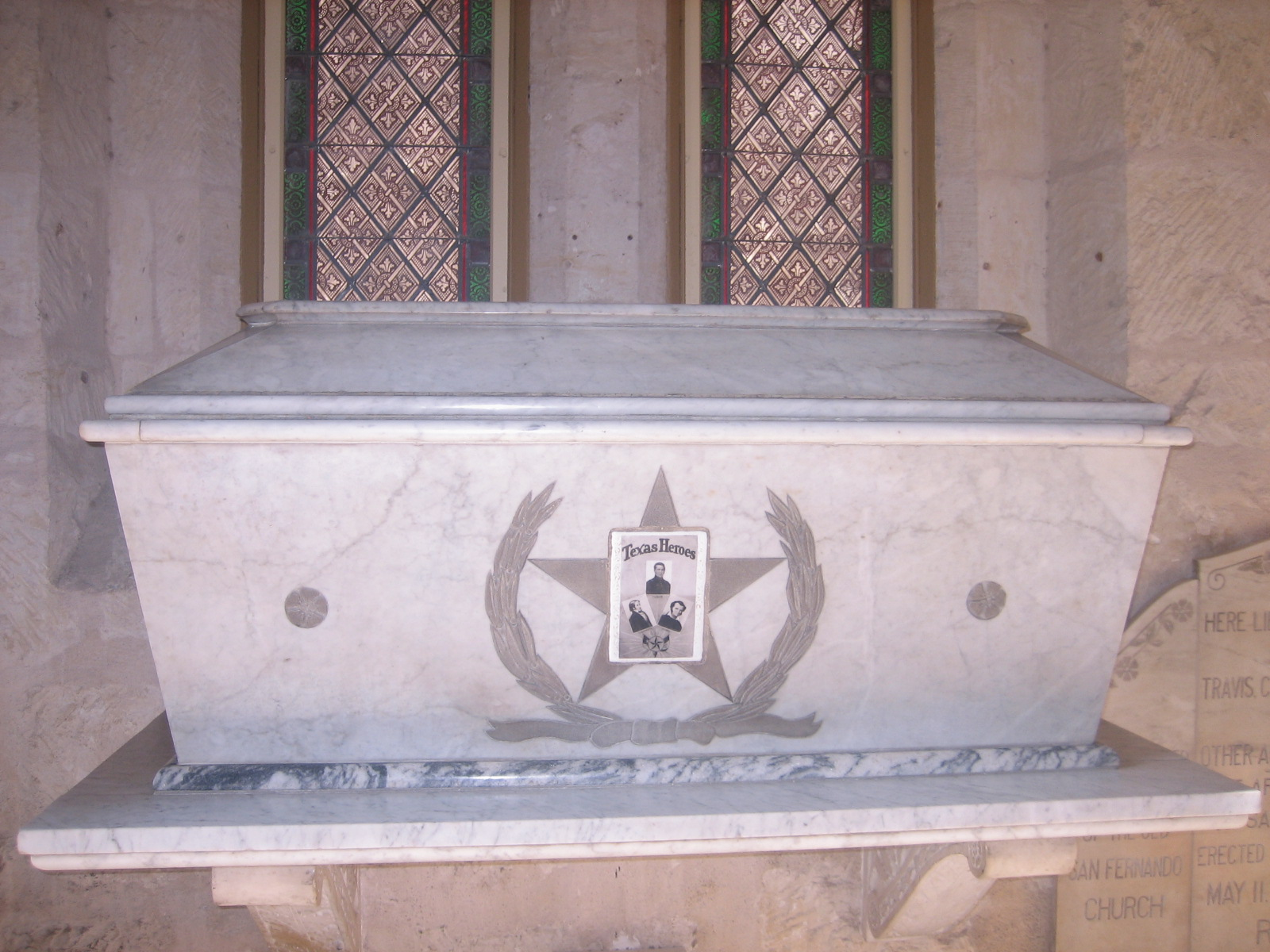
A coffin in the San Fernando Cathedral claims to hold the ashes of the Alamo defenders, including Crockett. However, historians believe it more probable that the ashes were buried near the Alamo.

The Battle of the Alamo lasted almost 90 minutes, and all of the defenders were killed. Santa Anna ordered his men to take their bodies to a nearby stand of trees, where they were stacked together and wood piled on top. That evening, they lit a fire and burned their bodies to ashes. The ashes were left undisturbed until February 1837, when Juan Seguin and his cavalry returned to Bexar to examine the remains. A local carpenter created a simple coffin, and ashes from the funeral pyres were placed inside. The names of Travis, Crockett, and Bowie were inscribed on the lid. The coffin is thought to have been buried in a peach tree grove, but the spot was not marked and can no longer be identified.

== Death ==
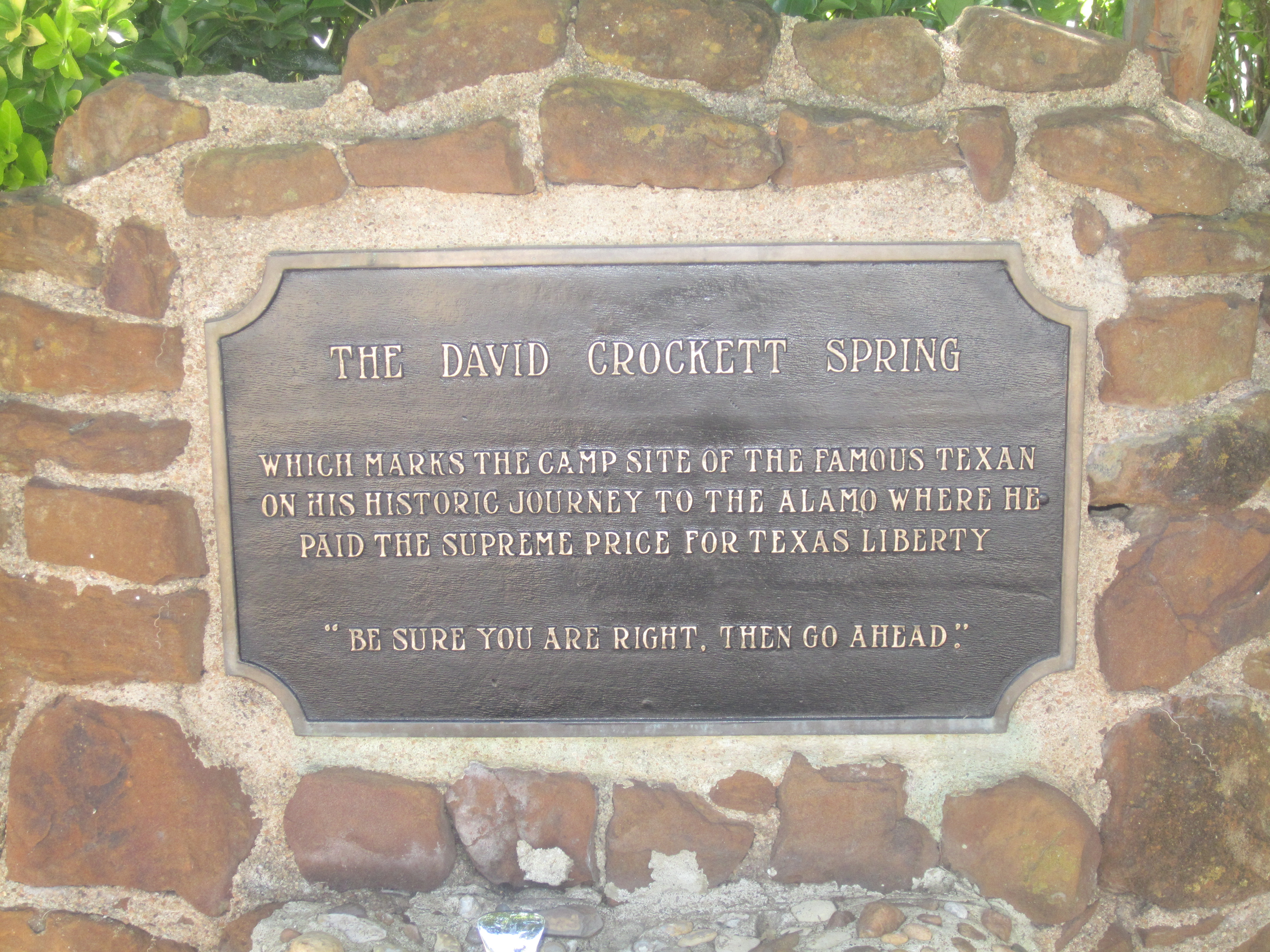
The David Crockett Spring in Crockett, Houston County, Texas

David Crockett died at the Alamo on the morning of March 6, 1836, at the age of 49. Accounts from survivors of the battle differ on the manner of Crockett's death, with stories ranging from Crockett putting up a heroic last stand to the account that he surrendered along with several other men and was executed. To further confusion, historians have been able to back up opposing theories with "voluminous evidence".

=== Controversy ===
The popular mythology of Crockett's death in American culture is one of a heroic last stand, a tale that is backed up by some historical evidence. For example, a former African-American slave named Ben, who had acted as cook for one of Santa Anna's officers, maintained that Crockett's body was found in the barracks surrounded by "no less than sixteen Mexican corpses", with Crockett's knife buried in one of them. There is, however, historical evidence countering the popular myth, with stories of a Crockett surrender and execution circulating as far back as just a few weeks after the battle.

A contrary theory picked up historical steam when, in 1955, Jesús Sánchez Garza discovered the memoirs of José Enrique de la Peña, a Mexican officer present at the Battle of the Alamo, and self-published it as La Rebelión de Texas – Manuscrito Inédito de 1836 por un Oficial de Santa Anna. Texas A&M University Press published the English translation in 1975 With Santa Anna in Texas: A Personal Narrative of the Revolution. The English publication caused a scandal within the United States, as it asserted that Crockett did not die in battle, but was executed soon thereafter. The translator of the English publication, Carmen Perry, the former librarian of the Daughters of the Republic of Texas, was harassed with anonymous letters and intimidating phone calls by Crockett loyalists who considered the mere suggestion that Crockett had not died fighting blasphemous.

Some have questioned the validity of the text. Author and retired firefighter William Groneman III posited that the journals were made up of several different types of paper from several different paper manufacturers, all cut down to fit. Longtime John Wayne enthusiast Joseph Musso also questioned the validity of de la Peña's diary, basing his suspicions on the timing of the diary's release, and the fact that historical interest in the topic rose around the same time as the Walt Disney mini-series Davy Crockett was released in 1955. Some questions were answered when, in 2001, archivist David Gracy published a detailed analysis of the manuscript, including lab results. He found, among other things, that the paper and ink were of a type used by the Mexican army in the 1830s, and the handwriting matched that on other documents in the Mexican military archives that were written or signed by de la Peña.

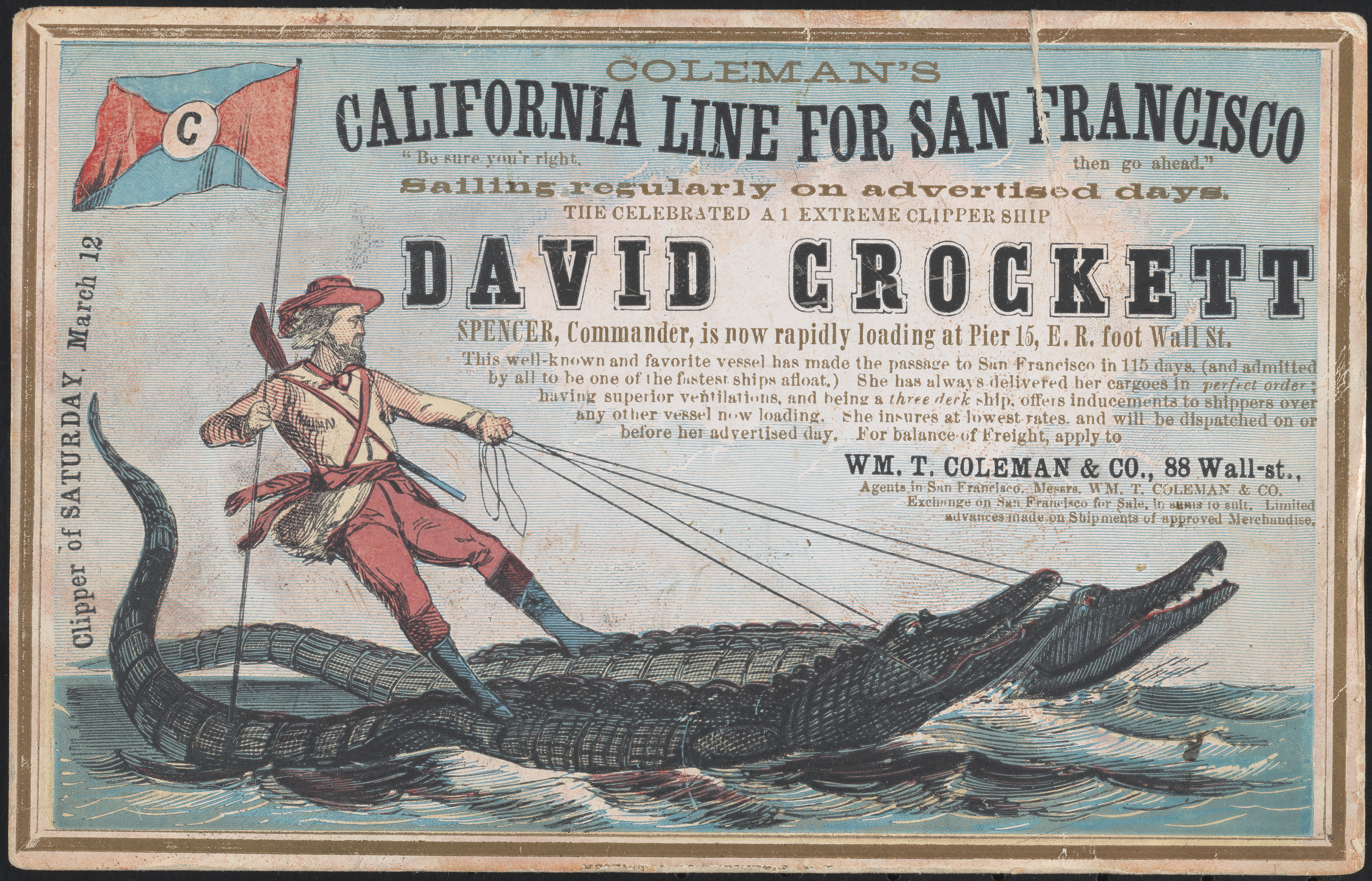
David Crockett clipper ship card

As for those who have questioned de la Peña's ability to identify any of the Alamo defenders by name, historians believe that de la Peña likely witnessed or was told about executions of the Alamo survivors. And while some claim neither he nor his comrades would have known who those men were, others conclude that the "enormous weight of evidence" is in favor of the surrender-execution hypothesis. However, several survivors and first-hand witnesses to the battle claimed Crockett fought to the death. Furthermore, no other officer under Santa Anna's command mentions Crockett's surrender, not even his personal secretary Ramon Caro. Later in life, Santa Anna wrote a memoir only stating that Davy Crockett's body was "among the corpses" without giving context to how he died. Santa Anna further wrote "Not one soldier showed signs of desiring to surrender."

== Legacy ==
One of Crockett's sayings, many of which were published in almanacs between 1835 and 1856 (along with those of Daniel Boone and Kit Carson), was: "Always be sure you are right, then go ahead."

While serving in the United States House of Representatives, Crockett became a Freemason. He entrusted his masonic apron to a friend in Tennessee before leaving for Texas, and it was inherited by the friend's descendant in Kentucky.

In 1967, the U.S. Postal Service issued a 5-cent stamp commemorating Davy Crockett.

=== Namesakes ===
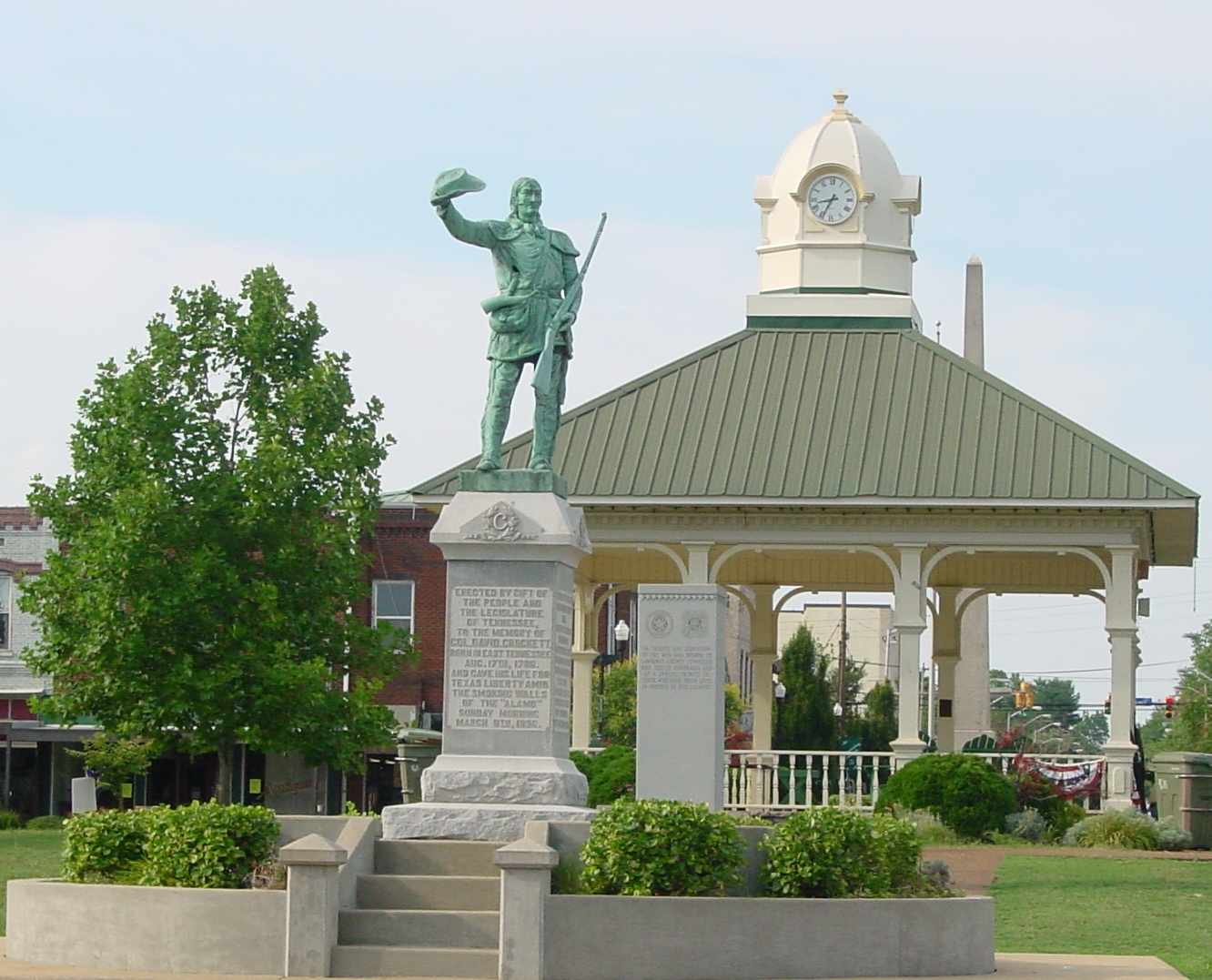
Col. Crockett statue, Lawrenceburg Public Square

Tennessee

- David Crockett Birthplace State Park, Greene County
- David Crockett State Park, Lawrence County
- Crockett County, Tennessee; its county seat is Alamo
- David Crockett High School, Jonesborough

Texas

- Crockett County
- Crockett, Houston County, Texas
- Crockett High School, Austin independent school District
- Davy Crockett Lake, Fannin County
- Davy Crockett Loop, Prairies and Pineywoods Wildlife Trail – East
- Crockett Middle School, Amarillo
- Davy Crockett National Forest, Angelina County
- Davy Crockett School, Dallas independent school District
- Crockett Elementary School, Abilene independent school District, Abilene, Texas (closed 2002)
- Crockett Street, a major thoroughfare in Downtown San Antonio
- Crockett Street in Beaumont Texas, ending in a pedestrian walk in the historic downtown area.
- Fort Crockett, Galveston County

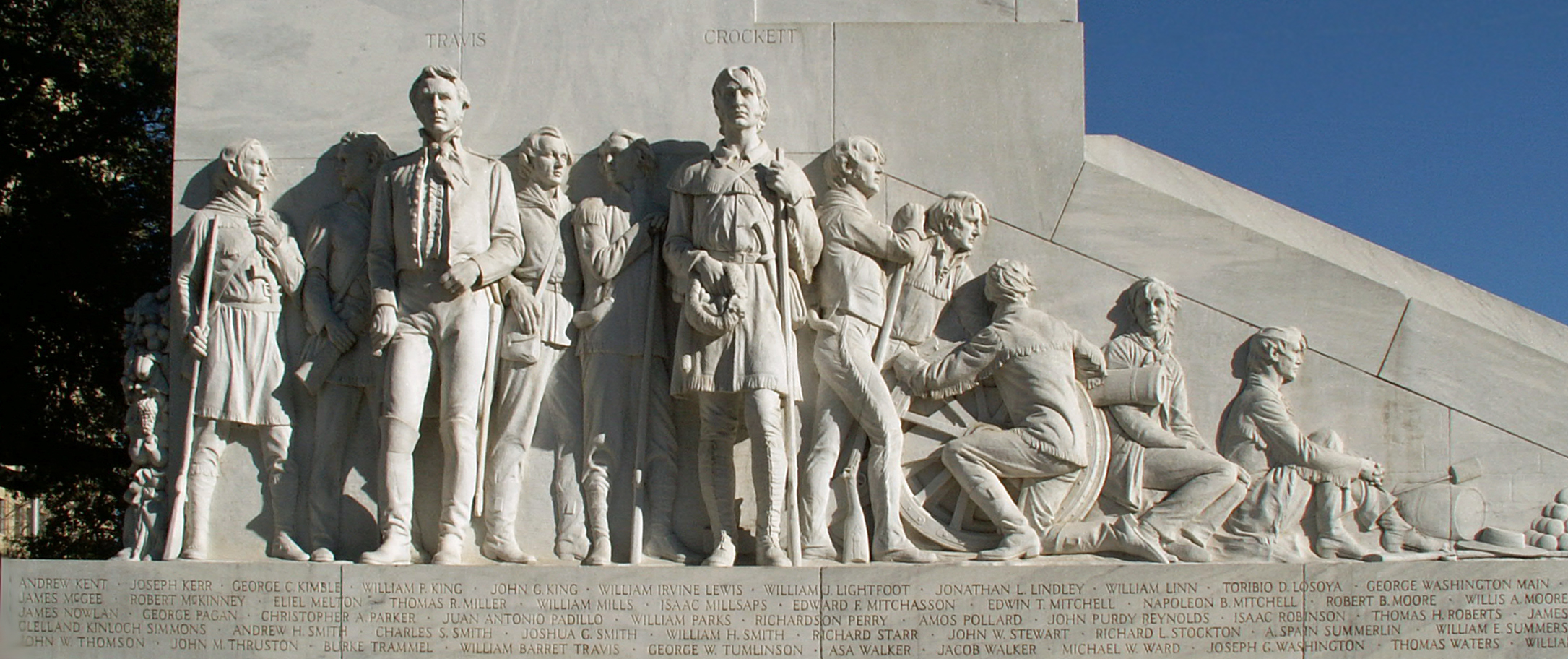
Alamo Cenotaph

Miscellaneous

- M28 Davy Crockett Weapon System: a small Nuclear weapons system, the smallest developed by the U.S. which could be fired from a light vehicle, or from a tripod mounted launcher.
- Crockett Park, north of downtown San Antonio

=== Monuments ===
- Alamo Cenotaph, San Antonio, sculptor Pompeo Coppini, west panel of the Cenotaph features a Crockett statue and a statue of William B. Travis in front of other Alamo defenders
- David Crockett Statue, Statues of Heroes at The Alamo, by George Lundeen
- David Crockett Statue, Ozona, Texas, sculptor William M. McVey
- Life-size statue Colonel David Crockett, Public Square, Lawrenceburg, Tennessee, W. M. Dean Marble Company of Columbia

== In popular culture ==
=== Television ===
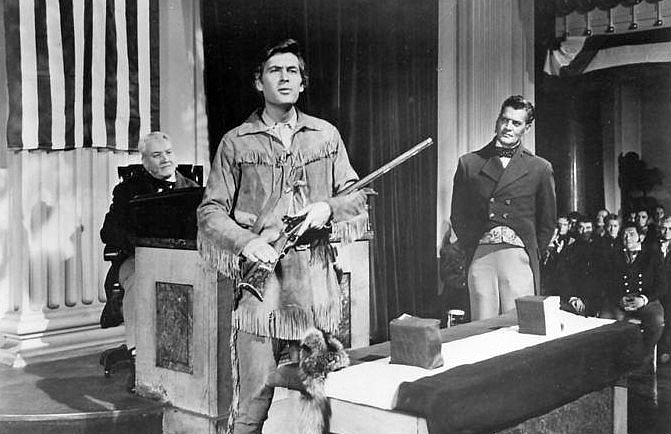
Fess Parker as Davy Crockett in Disneyland

Walt Disney adapted Crockett's stories into a television miniseries titled Davy Crockett, which aired in 1954 and 1955 on Walt Disney's Disneyland. The series popularized the image of Crockett, portrayed by Fess Parker, wearing a coonskin cap, and originated the song "The Ballad of Davy Crockett". The first three parts of the series were edited into a feature-length movie for theaters.

Crockett's stories were used by the French animation Studios Animage for a 1994 animated series titled Davy Crockett.

A 2009 episode of MythBusters tested whether Crockett could split a bullet in half on the blade of an ax 40 yards (37 m) away, and concluded that it would indeed be possible to do so.

=== Film ===
In films, Crockett has been played by:

- Charles K. French (Davy Crockett – In Hearts United, 1909, silent)
- Hobart Bosworth (Davy Crockett, 1910, silent)
- Dustin Farnum (Davy Crockett, 1916, silent)
- Cullen Landis (Davy Crockett at the Fall of the Alamo, 1926, silent)
- Jack Perrin (The Painted Stallion, 1937)
- Lane Chandler (Heroes of the Alamo, 1937)
- Robert Barrat (Man of Conquest, 1939)
- Trevor Bardette (The Man from the Alamo, 1953)
- Arthur Hunnicutt (The Last Command, 1955)
- Fess Parker (Davy Crockett, King of the Wild Frontier, 1955, and Davy Crockett and the River Pirates, 1956, both on Walt Disney's Disneyland)
- James Griffith (The First Texan, 1956)
- John Wayne (The Alamo, 1960)
- Brian Keith (The Alamo: 13 Days to Glory, 1987)
- Merrill Connally (Alamo: The Price of Freedom, 1988)
- Johnny Cash (Davy Crockett: Rainbow in the Thunder, 1988)
- Tim Dunigan (Davy Crockett: Rainbow in the Thunder, Davy Crockett: A Natural Man, Davy Crockett: Guardian Spirit, Davy Crockett: Letter to Polly, 1988–1989)
- David Zucker (The Naked Gun 2½: The Smell of Fear, 1991 (a very small cameo role))
- John Schneider (James A. Michener's Texas, 1994)
- Scott Wickware (Dear America: A Line in the Sand, 2000)
- Justin Howard (The Anarchist Cookbook, 2002)
- Billy Bob Thornton (The Alamo, 2004)

=== Theatre ===
- Davy Crockett (1872), popular touring play of its time, by Frank Murdoch
- Davy Crockett, musical play (unfinished), January to April 1938, Kurt Weill

=== Prose fiction ===
Crockett appears in at least two short alternate history works: "Chickasaw Slave" by Judith Moffett in Mike Resnick's anthology Alternate Presidents (1992), where Crockett is the seventh President of the United States; and "Empire" by William Sanders, in Harry Turtledove's anthology Alternate Generals II (2002) where Crockett fights for Emperor Napoleon I of Louisiana in a conflict analogous to the War of 1812. Crockett is also a character in Gore Vidal's novel Burr as a congressman from Tennessee.

=== Comics ===
Columbia Features syndicated a comic strip, Davy Crockett, Frontiersman, from June 20, 1955, until 1959. Stories were by France Herron and the artwork was ghosted in early 1956 by Jack Kirby.

== See also ==
- List of Freemasons
- List of solved missing person cases (pre-1950)
- Timeline of the Texas Revolution

== General and cited references ==
- Abramson, Rudy; Haskell, Jean; Lofaro, Michael (2006). Encyclopedia of Appalachia. Knoxville: University of Tennessee Press. ISBN 978-1-57233-456-4.
- Bense, Judith A. (1999). Archaeology of Colonial Pensacola (Florida Museum of Natural History: Ripley P. Bullen Series). Gainesville: University Press of Florida. ISBN 978-0-8130-1661-0.
- Boylston, James R.; Wiener, Allen J. (2009). David Crockett in Congress: The Rise and Fall of the Poor Man's Friend. Houston, TX: Bright Sky Press. ISBN 978-1-933979-51-9.
- Cobia, Manley F. Jr. (2003). Journey into the Land of Trials: The Story of Davy Crockett's Expedition to the Alamo. Franklin, TN: Hillsboro Press. ISBN 978-1-57736-268-5.
- Cozad, W. Lee (2002). Those Magnificent Mountain Movies: The Golden Years 1911–1939. Lake Arrowhead, CA: Rim of the World Historic Society. ISBN 978-0-9723372-1-2.
- Crockett, David (1834). A Narrative of the Life of David Crockett. Baltimore, MD: E. L. Carey and A. Hart. OCLC 1306778.
- Derr, Mark (1983). The Frontiersman: The Real Life and the Many Legends of Davy Crockett. New York: William Morrow. ISBN 978-0-688-13798-4.
- DRT (2001). Daughters of Republic of Texas – Vol II. Paducah, KY: Turner Publishing. ISBN 978-1-56311-641-4.
- Edmondson, J.R. (2000). The Alamo Story-From History to Current Conflicts. Plano: Republic of Texas Press. ISBN 978-0-585-24106-7.
- Fulgham, Richard Lee (2000). Appalachian Genesis: The Clinch River Valley from Prehistoric Times to the End of the Frontier Era. Johnson City, TN: Overmountain Press. ISBN 978-1-57072-088-8.
- Groneman, Bill (1999). Death of a Legend: The Myth and Mystery Surrounding the Death of Davy Crockett. Plano: Republic of Texas Press. ISBN 978-0-585-26267-3.
- Groneman, William (2005). David Crockett: Hero of the Common Man. New York: Forge Books. ISBN 978-0-7653-1067-5.
- Hardin, Stephen L.. (1994). Texian Iliad. Austin: University of Texas Press. ISBN 978-0-292-73086-1.
- Hasday, Judy L. (2010). Davy Crockett (Legends of the Wild West). New York: Chelsea House Publications. ISBN 978-1-60413-592-3.
- Jones, Randell (2006). In the Footsteps of Davy Crockett. Winston-Salem, NC: John F. Blair. ISBN 978-0-89587-324-8.
- Langman, Larry (1992). A guide to silent westerns. New York: Greenwood. ISBN 978-0-313-27858-7.
- Langman, Larry; Ebner, David (2001). Hollywood's Image of the South: A Century of Southern Films. New York: Greenwood. ISBN 978-0-313-31886-3.
- Lindley, Thomas Ricks (2003). Alamo Traces: New Evidence and New Conclusions. Lanham, MD: Republic of Texas Press. ISBN 978-1-55622-983-1.
- Little, Carol Morris (1996). A Comprehensive Guide to Outdoor Sculpture in Texas. Austin: University of Texas Press. ISBN 978-0-292-76036-3.
- Lord, Walter (1978) [1961]. A Time to Stand. Lincoln: University of Nebraska Press. ISBN 0-8032-7902-7.
- Marill, Alvin H. (2011). Television Westerns: Six Decades of Sagebrush Sheriffs, Scalawags, and Sidewinders. Lanham, MD: Scarecrow Press. ISBN 978-0-8108-8133-4.
- Michno, Gregory; Michno, Gregory F.; Michno, Susan (2008). Circle the Wagons!: Attacks on Wagon Trains in History and Hollywood Films. Jefferson. NC: McFarland. ISBN 978-0-7864-3997-3.
- Monush, Barry; Willis, John (2005). Screen World: 2004 Film Annual. New York: Applause Theatre & Cinema Books. ISBN 978-1-55783-638-0.
- Niemi, Robert (2006). History in the Media: Film And Television. Santa Barbara, CA: ABC-CLIO. ISBN 978-1-57607-952-2.
- Nofi, Albert A. (1992). The Alamo and the Texas War of Independence, September 30, 1835 to April 21, 1836: Heroes, Myths, and History. Conshohocken, PA: Combined Books, Inc. ISBN 978-0-585-19807-1.
- Petite, Mary Deborah (1999). 1836 Facts about the Alamo and the Texas War for Independence. Mechanicsburg, PA: Savas Publishing Company. ISBN 978-1-882810-35-2.
- Remini, Robert V.; Clark, Wesley K. (2008). Andrew Jackson (Great Generals). New York: Palgrave Macmillan. ISBN 978-0-230-60015-7.
- Roberts, Randy; Olson, James S (2001). A Line in the Sand: The Alamo in Blood and Memory. New York: The Free Press. ISBN 978-0-684-83544-0.
- Tinkle, Lon (1985). 13 Days to Glory: The Siege of the Alamo. College Station: Texas A&M University Press. ISBN 978-0-89096-238-1.. Reprint. Originally published: New York: McGraw-Hill, 1958
- Todish, Timothy J.; Todish, Terry; Spring, Ted (1998). Alamo Sourcebook, 1836: A Comprehensive Guide to the Battle of the Alamo and the Texas Revolution. Austin, TX: Eakin Press. ISBN 978-1-57168-152-2.
- Wallis, Michael (2011). David Crockett: The Lion of the West. New York: W.W. Norton & Company. ISBN 978-0-393-06758-3.
- Whitburn, Joel (2000). Top Pop Singles 1955–1999. Menomonee Falls, WI: Record Research, Inc. ISBN 978-0-89820-142-0.
- Williamson, Jerry Wayne (1995). Hillbillyland: What the Movies Did to the Mountains and What the Mountains Did to the Movies. Chapel Hill: The University of North Carolina Press. ISBN 978-0-8078-4503-5.
- Winders, Richard Bruce (2001). Davy Crockett: The Legend of the Wild Frontier. New York: Rosen Publishing Group. ISBN 978-0-8239-5747-7.

U.S. House of Representatives
Preceded by Adam Rankin Alexander	Member of the U.S. House of Representatives from Tennessee's 9th congressional district 1827–1831	Succeeded by William Fitzgerald
New constituency	Member of the U.S. House of Representatives from Tennessee's 12th congressional district 1833–1835	Succeeded by Adam Huntsman
