= Elizabeth Patton Crockett =

American farmer and housewife (1788–1860)

Elizabeth Crockett
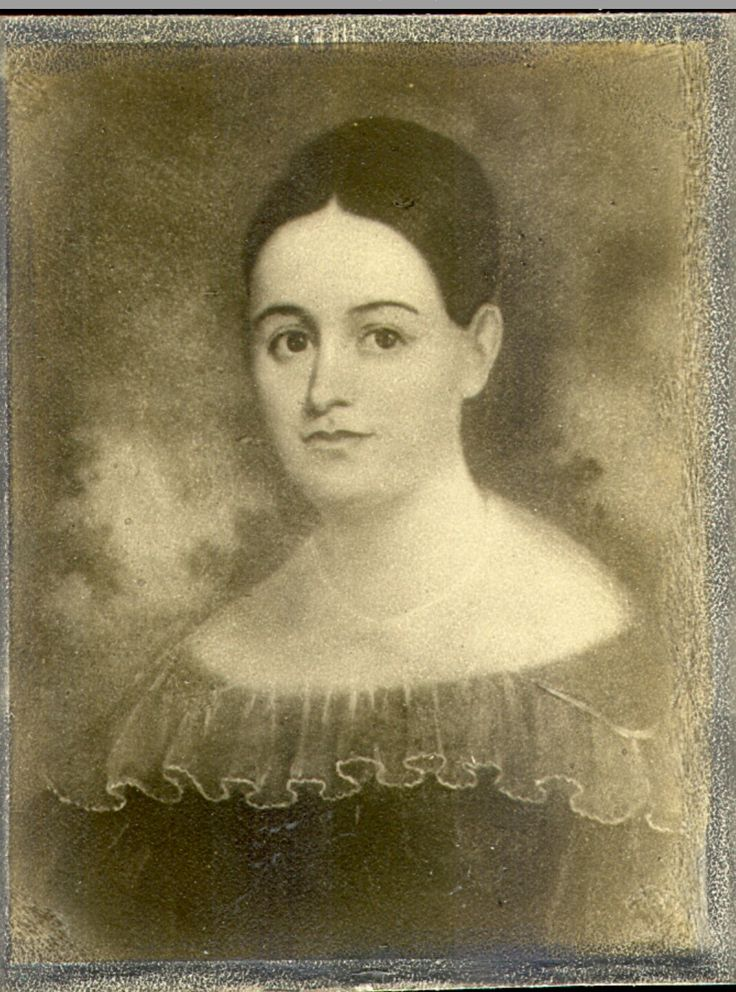
- Elizabeth Crockett, c. 19th century
- Born: Elizabeth Patton; May 22, 1788; Swannanoa, North Carolina
- Died: January 31, 1860 (aged 71); Hood County, Texas
- Resting place: Acton State Historic Site (Cemetery), Texas
- Occupations: Housewife, farmer
- Known for: Wife of David Crockett
- Spouse(s): James Patton (m. 1808; died 1813), David Crockett (m. 1815; died 1836)
- Children: George Patton, Margaret Ann Patton, Robert Patton Crockett, Rebecca Elvira Crockett, Matilda Elizabeth Crockett
- Parents: Robert Patton (father); Rebecca Patton (mother)

Elizabeth Crockett (née Patton; May 22, 1788 - January 31, 1860) was an American farmer and housewife who is recognized in history as the wife of Alamo defender Davy Crockett.

== Early life ==
Elizabeth was born in 1788 to parents Robert and Rebecca Patton in North Carolina. Not much is known about her childhood, but her parents were relatively wealthy from owning much land. During her childhood, she had good habits and had good business in mind.

== Marriages ==
Elizabeth's first marriage was to James Patton, her cousin, and they had two children, Margaret Ann and George. James Patton was killed in 1813 after he was wounded in the Creek Indian War. During his final minutes before he died, he asked a fellow soldier, Davy Crockett, to deliver his personal belongings back to Elizabeth.

Shortly after Crockett met the newly widowed Elizabeth, his wife, Polly Finley, died. Upon noticing that Elizabeth had moved to her birthplace of Buncombe County, North Carolina, he followed her there. She was pleased at Crockett's attention towards her, but she had to be persuaded by Crockett to finally be wedded to him. Eventually, in 1815, they married and had three children, Robert, Rebecca, and Matilda.

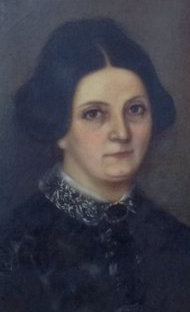
An oil-painting of Elizabeth, c. 19th century

== The Alamo ==
After moving to Lawrence County, Tennessee, Crockett ran for multiple government offices, and became a state representative and a member of the Tennessee General Assembly. He left his family at their home in 1836 and traveled across the southern United States before finally heading to fight in the Alamo with a handful of armed men. On March 6, 1836, Mexican troops seized the Alamo, and had Crockett killed along with the other Alamo defenders.

== Later life and death ==
After Crockett's death, their son, Robert, joined the Republic of Texas army, seeking revenge. He claimed his father's bounty in 1838 and returned to Elizabeth in Tennessee. He then brought Elizabeth back to Texas in 1854, where she received 320 acres of land due to Crockett's brave duty defending the Alamo. Elizabeth remained in Texas for the rest of her life, and reportedly wore black every day since Crockett's death to express her deep mourning. In 1860, she died, and was buried in her black dress.

== Legacy ==
In 1911, the Texas Legislature approved the creation of a monument at her gravesite. In 1913, construction of a 28-foot-high statue of Elizabeth was completed. She is depicted holding one hand as a visor, looking into the distance, awaiting her husband's return.

== See also ==
- Davy Crockett
- Battle of the Alamo
- Siege of the Alamo
- Texas Revolution
- Creek Indian War
