= Helen Sheldon Jacobs Smillie =

American painter (1854–1926)

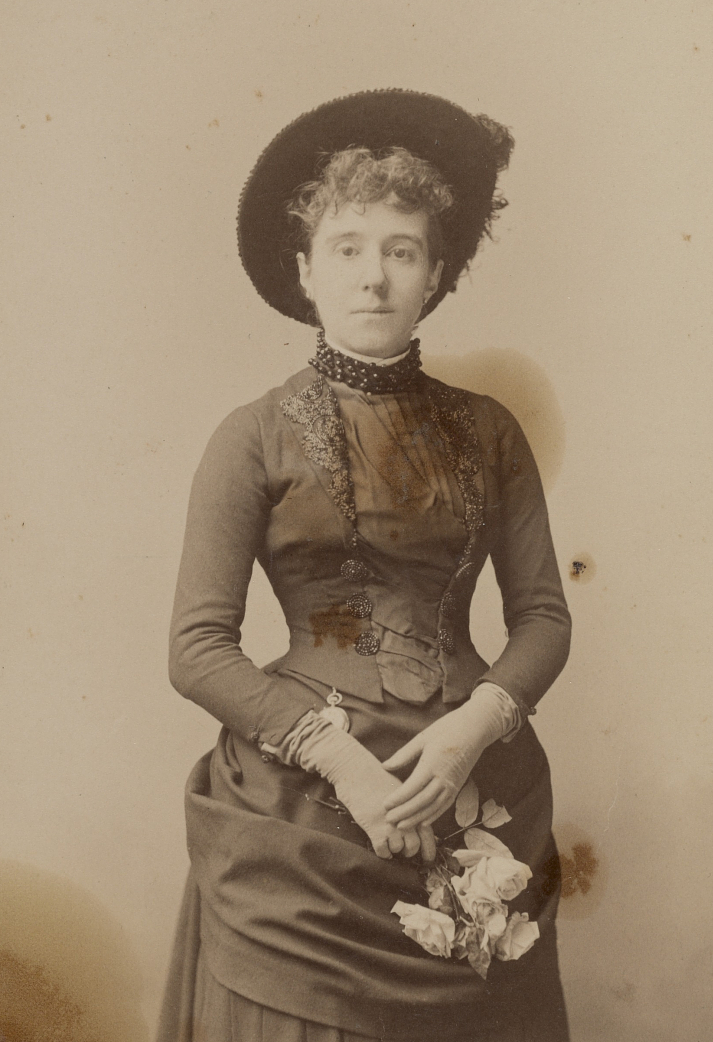
- Helen Sheldon Jacobs Smillie, circa 1870
- Born: Helen Sheldon Jacobs; September 14, 1854; New York City, New York, United States
- Died: July 31, 1926 (aged 71); New York City, New York, United States
- Other names: Nellie Sheldon Jacobs Smillie, Helen Jacobs Smillie
- Education: Cooper Union, National Academy of Design
- Occupation: Visual artist
- Known for: Painter, watercolorist
- Spouse: George Henry Smillie (m. 1881–1921; his death)
- Children: 3
- Relatives: James David Smillie (brother in-law)

Helen "Nellie" Sheldon Jacobs Smillie (née Helen Sheldon Jacobs; 1854 – 1926) was an American painter, known for genre painting and watercolors. She often used the signature N.S.J. Smillie, and the name Nellie Sheldon Jacobs Smillie.

== Biography ==
Helen Sheldon Jacobs was born on September 14, 1854, in New York City, New York to parents Helen Sheldon and Samuel J. Jacobs.

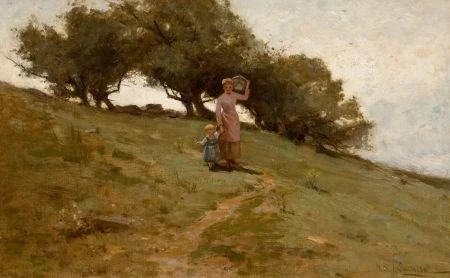
"When the Dew is in the Grass" (1884) by Jacobs Smillie

She studied painting at the Cooper Union, and the National Academy of Design. She also took private art lessons from James David Smillie, and Joseph Oriel Eaton.

She met painter George Henry Smillie through her teacher, his brother James. In June 1881, she married George at All Souls' Church in New York City. Together they had three sons. They shared an art studio on East 36th Street in Manhattan. She was a member of the American Watercolor Society.

A year prior to her death she was ill with a heart condition. Smillie died on July 31, 1926, in at Hotel Shelton in New York City.
