= James Renwick Brevoort =

American painter

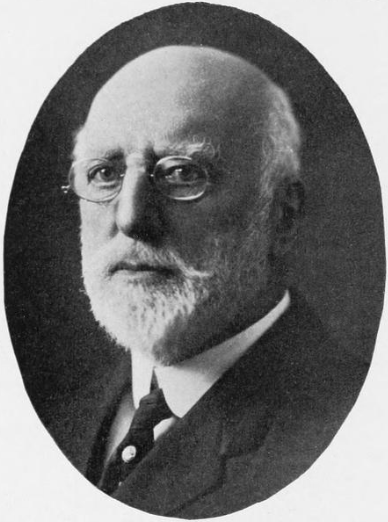
- Born: July 20, 1832; Yonkers, New York, US
- Died: December 15, 1918 (aged 86); Yonkers, New York, US
- Burial place: Woodlawn Cemetery
- Education: New York University
- Occupation: Artist
- Spouses: Augusta Tuthill; Marie Louise Bascom (m. 1873)

James Renwick Brevoort (July 20, 1832 – December 15, 1918) was an American artist known for his landscapes painted in the Hudson River School style.

== Background and career ==
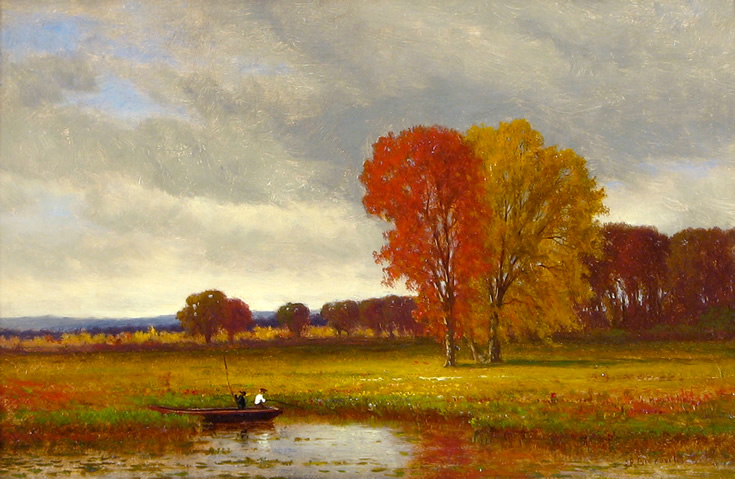
Autumn Meadows, c. 1868

Brevoort was born in Yonkers, New York to a prosperous family with a history of involvement in the arts and architecture. He spent his childhood in what is now The Bronx, which in Brevoort's time was mainly rural. Continuing in the family tradition, Brevoort initiated his study of architecture in 1850 with his cousin, James Renwick Jr., designer of St. Patrick's Cathedral, New York and the Smithsonian Institution in Washington, DC. He gained a certificate in architecture from New York University in 1854, but at some point in the 1850s his interest shifted to traditional painting. Brevoort exhibited his first work at the National Academy of Design in 1856 and was elected an associate member there in 1861.

Brevoort's landscapes during the 1850s and 1860s exhibit the stylistic trademarks of the Hudson River School: scenic views of realism and detail, with an emphasis on light. His favorite subjects were the hills, fields, and rivers of Rockland and Westchester Counties in New York, and the Farmington River in Connecticut, though he did travel farther afield to capture the mountainous and coastal terrain of New England. A number of his paintings are much wider than tall, which allowed Brevoort to emphasize the more tranquil, horizontal aspects of a scene in the manner of the late Hudson River School. In 1861, Brevoort was elected into the National Academy of Design as an Associate member, and became a full member in 1863.

1873 marked a turning point in Brevoort's career. Following the death of his first wife Augusta Tuthill, he married Marie Louise Bascom, a talented artist and exhibitor at the National Academy School. He also auctioned off the entire contents of his studio—over 150 landscapes, including works he obtained from fellow artists Alexander Helwig Wyant, William Hart, Jervis McEntee and George Inness. Then Brevoort and his new wife left for Europe.

Brevoort based himself in Florence, Italy with other American artists, but traveled extensively through Europe. Like most artists of the time he avidly sketched the scenes and people he encountered, gathering material for new paintings. He also undoubtedly attended exhibitions of European artists. Brevoort may have been exposed to the Barbizon school of landscape during this period.

Returning to America in 1880 after his long absence, Brevoort's style began to change. His works became darker and more loosely painted, with an emphasis on mood and shadow, in the spirit of the Barbizon school—an artistic evolution that mirrored the general trend in American art as the Hudson River School declined in popularity. He also painted in watercolor, a medium that his good friend and fellow artist Samuel Colman had championed in America.

Brevoort made his home in Yonkers, New York, and continued painting into the 1910s, having long since abandoned the Hudson River School style. He helped found the Yonkers Art Association in his final years. Brevoort died at home on December 15, 1918, and was buried at Woodlawn Cemetery in The Bronx. Today, relative to other Hudson River School artists of his time, the works of James Renwick Brevoort are lesser-known. However, the combination of technical ability and artistry he exhibited at the height of his Hudson River School period have come to be regarded as among the finest examples in that phase of American landscape painting. Two major American museums, the Corcoran Gallery of Art in Washington, DC, and the Los Angeles County Museum of Art, acquired similar seascapes by Brevoort in 2003 and 2004, respectively, for their permanent collections. The Hudson River Museum in Yonkers, New York, owns an extensive collection of Brevoort's paintings and drawings.

A portrait of Brevoort by Henry Augustus Loop is in the collection of the National Academy of Design.
