= George Henry Smillie =

American painter (1840–1921)

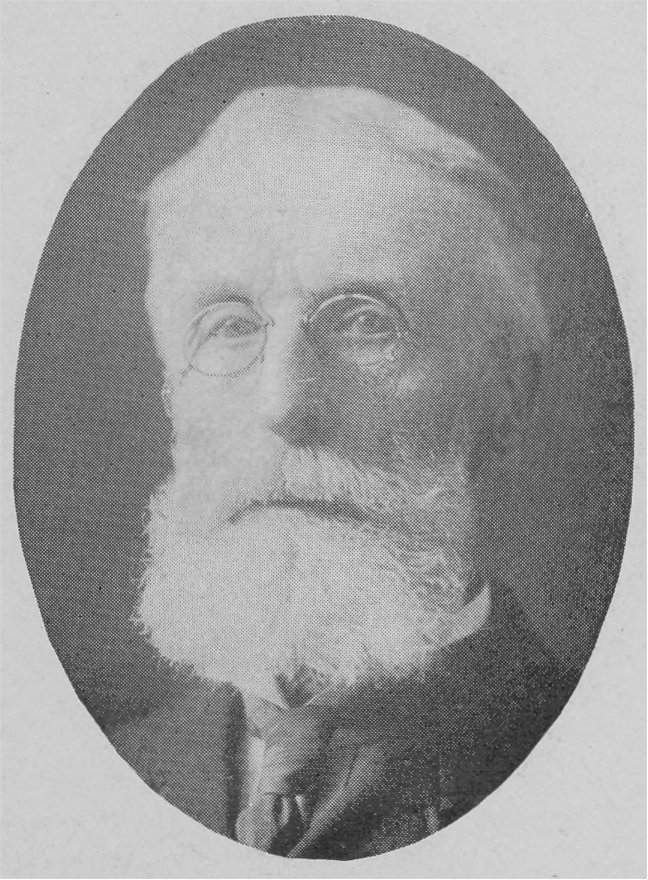
- Born: December 29, 1840; New York City, New York, United States
- Died: November 10, 1921 (aged 80); Bronxville, Westchester County, New York, United States
- Occupations: Painter, etcher
- Spouse: Nellie Sheldon Jacobs (m. 1881–1921; his death)
- Children: 3
- Relatives: James David Smillie (brother)

George Henry Smillie (December 29, 1840 – November 10, 1921) was an American painter and etcher.

== Early life and education ==
George Henry Smillie was born on December 29, 1840, in New York, to parents Catherine (née Vans Valkenburgh) and Scottish-born artist James S. Smillie (1807–1885). He was the brother of artist James David Smillie (1833–1909).

Smillie studied under his father, and under painter James McDougal Hart.

== Career ==
He became a member of the National Academy of Design in 1882. Like his brother, he painted both in oils and in watercolor. His favorite subjects were scenes along the New England coast. In 1871 Smillie travelled west to make landscape paintings and drawings, particularly of the Rocky Mountains and Yosemite Valley.

In June 1881, he married painter Nellie Sheldon Jacobs (1854–1926), at All Souls' Church in New York City. Together they had three sons.

He died on November 10, 1921, in his home in Bronxville, in Westchester County, New York. He was survived by his wife and children.

His work is in museum collections, including the Brooklyn Museum, Smithsonian American Art Museum, the Metropolitan Museum of Art, and the Museum of Fine Arts, Boston.

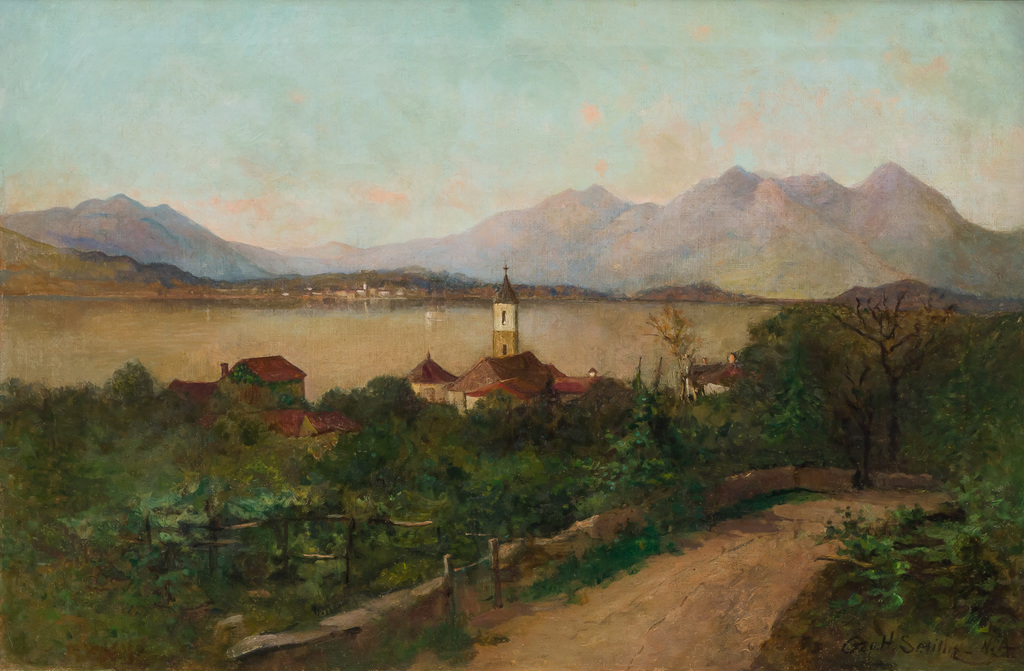
River Landscape with Mountain View

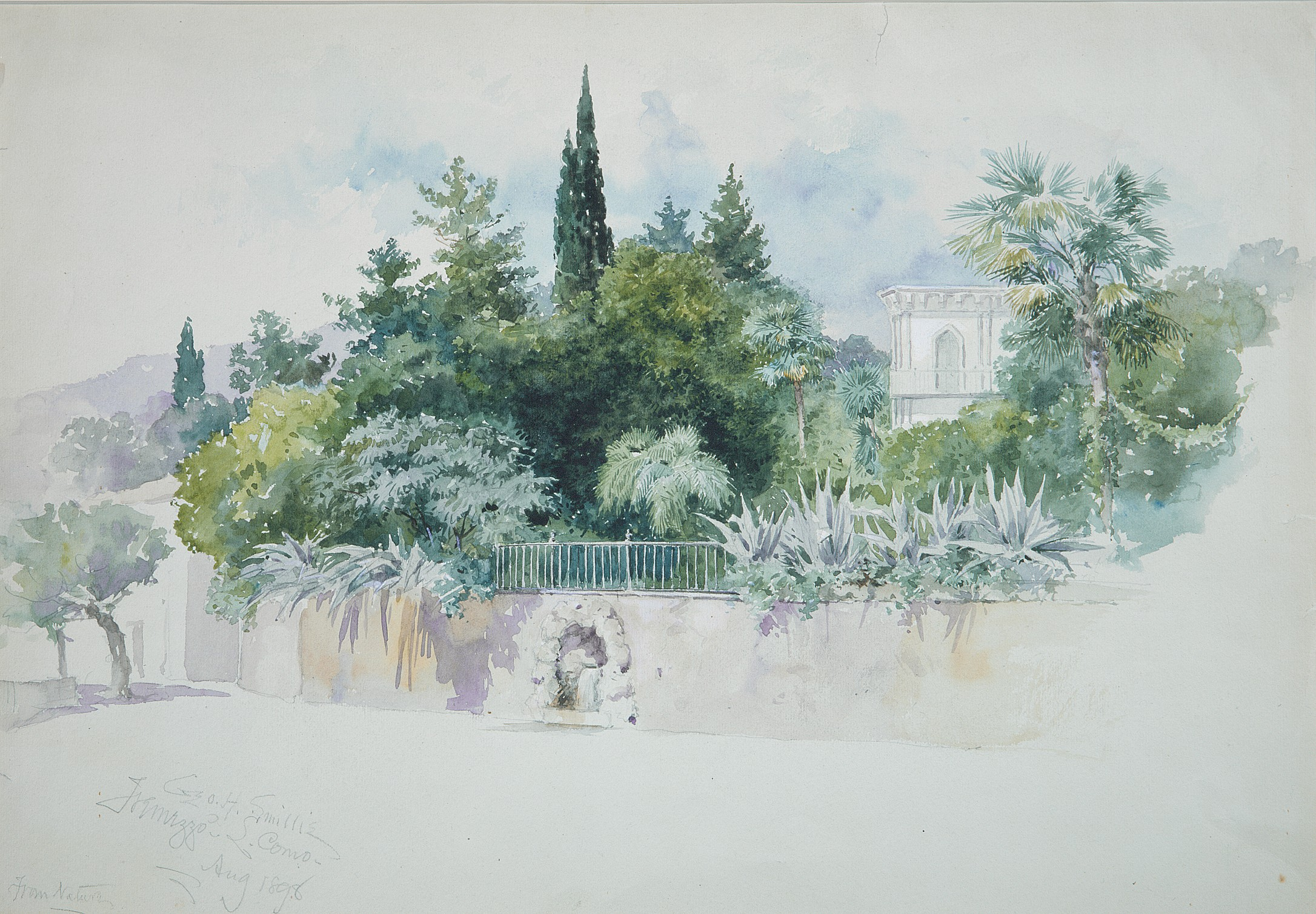
Tremezzo, Lake Como (1898)

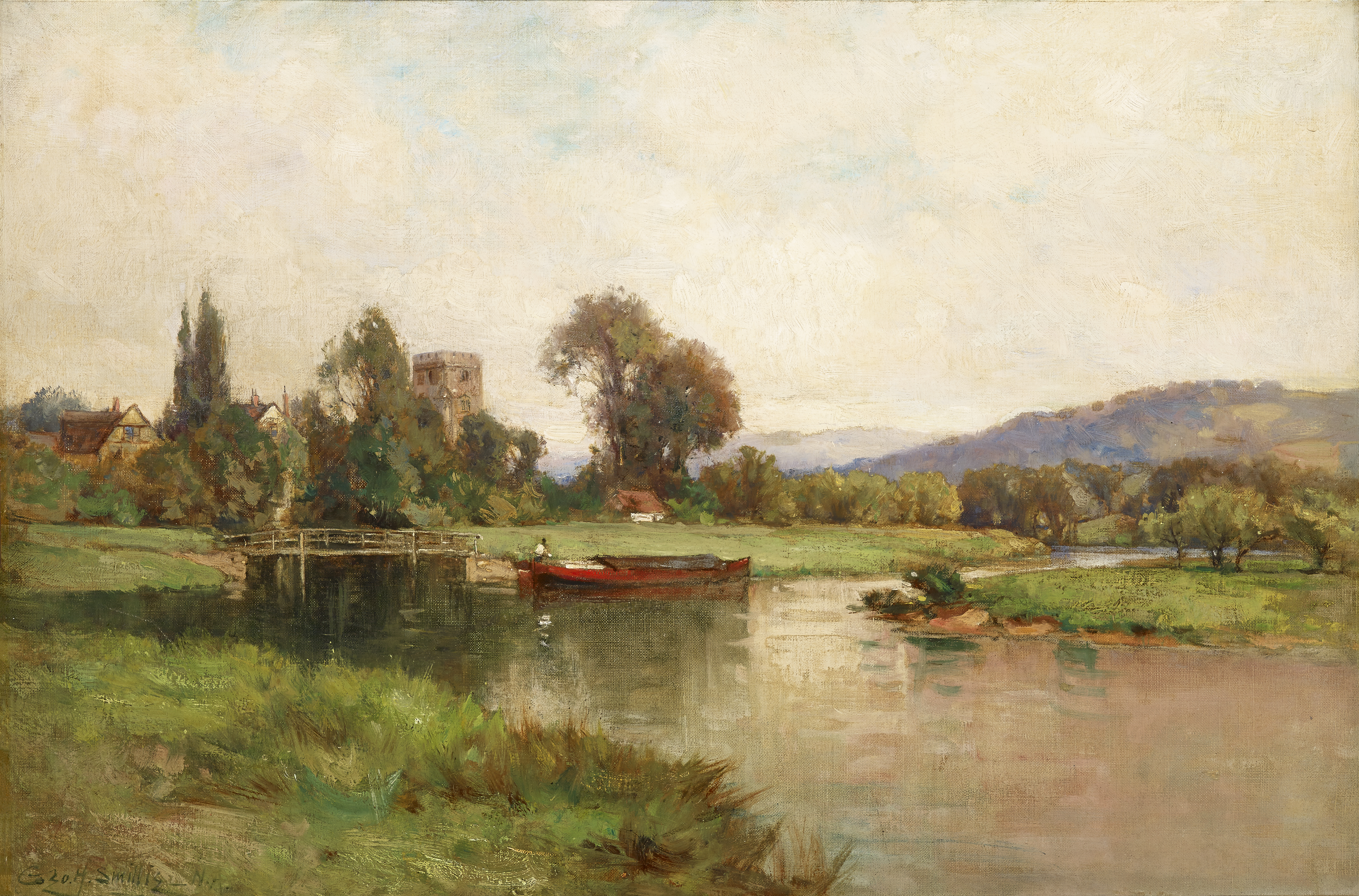
Working on the Thames River (1884)
