= James Hamilton Shegogue =

American painter

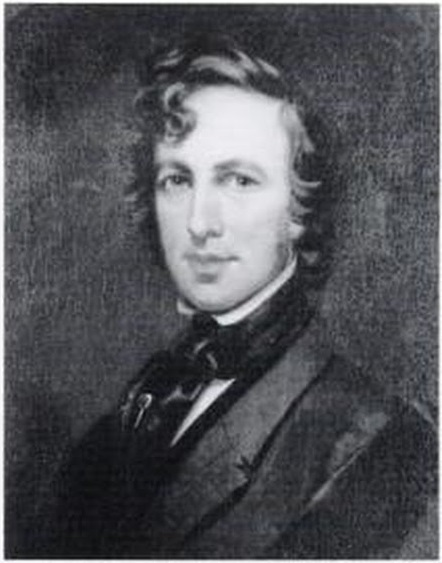
Self-Portrait, c. 1844. In the collection of the National Academy of Design

James Hamilton Shegogue (sometimes styled Shégogue) (February 22, 1806 – April 7, 1872) was an American painter. He was described as a "man of unusual education, a proficient linguist, and a scientific explorer" by one contemporary.

Shegogue was born in Ireland to George Alexander Shegog and his wife Catherine St. Clair Getty. He came to America at the age of eleven, having been sent for by family members who emigrated before him. He was then reared by a maiden aunt in Charleston, South Carolina and became a naturalized citizen in about 1835. The family was of French Huguenot extraction; little is known of his training, though a family letter from the 19th century states that he "studied painting with Vanserlyn and Sully." It has been said he traveled in Europe and studied there in his early years. Around 1833 he exhibited a painting titled An Old Straw Hat, currently unlocated, at the American Academy of Fine Arts; this was the first piece he showed publicly. Among the artists whose notice it attracted was John Trumbull. In 1839 his name was listed on the register of students at the National Academy of Design, but he is known to have already developed a reputation as an artist. In 1846 he traveled to Europe for a year of study, prompting a critic for the Literary World to observe that he had already seen "no small degree of success as a painter of portraits in fancy dresses, with an occasional fancy face." He returned to Europe for other painting trips during his career; on one of these a copy of Guido Reni's Aurora which he painted in the Palazzo Borghese for a New York client won praise from the Princess Borghese.

Shegogue participated in the artistic life of New York City, holding membership in the Old Sketch Club, the Artists Sketch Club, and the Century Association. He was quite prolific as a portraitist, but produced history paintings, landscapes, and genre works as well. He became a member of the National Academy, and later served as that organization's corresponding secretary, from 1849 to 1852. He was adjudged quite successful, and made a good deal of money during his career. Tiring of city life, in 1862 he moved to Warrenville, Connecticut, where he died; he continued to paint up until a few weeks before his death.

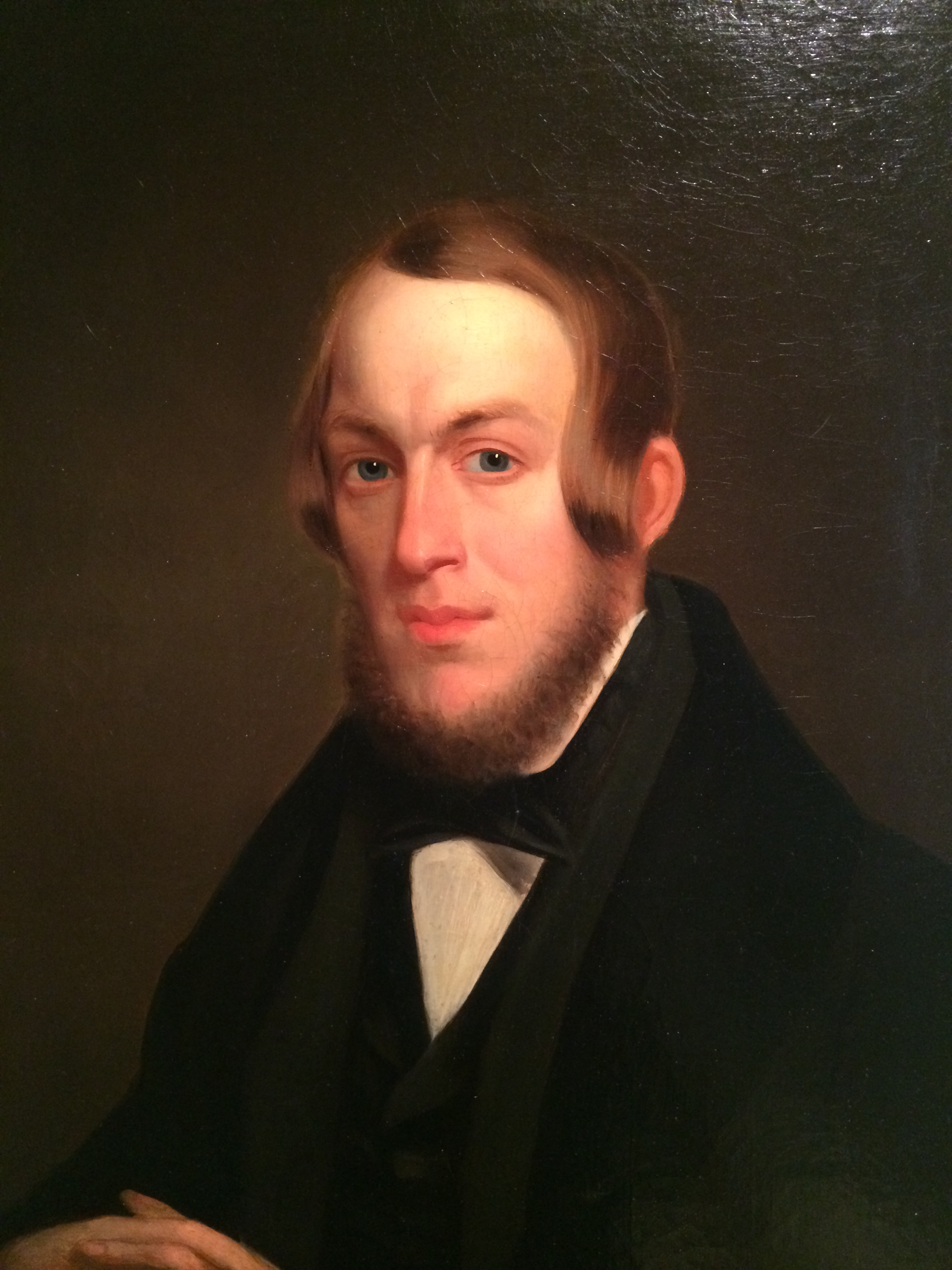
James Hamilton Shegogue

Two portraits by Shegogue are in the National Academy collection, a self-portrait and one of James David Smillie; the former is recorded as having been shown at the Academy's annual exhibition in 1844, suggesting that it was painted to mark his elevation to full member status. Three watercolors are owned by the National Gallery of Art, and an oil portrait is in the collection of the Morris Museum of Art in Augusta, Georgia. The portrait of Davy Crockett is at the National Portrait Gallery in Washington, D.C. Other pieces are owned by the City of New York, the New York Historical Society, and the Brooklyn Museum.
