= Henry Augustus Loop =

American painter

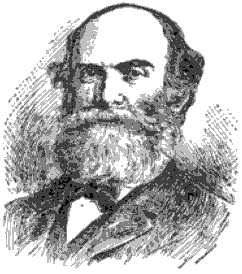
- Born: September 9, 1831; Hillsdale, New York
- Died: October 20, 1895 (aged 64); Lake George, New York
- Occupation: Painter
- Spouse: Jeanette Shepperd Harrison Loop (m. 1865)
- Children: Edith Harrison Loop

Henry Augustus Loop (1831–1895) was an American painter.

== Biography ==
Henry Augustus Loop was born in Hillsdale, New York on September 9, 1831. He was educated in Great Barrington, Massachusetts and studied with Henry Peters Gray in New York and Thomas Couture in Paris. He became an associate of the National Academy of Design in 1859, and was elevated to full membership two years later. Among his pupils was Jeanette Shepperd Harrison, who became his wife in 1865. Their daughter Edith also became a painter.

Loop died at his summer home in Lake George, New York on October 20, 1895.

Portraits in the National Academy's collection by Loop include a self-portrait, as well as those of his wife, James Renwick Brevoort, James David Smillie, and John Bunyan Bristol. Other Loop paintings can be found at the Jay Heritage Center, which owns a portrait of Irish patriot William Kerin Constable; Yale University which owns a portrait of theologian Jonathan Edwards; and the US Navy which owns a portrait of Admiral David Farragut.
