= James David Smillie =

American painter (1833–1909)

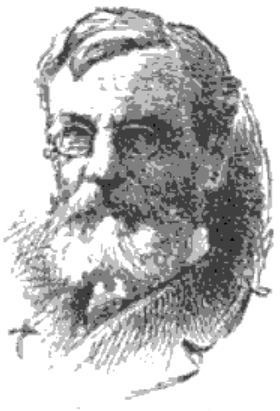
- Portrait of Smillie, 1900
- Born: January 16, 1833; New York, New York
- Died: September 15, 1909 (aged 76); New York, New York
- Occupation: Artist
- Spouse: Anna C. Cook (m. 1881)
- Children: 2
- Father: James Smillie
- Relatives: George Henry Smillie (brother), Helen Sheldon Jacobs Smillie (sister in-law)

James David Smillie (January 16, 1833 – September 15, 1909) was an American artist, cofounder of the American Watercolor Society and New York Etching Club. His brother was painter George Henry Smillie.

== Biography ==
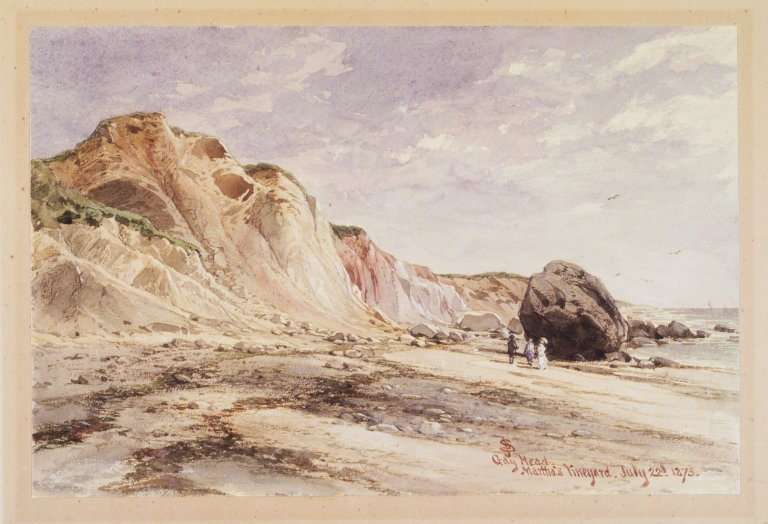
Gay Head, Martha's Vineyard

James David Smillie was born in New York City on January 16, 1833, to parents Catherine (née Vans Valkenburgh) and Scottish-born artist James S. Smillie (1807–1885). His brother, George Henry Smillie, was also a painter.

His father, James Smillie (engraver), was a engraver, who emigrated from Scotland to New York in 1829. His father was elected to the National Academy of Design in 1851, did much, with his uncle William Cumming (1813–1908), to develop the engraving of bank-notes, and was an excellent landscape-engraver.

The son studied with him and in the National Academy of Design; engraved on steel vignettes for bank-notes and some illustrations, notably F. O. C. Darley's pictures for James Fenimore Cooper's novels; was elected an associate of the National Academy in 1865—the year after he first began painting—and an academician in 1876; and was a founder (1866) of the American Water Color Society, of which he was treasurer in 1866–73 and president in 1873–78, and of the New York Etching Club.

He married Anna C. Cook in 1881.

Among his paintings, in oils, are Evening among the Sierras (1876) and The Cliffs of Normandy (1885), and in water colour, A Scrub Race (1876) and The Passing Herd (1888). He wrote and illustrated the article on the Yosemite in Picturesque America. A portrait of Smillie by Henry Augustus Loop is in the collection of the National Academy of Design, as is another by James Hamilton Shegogue.

James David Smillie died on September 15, 1909, at his home in New York City. He was survived by his two children.

== See also ==
- George Frederick Cumming Smillie
