= Jeanette Shepperd Harrison Loop =

American painter

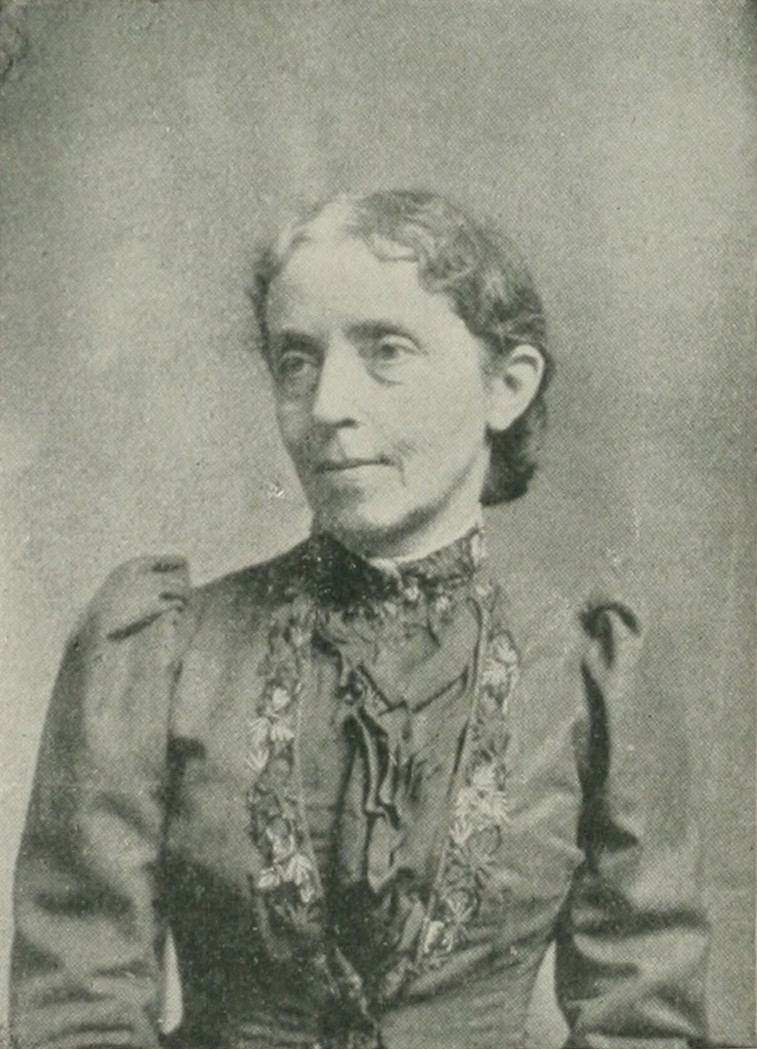
- A Woman of the Century
- Born: 1840; New Haven, Connecticut
- Died: 1909 (aged 68–69)
- Occupation: Painter

Jeanette Shepperd Harrison Loop (1840–1909) was an American painter.

== Biography ==
Born in New Haven, Connecticut, Loop came from a distinguished family, counting among her ancestors Roger and Oliver Wolcott. Her first studies took place in her native city under Louis Bail, later continuing under George Henry Durrie and Wales Hotchkiss, and she set up practice as a portraitist in her hometown, where she was known for painting from life. She moved to New York in 1863 to continue her studies under Henry Augustus Loop, whom she married in 1864; the couple then toured Europe, visiting Paris, Rome, and Venice, and showed work at the Paris Salon of 1869. She was elected as an associate of the National Academy of Design in 1873, but never became a full member, missing out by one vote in 1876. Nevertheless, she continued showing at the Academy, where she had first exhibited in 1866 and 1867; having taken a break until 1871, she rarely missed an annual thereafter until 1905. Exhibiting as Mrs. Henry Augustus Loop, she established herself as a portraitist, especially of children, although she also painted a few idealized genre pieces of children as well. Her portrait in the National Academy collection is by her husband. She died in Saratoga, New York in 1909.

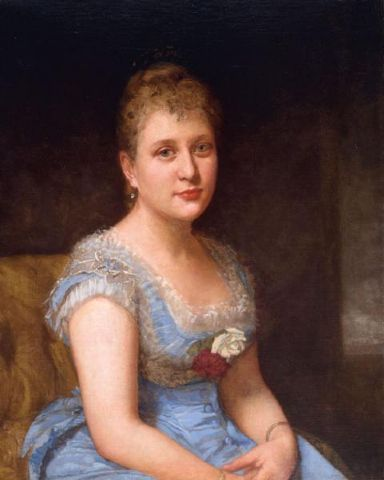
Portrait of a Woman Wearing a Blue Dress with White Lace

The Loops had four daughters; Edith also became a painter.
