= United States five-dollar bill =

Current denomination of United States currency

Five dollars
- Country: United States
- Value: $5
- Width: 6 9/64 inches ≈ 156 mm
- Height: 2 39/64 inches ≈ 66.3 mm
- Weight: 0.035 oz. ≈ 1 g
- Security features: Security fibers, watermark, security thread, micro printing, raised printing, EURion constellation
- Material used: 75% cotton 25% linen
- Years of printing: 1861–present

Obverse
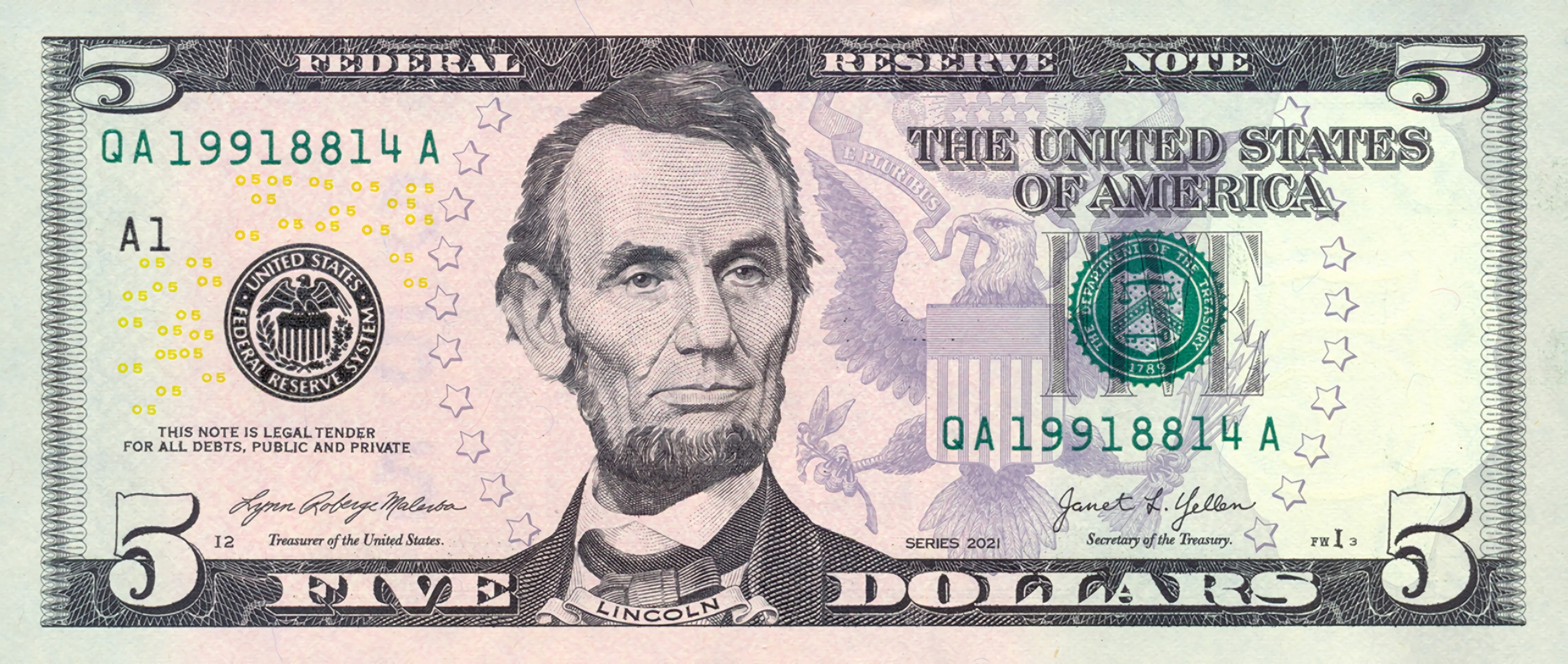
- Design: Abraham Lincoln
- Design date: 2006

Reverse
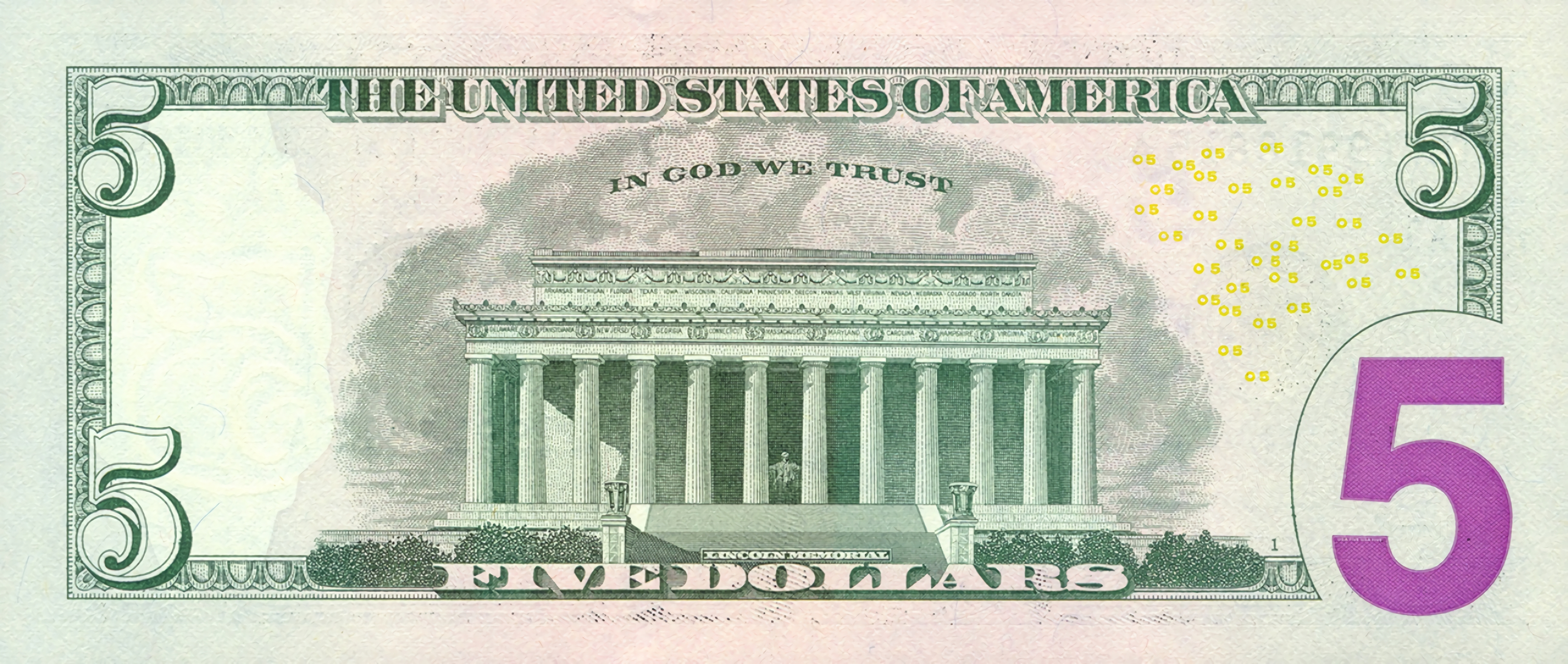
- Design: Lincoln Memorial
- Design date: 2006

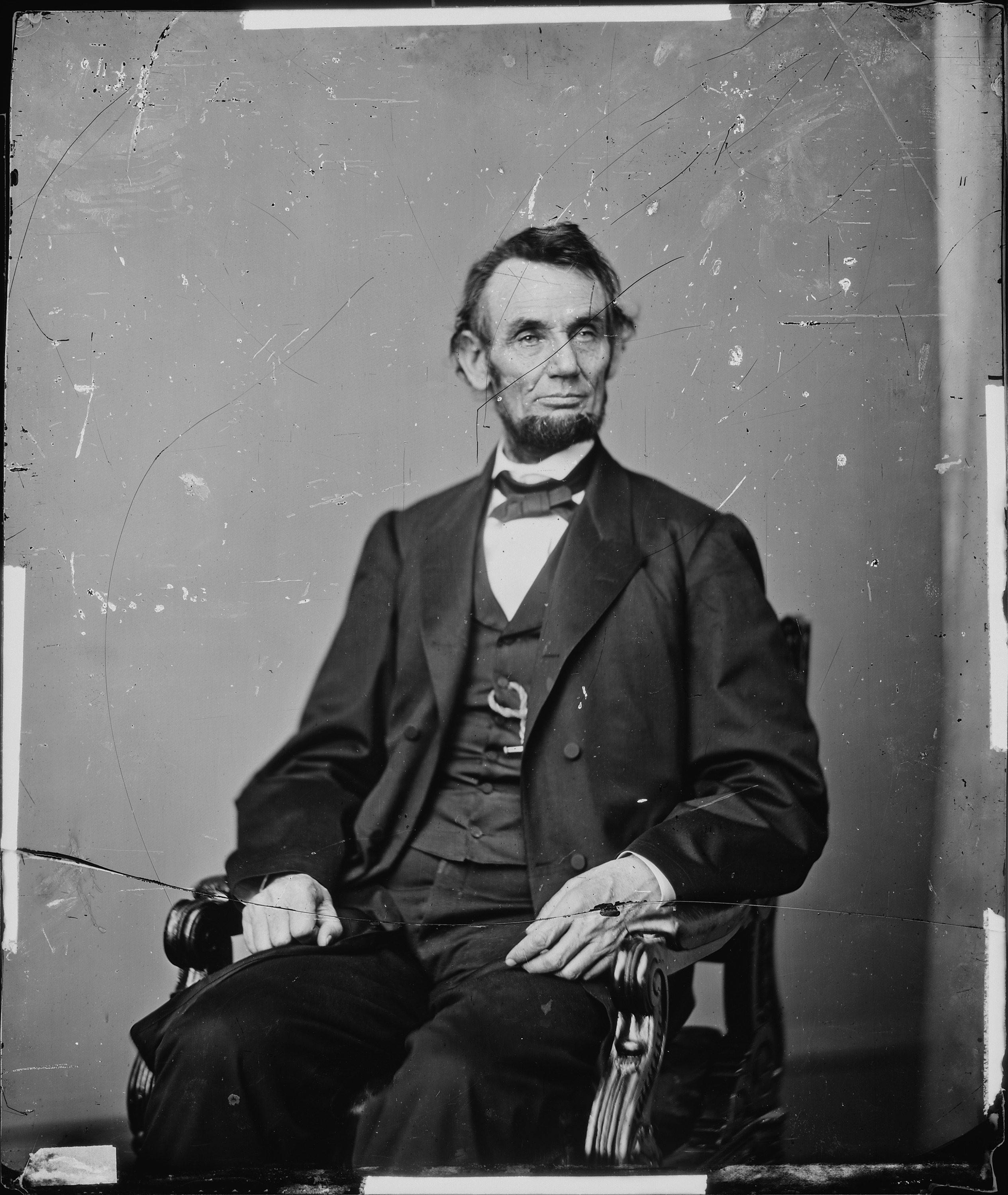
Mathew Brady's February 9, 1864, portrait of Lincoln is used for the current $5 bill (series 1999 issue and later).

The United States five-dollar bill (US$5) is a denomination of United States currency. The latest $5 bill features U.S. president Abraham Lincoln and the coat of arms of United States on the front and the Lincoln Memorial on the back. These $5 bills are Federal Reserve Notes. As of December 2018, the average life of a $5 bill in circulation is 4.7 years before it is replaced due to wear. Approximately 6% of all paper currency produced by the U.S. Treasury's Bureau of Engraving and Printing in 2009 were $5 bills.

The note has been nicknamed a "fin", a term from Yiddish פֿינף (finf), פֿינעף (finef), meaning "five;" this term derived from underworld slang and originally referred to the British five-pound note. It was first recorded being used to refer to the American bill in 1925. It is also occasionally referred to as a “fiver”.

== Current design ==
The redesigned $5 bill was unveiled on September 20, 2007, and was issued on March 13, 2008, during a ceremony at President Lincoln's Cottage.

=== Security features ===
New and enhanced security features make it easier to check the new $5 bill and more difficult for potential counterfeiters to reproduce. The redesigned $5 bill has:

- Watermarks: There are now two watermarks. A large numeral "5" watermark is located in a blank space to the right of the portrait, replacing the watermark portrait of President Lincoln found on previous bills. A second watermark — a new column of three smaller "5"s — has been added and is positioned to the left of the portrait.
- Security thread: The embedded security thread runs vertically and is now located to the right of the portrait. The letters "USA" followed by the number "5" in an alternating pattern are visible along the thread from both sides of the bill. The thread glows blue when held under ultraviolet light (blacklight).
- Microprinting: The redesigned $5 bill features microprinting, which is the engraving of tiny text, on the front of the bill in three areas: the words "FIVE DOLLARS" can be found repeated inside the left and right borders of the bill; the words "E PLURIBUS UNUM" appear at the top of the shield within the Great Seal; and the word "USA" is repeated in between the columns of the shield. On the back of the bill the words "USA FIVE" appear along one edge of the large purple "5". Because they are so small, these microprinted words are hard to replicate.
- Red and Blue Threads: Some small red and blue threads are embedded into the paper to reveal if a higher denomination counterfeit bill has been printed on the bleached paper of a genuine lower denomination bill.

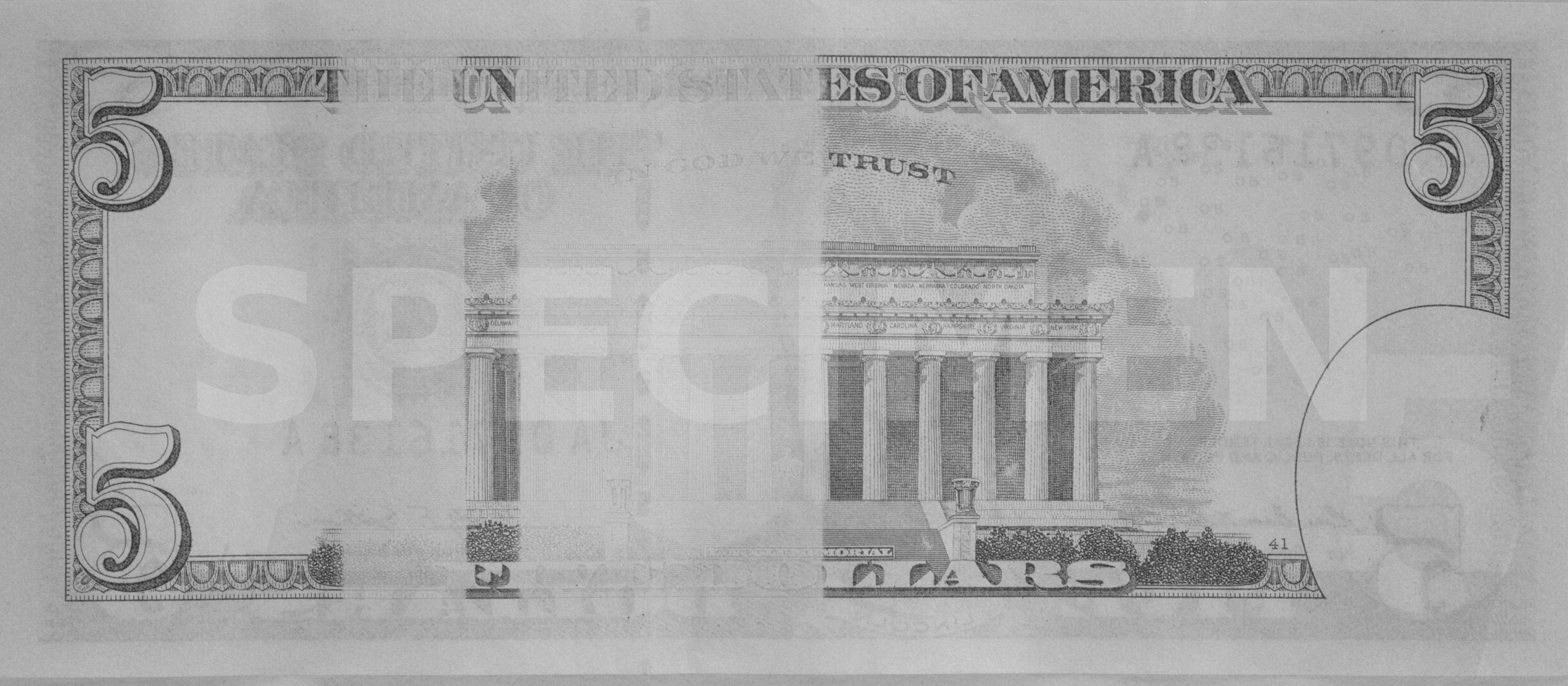
The reverse of the five-dollar bill has two rectangular strips that are blanked out when viewed in the infrared spectrum, as seen in this image taken by an infrared camera.

- Infrared Ink: The back of the five-dollar bill features sections of the bill that are blanked out when viewed in the infrared spectrum. This is consistent with other high-value US bills ($5 and up), which all feature patterns of infrared-visible stripes unique to the given denomination. Bills of other world currencies, such as the Euro, also feature unique patterns visible only when viewed in this spectrum.
- Anti-Photocopy Circle Pattern: Small yellow "05"s are printed to the left of the portrait on the front of the bill and to the right of the Lincoln Memorial vignette on the back. The zeros in the "05"s form a "EURion constellation" to prevent photocopying of the bill. Photocopy machines detect the particular pattern of yellow circles and refuse to make a copy. Some machines make a record of the illegal photocopy attempt, which a repair technician may report to law enforcement.

The five dollar bill lacks the optically variable ink of higher denomination US bills.

=== Design features ===
The new $5 bills remain the same size and use the same—but enhanced—portraits and historical images. The most noticeable difference is the light-purple coloring of the center of the bill, which blends into gray near the edges.

Similar to the recently redesigned $10, $20, $50, and $100 bills, the new $5 bill features an American symbol of freedom printed in the background: The Great Seal of the United States, featuring an eagle and shield, is printed in purple to the right of the portrait and an arc of purple stars surround both it and the portrait.

When the Lincoln Memorial was constructed the names of 48 states were engraved on it. The picture of the Lincoln Memorial on the $5 bill only contains the names of 26 states. These are the states that can be seen on the front side of the Lincoln memorial which is what is pictured on the $5 bill.

On the back of the bill, a larger, purple numeral "5" appears in the lower right corner to help those with visual impairments to distinguish the denomination. This large "5" also includes the words "USA FIVE" in tiny white letters.

The oval borders around President Lincoln's portrait on the front, and the Lincoln Memorial vignette on the back have been removed. Both engravings have been enhanced.

== Proposed redesign ==
On April 20, 2016, Treasury Secretary Jacob Lew announced that the $5, $10, and $20 would all undergo redesign prior to 2020. The changes would add new features to combat counterfeiting and make them easier for blind citizens to distinguish. Lew said that while Lincoln would remain on the obverse, the reverse would be redesigned to depict various historical events that had occurred at the Lincoln Memorial. Among the planned designs are images from Martin Luther King Jr. giving his 1963 speech "I Have a Dream" and the 1939 concert by opera singer Marian Anderson. As of January 2021, the Treasury has continued work on the $20 bill; the redesigns of the $5 and $10 were not mentioned.

== Large size note history ==
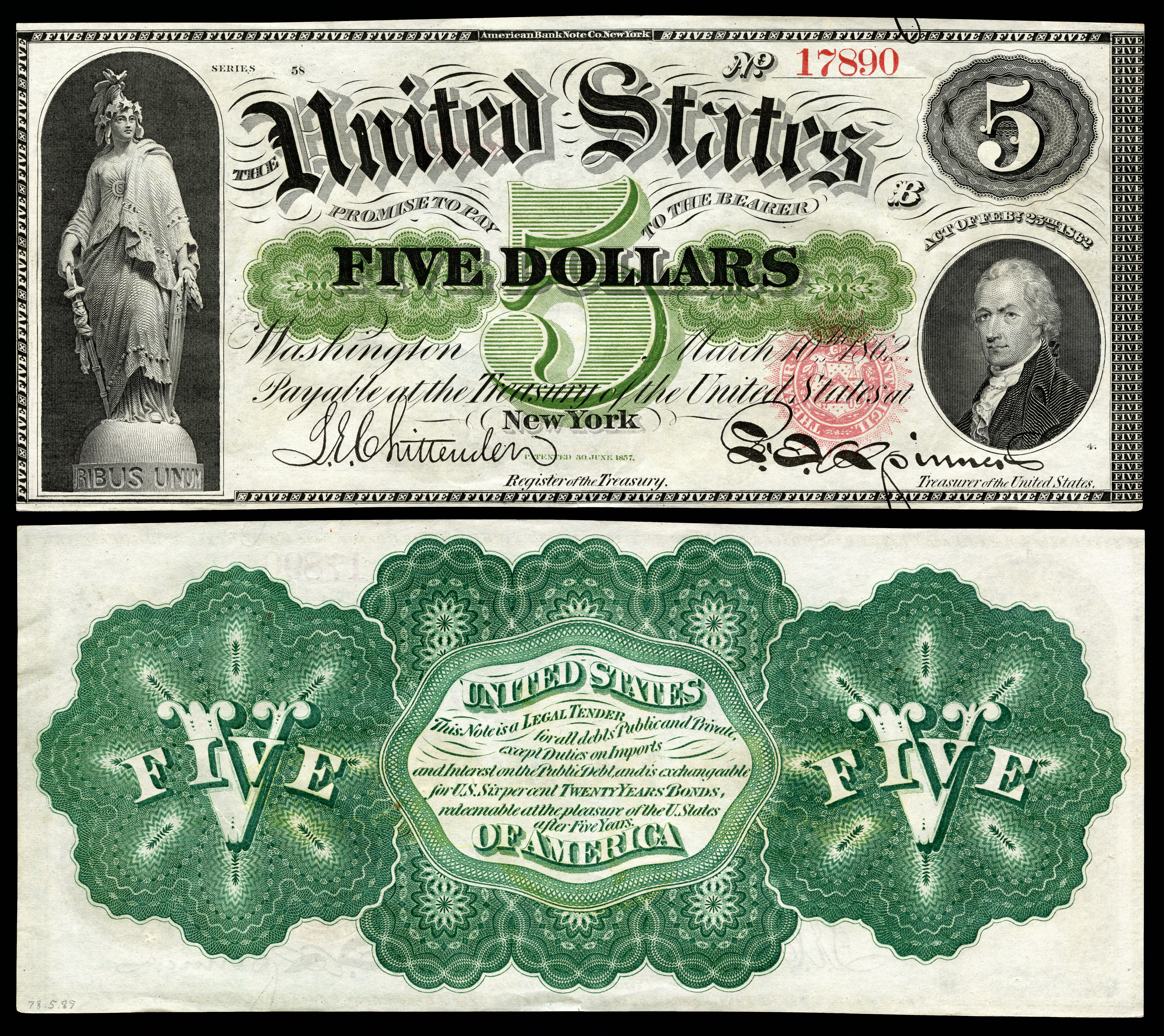
1862 $5 Legal Tender note

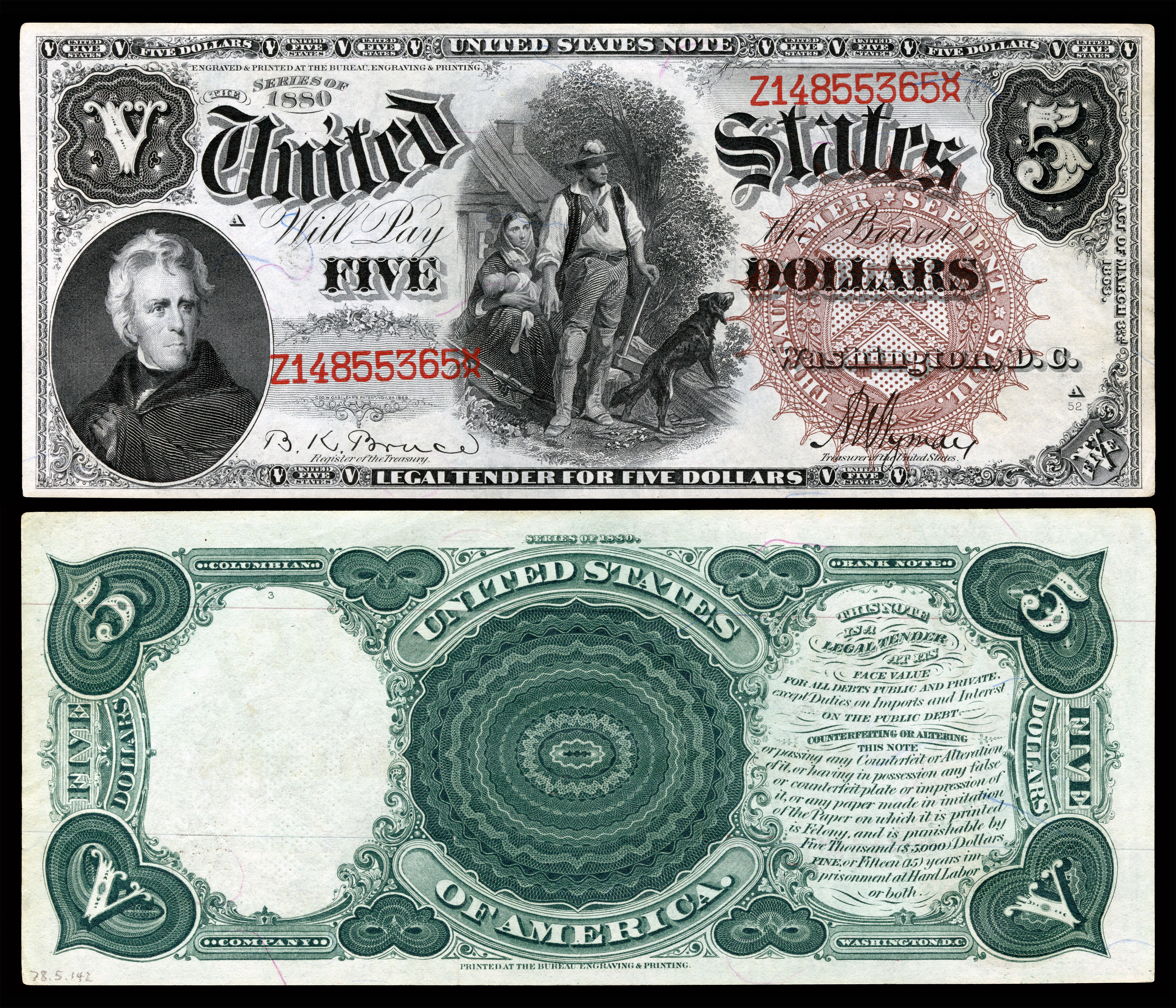
1880 $5 Legal Tender

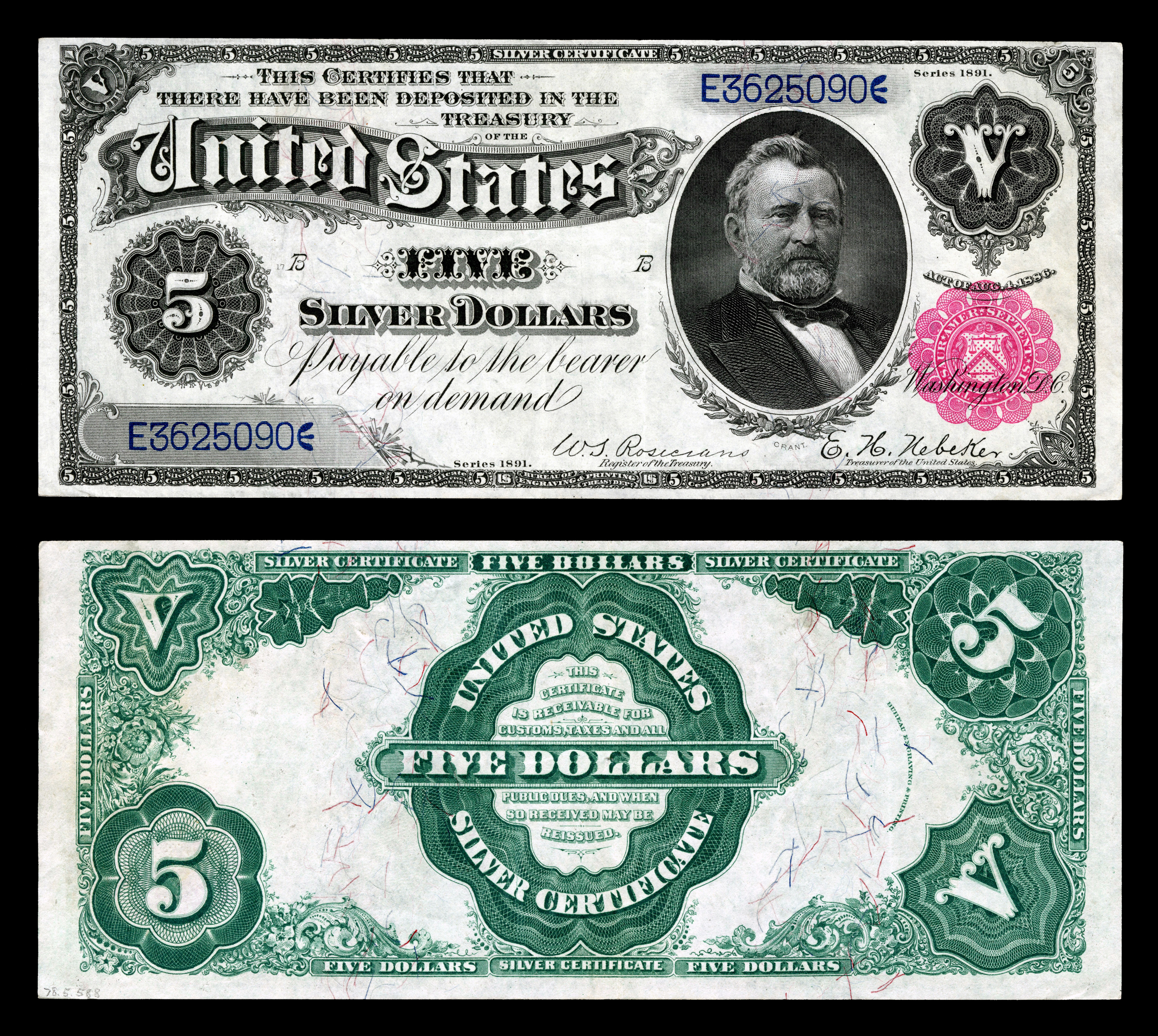
1891 $5 Silver Certificate depicting Ulysses S. Grant

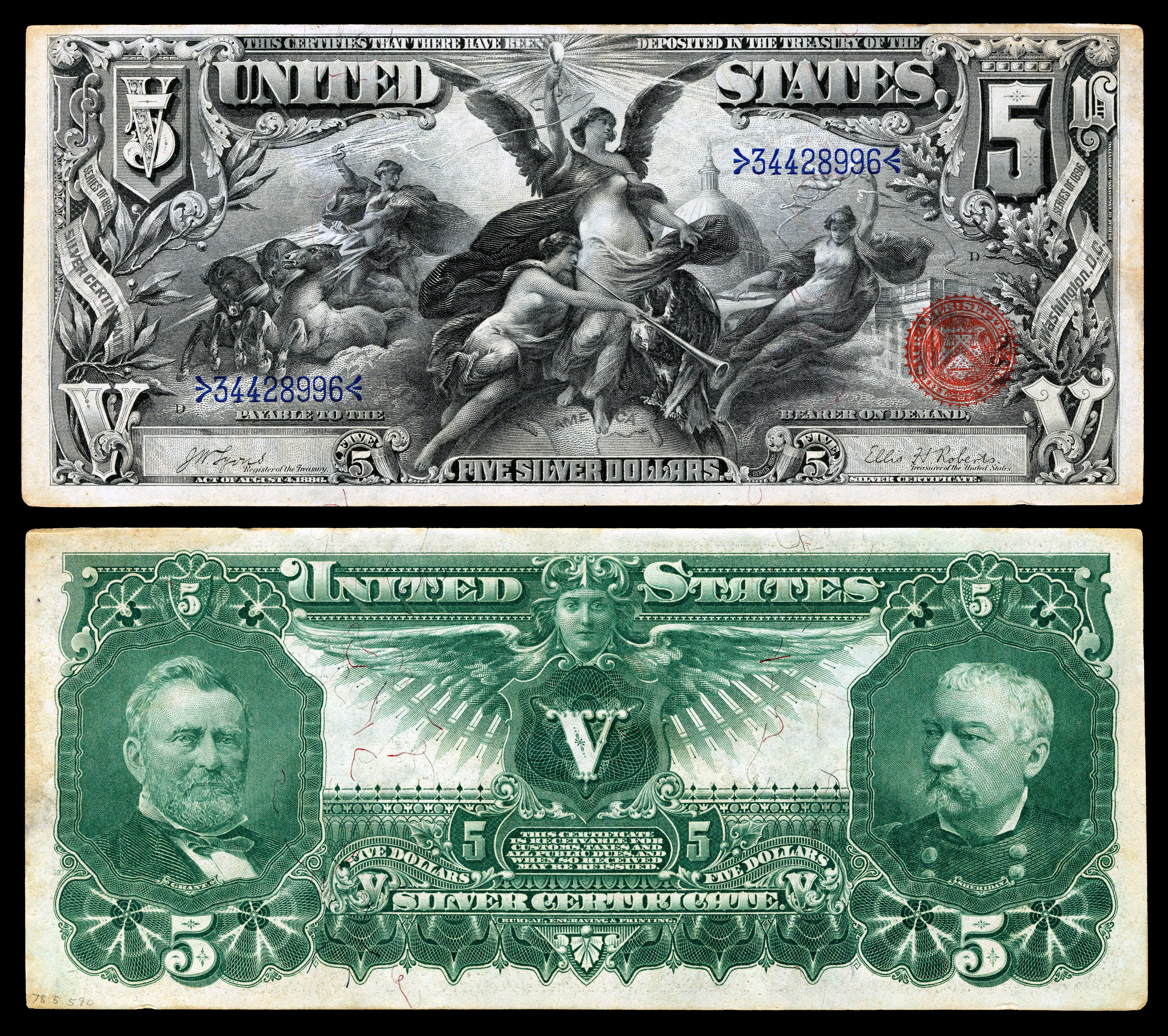
1896 $5 Silver Certificate from the "Educational Series"

(approximately 7.4218 × 3.125 in ≅ 189 × 79 mm)

- 1861: The first $5 bill was issued as a Demand Note with a small portrait of Alexander Hamilton on the right and an allegorical statue representing freedom on the left side of the obverse.
- 1862: The first $5 United States Note was issued with a face design similar to the previous Demand Note and a completely revised reverse.
- 1869: A new $5 United States Note was issued with a small portrait of Andrew Jackson on the left and a vignette of a pioneer family in the middle.
- 1870: National Gold Bank Notes were issued specifically for payment in gold coin by participating banks. The obverse featured vignettes of Christopher Columbus sighting land and Columbus with an Indian Princess; the reverse featured US gold coins.
- 1875: The series 1869 United States Note was revised. The green tinting that was present on the obverse was removed and the design on the reverse was completely changed.
- 1882: A year after James A. Garfield was assassinated, a new National Bank Note with his portrait was issued, also featuring a blue seal. Two different varieties were issued, one with a brown back and another with a green back. The brown back had an image of an eagle on the right, while the green back featured George Washington on the reverse.
- 1886: The first $5 silver certificate was issued with a portrait of Ulysses S. Grant on the obverse and five Morgan silver dollars on the reverse.
- 1890: Five-dollar Treasury or "Coin Notes" were issued and given for government purchases of silver bullion from the silver mining industry. The reverse featured an ornate design that occupied almost the entire note.
- 1891: The reverse of the 1890 Treasury Note was redesigned because the treasury felt that it was too "busy" which would make it too easy to counterfeit.
- 1891: The reverse of the 1886 Silver Certificate was revised; the 5 Morgan silver dollars were removed.
- 1896: The famous "Educational Series" Silver Certificate was issued. The entire obverse was covered with artwork representing electricity and the reverse featured portraits of Ulysses Grant and Phillip Sheridan.
- 1899: 1899 United States five-dollar Silver Certificate (Chief) features a portrait of Running Antelope on the face was issued.
- 1902: Another large size National Banknote was issued and had a portrait of Benjamin Harrison on the obverse. The notes had red or blue seals.
- 1914: The first $5 Federal Reserve Note was issued with a portrait of Lincoln on the obverse and vignettes of Columbus sighting land and the Pilgrims' landing on the reverse. The note initially had a red treasury seal and serial numbers; however, they were changed to blue.
- 1915: Federal Reserve Bank Notes (not to be confused with Federal Reserve Notes) were issued by 5 Federal Reserve Banks. The obverse was similar to the 1914 Federal Reserve Notes, except for large wording in the middle of the bill and a portrait with no border on the left side of the bill. Each note was an obligation of the issuing bank and could only be redeemed at the corresponding bank.
- 1918: The 1915 Federal Reserve Bank Note was re-issued under series 1918 by 11 Federal Reserve banks.
- 1923: The $5 silver certificate was redesigned; it was nicknamed a "porthole" note due to the circular wording of THE UNITED STATES OF AMERICA around Lincoln's portrait. The reverse featured the Great Seal of the United States.

== Small size note history ==
(6.14 × 2.61 in ≅ 156 × 66 mm)

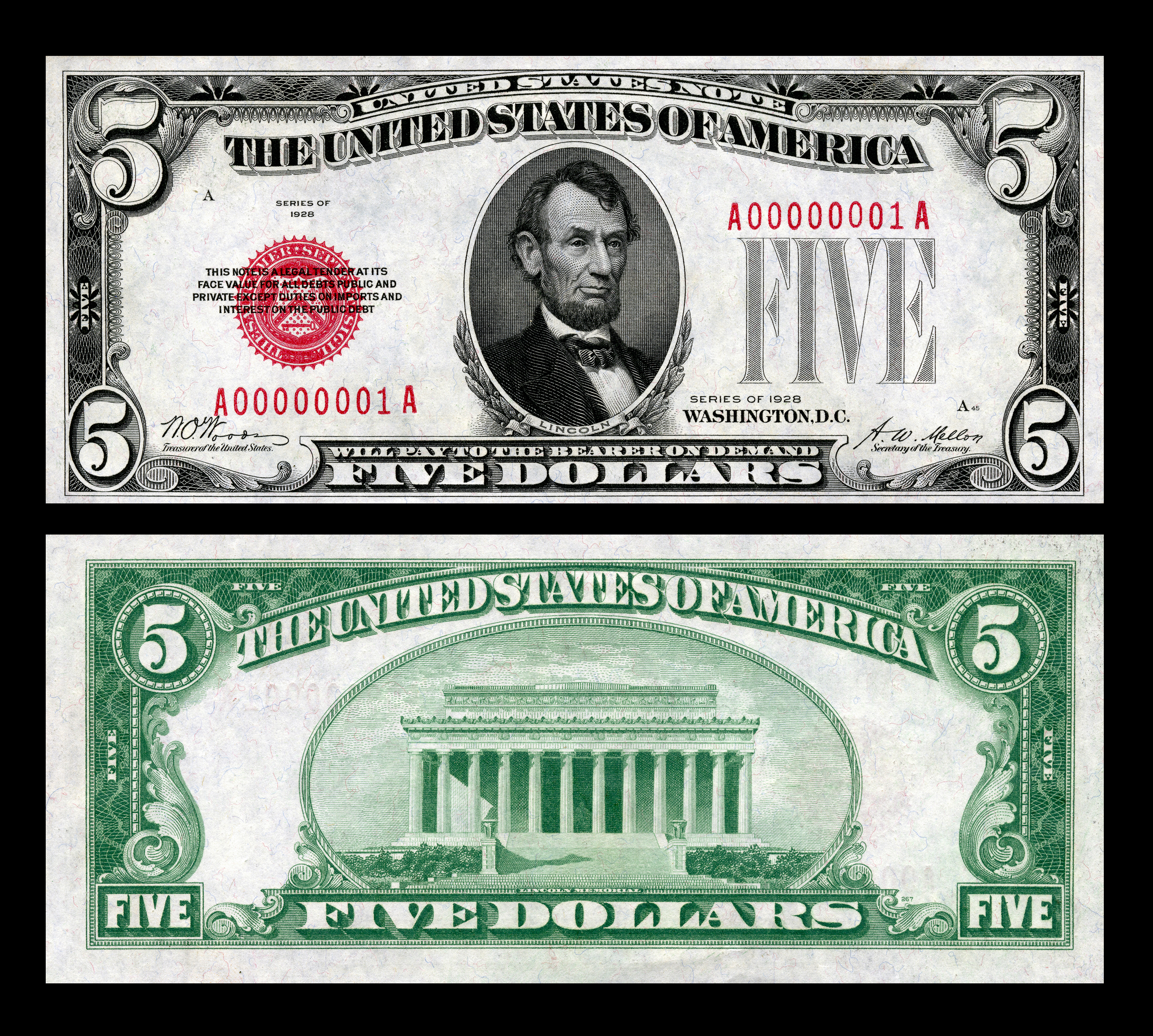
The first small-size $5 United States Note printed (Smithsonian)

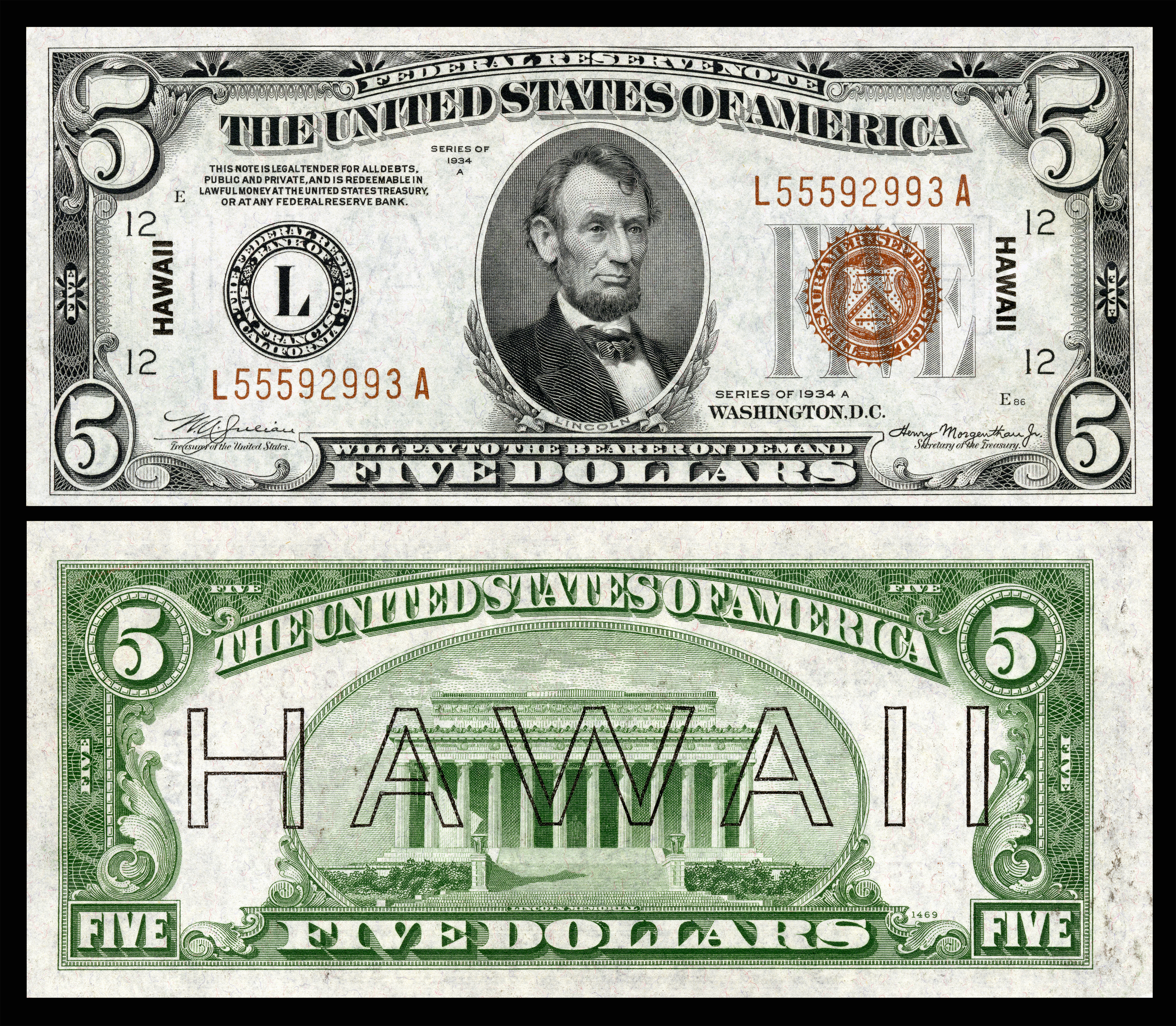
Hawaii overprint note

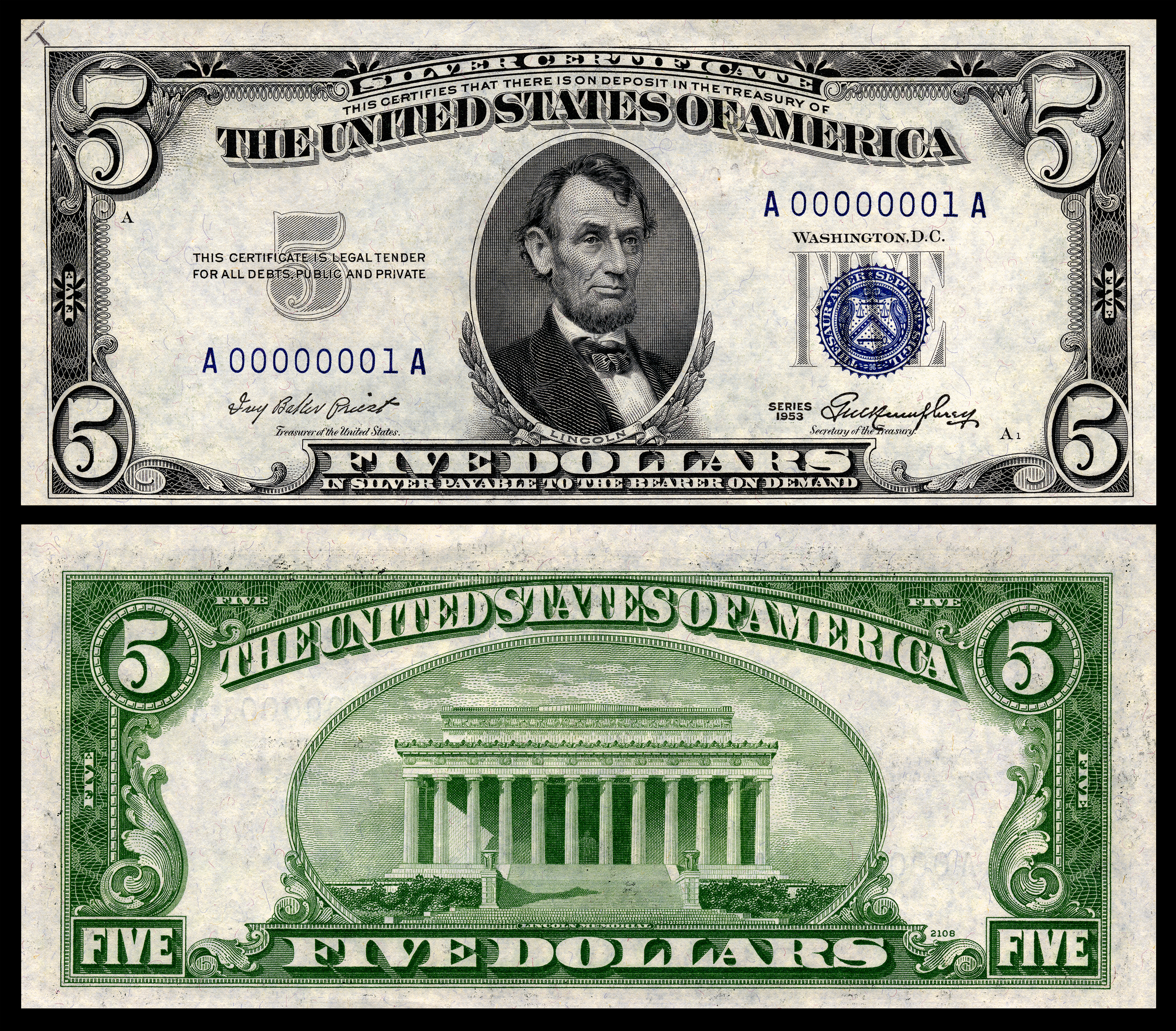
The first 1953 $5 Silver Certificate printed (Smithsonian)

- 1929: Under the Series of 1928, all small-sized notes carried a standardized design. All $5 bills would feature a portrait of Lincoln, the same border design on the obverse, and the Lincoln Memorial on the reverse. The $5 bill was issued as a United States Note with a red seal and serial numbers and as a Federal Reserve Note with a green seal and serial numbers.
- 1933: As an emergency response to the Great Depression, additional money was pumped into the American economy through Federal Reserve Bank Notes. This was the only small-sized $5 bill that had a different border design and featured a brown treasury seal and serial numbers.
- 1934: The redeemable in gold clause was removed from Federal Reserve Notes due to the U.S. withdrawing from the gold standard.
- 1934: The first $5 silver certificates were issued with a blue seal and serial numbers along with a blue numeral 5 on the left side of the obverse.
- 1942: Special World War II currency was issued. HAWAII was overprinted on the front and back of the $5 Federal Reserve Note; the serial numbers, and seal, were changed to brown from green. This was done so that the currency could be declared worthless in the event of a Japanese invasion. A $5 silver certificate with a yellow, rather than blue, treasury seal was printed for use by U.S. troops in North Africa. These notes, too, could be declared worthless if seized by the enemy.
- 1950: Many minor aspects on the obverse of the $5 Federal Reserve Note were changed. Most noticeably, the treasury and Federal Reserve seals and the gray word FIVE, were made smaller.
- 1953: New $5 United States Notes and Silver Certificates were issued with a gray numeral 5 on the left side of the bill and the gray FIVE with a blue seal imprinted over it on the right and blue serial numbers.
- 1963: Both the $5 United States Note and Federal Reserve Note were revised with the motto, IN GOD WE TRUST added to the reverse and WILL PAY TO THE BEARER ON DEMAND removed from the obverse. Also, the obligation on the Federal Reserve Note was shortened to its current wording, THIS NOTE IS LEGAL TENDER FOR ALL DEBTS PUBLIC AND PRIVATE. Also during this time, production of Silver Certificates end, including the $5.
- 1966: Production of the $5 United States Note ends.
- 1969: The $5 bill began using the new treasury seal with wording in English instead of Latin.
- 1992: The first notes at the Western Currency Facility in Fort Worth, Texas begin printing in July, during production of Series 1988A.
- 1994: Series 1993 $5 notes received new-age anti-counterfeiting measures, featuring microscopic printing around Lincoln's portrait and a plastic security strip on the left side of the bill.
- May 24, 2000: To combat evolving counterfeiting, a new $5 note, the first complete redesign since 1929, was issued as Series 1999 whose design was similar in style to the $100, $50, $20, and $10 bills that had all undergone previous design changes. The $5 bill, however, does not feature color-shifting ink like the higher denominations. The first notes were printed in December, 1999.
- June 28, 2006: The BEP announced plans to redesign the $5 note, likely with similar features as newer $10, $20, and $50 notes.
- September 20, 2007: The BEP revealed the redesigned $5 note to the public.
- October 2007: The first redesigned $5 notes are printed.
- March 13, 2008: The redesigned $5 note enters circulation.

=== Series dates ===
==== Small size ====
Type	Series	Register	Treasurer	Seal
National Bank Note Types 1 & 2	1929	Jones	Woods	Brown
Federal Reserve Bank Note	1929	Jones	Woods	Brown

Type	Series	Treasurer	Secretary	Seal
Legal Tender Note	1928	Woods	Mellon	Red
Legal Tender Note	1928A	Woods	Mills	Red
Legal Tender Note	1928B	Julian	Morgenthau	Red
Legal Tender Note	1928C	Julian	Morgenthau	Red
Legal Tender Note	1928D	Julian	Vinson	Red
Legal Tender Note	1928E	Julian	Snyder	Red
Legal Tender Note	1928F	Clark	Snyder	Red
Legal Tender Note	1953	Priest	Humphrey	Red
Legal Tender Note	1953A	Priest	Anderson	Red
Legal Tender Note	1953B	Smith	Dillon	Red
Legal Tender Note	1953C	Granahan	Dillon	Red
Legal Tender Note	1963	Granahan	Dillon	Red
Silver Certificate	1934	Julian	Morgenthau	Blue
Silver Certificate	1934A	Julian	Morgenthau	Blue
Silver Certificate	1934A North Africa	Julian	Morgenthau	Yellow
Silver Certificate	1934B	Julian	Vinson	Blue
Silver Certificate	1934C	Julian	Snyder	Blue
Silver Certificate	1934D	Clark	Snyder	Blue
Silver Certificate	1953	Priest	Humphrey	Blue
Silver Certificate	1953A	Priest	Anderson	Blue
Silver Certificate	1953B	Smith	Dillon	Blue
Federal Reserve Note	1928	Tate	Mellon	Green
Federal Reserve Note	1928A	Woods	Mellon	Green
Federal Reserve Note	1928B	Woods	Mellon	Green
Federal Reserve Note	1928C	Woods	Mills	Green
Federal Reserve Note	1928D	Woods	Woodin	Green
Federal Reserve Note	1934	Julian	Morgenthau	Green
Federal Reserve Note	1934 Hawaii	Julian	Morgenthau	Brown
Federal Reserve Note	1934A	Julian	Morgenthau	Green
Federal Reserve Note	1934A Hawaii	Julian	Morgenthau	Brown
Federal Reserve Note	1934B	Julian	Vinson	Green
Federal Reserve Note	1934C	Julian	Snyder	Green
Federal Reserve Note	1934D	Clark	Snyder	Green
Federal Reserve Note	1950	Clark	Snyder	Green
Federal Reserve Note	1950A	Priest	Humphrey	Green
Federal Reserve Note	1950B	Priest	Anderson	Green
Federal Reserve Note	1950C	Smith	Dillon	Green
Federal Reserve Note	1950D	Granahan	Dillon	Green
Federal Reserve Note	1950E	Granahan	Fowler	Green
Federal Reserve Note	1963	Granahan	Dillon	Green
Federal Reserve Note	1963A	Granahan	Fowler	Green
Federal Reserve Note	1969	Elston	Kennedy	Green
Federal Reserve Note	1969A	Kabis	Connally	Green
Federal Reserve Note	1969B	Bañuelos	Connally	Green
Federal Reserve Note	1969C	Bañuelos	Shultz	Green
Federal Reserve Note	1974	Neff	Simon	Green
Federal Reserve Note	1977	Morton	Blumenthal	Green
Federal Reserve Note	1977A	Morton	Miller	Green
Federal Reserve Note	1981	Buchanan	Regan	Green
Federal Reserve Note	1981A	Ortega	Regan	Green
Federal Reserve Note	1985	Ortega	Baker	Green
Federal Reserve Note	1988	Ortega	Brady	Green
Federal Reserve Note	1988A	Villalpando	Brady	Green
Federal Reserve Note	1993	Withrow	Bentsen	Green
Federal Reserve Note	1995	Withrow	Rubin	Green
Federal Reserve Note	1999	Withrow	Summers	Green
Federal Reserve Note	2001	Marin	O'Neill	Green
Federal Reserve Note	2003	Marin	Snow	Green
Federal Reserve Note	2003A	Cabral	Snow	Green
Federal Reserve Note	2006 Old (H Series)	Cabral	Paulson	Green
Federal Reserve Note	2006 New (I Series)	Cabral	Paulson	Green
Federal Reserve Note	2009	Rios	Geithner	Green
Federal Reserve Note	2013	Rios	Lew	Green
Federal Reserve Note	2017A	Carranza	Mnuchin	Green
Federal Reserve Note	2021	Malerba	Yellen	Green

== See also ==
- Where's George?
