= United States fifty-dollar bill =

Current denomination of United States currency

Fifty dollars
- Country: United States of America
- Value: $50
- Width: 156 mm
- Height: 66.3 mm
- Weight: Approx. 1.0 g
- Security features: Security fibers, watermark, security thread, color shifting ink, micro printing, raised printing, EURion constellation
- Material used: 75% cotton 25% linen
- Years of printing: 1861–present

Obverse
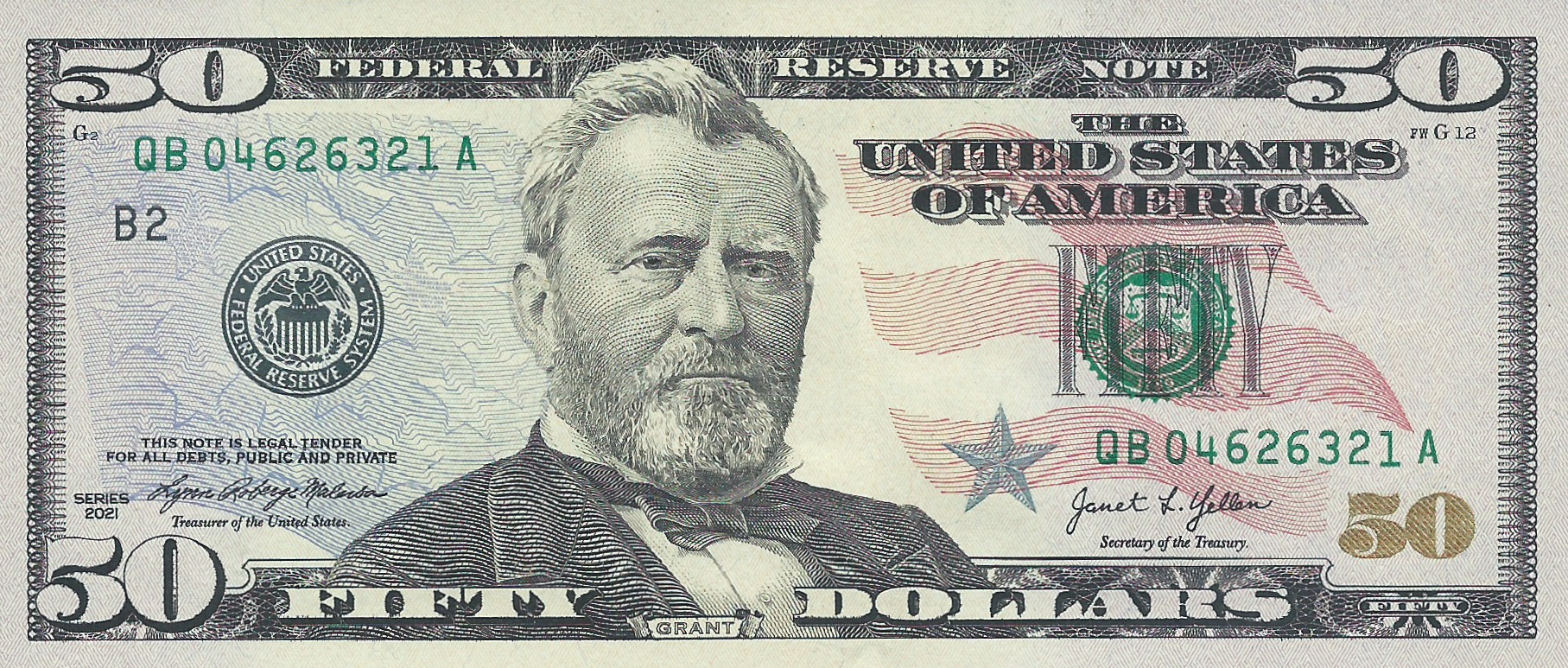
- Design: Ulysses S. Grant
- Design date: 2004

Reverse
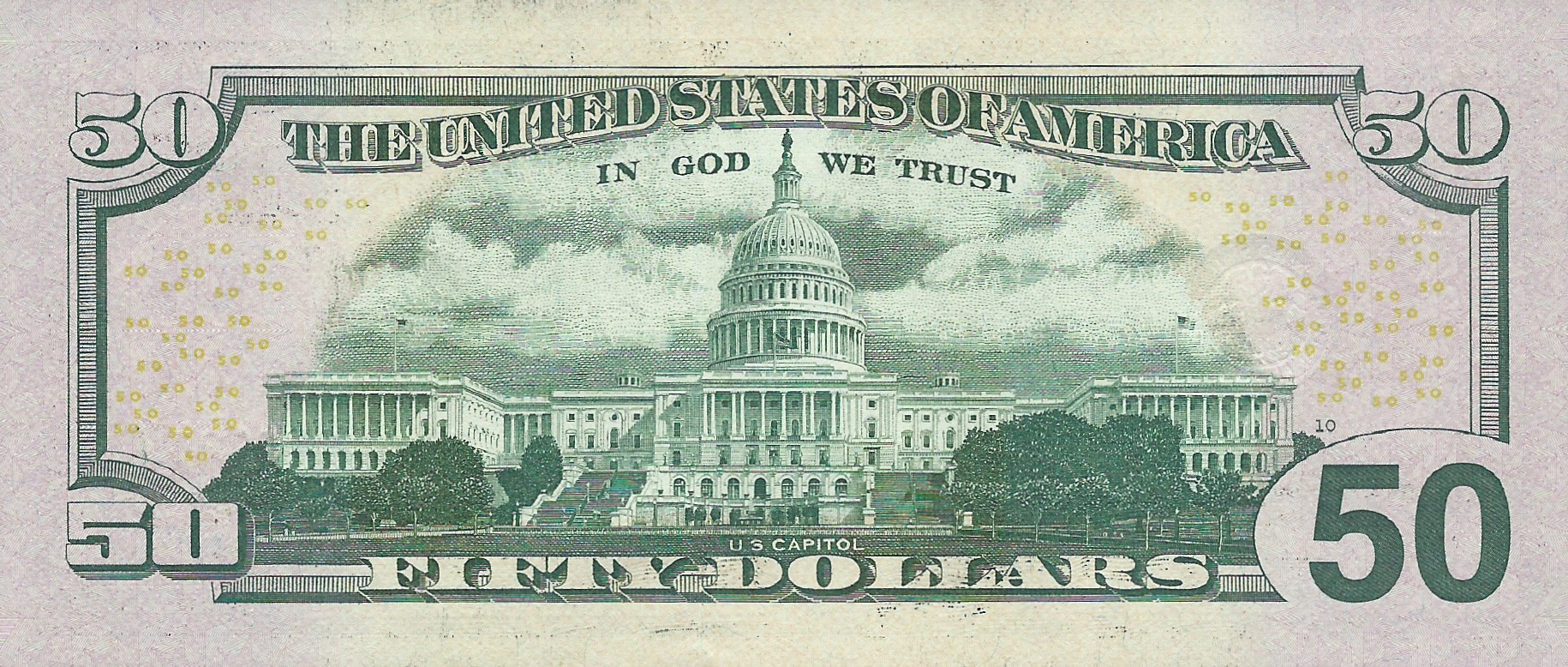
- Design: United States Capitol
- Design date: 2004

The United States fifty-dollar bill (US$50) is a denomination of United States currency. The obverse features American Civil War general and 18th U.S. president (1869–1877) Ulysses S. Grant, while the U.S. Capitol is featured on the reverse. All current-issue $50 bills are Federal Reserve Notes.

As of December 2018, the average life of a $50 bill in circulation is 12.2 years before it is replaced due to wear. Approximately 3.5% of all notes printed in 2019 were $50 bills. They are delivered by Federal Reserve Banks in beige straps. The fifty-dollar bill has amongst the lowest circulation of any U.S. denomination measured by volume, with 1.8 billion notes in circulation as of December 31, 2019.

== History ==
=== Large size notes ===
(approximately 7.4218 × 3.125 in ≅ 189 × 79 mm)

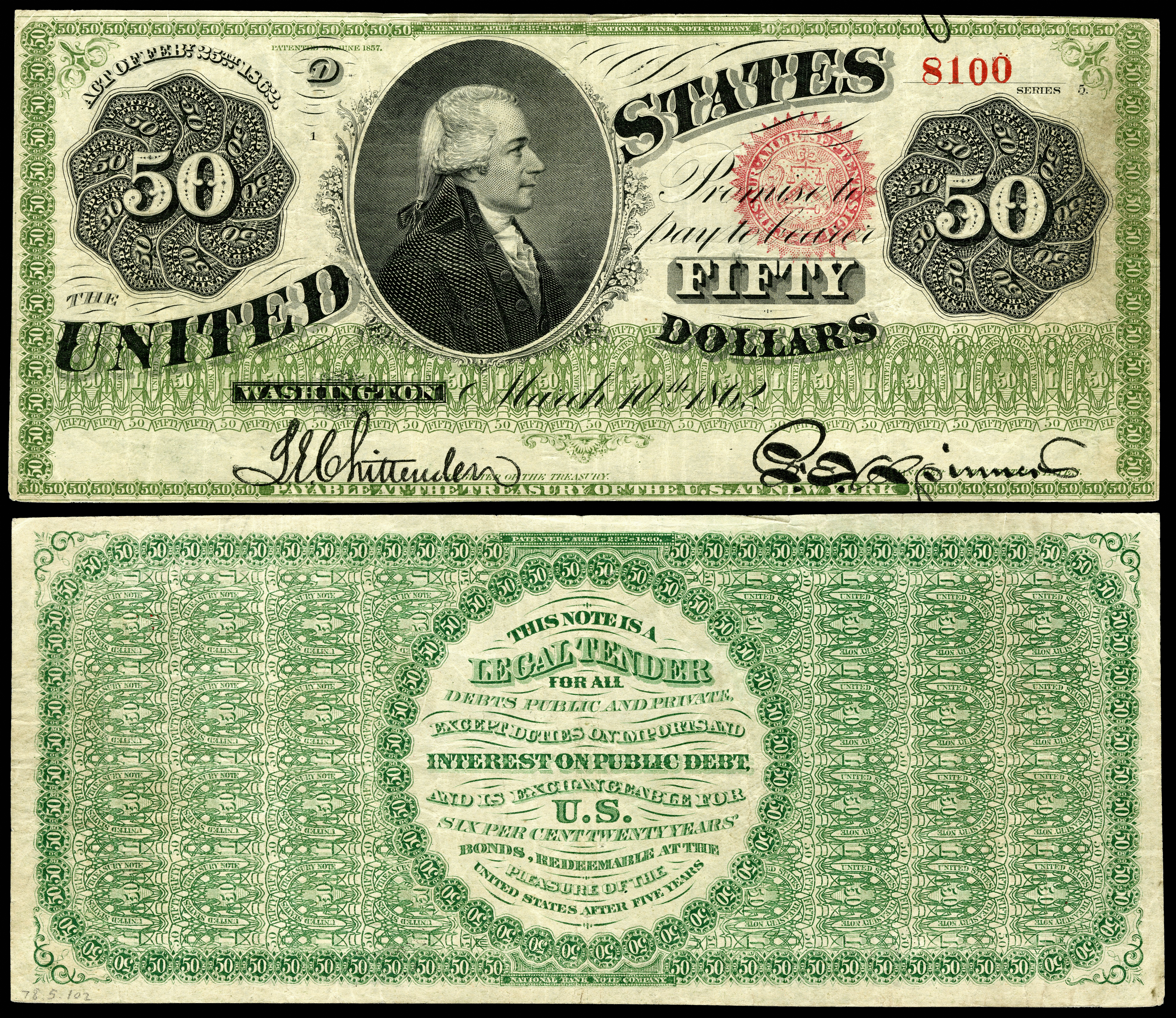
1862 $50 Legal Tender note featuring Alexander Hamilton

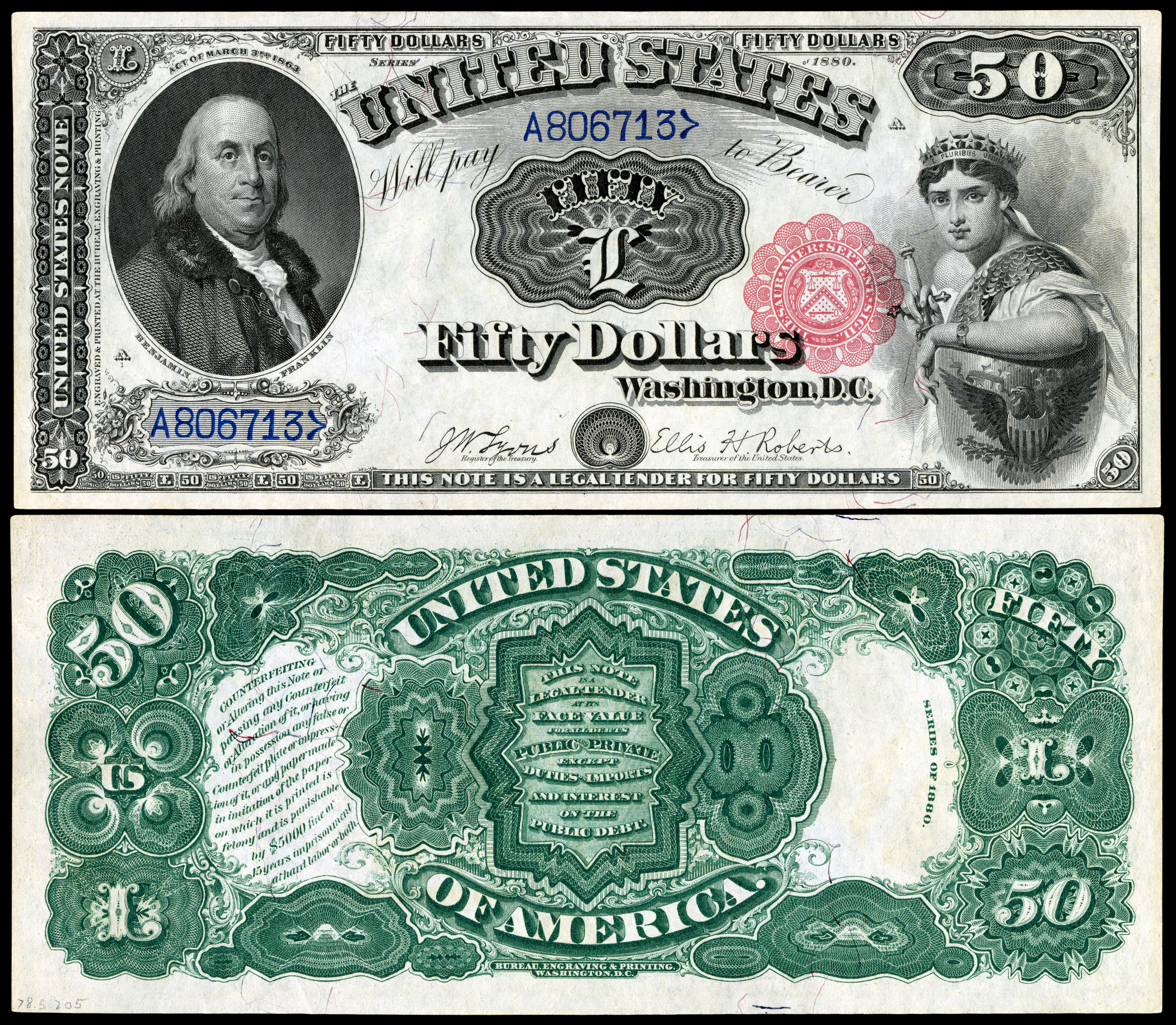
1880 $50 Legal Tender, depicting Benjamin Franklin

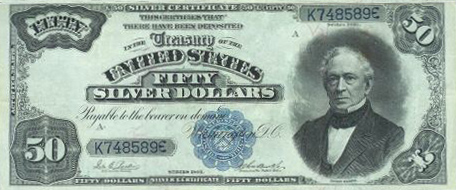
1891 Silver Certificate

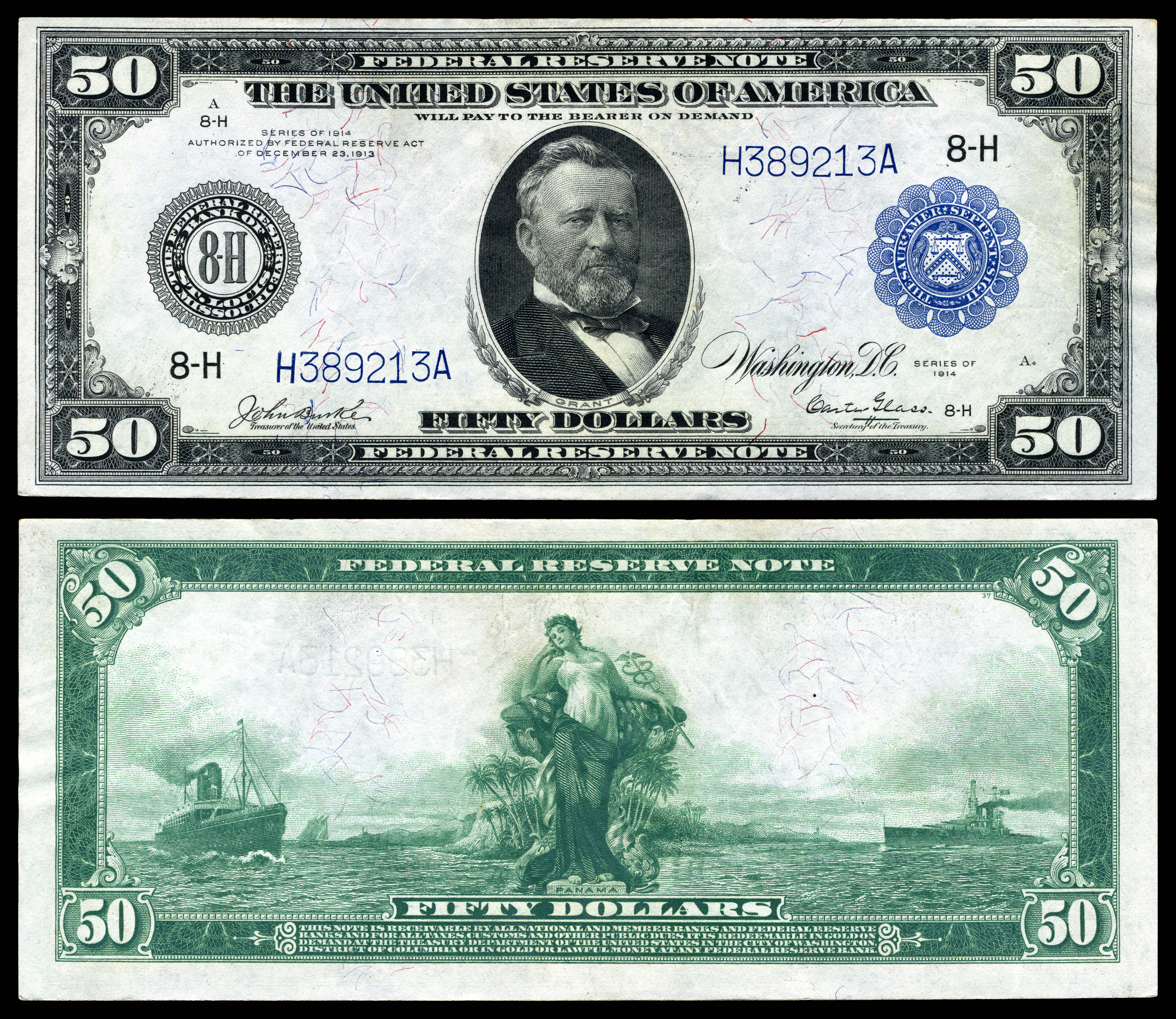
1914 Federal Reserve Note

- 1861: Three-year $50 Interest Bearing Notes were issued that paid a cent of interest per day, and thus 7.3% annually — the so-called seven-thirties. These notes were not primarily designed to circulate and were payable to the original purchaser of the dollar bill. The obverse of the note featured a bald eagle.
- 1862: The first circulating $50 bill was issued.
- 1863: Both one and two-year Interest Bearing Notes were issued that paid 5% interest. The one-year Interest Bearing Notes featured a vignette of Alexander Hamilton to the left and an allegorical figure representing loyalty to the right. The two-year notes featured allegorical figures of loyalty and justice.
- 1864: Compound Interest Treasury Notes were issued, intended to circulate for three years and paying 6% interest compounded semi-annually. The obverse is similar to the Series of 1863 one-year Interest Bearing Note.
- 1865: Three-year Interest Bearing Notes were issued again with a slightly different bald eagle and border design on the obverse.
- 1869: A new $50 United States Note was issued with a portrait of Henry Clay on the right and an allegorical figure holding a laurel branch on the left of the obverse.
- 1870: $50 National Gold Bank Notes were issued specifically for payment in gold coin by 2 national gold banks. The obverse featured vignettes of George Washington crossing the Delaware River and at Valley Forge; the reverse featured a vignette of U.S. gold coins.
- 1874: Another new $50 United States Note was issued with a portrait of Benjamin Franklin on the left and allegorical figure of the goddess of Liberty on the right of the obverse.
- 1878: The first $50 silver certificate was issued with a portrait of Edward Everett. The reverse was printed in black ink.
- 1880: The Series of 1878 Silver Certificate was slightly revised.
- 1882: The first $50 gold certificate with a portrait of Silas Wright was issued. The reverse was printed in orange ink and featured a bald eagle perched atop an American flag.
- 1891: The obverse of the $50 Silver Certificate was slightly revised and the reverse was completely changed.
- 1891: The $50 Treasury or "Coin Note" was issued and given for government purchases of silver bullion from the silver mining industry. The note featured a portrait of William H. Seward.
- 1913: A new $50 gold certificate with a portrait of Ulysses Grant was issued. The style of the area below Grant's portrait was later used on small-sized notes.
- 1914: The first $50 Federal Reserve Note was issued with a portrait of Ulysses Grant on the obverse and an allegorical figure of Panama between a merchant and battle ship on the reverse.
- 1918: Federal Reserve Bank Notes (not to be confused with Federal Reserve Notes) were issued by the Federal Reserve Bank of St. Louis. The obverse was similar to the 1914 Federal Reserve Notes, except for large wording in the center of the note and a borderless portrait on the left side. The note was an obligation of the St. Louis Federal Reserve Bank and could only be redeemed there.
- 1922: last $50 large size note was issued, a Gold Certificate. Reverse identical to 1913 issue; obverse has modified text.

=== Small size notes ===
(6.14 × 2.61 in ≅ 156 × 66 mm)

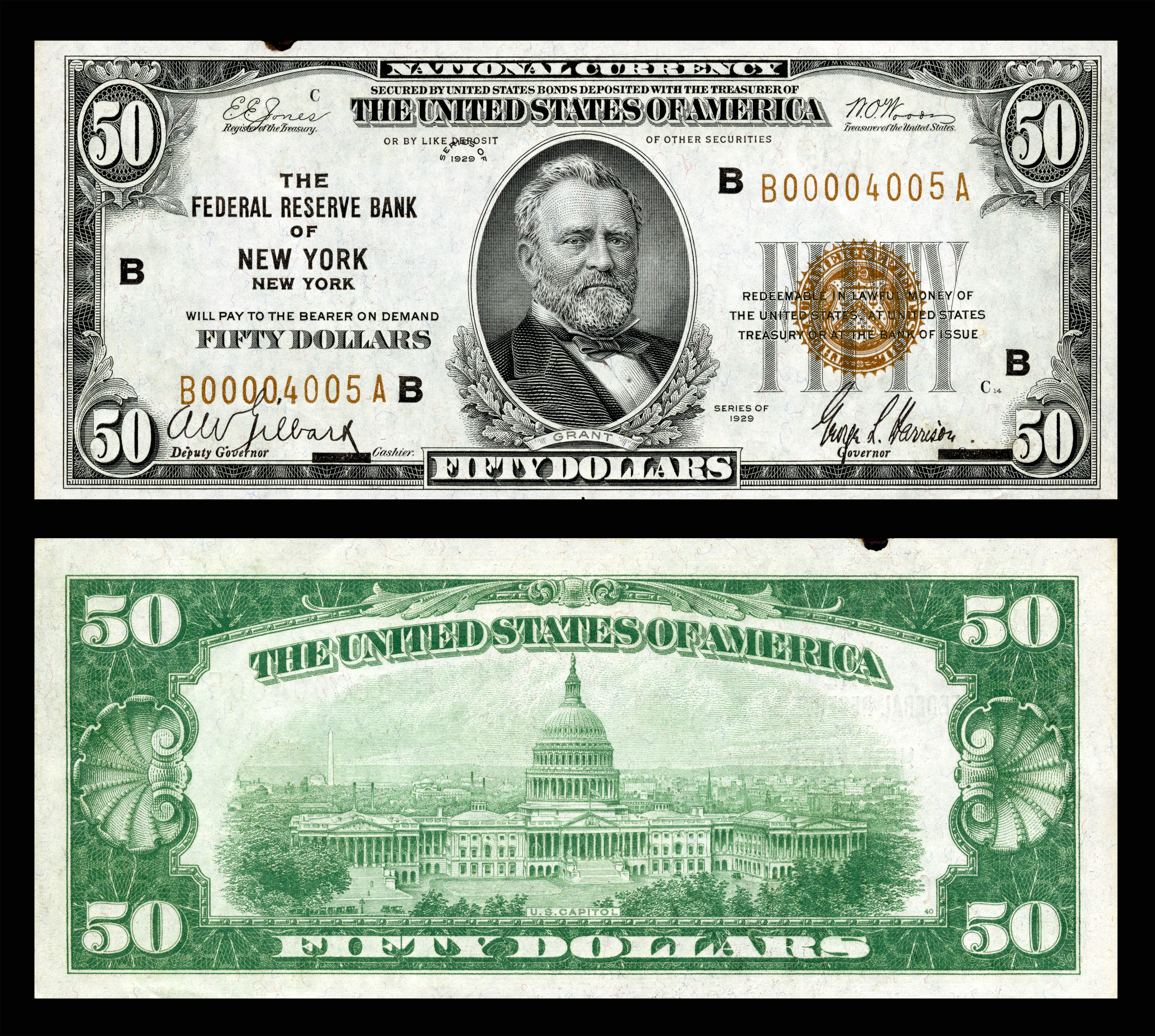
Series of 1929 Federal Reserve Bank Note.

- 1928: Under the Series of 1928, all U.S. currency was changed to its current size. All variations of the $50 bill would carry the same portrait of Ulysses S. Grant, same border design on the obverse, and the same reverse with a vignette of the U.S. Capitol showing the east front. The $50 bill was issued as a Federal Reserve Note with a green seal and serial numbers and as a gold certificate with a golden seal and serial numbers.
- 1933: As an emergency response to the Great Depression, additional money was pumped into the American economy through Federal Reserve Bank Notes issued under Series of 1929. This was the only small-sized $50 bill that had a different border design on the obverse. The serial numbers and seal were brown.
- 1934: The redeemable in gold clause was removed from Federal Reserve Notes due to the U.S. withdrawing from the gold standard.
- 1950: Many minor aspects on the obverse of the $50 Federal Reserve Note were changed. Most noticeably, the treasury seal, gray word FIFTY, and the Federal Reserve Seal were made smaller; also, the Federal Reserve seal had spikes added around the perimeter, like the Treasury seal.
- 1966: WILL PAY TO THE BEARER ON DEMAND was removed from the obverse and IN GOD WE TRUST was added to the reverse of the $50 Federal Reserve Note beginning with Series 1963A. Also, the obligation was shortened to its current wording, THIS NOTE IS LEGAL TENDER FOR ALL DEBTS PUBLIC AND PRIVATE.
- 1969: The $50 bill began using the new treasury seal with wording in English instead of Latin.
- 1991: The first new-age anti-counterfeiting measures were introduced under Series 1990 with microscopic printing around Grant's portrait and a plastic security strip on the left side of the bill. The first Series 1990 notes were printed in November, 1991.
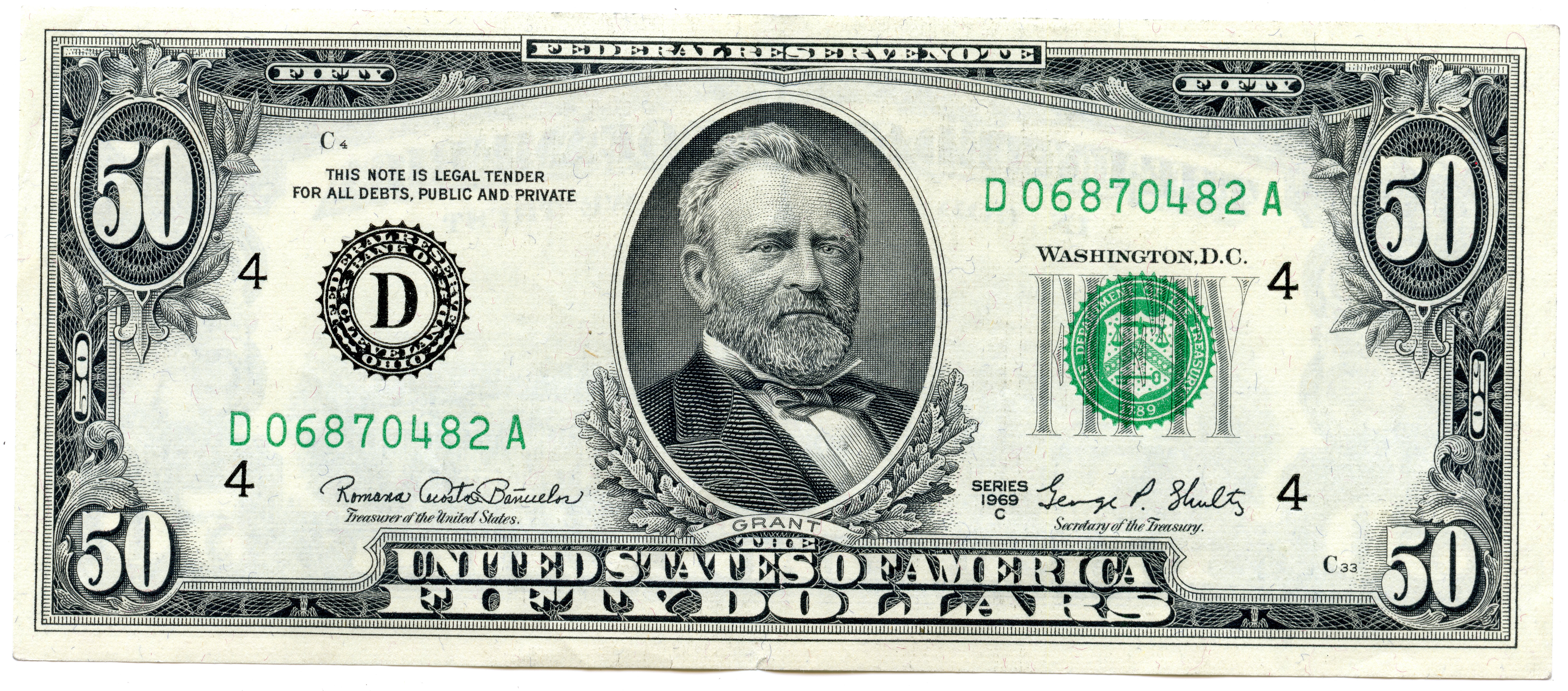
- series 1969C obverse
  October 27, 1997: The first major redesign of the $50 note since 1929 was implemented as Series 1996 to further deter counterfeiters. Included were an enlarged and off-center portrait of Grant, an enlarged and updated view of the U.S. Capitol now showing the west front on the reverse, a security thread which glows yellow under ultraviolet light, a numeric 50 which shifts color from black to green when tilted, and a watermark of Grant. Also, for those with vision limitations, a large dark 50 was added to the bottom right corner of the reverse. The Federal Reserve seal with the district letter was changed to a unified Federal Reserve System seal and an additional prefix letter was added to the beginning of the bill's serial number. These redesigned $50 notes were first printed in July, 1997.
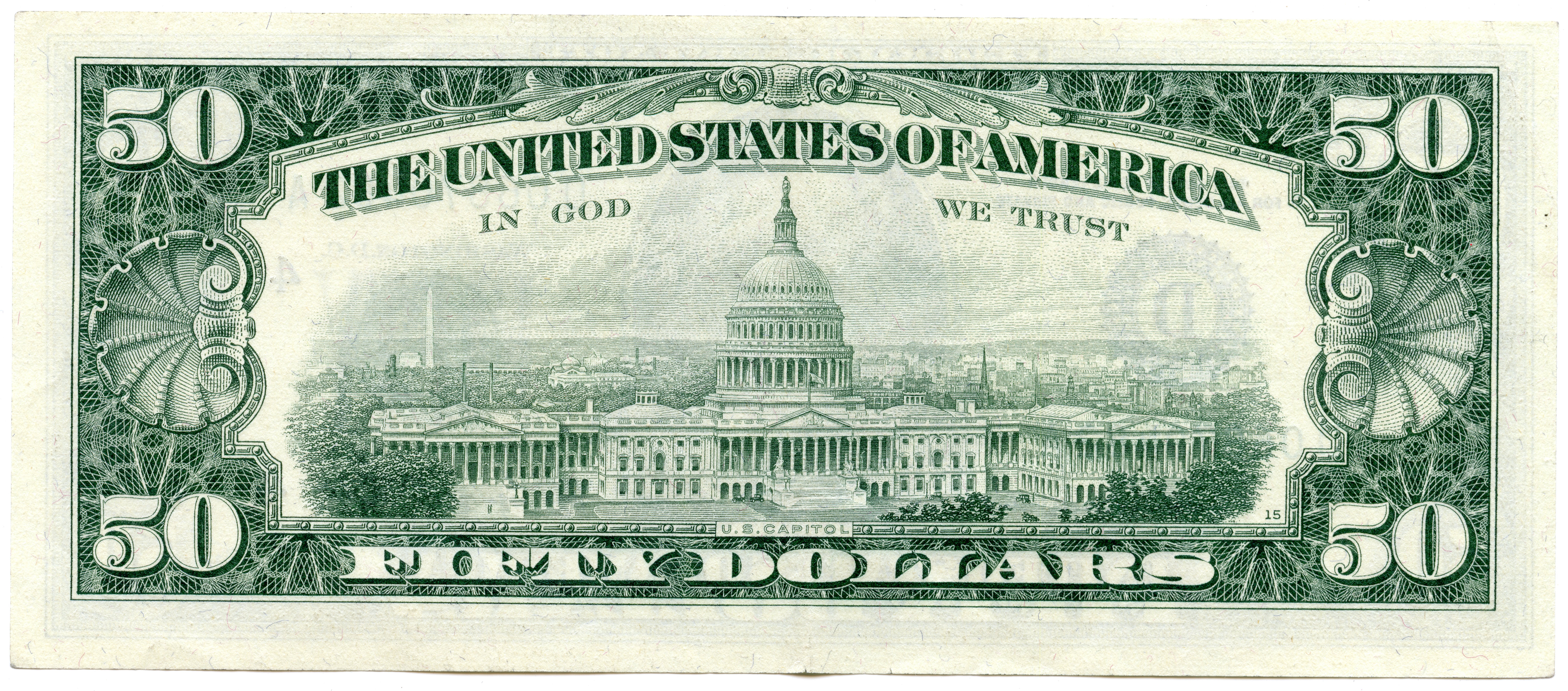
- series 1969C reverse
  September 28, 2004: A revised design of the $50 note was implemented, as Series 2004, with the first use of multiple colors since the 1905 $20 gold certificate. Around the new borderless portrait of President Grant appears a subtle, stylized blue and red background image of the American Flag. A small silver-blue star was also added to the lower right of Grant's portrait. All previous Series 1996 security features were included, although the color-shifting numeric 50 now shifts from copper to green. The oval border and fine lines surrounding the U.S. Capitol on the reverse have been removed and replaced with sky and clouds. The new design also seems to have the "EURion constellation" on the back to prevent photocopying of the bill. The 2004 bills have the signature combination of Marin-Snow. The first printing of these redesigned $50 notes was in March, 2004. This marked the first notes printed at the Western Currency Facility in Fort Worth, Texas; all $50 notes have been printed there since.

=== Series dates ===
==== Small size ====
Type	Series	Register	Treasurer	Seal
National Bank Note Types 1 & 2	1929	Jones	Woods	Brown
Federal Reserve Bank Note	1928A	Jones	Woods	Brown

Type	Series	Treasurer	Secretary	Seal
Gold Certificate	1928	Woods	Mellon	Gold
Federal Reserve Note	1928	Woods	Mellon	Green
Federal Reserve Note	1928A	Woods	Mellon	Green
Federal Reserve Note	1934	Julian	Morgenthau	Green
Federal Reserve Note	1934A	Julian	Morgenthau	Green
Federal Reserve Note	1934B	Julian	Vinson	Green
Federal Reserve Note	1934C	Julian	Snyder	Green
Federal Reserve Note	1934D	Clark	Snyder	Green
Federal Reserve Note	1950	Clark	Snyder	Green
Federal Reserve Note	1950A	Priest	Humphrey	Green
Federal Reserve Note	1950B	Priest	Anderson	Green
Federal Reserve Note	1950C	Smith	Dillon	Green
Federal Reserve Note	1950D	Granahan	Dillon	Green
Federal Reserve Note	1950E	Granahan	Fowler	Green
Federal Reserve Note	1963A	Granahan	Fowler	Green
Federal Reserve Note	1969	Elston	Kennedy	Green
Federal Reserve Note	1969A	Kabis	Connally	Green
Federal Reserve Note	1969B	Bañuelos	Connally	Green
Federal Reserve Note	1969C	Bañuelos	Shultz	Green
Federal Reserve Note	1974	Neff	Simon	Green
Federal Reserve Note	1977	Morton	Blumenthal	Green
Federal Reserve Note	1981	Buchanan	Regan	Green
Federal Reserve Note	1981A	Ortega	Regan	Green
Federal Reserve Note	1985	Ortega	Baker	Green
Federal Reserve Note	1988	Ortega	Brady	Green
Federal Reserve Note	1990	Villalpando	Brady	Green
Federal Reserve Note	1993	Withrow	Bentsen	Green
Federal Reserve Note	1996	Withrow	Rubin	Green
Federal Reserve Note	2001	Marin	O'Neill	Green
Federal Reserve Note	2004	Marin	Snow	Green
Federal Reserve Note	2004A	Cabral	Snow	Green
Federal Reserve Note	2006	Cabral	Paulson	Green
Federal Reserve Note	2009	Rios	Geithner	Green
Federal Reserve Note	2013	Rios	Lew	Green
Federal Reserve Note	2017A	Carranza	Mnuchin	Green
Federal Reserve Note	2021	Malerba	Yellen	Green

== Proposed redesign ==
In 2005, a proposal to put Ronald Reagan's portrait on the $50 bill was put forward, but never went beyond the House Financial Services Committee, even though Republicans controlled the House. In 2010, North Carolina Republican Patrick McHenry introduced another bill to put Reagan's portrait on the $50 bill.
