= Robert McGarvey =

Robert McGarvey may refer to:

- Robert N. McGarvey (1888–1952), American politician
- Robert V. McGarvey (1888–1952), American National Champion racehorse trainer
