= William T. Granahan =

American politician (1895–1956)

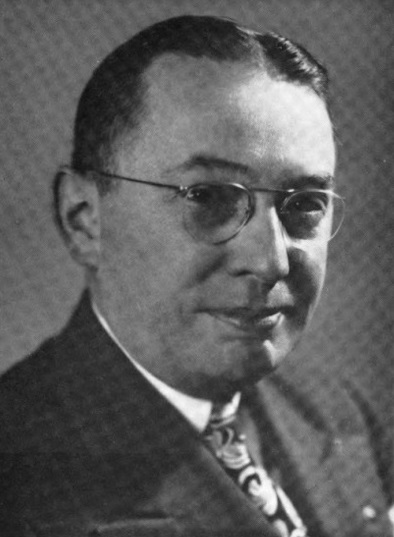

Member of the U.S. House of Representatives from Pennsylvania's 2nd district
- In office January 3, 1949 – May 25, 1956
- Preceded by: Robert N. McGarvey
- Succeeded by: Kathryn E. Granahan
- In office January 3, 1945 – January 3, 1947
- Preceded by: Joseph Marmaduke Pratt
- Succeeded by: Robert N. McGarvey

Personal details
- Born: July 26, 1895 Philadelphia, Pennsylvania
- Died: May 25, 1956 (aged 60) Darby, Pennsylvania
- Party: Democratic

Military service
- Allegiance: United States
- Branch/service: United States Army
- Rank: Private
- Battles/wars: World War I

William Thomas Granahan (July 26, 1895 – May 25, 1956) was a Democratic politician from the U.S. state of Pennsylvania, most prominently serving in the U.S. House of Representatives from 1945–47 and 1949-56.

== Biography ==
Granahan was born in Philadelphia, Pennsylvania; all four of his grandparents were Irish immigrants. He attended parochial schools and La Salle Extension University in Chicago, Illinois. During World War I, he was a private in the U.S. Army, serving in the Army of Occupation in Germany. After the war, he entered the building business.

In the late 1930s, he entered the world of Democratic politics, serving as a member of the state party committee from 1938-42. In 1940, he entered the state government, becoming the state supervisor of the inheritance tax, and in 1941 he moved up to become chief disbursing officer of the state's treasury.

After being sent to Congress in the 1944 elections, he lost a bid for reelection, defeated by Republican Robert N. McGarvey. However, he took back the seat from Congressman McGarvey two years later, and went on to serve four more terms until dying from a heart seizure following a minor abdominal surgery at Fitzgerald Mercy Hospital in Darby, Pennsylvania. He was succeeded after his death by his wife, Kathryn E. Granahan.

== See also ==
- List of members of the United States Congress who died in office (1950–1999)

U.S. House of Representatives
Preceded by Joseph M. Pratt	Member of the U.S. House of Representatives from Pennsylvania's 2nd congressional district 1945–1947	Succeeded by Robert N. McGarvey
Preceded by Robert N. McGarvey	Member of the U.S. House of Representatives from Pennsylvania's 2nd congressional district 1949–1956	Succeeded by Kathryn E. Granahan
