= Katherine D. Ortega =

38th Treasurer of the United States

Katherine Ortega
- Ortega in 1987

38th Treasurer of the United States
- In office September 26, 1983 – July 1, 1989
- President: Ronald Reagan; George H. W. Bush
- Preceded by: Bay Buchanan
- Succeeded by: Cathi Vásquez Villalpando

Personal details
- Born: July 16, 1934 (age 92) Tularosa, New Mexico, U.S.
- Party: Republican
- Spouse: Lloyd Derrickson
- Education: Eastern New Mexico University (BA)

Katherine Dávalos Ortega (born July 16, 1934) is a former politician who was the 38th Treasurer of the United States. She served from September 26, 1983 to July 1, 1989 under Presidents Ronald Reagan and then George H. W. Bush. Ortega also has the distinction of being the first female bank president in the state of California.

== Early life ==
Ortega was born in Tularosa, New Mexico to Donaciano Ortega and Catarina Dávalos. She was one of nine children. Her family had originally come to New Mexico when the area still comprised a territory. Ortega's paternal grandfather arrived from Texas in the 1880s while on her mother's side, her great-grandfather Luciano had been one of the original settlers of Tularosa in 1862.

Ortega's father, a former Justice of the Peace in nearby Bent, opened a blacksmith shop in Tularosa in 1928. By the 1940s, he owned a small restaurant with a dance hall attached in which the entire family worked. Ortega began to work in the restaurant at age 10, operating the cash register. Originally, Ortega grew up speaking only Spanish. She later learned English when she entered the local elementary school.

As a teenager, Ortega worked as a teller at Otero County State Bank in order to earn enough money for college. She attended Eastern New Mexico University and graduated with honors in 1957 with a bachelor's degree in Business and Economics. Initially wanting to become a teacher, Ortega was dismayed by repeated instances of discrimination and, instead, opened a small accounting firm in Alamogordo with one of her sisters, a certified public accountant. The family had already relocated to that town when her father moved the growing restaurant business there in the 1940s and opened a furniture store.

== Banking career ==
In 1968, Ortega moved to Los Angeles where she became a CPA and joined the firm of Peat, Marwick, Mitchell & Company as a tax supervisor. She also worked as a cashier at Pan American National Bank, a financial institution founded in 1963 by Romana Acosta Bañuelos. Ortega became vice president of the bank in 1971 the same year that Bañuelos was sworn-in as U.S. Treasurer. Finally, in 1975, Ortega became president of Santa Ana State Bank, the first woman chief executive of a bank in the state.

Ortega returned to New Mexico in 1977 in order to help run the family accounting firm. Under her stewardship, the company grew into the Otero Savings and Loan Association and, by 1983, had assets of $20 million. During this time, Ortega garnered numerous academic and business accolades for her efforts.

== Political appointments ==
Ortega was involved in Republican Party politics from an early age. "I was born a Republican," she has been quoted on several occasions. She often credited her father, a lifelong Republican, with her decision to join the Party.

Ortega worked for Republicans at local and state levels initially as a type of low-key liaison to women and Hispanic groups in New Mexico. After her return to her home state, she became involved in the 1978 re-election campaign of Sen. Pete Domenici. In time, the senator became something of a political benefactor.

In April 1982, Ortega was named to a 10-person Presidential Advisory Committee on Small and Minority Business Ownership by President Ronald Reagan. In December, she was appointed one of five members and chair of the Copyright Royal Commission, a federal agency established in 1976 to set royalty fees for the cable television and music entertainment industries. In 1983, Sen. Domenici, by that time chairman of the Senate Budget Committee, put forth Ortega's name for the post of U.S. Treasurer. She was officially nominated by President Reagan on September 12 of that year.

== U.S. Treasurer ==
Ortega was sworn in on October 3, 1983 (however, she is listed by the Treasury Department as having begun her term on September 26). She was the tenth consecutive woman and the second-ever Hispanic to hold the office. At her swearing-in ceremony, three previous U.S. Treasurers attended: Francine Irving Neff, Bañuelos, and her immediate predecessor, Bay Buchanan.

While Treasurer, Ortega oversaw a $220 million budget, raised $40 million toward the restoration of the Statue of Liberty, and helped to design a new currency to aid in preventing counterfeiting. She also spearheaded the effort to have the West Point Bullion Depository designated as an official United States Mint.

Although soft-spoken in personal conversation, Ortega became known for her rhetorical speaking skills in public. "Her low-key authenticity works magic with an audience," one Treasury Department official is quoted as saying. In 1984, she was chosen to be the keynote speaker at that year's Republican National Convention- the first Hispanic woman to deliver the lead speech at a national convention. This was done in part to counter the selection of prominent New York governor Mario Cuomo at the Democratic National Convention.

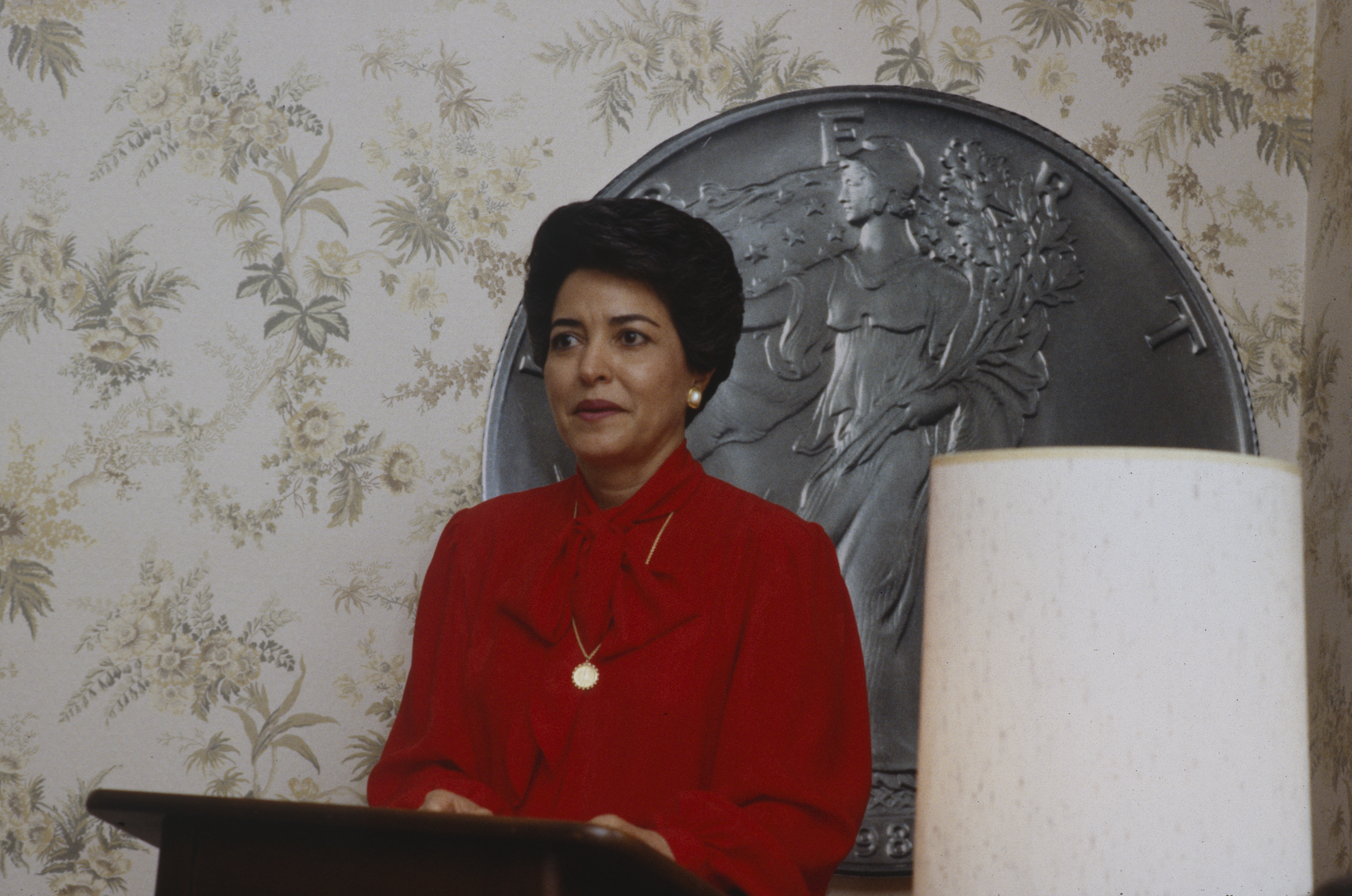
Ortega delivering a speech in 1987

As the highest-ranking Hispanic (until the appointment of Lauro Cavazos as Secretary of Education in 1988) and one of only a few high-profile women in the Administration combined with the largely ceremonial nature of the Treasurer's office, Ortega was one of the key personnel utilized by the White House in outreach to both the Hispanic community and women's organizations. In 1984 alone, she logged almost 60,000 miles in appearances before Republican and Hispanic groups.

In 1986, Ortega conducted a study that rejected the idea of changing the colors of $50 and $100 denomination bills in order to frustrate counterfeiters and drug lords with large amounts of such type of cash. This idea would later be partially incorporated into U.S. currency during subsequent administrations.

After Reagan left office, Ortega was retained by the George H. W. Bush administration and reappointed to her post on January 20, 1989. She retired from the office in July and returned to her family firm in New Mexico.

== Post-Treasurer years ==
While Ortega returned to the private sector and business activities, she still maintained a low profile in political circles. In 1990, she was appointed by President Bush to serve as an Alternate Representative to the United Nations General Assembly for the duration of his administration. She also worked in an advisory capacity for the National Park Service and the non-profit organization, Executive Women in Government.

Ortega served on the Boards of a number of large corporations: Ralston-Purina, Rayonier, Ultramar Diamond Shamrock, and, since 1992, Kroger. She has also continued her efforts on behalf of women in business while working at Catalyst, a business and research advisory firm. Ortega has received honorary degrees from Kean University, Villanova University, and her alma mater, Eastern New Mexico.

=== Sicpa investigation ===
Ortega's years as Treasurer came partially under scrutiny in 1992 when Sen. John Glenn, then chairman of the Senate Governmental Affairs Committee, investigated irregularities in the competitive bidding process used by the Treasury Department. Sen. Glenn's committee questioned the relationship between Robert J. Leuver, then director of the Bureau of Engraving and Printing, and Maurice Amon, president of Sicpa Industries of America – the sole provider of the ink used for U.S. currency since 1982. In particular, Sen. Glenn was concerned over gifts and other gratuities received by Leuver from Amon's company. One focus of the investigation was a business trip taken to the Far East by several government and business officials, including Ortega, Leuver, and Amon, in 1985. Ortega was not implicated in any wrongdoing and Leuver was also exonerated from any impropriety during the course of the investigation. The Department of Justice declined to investigate the matter due to insufficient evidence supporting the claims.

In 2002, Ortega's achievements from humble beginnings were recognized by the Horatio Alger Association of Distinguished Americans when she received the organization's Horatio Alger Award.

== Family life ==
Ortega has cited her family upbringing as her chief inspiration in life:

I am the product of a heritage that teaches strong family devotion, a commitment to earning a livelihood by hard work, patience, determination and preseverance [sic].

Ortega has often singled out her father in particular, saying that "[he] taught me we were as good as anybody else, that we could accomplish anything we wanted ..."

Ortega was married briefly when she returned to New Mexico in the late 1970s. In interviews, she has declined to elaborate on that part of her life, insisting only that she be referred to as "Mrs. Ortega". In 1989, she married Lloyd J. Derrickson, a former general counsel with Merrill Lynch and currently a board member with World Cell, a wireless communications consulting firm. She has no children.

== Notes ==
Political offices
Preceded by Bay Buchanan	Treasurer of the United States; 1983–1989	Succeeded by Cathi Vásquez Villalpando
Party political offices
Preceded by Guy Vander Jagt	Keynote Speaker of the Republican National Convention; 1984	Succeeded by Thomas Kean
