= Federal Reserve Bank Note =

United States banknotes issued between 1915 and 1934

Federal Reserve Bank Notes are legal tender banknotes in the United States that were issued between 1915 and 1934, together with United States Notes, Silver Certificates, Gold Certificates, National Bank Notes and Federal Reserve Notes. They were specified in the Federal Reserve Act of 1913 and had the same value as other kinds of notes of the same denomination. Federal Reserve Bank Notes are different from Federal Reserve Notes in that they are backed by one of the twelve Federal Reserve Banks, rather than by all collectively. Federal Reserve Bank Notes were envisioned as a replacement for National Bank Notes, but that did not prove to be the case. They were backed in a similar way to National Bank Notes, using U.S. bonds, but issued by Federal Reserve banks instead of by chartered National banks. Federal Reserve Bank Notes are no longer issued; the only U.S. banknotes still in production since 1971 are the Federal Reserve Notes.

Large size Federal Reserve Bank Notes were first issued in 1915 in denominations of $5, $10, and $20, using a design that shared elements with both the National Bank Notes and the Federal Reserve Notes of the time. Additional denominations of $1, $2, and $50 were issued in 1918 as an emergency replacement for Silver Certificates, which were temporarily removed from circulation under the Pittman Act.

Small size Federal Reserve Bank Notes were printed as an emergency issue in 1933 using the same paper stock as 1929 National Bank Notes. They were printed in denominations of $5 through $100. The wording, "Or by like deposit of other securities" was added after the phrase, "Secured by United States bonds deposited with the Treasurer of the United States of America". This emergency issue of notes was prompted by the public hoarding of cash due to many bank failures happening at the time. This also limited the ability of the National Banks to issue notes of their own. Small size Federal Reserve Bank Notes were discontinued in 1934 and have not been available from banks since 1945. As small size notes, they have brown seals and serial numbers, as do National Bank Notes of the era. But while they look very similar, and both have the words, "National Currency" across the top of the obverse, they had different issuers and are considered to be distinctly different types of bills.

== Complete denomination type set of Federal Reserve Bank Notes ==
=== Large-size notes ===
Large-size Federal Reserve Bank Notes: Series 1915/1918
Image	Value	Dimensions	Main Color	Description	
Obverse/Reverse	Value	Dimensions	Main Color	Obverse	Reverse
	$1	Large-size note 7.375 x 3.125 inches (187 x 79 mm)	Green; Black	George Washington	Eagle with flag.
	$2	Large-size note 7.375 x 3.125 inches (187 x 79 mm)	Green; Black	Thomas Jefferson	Battleship (New York Class, BB-34 and BB-35).
	$5	Large-size note 7.375 x 3.125 inches (187 x 79 mm)	Green; Black	Abraham Lincoln	Columbus in sight of land; landing of the pilgrims
	$10	Large-size note 7.375 x 3.125 inches (187 x 79 mm)	Green; Black	Andrew Jackson	Industry vignettes (farm and factory)
	$20	Large-size note 7.375 x 3.125 inches (187 x 79 mm)	Green; Black	Grover Cleveland	Transportation vignettes (land, sea, and air)
	$50	Large-size note 7.375 x 3.125 inches (187 x 79 mm)	Green; Black	Ulysses S. Grant	Panama between two ships
	$100	Large-size proof 7.375 x 3.125 inches (187 x 79 mm)	Green; Black	Benjamin Franklin	None, this denomination was never issued (proof only)

=== Small-size notes ===
Small-size Federal Reserve Bank Notes: Series 1929
Image	Value	Dimensions	Main Color	Description	
Obverse/Reverse	Value	Dimensions	Main Color	Obverse	Reverse
	$5	Small-size note 6.125 x 2.625 inches (156 x 67 mm)	Green; Black	Abraham Lincoln	Lincoln Memorial
	$10	Small-size note 6.125 x 2.625 inches (156 x 67 mm)	Green; Black	Alexander Hamilton	US Treasury Building
	$20	Small-size note 6.125 x 2.625 inches (156 x 67 mm)	Green; Black	Andrew Jackson	The White House
	$50	Small-size note 6.125 x 2.625 inches (156 x 67 mm)	Green; Black	Ulysses S. Grant	US Capitol Building
	$100	Small-size note 6.125 x 2.625 inches (156 x 67 mm)	Green; Black	Benjamin Franklin	Independence Hall
