= Robert N. McGarvey =

American politician (1888–1952)

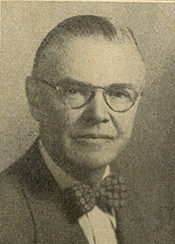
- McGarvey in 1947

Member of the U.S. House of Representatives from Pennsylvania's 2nd district
- In office January 3, 1947 – January 3, 1949
- Preceded by: William T. Granahan
- Succeeded by: William T. Granahan

Personal details
- Born: August 14, 1888 Philadelphia, Pennsylvania
- Died: June 28, 1952 (aged 63)
- Resting place: Holy Cross Cemetery, Yeadon, Pennsylvania
- Party: Republican

Robert Neill McGarvey (August 14, 1888 – June 28, 1952) was a Republican member of the United States House of Representatives from Pennsylvania.

Robert McGarvey was born in Philadelphia. He attended the University of Pennsylvania Business College. He was engaged as a telegrapher and as manager of a news bureau. He became an investment broker in 1922.

He was elected to Congress as a Republican in 1946 to the 80th United States Congress, defeating incumbent Democratic Congressman William T. Granahan. He was one of six Republicans to capture Democratic House seats in Philadelphia. Four of the Republicans, like McGarvey, were new to the House. As a congressman he was part of the Federal Commission that helped to designate Independence Hall as a National Historical Park. Like four of the 1946 victors, he was an unsuccessful candidate for reelection in 1948 in a re-match against Granahan.

== Sources ==
- United States Congress. "Robert N. McGarvey (id: M000442)". Biographical Directory of the United States Congress.
- The Political Graveyard

U.S. House of Representatives
Preceded by William T. Granahan	Member of the U.S. House of Representatives from Pennsylvania's 2nd congressional district 1947 - 1949	Succeeded by William T. Granahan
