= Bay Buchanan =

American conservative political commentator

37th Treasurer of the United States
- In office March 20, 1981 – July 5, 1983
- President: Ronald Reagan
- Preceded by: Azie Taylor Morton
- Succeeded by: Katherine D. Ortega

Personal details
- Born: Angela Marie Buchanan; December 23, 1948 (age 77) Washington, D.C., U.S.
- Party: Republican
- Spouse: William Jackson (m. 1982, divorced)
- Children: 3

Angela Marie "Bay" Buchanan (born December 23, 1948) is a conservative political commentator who served as Treasurer of the United States under President Ronald Reagan. She is the sister of conservative political commentator Pat Buchanan.

== Early life ==
Buchanan was born December 23, 1948, in Washington, D.C., to Catherine (Crum), a nurse, and William Buchanan, an accountant. She attended Georgetown Visitation Preparatory School, where she was the captain of the hockey and basketball teams. She earned a bachelor's degree in mathematics at Rosemont College in 1971, and went on to receive a master's degree in mathematics from McGill University in 1973.

== Career ==
Buchanan was the national treasurer of the "Reagan for President" primary campaigns of 1976 and 1980, and the Reagan-Bush general election campaigns of 1980 and 1984. After appearing regularly on CNN's news program Inside Politics, she became a commentator for The Situation Room, and later Campbell Brown: No Bias, No Bull. She previously served as the co-anchor of Equal Time on CNBC and MSNBC, and during that time also hosted a two-hour radio talk show.

Appointed at the age of 32, Buchanan was the youngest person to serve as Treasurer of the United States. She held that post from March 20, 1981, to July 5, 1983, after which she was appointed Chairwoman of the President's Commission on Women Business Owners.

Buchanan managed her brother Pat Buchanan's three unsuccessful campaigns for President of the United States.

The co-chair of the California delegation to the 1988 Republican National Convention, Buchanan also served as the co-chair of the defense subcommittee of the Party platform Committee. In 1990, she ran in the California Republican primary election for state treasurer, against incumbent Thomas W. Hayes. Hayes prevailed, but would go on to lose the general election to Democrat Kathleen Brown.

In May 2006, Buchanan was appointed chair of Team America PAC, a political action committee founded by Tom Tancredo. In 2007, she served as chairman to Tancredo's presidential campaign, after which she became a senior advisor to Mitt Romney. After the 2012 U.S. Presidential Election, Buchanan became a licensed real estate agent in Virginia, working for the firm McEnearney Associates.

== Personal life ==
In 1976, Buchanan converted from Roman Catholicism to Mormonism. In 1982, she married William Jackson, an attorney; they later divorced. Buchanan is the mother of three sons: William (born 1983), Thomas (born 1984) and Stuart (born 1987). She was forced to give birth to the last of her boys, Stuart, alone, and therefore raise her three boys as a single mother, when her husband walked out on the family. Buchanan has signed a number of $1 banknotes from the 1981 series, which were printed while she was serving as treasurer. These notes have an increased value to numismatists because of the "Courtesy Autograph."

== Published works ==
- Buchanan, Bay (2007). The Extreme Makeover of Hillary (Rodham) Clinton. Regnery Publishing. ISBN 978-1-59698-507-0.
- —— (2012). Bay and Her Boys. Da Capo Press.

Political offices
Preceded by Azie Taylor Morton	Treasurer of the United States; 1981—1983	Succeeded by Katherine D. Ortega
