= Dorothy Andrews Elston Kabis =

American politician

33rd Treasurer of the United States
- In office May 8, 1969 – July 3, 1971
- President: Richard M. Nixon
- Preceded by: Kathryn E. Granahan
- Succeeded by: Romana Acosta Bañuelos

President of the National Federation of Republican Women
- In office 1963–1967
- Preceded by: Ruth Parks
- Succeeded by: Gladys O’Donnell

Personal details
- Born: Dorothy Andrews; March 22, 1917 Wilkes Barre, Pennsylvania, U.S.
- Died: July 3, 1971 (aged 54) Sheffield, Massachusetts, U.S.
- Party: Republican
- Spouse(s): Russell Ransom Elston; Walter Kabis

Dorothy Andrews Elston Kabis (March 22, 1917 – July 3, 1971) was a Republican Party activist and former Treasurer of the United States from Delaware, having served from May 8, 1969, until her death. She was the only treasurer to marry while in office.

== Biography ==
Elston Kabis died of a heart attack in Sheffield, Massachusetts, at 54 while visiting her father's grave. In her honor, the NFRW established an internship program for young women.

== Name change ==
Following her appointment as treasurer by U.S. President Richard M. Nixon as Dorothy Andrews Elston, she married Walter L. Kabis (1914–2009), a World War II Pacific Navy veteran on the USS England (DE-635) and a school principal from Wilmington, Delaware, in 1970 and changed her name to Dorothy Andrews Elston Kabis. She became the first (and so far only) treasurer to have their name changed while in office, an event significant because the signature of the Treasurer of the United States appears on U.S. paper currency.

As Elston, Kabis signature appeared on the series 1969 one-dollar bill. The resulting change in Kabis' signature appeared first on the Series 1969A note, so designated to show a different name as treasurer, even though it was the same person.

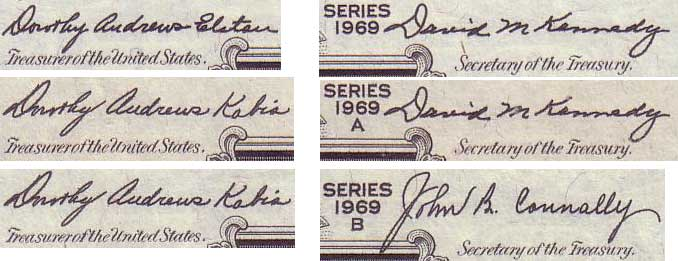
Signatures from year 1969 U.S. Federal Reserve notes. Kabis's signatures are at left.

Preceded by Kathryn E. Granahan	Treasurer of the United States; 1969–1971	Succeeded by Romana Acosta Bañuelos
Preceded by Ruth Parks of Colorado	President of the National Federation of Republican Women; 1963–1968	Succeeded by Gladys O'Donnell of California
