= National Gold Bank Note =

- Country: United States Of America
- Value: $5, $10, $20, $50, $100, and $500
- Security features: None
- Years of printing: 1870 – 1875

Obverse
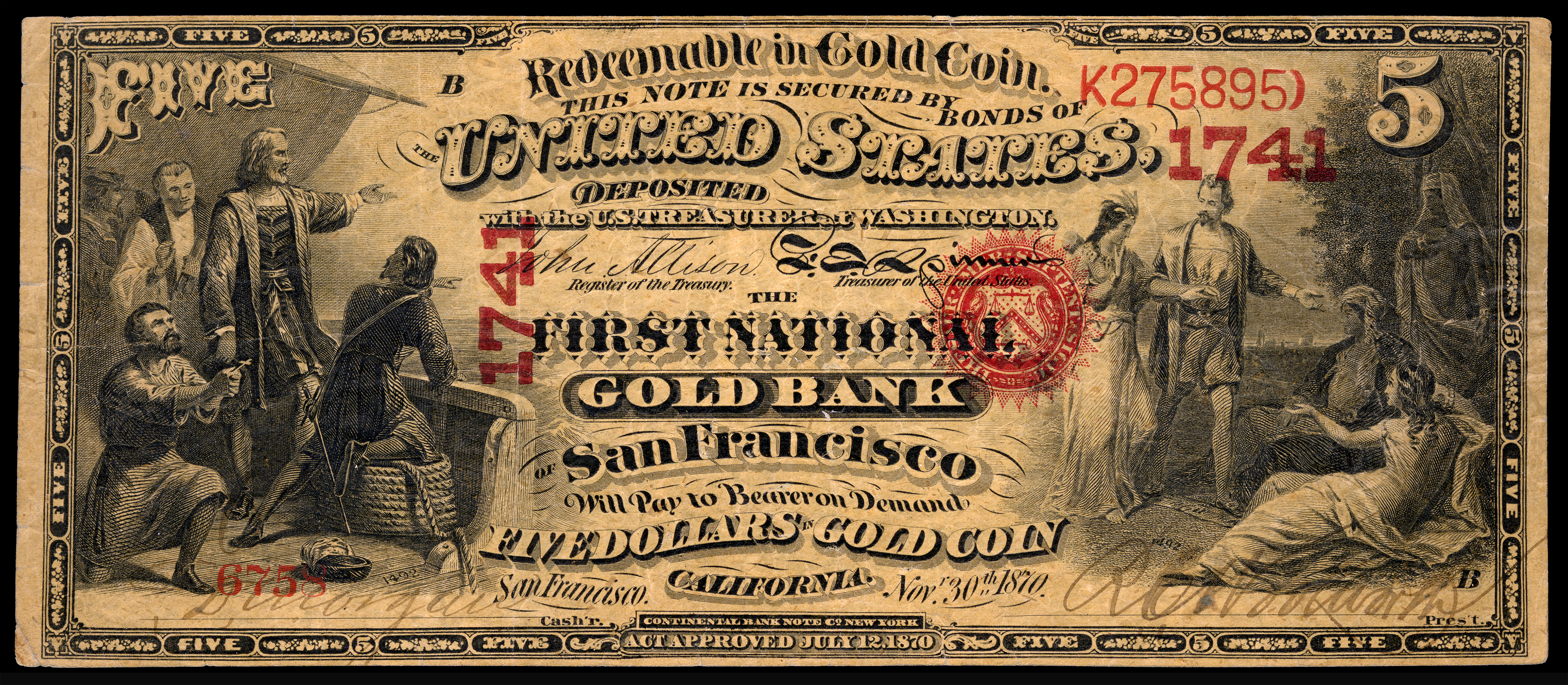
- Design: Various
- Design date: 1870s

Reverse
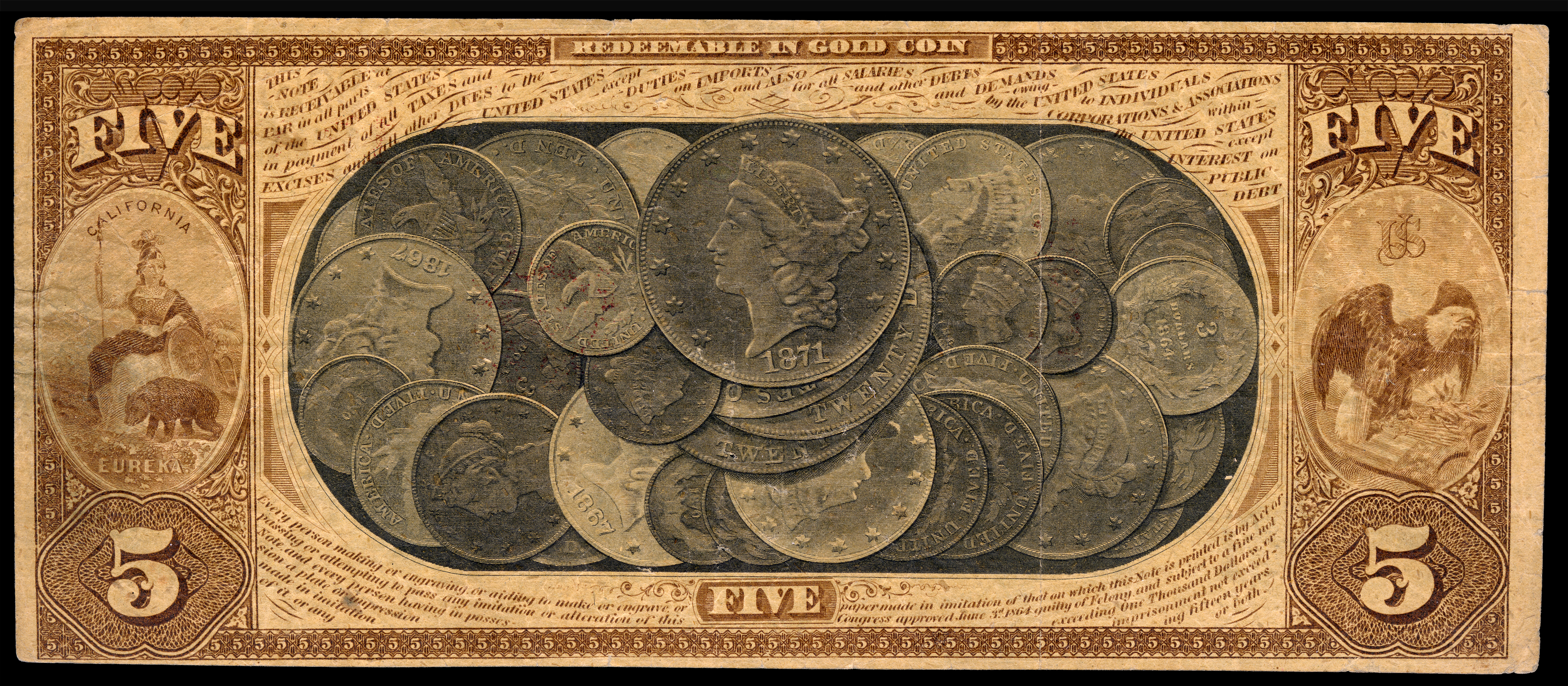
- Design: Ornamental with an array of United States gold coins
- Design date: 1870s

National Gold Bank Notes were National Bank Notes issued by nine national gold banks in California in the 1870s and 1880s and redeemable in gold. Printed on a yellow-tinted paper, six denominations circulated: $5, $10, $20, $50, $100, and $500. A $1,000 note was designed and printed but never issued. During the issuing period of national gold banks (1871–83), the U.S. Treasury issued 200,558 notes totaling $3,465,240. Today, National Gold Bank Notes are rare in the higher denominations (and unknown on some issuing banks) with condition generally falling in the good-to-fine range. (Note: "Any National Gold Bank Note in crisp new condition is practically unheard of and is an outstanding rarity. The general condition in which these notes are found is one of advanced circulation and notes in very fine or better condition are extremely rare.") Approximately 630 National Gold Bank Notes are known to exist, and roughly 20 grade above "very fine".

== History ==
The National Gold Bank Notes were authorized under the provisions of the Currency Act of July 12, 1870. The series was a result of the California Gold Rush, where gold coins were preferred in commerce. Ten national gold banks were charted, nine of them in California and one in Boston, Massachusetts.

The Kidder Bank was the only bank to have $1,000 notes among others prepared, however, no notes circulated from the bank.

== Issuing banks ==
Issuers of National Gold Bank Notes
Title	City	Charter	Date	Denominations	Total issue
The Kidder National Gold Bank (Note: The Kidder National Gold Bank ordered 250 notes which were returned (in full) to the comptroller of the currency's office.)	Boston	1699	15 Aug 1870	50, 100, 500, 1000	$120,000
The First National Gold Bank	San Francisco	1741	30 Nov 1870	5, 10, 20, 50, 100, 500	$1,185,000
The National Gold Bank and Trust Company	San Francisco	1994	3 Jun 1872	5, 10, 20, 50, 100, 500	$853,750
The National Gold Bank of D.O. Mills & Co.	Sacramento	2014	19 Jul 1872	5, 10, 20, 50, 100, 500	$270,450
The First National Gold Bank	Stockton	2077	27 Jan 1873	5, 10, 20, 50, 100	$414,700
The First National Gold Bank	Santa Barbara	2104	7 May 1873	5, 10, 50, 100	$80,000
The Farmers National Gold Bank	San Jose	2158	21 Jul 1874	5, 10, 20, 50, 100	$242,590
The First National Gold Bank	Petaluma	2193	25 Sep 1874	10, 20, 50, 100	$178,150
The First National Gold Bank	Oakland	2248	10 Apr 1875	10, 20	$80,600
The Union National Gold Bank	Oakland	2266	20 May 1875	10, 20, 50, 100	$40,000

== Series overview ==
Complete type set of known denominations
Value	Image	Plate dates	Signatures (Note: On the notes illustrated.)	Remarks (Note: All population and issuance statistics cited are attributed to the National Bank Note Census and were retrieved mid-May, 2014.)
$5	alt1=$5 National Gold Bank Note, The First National Gold Bank of San Francisco	1870, 1872, 1873, 1874	Edwin D. Morgan (cashier) and Ralph C. Woolworth (president)	427 reported
$10	alt1=$10 National Gold Bank Note, The First National Gold Bank of Oakland	1870, 1872, 1873, 1874, 1875	Galen M. Fisher (cashier) and Benjamin F. Ferris (president)	117 reported
$20	alt1=$20 National Gold Bank Note, The First National Gold Bank of San Francisco	1870, 1872, 1873, 1874, 1875	Edwin D. Morgan (cashier) and Ralph C. Woolworth (president)	71 reported
$50	alt1=$50 National Gold Bank Note, The First National Gold Bank of San Francisco	1870, 1874	Edwin D. Morgan (cashier) and Ralph C. Woolworth (president)	7 reported
$100	alt1=$100 National Gold Bank Note, The First National Gold Bank of Petaluma	1870, 1873, 1874, 1875	Henry H. Atwater (cashier) and Issac G. Wickersham (president)	9 reported
$500	None known	1870, 1872		Unknown (Note: $500 National Gold Bank Notes were issued by only three banks. Four notes have not been redeemed but to date none have been reported.)
$1,000	None known	1870		Not issued (Note: The $1,000 National Gold Bank Note was not circulated.)
