= Kathryn E. Granahan =

American politician (1894–1979)

Kathryn Elizabeth Granahan
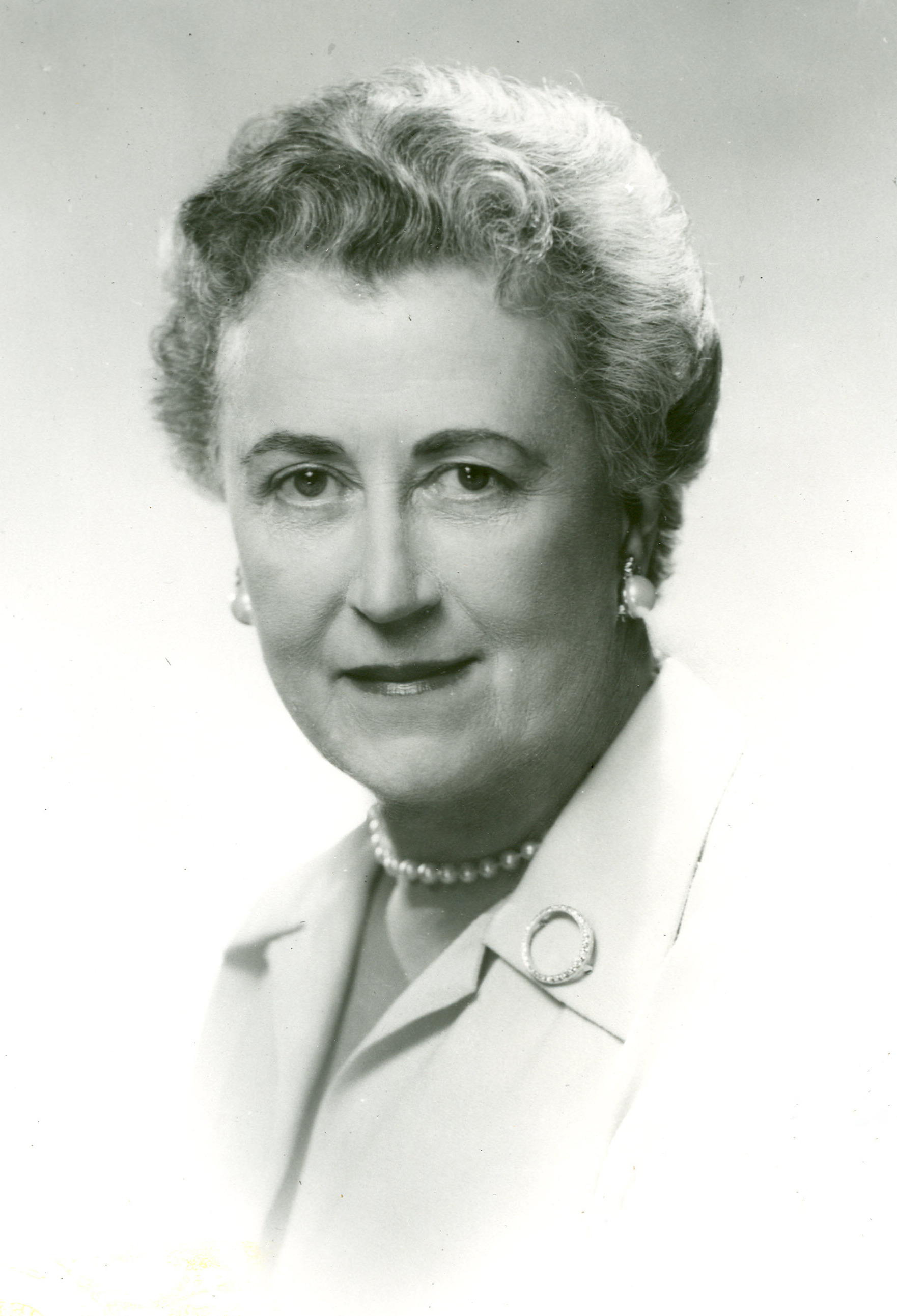
- Granahan, c. 1947

32nd Treasurer of the United States
- In office January 9, 1963 – November 22, 1966
- President: John F. Kennedy; Lyndon Johnson
- Preceded by: Elizabeth Rudel Smith
- Succeeded by: Dorothy Andrews Elston Kabis

Member of the U.S. House of Representatives from Pennsylvania's 2nd district
- In office November 6, 1956 – January 3, 1963
- Preceded by: William T. Granahan
- Succeeded by: Robert N. C. Nix Sr.

Personal details
- Born: Kathryn Elizabeth O'Hay; December 7, 1894 Easton, Pennsylvania, U.S.
- Died: July 10, 1979 (aged 84) Norristown, Pennsylvania, U.S.
- Resting place: Gethsemane Cemetery, Easton, Pennsylvania, U.S.
- Party: Democratic
- Spouse: William T. Granahan
- Education: Mount St. Joseph Collegiate Institute

Kathryn Elizabeth Granahan (December 7, 1894 – July 10, 1979) was an American politician. She served as a member of the U.S. House of Representatives from Pennsylvania and was appointed Treasurer of the United States by President John F. Kennedy.

Granahan was a member of the Democratic Party and was the first woman to be elected to the United States Congress from Philadelphia.

== Early life and education ==
Granahan was born Kathryn Elizabeth O'Hay in Easton, Pennsylvania in the Lehigh Valley region of eastern Pennsylvania. All four of her grandparents were Irish immigrants. She graduated from Easton Area High School and then Mount St. Joseph Collegiate Institute in Philadelphia, which was later renamed Chestnut Hill College.

== Career ==
She was supervisor of public assistance in the State Auditor General's Department, and liaison officer between that department and Pennsylvania Department of Public Assistance, from 1940 to 1943.

She was a member of national board, Woman's Medical College of Pennsylvania in Philadelphia and was a delegate to the 1960 Democratic National Convention in Los Angeles.

=== Congress ===
Her husband, Rep. William T. Granahan served in Congress from 1945 to 1947 and from 1949 until his death in 1956. His death came shortly after the 1956 primary election and the Democratic Party in Philadelphia selected Kathryn to succeed her husband in both the special election and general election. She was simultaneously elected to serve out her husband's term in the 84th United States Congress and a term in the 85th United States Congress in her own right.

She served as chair of the House Subcommittee on Postal Operations, and worked with Postmaster General Arthur Summerfield to pass the Granahan bill "to seize and detain the mail of anyone suspected of trafficking in obscenity."

=== Treasurer of the United States ===
After the 1960 census, Pennsylvania was expected to lose three seats in redistricting. The Democratic Party leadership chose Granahan's seat as one of those to be eliminated. Rep. Bill Green secured her assurance not to run in the 1962 elections. In return, Green convinced then U.S. president John F. Kennedy to appoint her Treasurer of the United States, which Kennedy did.

Granahan began her term as Treasurer on January 9, 1963 after her term in Congress ended. In 1965, Granahan suffered a blood clot after a fall, and worked a reduced schedule following the incident. In 1966, an effort to declare her incompetent failed; however, she resigned four months later.

=== Television appearances ===
Granahan made guest appearances on What's My Line? on March 3, 1963, and To Tell the Truth in November 1963.

== Death ==
Granahan died in Norristown, Pennsylvania on July 10, 1979, at age 84. She is interred at Gethsemane Cemetery in Easton, Pennsylvania.

== See also ==
- Women in the United States House of Representatives

== Sources ==
- United States Congress. "Kathryn E. Granahan (id: G000368)". Biographical Directory of the United States Congress.
- Kathryn E. Granahan at The Political Graveyard

U.S. House of Representatives
Preceded by William T. Granahan	Member of the U.S. House of Representatives from Pennsylvania's 2nd congressional district 1956 - 1963	Succeeded by Robert N. C. Nix Sr.
Legal offices
Preceded by Elizabeth Rudel Smith	Treasurer of the United States; 1963–1966	Succeeded by Dorothy Andrews Elston Kabis
