= Azie Taylor Morton =

Treasurer of the United States

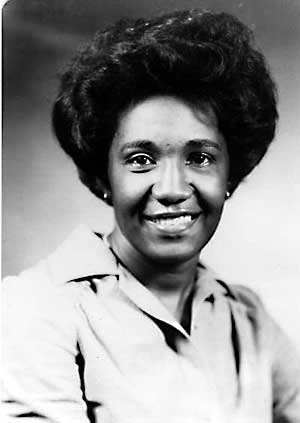
- Official portrait

36th Treasurer of the United States
- In office September 12, 1977 – January 20, 1981
- President: Jimmy Carter
- Preceded by: Francine Irving Neff
- Succeeded by: Angela Marie Buchanan

Personal details
- Born: February 1, 1936 Dale, Texas, U.S.
- Died: December 7, 2003 (aged 67) Bastrop County, Texas, U.S.
- Party: Democratic
- Spouse: James Homer Morton

Azie Taylor Morton (February 1, 1936 – December 7, 2003) was the Treasurer of the United States during the Carter administration from September 12, 1977, to January 20, 1981. She remains the only African American to hold that office. Her signature was printed on U.S. currency during her tenure.

== Early life ==
Morton was born to Fleta Hazel Taylor in a rural African-American enclave called the St. John Colony in the farming community of Dale, Texas. She attended Texas Blind, Deaf, and Orphan School, in Austin, as it was the only high school that served black students due to school segregation. In 1952, at the age of 16, Morton graduated from high school and was admitted to Huston-Tillotson University, an HBCU also located in Austin. Morton graduated Cum Laude with a Bachelor of Science degree in Commercial Education in 1956.

Taylor worked as a teacher at the Crocker School for Girls, a state-sponsored school for delinquents. Taylor was not deterred by these setbacks and began to work for change.

== Career ==
Before becoming treasurer, Taylor served on President John F. Kennedy's Committee on Equal Employment Opportunity. From 1972 to 1976, she was a special assistant to Robert Schwarz Strauss, the chair of the Democratic National Committee. Taylor was a member of Alpha Kappa Alpha sorority.

== Personal life ==
Azie Taylor married James Homer Morton on May 29, 1965. The couple had two daughters, Virgie Morton and Stacey Morton, who later brought them two granddaughters and four great-grandchildren. James Homer Morton died in January 2003.

== Death and legacy ==
On December 6, 2003, Morton suffered a stroke at her home in Bastrop County, Texas, and she died of complications the next day.

In April 2018, Robert E. Lee Road in Austin was renamed Azie Morton Road in her honor.

Political offices
Preceded by Francine Irving Neff	Treasurer of the United States; 1977—1981	Succeeded by Angela Marie Buchanan
