= Francine I. Neff =

34th Treasurer of the United States
- In office June 23, 1974 – January 20, 1977
- President: Richard Nixon; Gerald Ford
- Preceded by: Romana Acosta Bañuelos
- Succeeded by: Azie Taylor Morton

Personal details
- Born: December 6, 1925 Albuquerque, New Mexico, U.S.
- Died: February 9, 2010 (aged 84) Peña Blanca, New Mexico, U.S.
- Party: Republican

Francine Irving Neff (December 6, 1925 – February 9, 2010) was the 35th Treasurer of the United States, serving from June 21, 1974, to January 19, 1977. She was appointed by Richard Nixon but continued serving as Treasurer through Gerald Ford's term in office after Nixon resigned in August 1974.

== Republican politics ==
Originally a Democrat who had become increasingly disenchanted with her party's politics, Neff switched her allegiance to the Republican Party and volunteered with Barry Goldwater's presidential campaign in 1964. She rose through the ranks of New Mexico Republican politics, being named to its State Central Committee in 1967, chairperson of the New Mexico Women for Nixon in 1968 and member of the State Executive Committee in 1969. She was promoted to represent her state with the Republican National Committee in 1970 and served as a member on its executive committee from 1972 until she became Treasurer.

== Treasurer ==
Neff was nominated to become Treasurer of the United States by President Nixon on May 29, 1974. She was officially sworn into office on June 21, succeeding Romana Acosta Bañuelos who had resigned four months prior on February 14. The first batch of dollar bills bearing her signature came off the printing presses on July 3, 1974.

Neff took office at a time when the role of Treasurer was being reorganized. The Treasurer was named National Director of the Savings Bonds Division for the first time during her term. She was the first Treasurer to manage a bureau and the first to report to the Undersecretary for Monetary Affairs. She also oversaw the Treasury-wide bicentennial program. She was unsuccessful in her attempt to be a New Mexico delegate at the 1976 Republican National Convention.

In the transition from the Gerald Ford to the Jimmy Carter Administration, Neff was succeeded as Treasurer by Azie Taylor Morton who was sworn in on September 12, 1977.

== Personal life ==
Despite her parents moving to Mexico where her father worked the oil fields, Neff was born in Albuquerque, New Mexico, because her mother made a special trip back to ensure her birth in the United States. She grew up on a small vegetable farm outside of Mountainair, New Mexico.

She studied at Cottey College, in Nevada, Missouri, where she was a member of Alpha Delta Pi and graduated in 1946. She then matriculated at the University of New Mexico, double majoring in English and Music and earning her Bachelor of Arts in 1948. It was at the university where she met Edward J. Neff, with the two marrying each other on their graduation day. Her husband was a founding partner of Neff & Co., an Albuquerque-based accounting firm.

While Neff was Vice President of the Rio Grande Valley Bank in Albuquerque, she was named to the advisory board of Campaign America, a political action committee (PAC) established by Bob Dole on February 26, 1978, to assist the campaigns of Republican candidates for federal, state and local offices. She was featured in a 1978 American Express television advertisement which was part of its "Do you know me?" campaign.

Neff was a member of the Horatio Alger Association of Distinguished Americans. She was awarded an honorary doctorate from New Mexico State University in 2008.

== Death ==
Neff died from heart failure on February 9, 2010, in Pena Blanca, New Mexico.

Political offices
Preceded by Romana Acosta Bañuelos	Treasurer of the United States; 1974–1977	Succeeded by Azie Taylor Morton
