= Romana Acosta Bañuelos =

Treasurer of the United States (from 1971 to 1974)

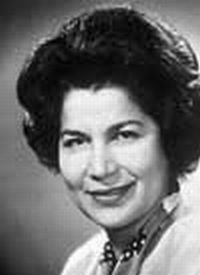
- Official Portrait

34th Treasurer of the United States
- In office December 17, 1971 – February 14, 1974
- President: Richard M. Nixon
- Preceded by: Dorothy Andrews Elston Kabis
- Succeeded by: Francine Irving Neff

Personal details
- Born: March 20, 1925 Miami, Arizona, U.S.
- Died: January 15, 2018 (aged 92) Redondo Beach, California, U.S.
- Party: Republican
- Spouse(s): Martin Torres (divorced); Alejandro Bañuelos

Bañuelos's signature as used on American currency

Romana Acosta Bañuelos (March 20, 1925 – January 15, 2018) was the 34th Treasurer of the United States. Appointed by President Richard Nixon on September 20, 1971, she served from December 17, 1971, to February 14, 1974.

Born in Arizona into a poor family of Mexican immigrants, Acosta was deported with her parents during the Depression. The U.S. forced many immigrant workers back to Mexico. At the age of 18, Acosta returned as a citizen to the United States, settling in Los Angeles, California. There she soon founded a tortilla factory and became a successful businesswoman, owner of what became a multimillion-dollar business. Her Ramona's Mexican Food Products, Inc. was headquartered in Gardena, California. She also was a co-founder and president of the Pan American National Bank in East Los Angeles. She was the first Latina to serve as Treasurer of the United States (1971–1974).

== Early life ==
Romana Acosta, daughter of poor Mexican immigrants, was born in the mining town of Miami, Arizona, on March 20, 1925, to Juan Francisco Acosta and Teresa Lugo. In 1933, during the Great Depression, the U.S. government deported her family, and thousands of other Mexican Americans, even though many of the deportees, like Acosta, had been born in the United States (and were legally U.S. citizens according to the 14th Amendment and not subject to deportation). But the Acostas would not have separated from their eight-year-old daughter. They believed the deportation officials' statement that they could return to the U.S. as soon as the country's economy had improved. They accepted the government's offer to pay for their moving expenses and left their home peacefully.

In Mexico, they moved in with relatives who owned a small ranch in Sonora. Acosta and her parents rose early to tend the crops planted by her father and other male relatives. She also helped her mother in the kitchen, making empanadas that her mother sold to bakeries and restaurants. Acosta later recalled that her mother, who also raised chickens to sell their eggs, "was the type of woman who taught us how to live in any place and work with what we have." She recalled her mother as a resourceful businesswoman who presented a strong role model for what a woman could do economically with very little.

At the age of 16, Acosta married Martin Torres; in the Mexican rural culture, this was not considered too young. The couple quickly had two sons, Carlos and Martin, by the time Acosta was 18. She took her children and moved to the United States. Most accounts say that Acosta arrived in Los Angeles, California, with her children, unable to speak English and with seven dollars to her name. Some suggest she worked in an El Paso, Texas, laundromat for a time; others say that she followed an aunt to Los Angeles.

== Career ==
=== Ramona's Mexican Food Products ===
Working as a dishwasher by day and as a tortilla maker from midnight to 6 a.m., Acosta soon made enough money to save some. At 21, she married Alejandro Bañuelos. With her $500 in savings, she started a tortilla factory in downtown Los Angeles. Acosta bought a tortilla machine, a fan, and a corn grinder. With the aid of her aunt, she made $36 on the factory's first day of business in 1949.

Ambitious and driven, Acosta constantly sought opportunities to sell her tortillas to local businesses. As sales volume increased, she incorporated the company and named it Ramona's Mexican Food Products, Inc. There are differing opinions on how the business name came about: some say the sign painters made a mistake when spelling "Romana"; others say she used "Ramona", a fictional California woman popularized in the 1884 novel of that name by Helen Hunt Jackson. Others believe the name arose because of others' unfamiliarity with the name "Romana." By the mid-1960s, Ramona's Mexican Food Products, Inc. was thriving. Acosta and her husband had a daughter together, whom she named Ramona after the business.

=== Pan-American National Bank ===
In 1963, looking for ways to help local struggling Latinos, Acosta and some businessmen founded the Pan-American National Bank in East Los Angeles, California. The men had initially approached her husband with the proposal, but he was busy with political work and suggested the men talk to Acosta. The bank's main purpose was to bankroll Latinos who wanted to start their own businesses. Acosta also believed that if Latinos could increase their financial base, they would have more political influence and be able to improve their standard of living.

In 1969 Acosta was appointed chairperson of the bank's board of directors and received the city's Outstanding Business Woman of the Year Award. Later that year, Mayor Sam Yorty presented her with a commendation from the County Board of Supervisors. Acosta established a college scholarship fund, the Ramona Mexican Food Products Scholarship, for poor Mexican-American students.

=== United States Treasurer ===
With bank assets already in the millions and deposits climbing rapidly, Pan-American National's success caught the attention of the Richard Nixon's administration. The president was seeking to repay the Republican National Hispanic Assembly, which had played a strong role in his election. Acosta agreed to the nomination when asked in 1970 if she would consider the office of U.S. Treasurer. She was stunned when Nixon personally chose her as his candidate.

During the nomination process, Acosta was taken aback by a sudden raid on her tortilla factory by U.S. Immigration Service agents. The agents, contrary to their usual methods, reportedly carried out a loud, disruptive raid through the facility, attracting a lot of press attention. However, Nixon sided with her and called the raid politically motivated, charging the Democratic Party with instigating it. A later Senate investigation concluded that the raid was carried out solely to cause embarrassment to the Nixon administration.

Acosta sailed through the confirmation process to become the nation's 34th Treasurer and the first Latina Treasurer in U.S. history. She took office on December 17, 1971, becoming the highest-ranking Mexican-American in the government. Her daughter Ramona said of Acosta's performance, "My mother's legacy is that she ran the place as a business, not just as another wing of the government."

Acosta Bañuelos served as treasurer until 1974, by which time Nixon was embroiled in the Watergate affair. He resigned and his vice-president Gerald Ford succeeded him. Acosta had resigned as treasurer earlier in the year to return to her businesses, family, and philanthropic pursuits. She said during a 1979 interview with Nuestro magazine, "It was a beautiful experience. I will always be grateful to President Nixon." Later that year, Acosta was a founding member of Executive Women in Government.

By 1979, Ramona's was making and distributing 22 different food products. It had more than 400 employees and sales of $12 million a year. The company's success was instrumental in the popularization of Mexican cuisine in the United States. As the Hispanic population of the country grew, so did sales of tortillas, empanadas, and many other traditional favorites. Other ethnic groups began to favor the inexpensive, delicious foods as well, boosting the company's profits. Ramona's continued to grow throughout the 1980s, when it became one of the largest distributors and manufacturers of Mexican food in California.

== Later life ==
Throughout the 1980s and 1990s, Acosta continued to serve as president of Ramona's and Pan-American National. By 1992, she had served three terms as chair of the bank's board of directors. In the late 1990s she allowed her three children to take over daily operations of Ramona's and to play large roles in the bank's operations.

Acosta Bañuelos remained CEO at Pan-American National and president of Ramona's, running both businesses from her Los Angeles home. The Acosta family owned two-thirds of the shares in the publicly traded bank. Pan-American National Bank is credited with helping troubled East Los Angeles develop a sense of community and make economic gains in business.

Acosta Bañuelos died January 15, 2018, in Redondo Beach, California.

== Awards ==
- Outstanding Business Woman of the Year, City of Los Angeles, 1969.
- Commendation Award, County of Los Angeles, 1969.
- Woman Achievement Award, The East Los Angeles Community Union, 1977.
- Lifetime Achievement Award, Latino Business Chamber of Greater Los Angeles, 2011.

Political offices
Preceded by Dorothy Andrews Elston Kabis	Treasurer of the United States; 1971–1974	Succeeded by Francine Irving Neff
