= List of people on United States banknotes =

Individual portraits of 53 people central to the history of the United States are depicted on the country's banknotes (Note: The scope of U.S. banknotes (e.g., 1861 to the present) is based on the parameters established by the Friedberg reference book.) including presidents, cabinet members, members of Congress, Founding Fathers, jurists, and military leaders. The Secretary of the Treasury was given broad latitude by Congress in 1862 to supervise the design, printing, and issue of banknotes. (Note: An Act to Authorize the Issue of United States Notes, and for the Redemption or Funding Thereof, and for Funding the Floating Debt of the United States. Feb 25, 1862 Vol. XII, p.345 (original).) The Secretary, with input from the Bureau of Engraving and Printing, has final approval over the design of banknotes. (Note: Placement of an individual on a banknote by an Act of Congress supersedes Treasury Department approval.)

The redesign of U.S. banknotes in 1922 prompted the Treasury Department to review the portraits on banknotes and conclude that "portraits of Presidents of the United States have a more permanent familiarity in the minds of the public than any others." Exceptions were made for Alexander Hamilton, Salmon Chase, and Benjamin Franklin. There have been no changes in the people depicted on currency intended for the general public since 1928; when Woodrow Wilson was depicted on the 1934 $100,000 gold certificate, the note was only for internal Treasury and Federal Reserve Bank use.

Six people have been depicted on U.S. currency during their lifetime, with each of those depictions occurring during the American Civil War. Abraham Lincoln was portrayed on the 1861 $10 Demand Note; Salmon Chase, Lincoln's Secretary of the Treasury, approved his own portrait for the 1862 $1 Legal Tender Note; Winfield Scott was depicted on Interest Bearing Notes during the early 1860s; William P. Fessenden (U.S. Senator and Secretary of the Treasury) appeared on fractional currency, as did Francis Spinner and Spencer Clark who both approved the use of their own image on fractional currency. In 1873, driven in large part by the actions of Spinner and Clark, Congress prohibited the use of portraits of living people on any U.S. bond, security, note, or fractional or postal currency.

== Key to banknote type abbreviations ==
Many of the 53 individuals were depicted on more than one note of a series or denomination. In the description of the banknotes, the date in parentheses indicates the individual's first appearance on a given note type and denomination. When multiple banknotes are listed, the order, though seeming random, is in accordance with the Friedberg Number, in ascending Friedberg order. (Note: Large size notes represent the earlier types or series of U.S. banknotes. Their "average" dimension is 7.375 x 3.125 inches (187 x 79 mm). Small size notes (described as such due to their size relative to the earlier large size notes) are an "average" 6.125 x 2.625 inches (156 x 67 mm), the size of modern U.S. currency. "Each measurement is +/- 0.08 inches (2mm) to account for margins and cutting".) (Note: Exceptions to the large versus small categories are the CITN, IBN, and RC, all slightly larger than the large size note dimensions.) The engraved portraits are from a virtual exhibit of bank notes which are part of the National Numismatic Collection at the Smithsonian Institution.

Key to banknote type abbreviations
Abbr	Note type	Note size
DN	Demand Note	Large
LT	Legal Tender	Large
CITN	Compound Interest Treasury Note	Exception
IBN	Interest Bearing Note	Exception
RC	Refunding Certificate	Exception
SC	Silver Certificate	Large
TN	Treasury Note	Large
NBN	National Bank Note	Large
FRBN	Federal Reserve Bank Note	Large
FRN	Federal Reserve Note	Large
GC	Gold Certificate	Large
SSN	Small Size Banknote	Small

== People depicted ==
Each of the 53 individuals depicted on U.S. banknotes (not including fractional currency) is listed alphabetically with their most commonly associated titles, positions held, or affiliations (with dates). Elected and appointed government positions are fairly comprehensive and positions are presented in ascending chronological order.

People on United States banknotes
Name	Born	Died	Portrait (Note: Clicking on the majority of the portraits will reveal the entire note.)	Title/comments	U.S. Banknote(s)	IAD
John Quincy Adams	11 Jul 1767	23 Feb 1848		U.S. Minister to the Netherlands (1794–97), Prussia (1797–1801); State Senate (Massachusetts, 1802); U.S. Senate (Massachusetts, 1803–08); U.S. Minister to Russia (1809–14), Great Britain (1815–17); U.S. Secretary of State (1817–25); President of the United States (1825–29); U.S. House (Massachusetts, 1831–48).	LT $500 (1869)	1869
Thomas Hart Benton	14 Mar 1782	10 Apr 1858		U.S. Senate (Missouri, 1821–51); U.S. House (Missouri, 1853–55).	GC $100 (1870)	1870
Salmon Portland Chase	13 Jan 1808	7 May 1873		U.S. Senate (Ohio, 1849–55 & 1861); Governor (Ohio, 1856–60); U.S. Secretary of the Treasury (1861–64); Chief Justice of the United States (1864–73).	LT $1 (1862); CITN $10 (1863); IBN $10 (1864); IBN $1,000 (1861); FRN $10,000 (1918); SSN $10,000 (1928–34)	1861
William Clark	1 Aug 1770	1 Sep 1838		Explorer; Captain, U.S. Army (1789–96); Superintendent of Indian Affairs (1807–13 & 1822–38); Governor, Missouri Territory (1813–20).	LT $10 (1901)	1901
Henry Clay	12 Apr 1777	29 Jun 1852		State House (Kentucky, 1803); U.S. Senate (Kentucky, 1806–07 & 1810–11); Speaker of the House (1811–14, 1815–20, 1823–25); U.S. Secretary of State (1825–29); U.S. Senate (Kentucky, 1831–43 & 1849–52).	LT $50 (1869)	1869
Grover Cleveland	18 Mar 1837	24 Jun 1908		Governor (New York, 1883–85); President of the United States (1885–89, 1893–97).	FRBN $20 (1915); FRN $20 (1914); SSN $1,000 (1928–34)	1914
DeWitt Clinton	2 Mar 1769	11 Feb 1828		State House (New York, 1797–98); State Senate, (New York, 1798–1802 & 1805–11); U.S. Senate (New York, 1802–03); Mayor, New York City (1803–07, 1808-1810 & 1811–15); Lieutenant Governor (New York, 1811–13); Candidate for President (1812); Governor (New York, 1817–23, 1825–28).	LT $1,000 (1869)	1869
Stephen Decatur	5 Jan 1779	22 Mar 1820		Commodore, U.S. Navy; Quasi-War, First Barbary War; Awarded Congressional Gold Medal (1813).	SC $20 (1878)	1878
Edward Everett	11 Apr 1794	15 Jan 1865		U.S. House (Massachusetts, 1825–35); Governor (Massachusetts, 1836–40); U.S. Minister to Great Britain (1841–45); U.S. Secretary of State (1852–53); U.S. Senate (Massachusetts, 1853–54).	SC $50 (1878)	1878
David Glasgow Farragut	5 Jul 1801	14 Aug 1870		Admiral, Commander-in-Chief (1861–70), U.S. Navy (1810–1868); War of 1812, West Indies, American Civil War; Received Thanks of Congress (1862 & 1866).	TN $100 (1890)	1890
William Pitt Fessenden	16 Oct 1806	8 Sep 1869		State House (Maine, 1832, 1840, 1845–46, 1853–54); U.S. House (Maine, 1841–43); U.S. Senate (Maine, 1854–64); U.S. Secretary of the Treasury (1864–65).	NBN $20 (1882, reverse)	1882
Benjamin Franklin	17 Jan 1706	17 Apr 1790		Founder; Delegate, Pennsylvania, Continental Congress; U.S. Postmaster General (1775, Inaugural Holder); Signer, Declaration of Independence (1776); U.S. Minister to France (1778–85), Sweden (1782–83); President of Pennsylvania and Delegate to the Constitutional convention (1785–88); Delegate, Pennsylvania, U.S. Constitutional Convention (1787).	LT $50 (1874); RC $10 (1879); FRN $100 (1914); SSN $100 (1928–present)	1874
Robert Fulton	14 Nov 1765	24 Feb 1815		Engineer; Inventor	SC $2 (1896, reverse)	1896
Albert Gallatin	29 Jan 1761	12 Aug 1849		State House (Pennsylvania, 1790–92); U.S. Senate (Pennsylvania, 1793–94); U.S. House (Pennsylvania, 1795–1801); U.S. Secretary of the Treasury (1801–14); U.S. Minister to France (1815–23), Great Britain (1826–27).	LT $500 (1862)	1862
James Abram Garfield	19 Nov 1831	19 Sep 1881		State Senate, (Ohio, 1859–61); Major General, U.S. Army, (1861–63); U.S. House (Ohio, 1863–81); President of the United States (1881). Shot by Charles J. Guiteau on 2 July 1881.	NBN $5 (1882); GC $20 (1882)	1882
Ulysses S. Grant	27 Apr 1822	23 Jul 1885		Commanding General (1864–69), U.S. Army (1843–54, 1861–69 & 1877–85); U.S. Secretary of War, (Interim, 12 August 1867 – 12 January 1868); President of the United States (1869–77); Mexican–American War, American Civil War; Received Thanks of Congress (1863) and awarded The Congressional Gold Medal(1863).	SC $1 (1899); SC $5 (1886), (1896, reverse); FRBN $50 (1918); FRN $50 (1914); GC $50 (1913); SSN $50 (1928–present)	1886
Alexander Hamilton	11 Jan 1757	12 Jul 1804		Founder; Lieutenant Colonel, Continental Army (1775–); Continental Congress (1782–83); State House (New York, 1787); U.S. Secretary of the Treasury (1789–1795); Major General, Senior Officer, U.S. Army (1799–1800).	DN $5 (1861); LT $2 (1862); LT $5 (1862); LT $20 (1869); LT $50 (1862); CITN $50 (1863); IBN $50 (1864); IBN $500 (1864); FRN $1,000 (1918); GC $1,000 (1870); SSN $10 (1928–present)	1861
Winfield Scott Hancock	14 Feb 1824	9 Feb 1886		Major General (1866–1886), U.S. Army (1844–1886); Mexican–American War, American Civil War. Received Thanks of Congress (1866); Candidate for President (1880).	SC $2 (1886)	1886
Benjamin Harrison	20 Aug 1833	13 Mar 1901		Brigadier General, U.S. Army (1862–65); U.S. Senate (Indiana, 1881–87); President of the United States (1889–93).	NBN $5 (1902)	1902
Thomas Andrews Hendricks	7 Sep 1819	25 Nov 1885		State House (Indiana, 1848–49); U.S. House (Indiana, 1851–55); Assistant Treasurer of the United States (1853); U.S. Senate (Indiana, 1863–69); Governor (Indiana, 1873–77); Vice President of the United States (1885, Died in Office).	SC $10 (1886)	1886
Michael Hillegas	22 Apr 1729	29 Sep 1804		Provincial Assembly (Pennsylvania, 1765–75); Treasurer of the United States (1775–89, Inaugural Holder).	GC $10 (1907)	1907
Andrew Jackson	15 Mar 1767	8 Jun 1845		U.S. House (Tennessee, 1796–97); U.S. Senate (Tennessee, 1797–98); Judge, Tennessee Supreme Court (1798–1804); Major General, U.S. Army, Awarded Congressional Gold Medal(1815); Military Governor of Florida (10 March 1821 – 18 July 1821); U.S. Senate (Tennessee, 1823–25); President of the United States (1829–37). An assassination attempt (the first on a U.S. president) was made by Richard Lawrence on 30 January 1835 outside the Capitol building.	LT $5 (1869); LT $10,000 (1878); IBN $50 [Two-Year] (1861); FRBN $10 (1915); FRN $10 (1914); GC $10,000 (1870); SSN $20 (1928–present)	1861
Thomas Jefferson	13 Apr 1743	4 Jul 1826		Founder; House of Burgesses (Virginia, 1769); Delegate, Virginia Continental Congress (1775–76 & 1783–84); Signer, Declaration of Independence (1776); Governor (Virginia, 1779–81); U.S. Minister to France (1785–1789); U.S. Secretary of State (1790–1793, Inaugural Holder ); Candidate for President (1796); Vice President of the United States (1797–1801); President of the United States (1801–1809).	LT $2 (1869); FRBN $2 (1918); SSN $2 (1928–present)	1869
John Jay Knox Jr.	19 Mar 1828	12 Feb 1892		Comptroller of the Currency, Department of the Treasury (1872–84).	NBN $100 (1902)	1902
Meriwether Lewis	18 Aug 1774	11 Oct 1809		Explorer; Governor, Louisiana/Missouri Territory (1807–09).	LT $10 (1901)	1901
Abraham Lincoln	12 Feb 1809	15 Apr 1865		State House (Illinois, 1834–41); U.S. House (Illinois, 1847–49); President of the United States (1861–65). Assassinated by John Wilkes Booth on 15 April 1865.	DN $1 (1861); LT $10 (1862); LT $100 (1869); CITN $20 (1863); IBN $20 (1864); SC $1 (1899); SC $5 (1923); FRBN $5 (1915); FRN $5 (1914); GC $500 (1870); SSN $5 (1928–present)	1861
James Madison	16 Mar 1751	28 Jun 1836		Founder; Member, First General Assembly of Virginia (1776); Delegate, Virginia, Continental Congress (1780–83 & 1786–88); Virginia House of Delegates (1783–86); U.S. Constitutional Convention (1787); U.S. House (Virginia, 1789–97); U.S. Secretary of State (1801–09); President of the United States (1809–17).	LT $5,000 (1878); FRN $5,000 (1918); GC $5,000 (1870); SSN $5,000 (1928–34)	1870
Daniel Manning	16 May 1831	24 Dec 1887		U.S. Secretary of the Treasury (1885–87)	SC $20 (1886)	1886
Joseph King Fenno Mansfield	22 Dec 1803	18 Sep 1862		Major General (1862), U.S. Army (1822–62); Mexican–American War, American Civil War.	LT $500 (1874)	1874
William Learned Marcy	12 Dec 1786	4 Jul 1857		Adjutant General, New York State Militia (1821–23); New York State Comptroller (1823); Judge, New York Supreme Court (1829–31); U.S. Senate (New York, 1831–33); Governor (New York, 1833–39); Commissioner of Mexican Claims (1839–42); U.S. Secretary of War (1845–49); U.S. Secretary of State (1853–57).	SC $1,000 (1878)	1878
John Marshall	24 Sep 1755	6 Jul 1835		Captain, Continental Army (1776–81); Virginia General Assembly (1782–91, 1797); U.S. Minister to France (1797); U.S. House (Virginia, 1799–1800); U.S. Secretary of State (1800–01); Chief Justice of the United States (1801–35).	TN $20 (1890); FRN $500 (1918)	1890
Hugh McCulloch	7 Dec 1801	24 May 1895		Comptroller of the Currency (1863–65); U.S. Secretary of the Treasury (1865–69 & 1884–85).	NBN $20 (1902)	1902
William McKinley	29 Jan 1843	14 Sep 1901		Major, U.S. Army (1861–65); U.S. House (Ohio, 1877–84 & 1885–91); Governor (Ohio, 1892–96); President of the United States (1897–1901). Shot by Leon Czolgosz on 6 September 1901.	NBN $10 (1902); SSN $500 (1928–34)	1902
James Birdseye McPherson	14 Nov 1828	22 Jul 1864		Major General (1862–64), U.S. Army (1853–64), American Civil War; Killed in battle.	TN $2 (1890)	1890
George Gordon Meade	31 Dec 1815	6 Nov 1872		Major General (1862–69), U.S. Army (1835–69); Mexican–American War, American Civil War; Received Thanks of Congress (1864).	TN $1,000 (1890)	1890
James Monroe	28 Apr 1758	4 Jul 1831		Major, Continental Army (1776–79); Colonel, Virginia State Militia (1780); Continental Congress (1783–1786); State House (Virginia, 1786 & 1810–11); U.S. Senate (Virginia, 1790–1794); U.S. Minister to France (1794–96); Governor (Virginia, 1799–1802 & 1811); U.S. Minister to Great Britain (1803–1807); U.S. Secretary of State (1811–1814 and 1815–1817); U.S. Secretary of War (Interim, 27 August 1814 – 15 March 1815); President of the United States (1817–1825).	SC $100 (1878)	1878
Robert Morris	31 Jan 1734	8 May 1806		Founder; Delegate, Pennsylvania, Continental Congress (1776); Signer, Declaration of Independence (1776); State House (Pennsylvania, 1778–1781 and 1785–1787); United States Superintendent of Finance (1781–84).	LT $1,000 (1862); SC $10 (1878)	1862
Samuel Finley Breese Morse	27 Apr 1791	2 Apr 1872		Inventor, Morse Telegraph; Co-Inventor, Morse Code; Painter.	SC $2 (1896, reverse)	1896
Running Antelope	c.1821	c.1896		Sioux Chief of the Hunkpapa	SC $5 (1899)	1899
Winfield Scott	13 Jun 1786	29 May 1866		Commanding General (1841–61), U.S. Army (1808–61); War of 1812, Seminole Wars, Black Hawk War, Mexican–American War, American Civil War; Military Governor, Mexico City (1847–48); U.S. Secretary of War (Interim, 24 July 1850 – 15 August 1850); Candidate for President (1852). Awarded Congressional Gold Medal (1814 and 1848).	IBN $500 [Two-Year] (1861); IBN $100 [Three-Year] (1864)	1861
William Henry Seward	16 May 1801	16 Oct 1872		State Senate (New York, 1831–34); Governor (New York, 1839–43); U.S. Senate (New York, 1849–61); U.S. Secretary of State (1861–69). An assassination attempt was made by Lewis Powell, a co-conspirator of John Wilkes Booth, the same night President Lincoln was shot (15 April 1865).	TN $50 (1891)	1891
Philip Henry Sheridan	6 Mar 1831	5 Aug 1888		Commanding General (1883–88), U.S. Army (1853–88); American Civil War, Indian Wars. Received Thanks of Congress (1865).	SC $5 (1896, reverse); TN $10 (1890)	1890
John Sherman	10 May 1823	22 Oct 1900		U.S. House (Ohio, 1855–61); U.S. Senate (Ohio, 1861–77 & 1881–97); President pro tem, U.S. Senate (1885–87); U.S. Secretary of the Treasury (1877–81); U.S. Secretary of State (1897–98).	NBN $50 (1902)	1902
William Tecumseh Sherman	8 Feb 1820	14 Feb 1891		U.S. Secretary of War (Interim, 9 September 1869 – 18 October 1869); Commanding General (1869–83), U.S. Army (1840–84); American Civil War, Indian Wars. Received Thanks of Congress (1864 & 1865).	TN $500 (1891)	1891
Edwin McMasters Stanton	19 Dec 1814	24 Dec 1869		U.S. Attorney General (1860–61); U.S. Secretary of War (1862–68); U.S. Supreme Court (appointed 1869, died before taking office).	TN $1 (1890)	1890
Charles Sumner	6 Jan 1811	11 Mar 1874		U.S. Senate (Massachusetts, 1851–74).	SC $500 (1878)	1878
George H. Thomas	31 Jul 1816	28 Mar 1870		Major General (1864–70), U.S. Army (1840–70); Mexican–American War, American Civil War. Received Thanks of Congress (1865).	TN $5 (1890)	1890
George Washington	22 Feb 1732	14 Dec 1799		Founder; Virginia House of Burgesses (1758–75); Delegate, VA, Continental Congress (1774–75); Commander-in-Chief, Continental Army (1775–83); Member, U.S. Constitutional Convention (1787); President of the United States (1789–97); Lieutenant General, Commander of the United States Army (1798–99).	LT $1 (1869); CITN $100 (1863); IBN $100 (1864); IBN $1,000 [Two-Year] (1861); IBN $500 [Three-Year] (1861); SC $1 (1896, reverse); SC $1 (1923); SC $2 (1899); FRBN $1 (1918); GC $20 (1905); SSN $1 (1928–present)	1861
Martha Washington	2 Jun 1731	22 May 1802		First Lady of the United States (1789–97).	SC $1 (1886); SC $1 (1896, reverse)	1886
Daniel Webster	18 Jan 1782	24 Oct 1852		U.S. House (New Hampshire, 1813–17); U.S. House (Massachusetts, 1823–27); U.S. Senate (Massachusetts, 1827–41 & 1845–50); Candidate for President (1836); U.S. Secretary of State (1841–43 & 1850–52).	LT $10 (1869)	1869
Woodrow Wilson	28 Dec 1856	3 Feb 1924		Governor (New Jersey, 1911–13); President of the United States (1913–21). Recipient of the Nobel Peace Prize (1919).	SSN $100,000 (1934)	1934
William Windom	10 May 1827	29 Jan 1891		U.S. House (Minnesota, 1859–69); U.S. Senate (Minnesota, 1870–71, 1871–81 & 1881–83); U.S. Secretary of the Treasury (1881, 1889–91).	SC $2 (1891)	1891
Silas Wright Jr.	24 May 1795	27 Aug 1847		U.S. House (New York, 1827–29 & 1829–30); U.S. Senate (New York, 1833–44); Governor (New York, 1845–47).	GC $50 (1882)	1882

== Summary of titles/positions ==
Below is a summary of the titles/positions held, at one time or another, by the 53 individuals depicted on United States banknotes from 1861 to the present. The list of positions is not exhaustive, but does address the central elected federal and state officials, members of the president's cabinet, military figureheads, and several of the founders and framers of the United States government.

Fifty-three people held at least 132 elected and appointed positions for a cumulative total of over 763 years of public service.

Summary of titles/positions held
Position/title	No. people
President of the United States	13
Vice President	2
Speaker of the House	1
President pro tem	1
Secretary of State	11
Secretary of the Treasury	8
Secretary of War	3
Attorney General	1
United States Senate	20
United States House	17
State Senate	6
State House	11
Governor	15
Delegate, Continental Congress	7
Signer, Declaration of Independence	3
Member, U.S. Constitutional Convention	5
Commanding General	6
Supreme Court	2
