= Treasury Note (disambiguation) =

Treasury Note may refer to any of the following obligations of the United States or United Kingdom.

Most commonly it refers to the US Treasury note, debt obligations currently issued by the US Treasury which mature between one and ten years and pay coupons every six months.

It also refers to the following instruments which are no longer issued:

- Treasury Note (19th century), short term debt obligations that were neither legal tender nor representative money but sometimes functioned as paper money
- Treasury Note (1890–1891), known as coin notes, paper money issued under authority of the Sherman Silver Purchase Act and redeemable in silver or gold
- HM Treasury banknotes issued between 1914 and 1928 by the British Treasury
- United States Note, non-interest paying legal tender paper money issued without specific specie-backing
- Interest bearing note, a grouping of Civil War-era interest-paying short term debt obligations
- Compound interest treasury note, Civil War-era short term debt obligations that had legal tender status and paid compounded interest at the end of three years
