= United States ten-dollar bill =

Current denomination of United States currency

Ten dollars
- Country: United States
- Value: $10
- Width: 156 mm
- Height: 66.3 mm
- Weight: Approx. 1 g
- Security features: Security fibers, security thread, watermark, color shifting ink, microprinting, raised printing, EURion constellation
- Material used: 75% cotton 25% linen
- Years of printing: 1861–present

Obverse
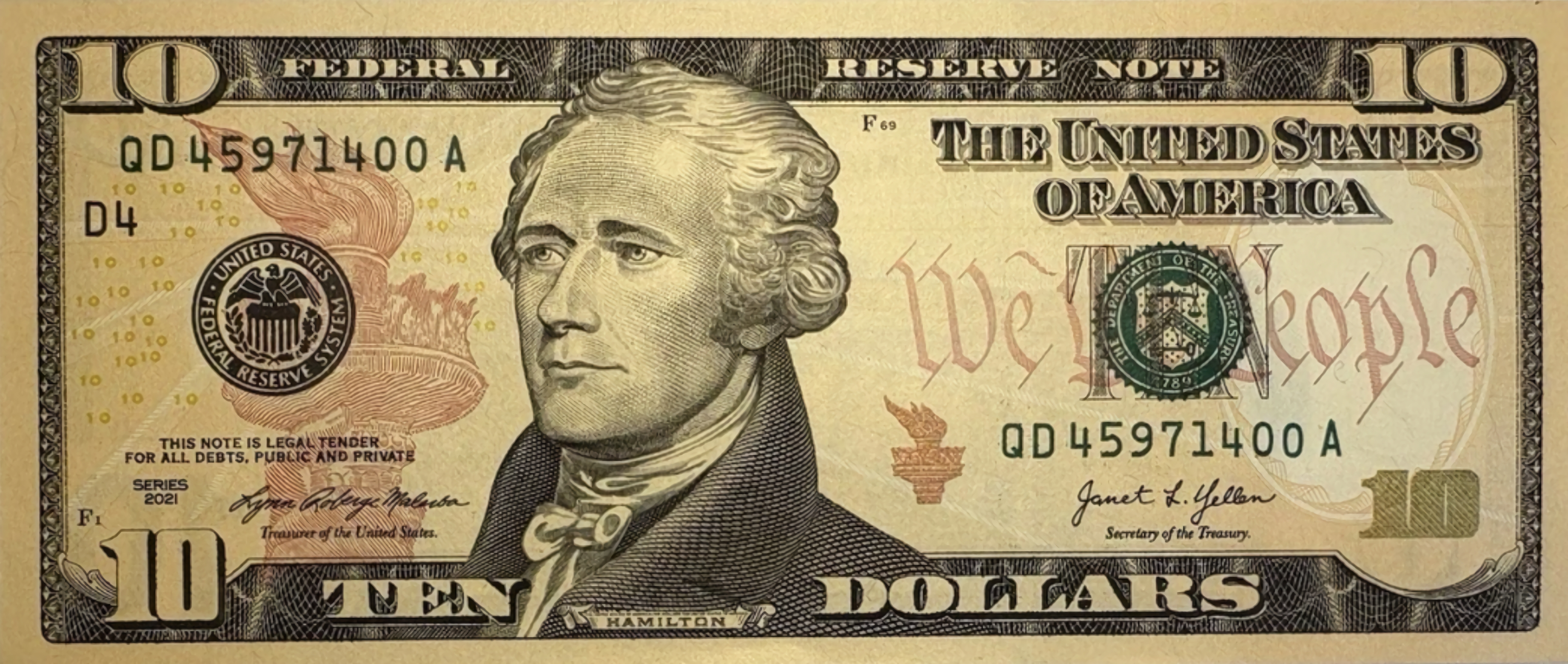
- Design: Alexander Hamilton
- Design date: 2004

Reverse
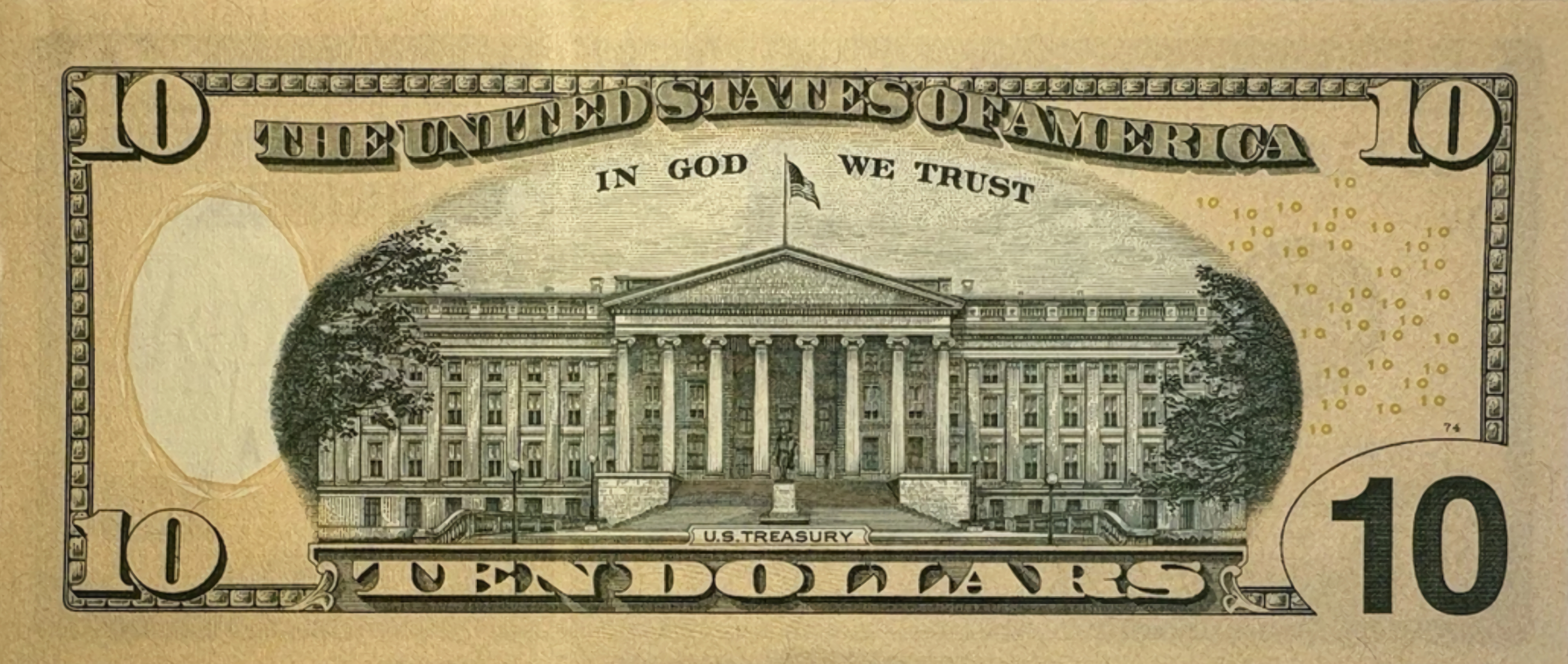
- Design: U.S. Treasury Building
- Design date: 2004

The United States ten-dollar bill (US$10) is a denomination of U.S. currency. The obverse of the bill features the portrait of Alexander Hamilton, who served as the first U.S. secretary of the treasury, two renditions of the torch of the Statue of Liberty (Liberty Enlightening the World), and the words "We the People" from the original engrossed preamble of the United States Constitution. The reverse features the U.S. Treasury Building. All $10 bills issued today are Federal Reserve Notes.

As of December 2018, the average life of a $10 bill in circulation is 5.3 years before it is replaced due to wear. Ten-dollar bills are delivered by Federal Reserve Banks bound with yellow straps.

The source of Hamilton's portrait on the $10 bill is John Trumbull's 1805 painting that belongs to the portrait collection of New York City Hall. The $10 bill is unique in that it is the only denomination in circulation in which the portrait faces to the left. It also features one of two non-presidents on currently issued U.S. bills, the other being Benjamin Franklin on the $100 bill. Hamilton is also the only person not born in the continental United States or British America (he was from the West Indies) currently depicted on U.S. paper currency; three others have been depicted in the past: Albert Gallatin, Switzerland ($500 1862/63 Legal Tender), George Meade, Spain ($1,000 1890/91 Treasury Note), and Robert Morris, England ($1,000 1862/63 Legal Tender; $10 1878/80 Silver Certificate).

== Large size note history ==
(approximately 7.4218 × 3.125 in ≅ 189 × 79 mm)

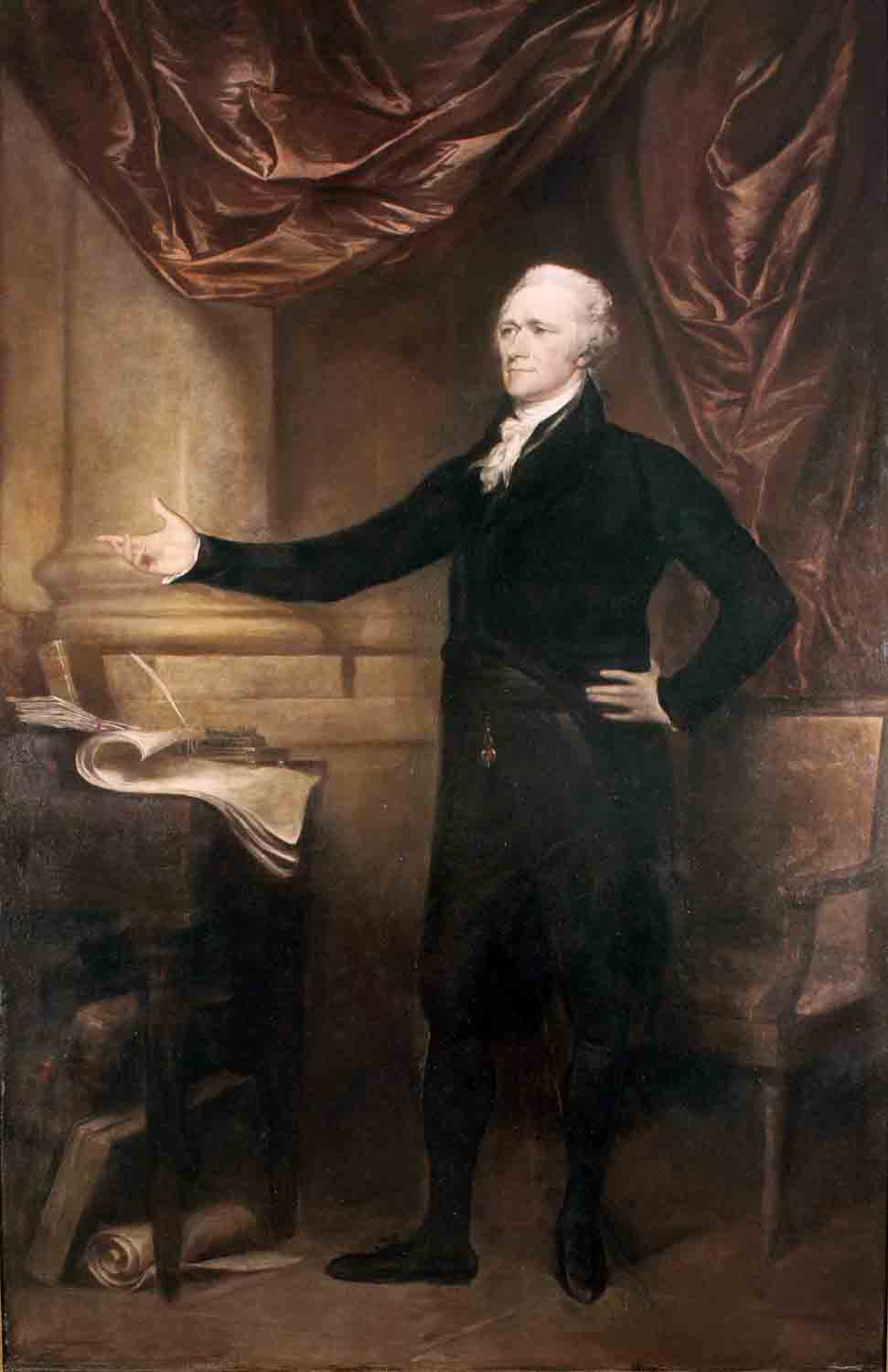
1805 portrait of Hamilton by John Trumbull

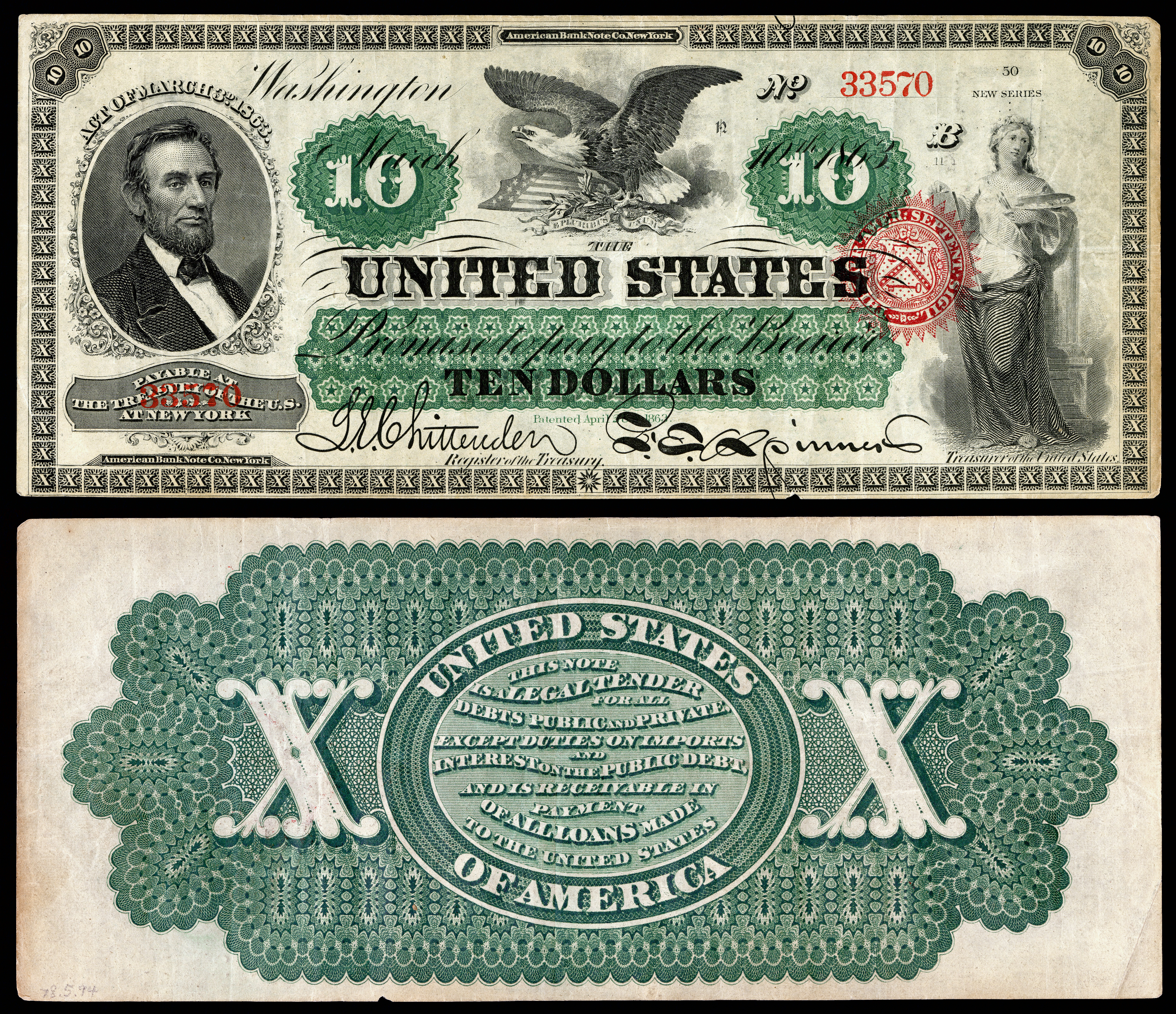
1863 $10 Legal Tender note (also known as a "sawbuck") featuring then-current U.S. president Abraham Lincoln

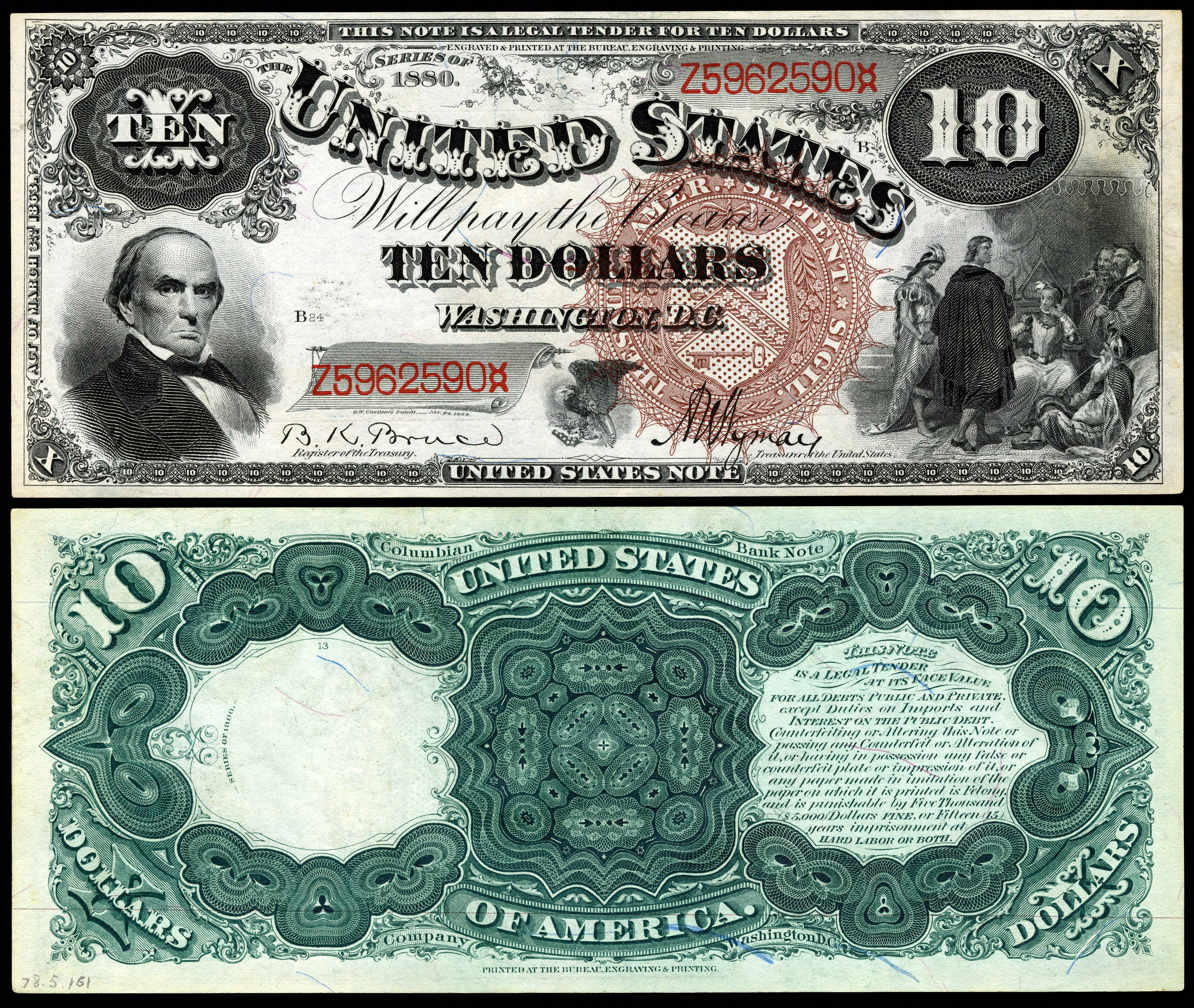
1880 $10 Legal Tender depicting Daniel Webster

- 1861: The first $10 bill was issued as a Demand Note with a small portrait of Abraham Lincoln on the left side of the obverse and an allegorical figure representing art on the right.
- 1862: The first $10 United States Note was issued with a face design similar to the 1861 Demand Note; the reverse, however, was somewhat revised. The Roman numeral "X" may represent the origin of the slang term "sawbuck" to mean a $10 bill.
- 1863: Interest Bearing Notes, featuring a portrait of Salmon P. Chase and vignette of liberty, were issued that could be redeemed one year after the date printed on the bill for $10 plus 5% interest. The notes could also be spent for exactly $10.
- 1864: Compound Interest Treasury Notes, with a face design similar to the 1863 Interest Bearing Note, were issued that grew in face value 6% compounded semi-annually. It is unknown if the note could actually be spent for $10 plus interest.
- 1869: A new $10 United States Note was issued with a portrait of Daniel Webster on the left and an allegorical representation of Pocahontas being presented to the Royal Court of England on the right side of the obverse. This note is nicknamed a "jackass note" because the eagle on the front looks like a donkey when the note is turned upside down.
- 1870: National Gold Bank Notes, featuring a vignette of Benjamin Franklin flying a kite on the left and liberty and an eagle on the right, were issued specifically for payment in gold coin by participating national banks. The back of the bill featured a vignette of U.S. gold coins.

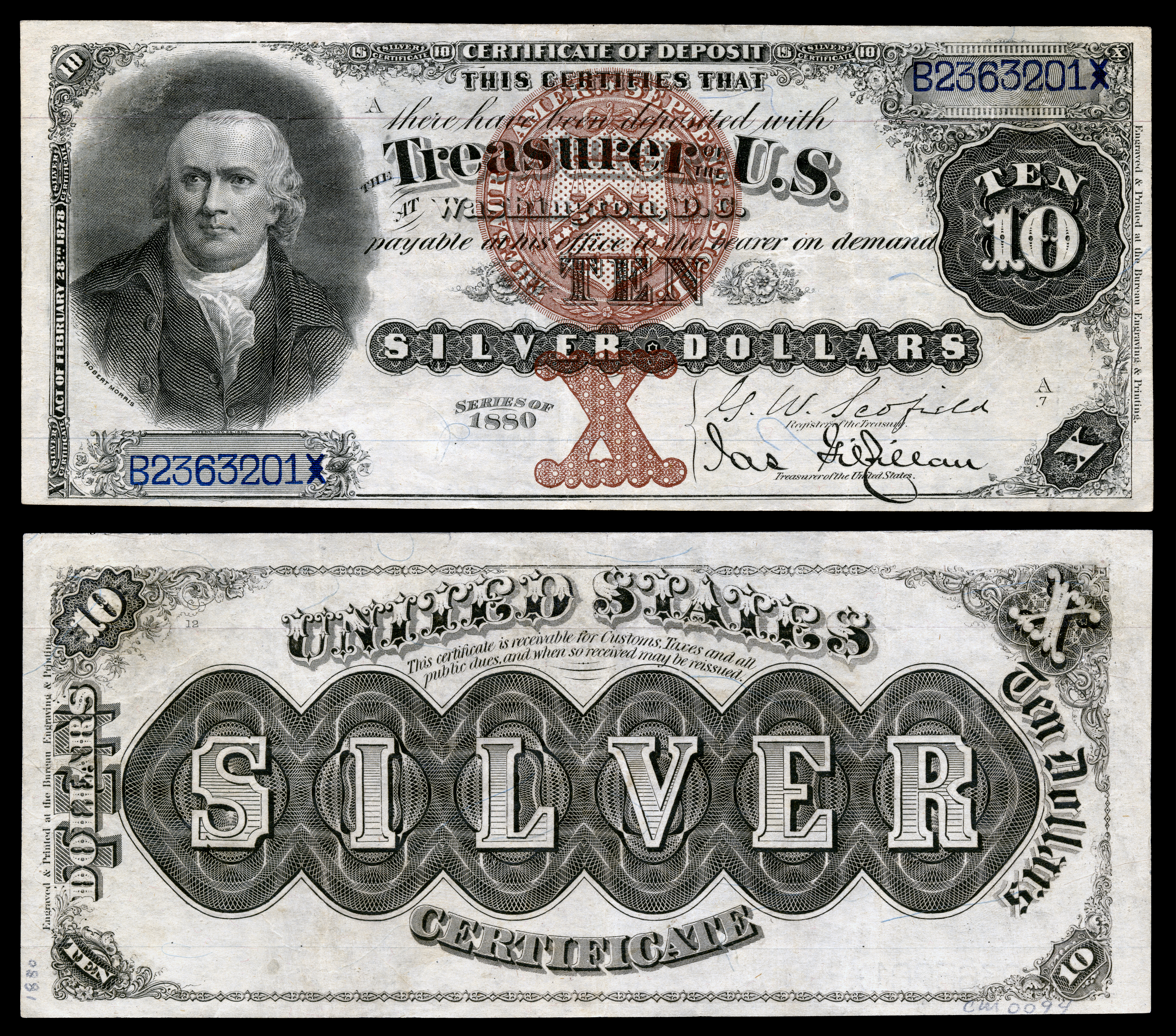
Series 1880 $10 silver certificate featuring Robert Morris

- 1875: The 1869 United States Note was revised. The blue and green tinting that was present on the obverse was removed and the design on the reverse was completely changed.
- 1878: The first $10 silver certificate was issued with a portrait of Robert Morris on the left side of the obverse. The reverse, unlike any other federally issued note, was printed in black ink and featured the word SILVER in large block letters.
- 1879: Refunding Certificates were issued that paid 4% interest annually.
- 1886: A new $10 silver certificate with a portrait of Thomas A. Hendricks was issued.
- 1890: Ten-dollar Treasury or "Coin Notes" were issued and given for government purchases of silver bullion from the silver mining industry. The note featured a portrait of General Philip Sheridan. The reverse featured an ornate design that took up almost the entire note.
- 1891: The reverse of the 1890 Treasury Note was redesigned because the treasury felt that it was too "busy" which would make it too easy to counterfeit.

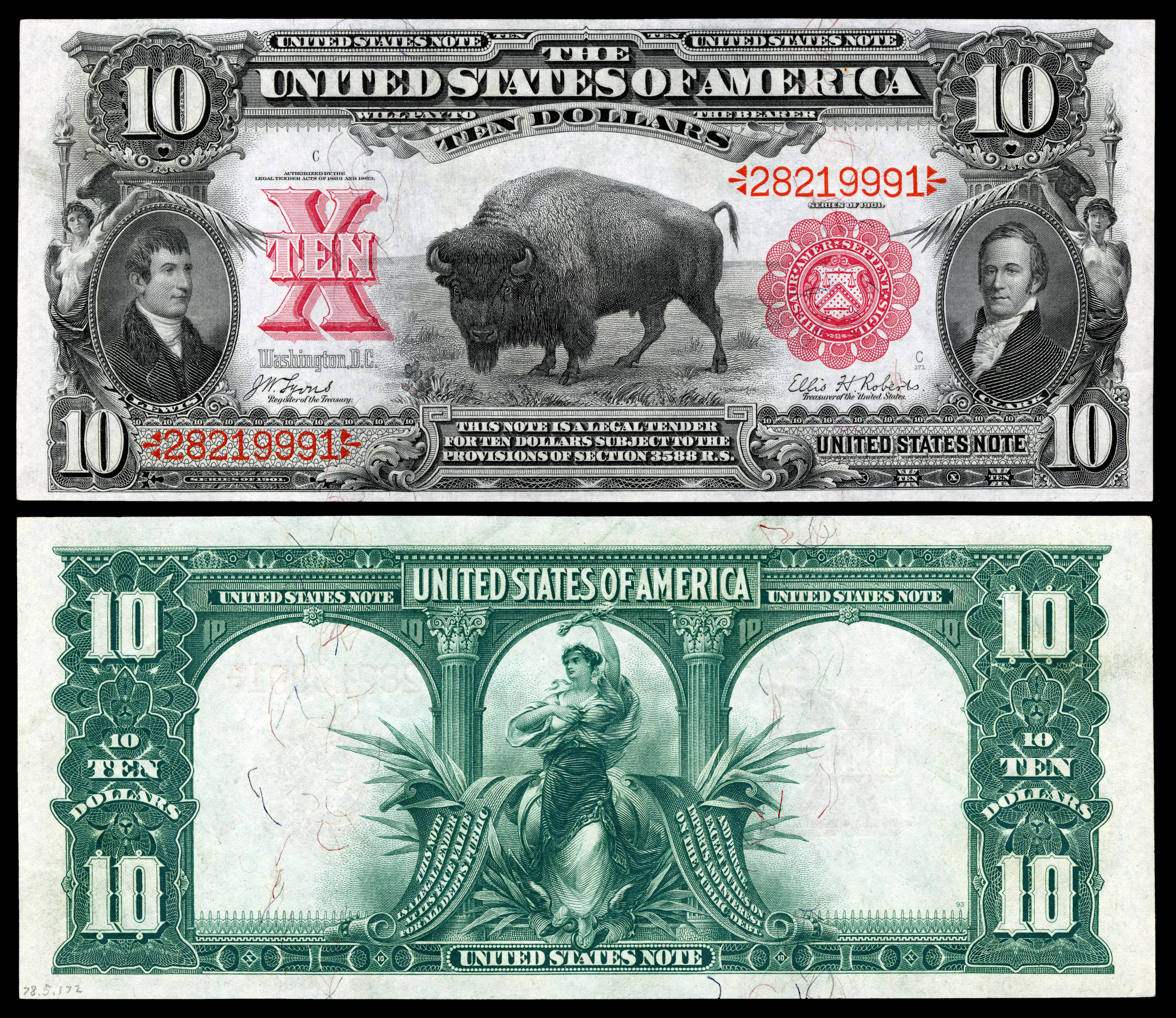
Series 1901 $10 Legal Tender depicting military explorers Meriwether Lewis, William Clark, and an American bison

- 1901: The famous United States Note featuring portraits of Meriwether Lewis on the left, William Clark on the right, and an American bison which is sometimes erroneously noted as being Black Diamond, the Bison which was depicted on the reverse of the Indian Head Nickel. This United States Note was the only one to mention the legal provision that authorized its issuance. The reverse featured an allegorical figure representing Columbia between two Roman-styled pillars.
- 1902: A new National Banknote was issued featuring a former president William McKinley, who was assassinated a year earlier. It had a blue seal, and a woman on the reverse.
- 1907: Congress officially ended the interest paid on Refunding Certificates, forever making their face value $21.30.
- 1907: The first $10 gold certificate with a portrait of Michael Hillegas on the front and orange-colored back was issued.
- 1914: The first $10 Federal Reserve Note was issued with a portrait of Andrew Jackson on the obverse and vignettes of farming and industry on the reverse. The note initially had a red treasury seal and serial numbers; however, they were changed to blue.

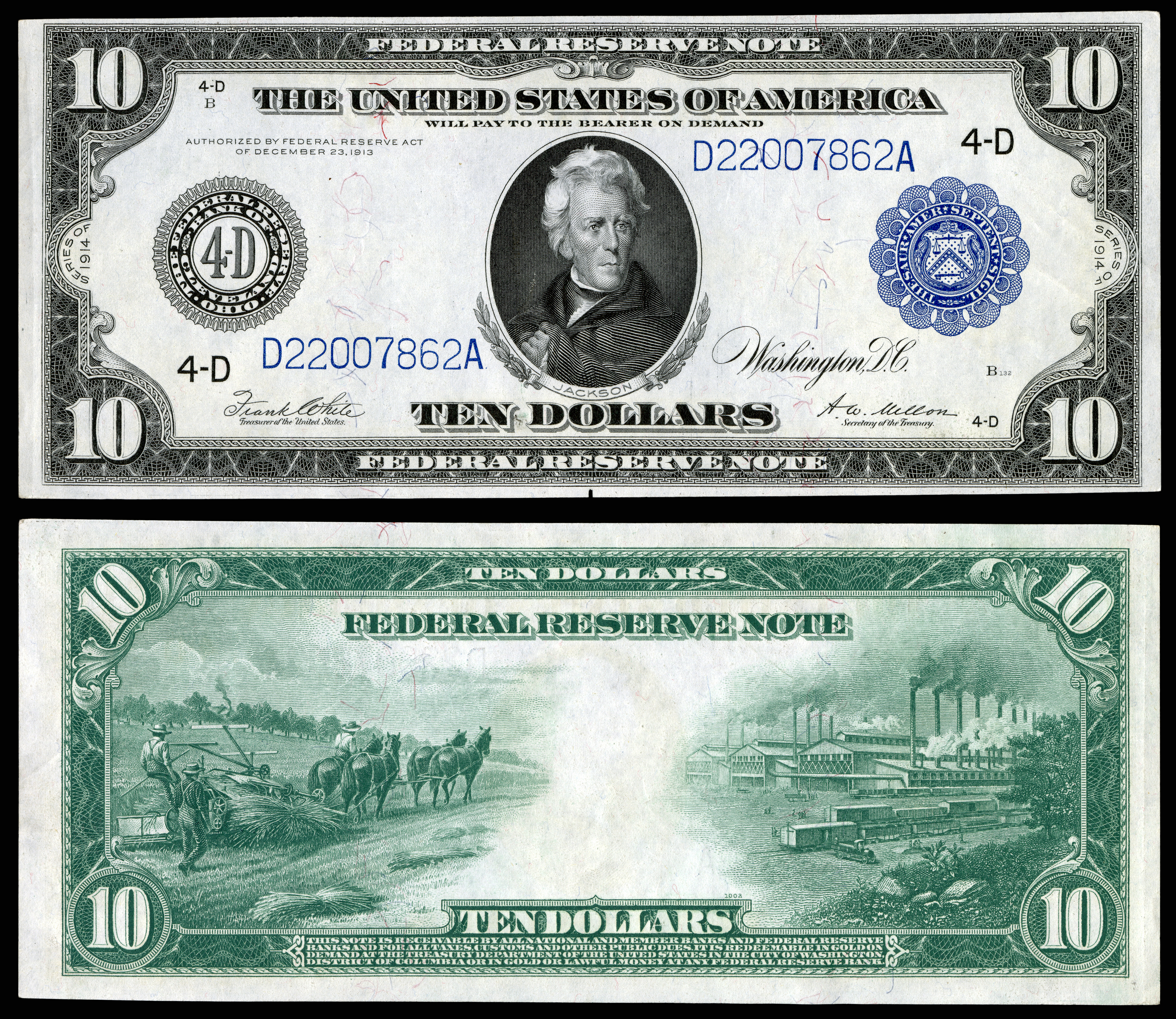
1914 $10 Federal Reserve Note featuring Andrew Jackson

- 1915: Federal Reserve Bank Notes (not to be confused with Federal Reserve Notes) were issued by four individual Federal Reserve banks. The obverse was similar to the 1914 Federal Reserve notes except for large wording in the middle of the bill and a portrait with no border on the left side of the bill. Each note was an obligation of the issuing bank and could only be redeemed at the corresponding bank.
- 1918: The 1915 Federal Reserve Bank Note was re-issued under series of 1918 by four Federal Reserve banks.
- 1923: The $10 United States Note was redesigned with a portrait of Andrew Jackson. Some of the design aspects of this note, such as the bottom border and numeral 10 overprinted with the word TEN, were transferred over to the series of 1928 $10 bill.

== Small size note history ==
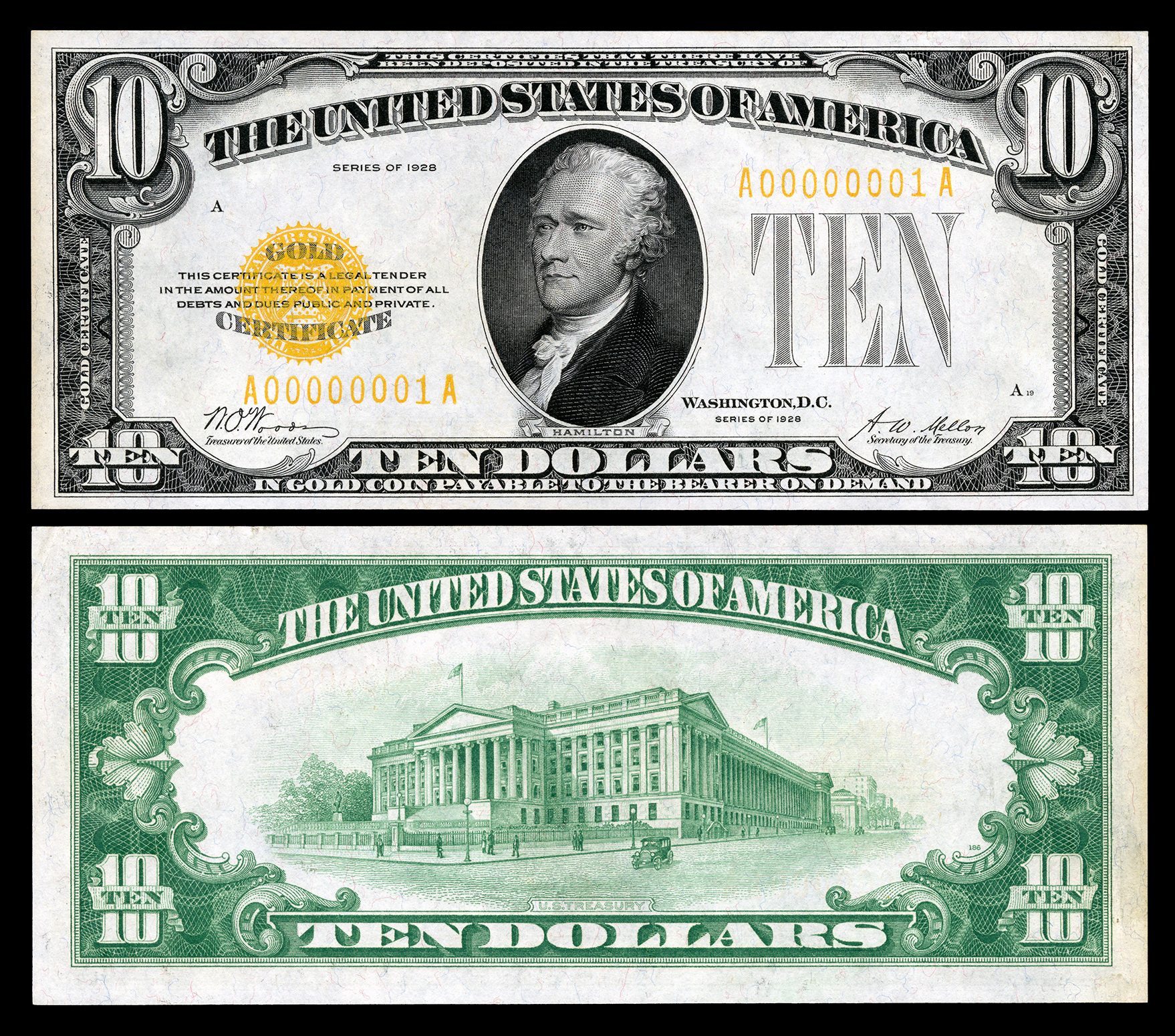
Series 1928 $10 Gold Certificate

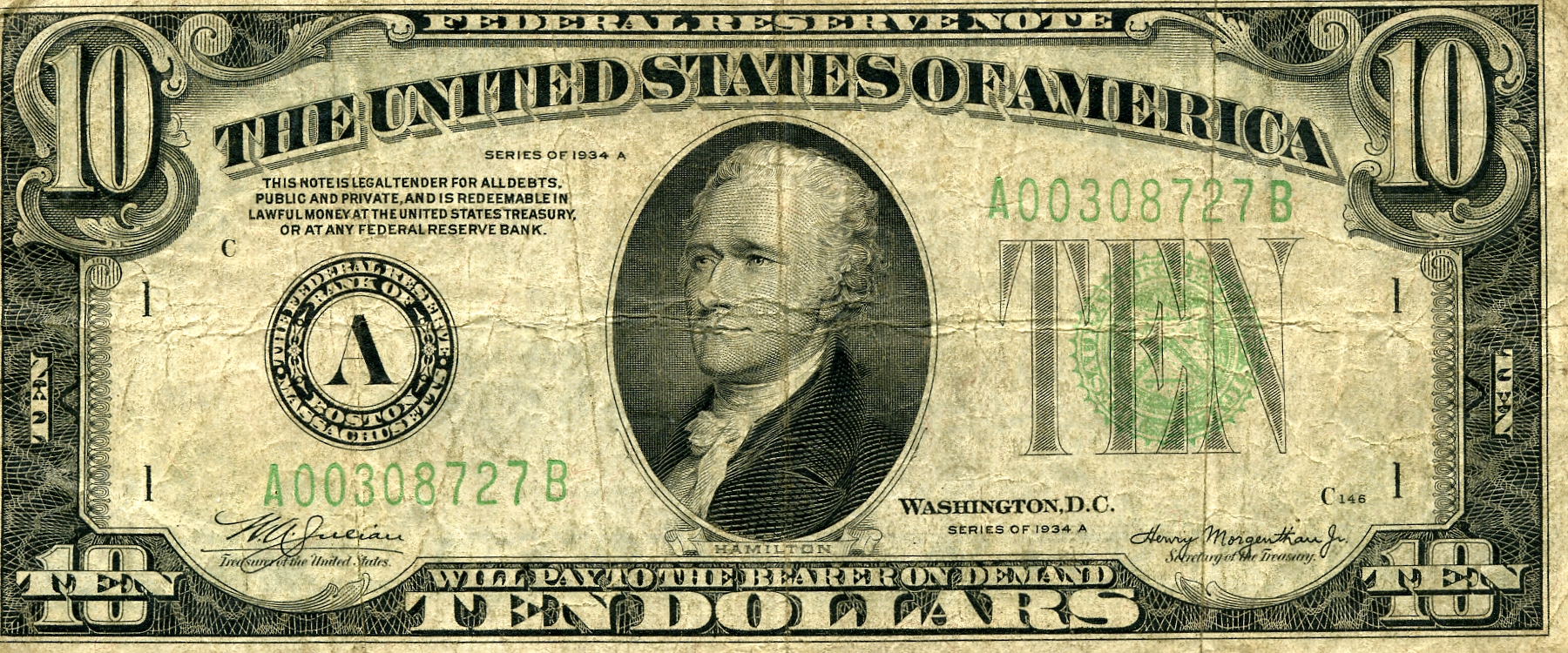
1934 A Federal Reserve $10 Note

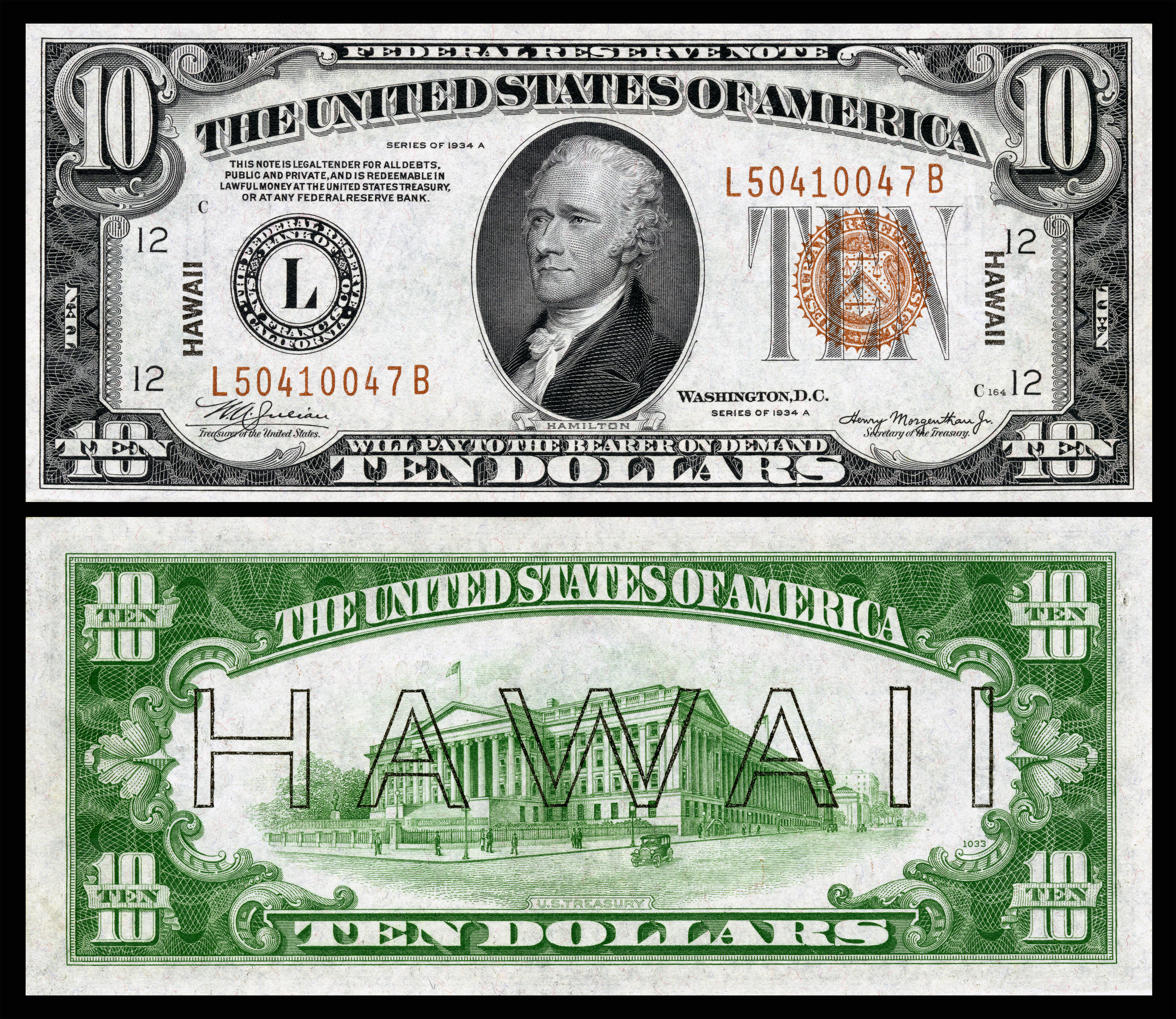
Hawaii overprint note

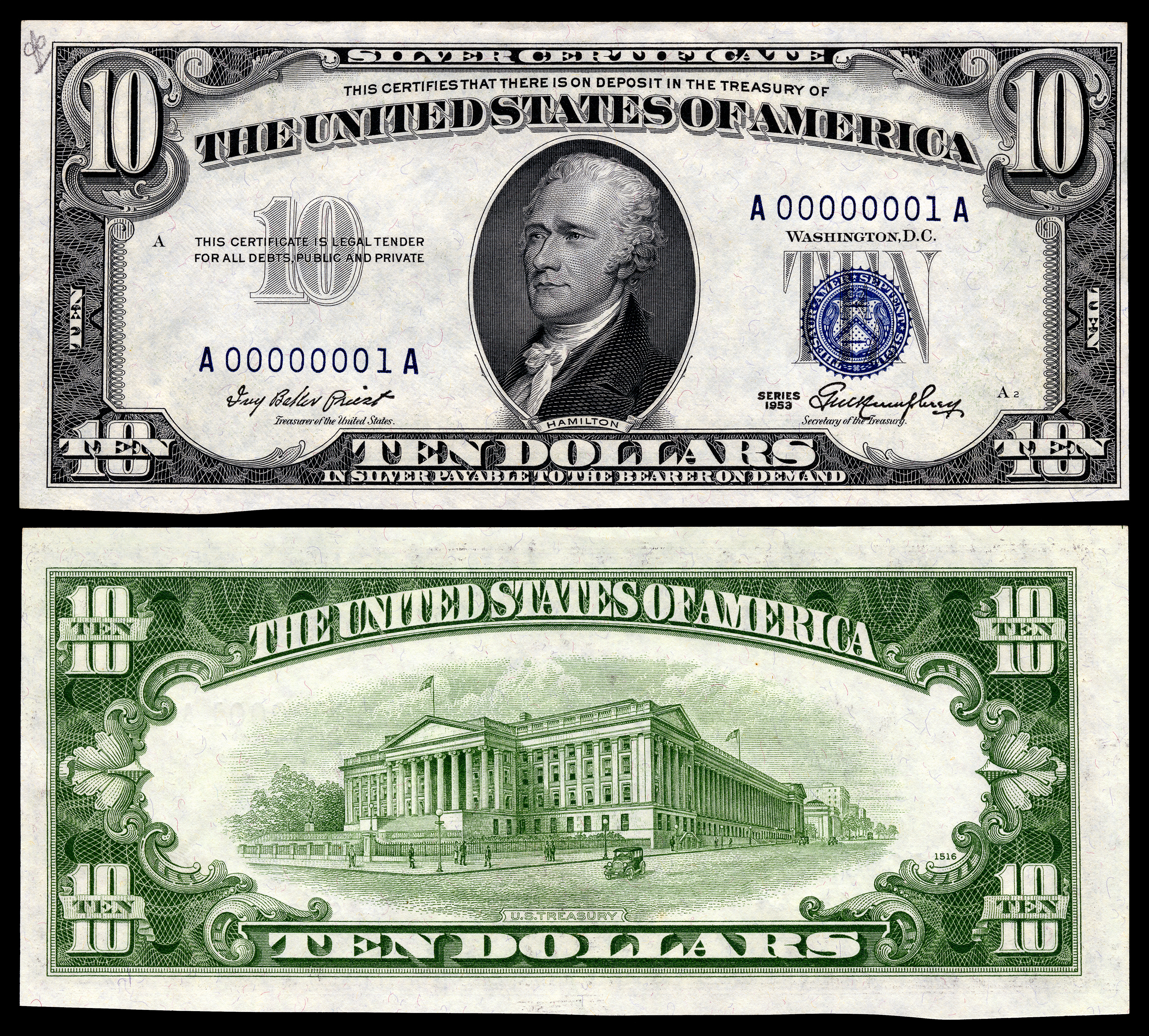
The first 1953 $10 Silver Certificate printed (Smithsonian)

(6.14 in × 2.61 in ≅ 156 mm × 66 mm)

- 1929: Under the Series of 1928, all U.S. currency was changed to its current size. All variations of the $10 bill would carry the same portrait of Alexander Hamilton, same border design on the obverse, and the same reverse with a vignette of the U.S. Treasury building. The $10 bill was issued as a Federal Reserve Note with a green seal and serial numbers and as a gold certificate with a golden seal and serial numbers. The car parked outside of the Treasury Department building is based on a number of different cars manufactured at the time and was the creation of the Bureau designer who developed the artwork that served as a model for the engraving, because government agencies were prohibited from endorsing any specific manufacturer or product, according to a bureau of engraving and printing pamphlet. The tiny building to the right rear of the treasury building is the American Security and Trust Company Building, which for some years advertised itself as "right on the money".
- 1933: As an emergency response to the Great Depression, additional money was pumped into the American economy through Federal Reserve Bank Notes. This was the only small-sized $10 bill that had a different border design on the obverse. The serial numbers and seal on it were brown.
- 1933: The first small sized $10 silver certificates were issued with a blue seal and serial numbers. The obverse had a similar design style to the 1928 $1 Silver Certificates; however, phrasing on the $10 bill was different from the $1 bill. This issue, with the series date of 1933, was not widely released into general circulation. Surviving examples of these notes are quite rare and valued at $10,000 to $30,000 in the numismatic community depending on their condition.
- 1934: The redeemable in gold clause was removed from Federal Reserve Notes due to the U.S. withdrawing from the gold standard.
- 1934: The $10 Silver Certificate was redesigned with a blue numeral 10 on the left side of the obverse and the treasury seal printed over the gray word TEN on the right. Phrasing on the certificate was changed to reflect the American Silver Purchase Act of 1934.
- 1942: Special World War II currency was issued. HAWAII was overprinted on the front and back of the $10 Federal Reserve Note, and the seal and serial numbers were changed to brown. This was done so that the currency could be declared worthless in case of Japanese invasion. A $10 Silver Certificate was printed with a yellow instead of blue treasury seal; these notes were given to U.S. troops in North Africa. These notes, too, could be declared worthless if seized by the enemy.
- 1950: Many minor aspects on the obverse of the $10 Federal Reserve Note were changed. Most noticeably, the treasury seal, gray word TEN, and the Federal Reserve Seal were made smaller, the words WASHINGTON, D.C. were added between them and the serial number; also, the Federal Reserve seal had spikes added around it, like the Treasury seal.
- 1953: The $10 silver certificate had several design changes analogous to the 1950 Federal Reserve Note design changes; also, the blue numeral 10 on the left side of the bill was changed to gray.
- 1963: WILL PAY TO THE BEARER ON DEMAND was removed from the obverse and IN GOD WE TRUST was added to the reverse of the $10 Federal Reserve Notes. Also, the obligation was shortened to its current wording, THIS NOTE IS LEGAL TENDER FOR ALL DEBTS, PUBLIC AND PRIVATE. Also during this time, production of Silver Certificates ends.
- 1969: The $10 bill began using the new treasury seal with wording in English that simply says, "The Department of the Treasury", instead of Latin "THESAUR. AMER. SEPTENT. SIGIL.", "Seal of the Treasury of North America."
- 1981: During production of Series 1977A, a few star notes from the Richmond FRB were made on experimental Natick paper, in the only experimental note series not involving the $1 bill.
- 1992: The first modern anti-counterfeiting measures were introduced with microscopic printing around Hamilton's portrait and a plastic security strip on the left side of the bill. Even though the notes read Series 1990, the first bills were printed in July 1992.
- 1995: The first notes (for Series 1995) at the Western Currency Facility begin printing in November.
- May 24, 2000: To combat evolving counterfeiting, a new $10 bill, the first complete redesign since 1929, was issued under Series 1999 whose design was similar in style to the $100, $50, $20, and $5 bills that had all undergone previous design changes as part of the "New Currency Design" program. The major changes were a revised, larger, slightly off-center portrait of Hamilton and a revised vignette of the U.S. Treasury building, now positioned face-on. The plastic security strip reads "USA TEN" and now glows orange under a black light. Like the new $5, the bills were first printed in December 1999.
- March 2, 2006: The $10 was the third bill to be modified as part of the "NexGen" redesign series. In addition to design changes introduced in 2000, the obverse features red background images of the Statue of Liberty's torch, a rendition of Jacob Shallus's engrossing of WE THE PEOPLE from the Preamble to the United States Constitution, a smaller metallic representation of the Statue of Liberty's torch, orange and yellow background color, a borderless portrait of Hamilton, and to the left of Hamilton small yellow 10s whose zeros form the EURion constellation. The reverse features small yellow EURion 10s and have the fine lines removed from around the vignette of the United States Treasury building. These notes were issued in series 2004A with Cabral-Snow signatures. The first notes were printed in July 2005.

=== Series dates ===
==== Small size ====
Type	Series	Register	Treasurer	Seal
National Bank Note Types 1 & 2	1929	Jones	Woods	Brown
Federal Reserve Bank Note	1928A	Jones	Woods	Brown

Type	Series	Treasurer	Secretary	Seal
Gold Certificate	1928	Woods	Mellon	Gold
Silver Certificate	1933	Julian	Woodin	Blue
Silver Certificate	1934	Julian	Morgenthau	Blue
Silver Certificate	1934 North Africa	Julian	Morgenthau	Yellow
Silver Certificate	1934A	Julian	Morgenthau	Blue
Silver Certificate	1934A North Africa	Julian	Morgenthau	Yellow
Silver Certificate	1934B	Julian	Vinson	Blue
Silver Certificate	1934C	Julian	Snyder	Blue
Silver Certificate	1934D	Clark	Snyder	Blue
Silver Certificate	1953	Priest	Humphrey	Blue
Silver Certificate	1953A	Priest	Anderson	Blue
Silver Certificate	1953B	Smith	Dillon	Blue
Federal Reserve Note	1928	Tate	Mellon	Green
Federal Reserve Note	1928A	Woods	Mellon	Green
Federal Reserve Note	1928B	Woods	Mellon	Green
Federal Reserve Note	1928C	Woods	Mills	Green
Federal Reserve Note	1934	Julian	Morgenthau	Green
Federal Reserve Note	1934 Hawaii	Julian	Morgenthau	Green
Federal Reserve Note	1934A	Julian	Morgenthau	Green
Federal Reserve Note	1934A Hawaii	Julian	Morgenthau	Green
Federal Reserve Note	1934B	Julian	Vinson	Green
Federal Reserve Note	1934C	Julian	Snyder	Green
Federal Reserve Note	1934D	Clark	Snyder	Green
Federal Reserve Note	1950	Clark	Snyder	Green
Federal Reserve Note	1950A	Priest	Humphrey	Green
Federal Reserve Note	1950B	Priest	Anderson	Green
Federal Reserve Note	1950C	Smith	Dillon	Green
Federal Reserve Note	1950D	Granahan	Dillon	Green
Federal Reserve Note	1950E	Granahan	Fowler	Green
Federal Reserve Note	1963	Granahan	Dillon	Green
Federal Reserve Note	1963A	Granahan	Fowler	Green
Federal Reserve Note	1969	Elston	Kennedy	Green
Federal Reserve Note	1969A	Kabis	Connally	Green
Federal Reserve Note	1969B	Bañuelos	Connally	Green
Federal Reserve Note	1969C	Bañuelos	Shultz	Green
Federal Reserve Note	1974	Neff	Simon	Green
Federal Reserve Note	1977	Morton	Blumenthal	Green
Federal Reserve Note	1977A	Morton	Miller	Green
Federal Reserve Note	1981	Buchanan	Regan	Green
Federal Reserve Note	1981A	Ortega	Regan	Green
Federal Reserve Note	1985	Ortega	Baker	Green
Federal Reserve Note	1988A	Villalpando	Brady	Green
Federal Reserve Note	1990	Villalpando	Brady	Green
Federal Reserve Note	1993	Withrow	Bentsen	Green
Federal Reserve Note	1995	Withrow	Rubin	Green
Federal Reserve Note	1999	Withrow	Summers	Green
Federal Reserve Note	2001	Marin	O'Neill	Green
Federal Reserve Note	2003	Marin	Snow	Green
Federal Reserve Note	2004A	Cabral	Snow	Green
Federal Reserve Note	2006	Cabral	Paulson	Green
Federal Reserve Note	2009	Rios	Geithner	Green
Federal Reserve Note	2013	Rios	Lew	Green
Federal Reserve Note	2017	Carranza	Mnuchin	Green
Federal Reserve Note	2017A	Carranza	Mnuchin	Green
Federal Reserve Note	2021	Malerba	Yellen	Green

== Proposed redesigns of the ten-dollar bill ==
In 2015, the multi-agency Advanced Counterfeit Deterrence Steering Committee (ACD) developed a schedule for the next generation of US bills, known as Catalyst, which will contain new security and anti-counterfeiting features as well as increased accessibility for the blind and visually impaired. On June 17, 2015, Treasury Secretary Jack Lew announced that a woman's portrait would be featured on a redesigned ten-dollar bill by 2020, although the ACD was not planning for it to be production ready until 2026. The Department of Treasury was seeking the public's input on who should appear on the new bill during the design phase.

Removal of Hamilton was controversial. Many believed that Hamilton, as the first Secretary of the Treasury, should remain on U.S. Currency in some form, all the while thinking that U.S. Currency was long overdue to feature a female historical figure – names that had been raised included Eleanor Roosevelt, Harriet Tubman, and Susan B. Anthony. This led to the Treasury Department stating that Hamilton would remain on the bill in some way. The $10 bill was chosen because it was scheduled for a regular security redesign, a years-long process. The redesigned ten-dollar bill was to be the first U.S. note to incorporate tactile features to assist those with visual disabilities.

On April 20, 2016, it was announced that Alexander Hamilton would remain the primary face on the $10 bill, due in part to the sudden popularity of the first Treasury Secretary after the success of the 2015 Broadway musical Hamilton. It was simultaneously announced that Harriet Tubman's likeness would appear on the $20 bill while Andrew Jackson would now appear on the reverse with the White House. The 2016 design for the reverse of the new $10 bill was set to feature the heroines of the Women's Suffrage Movement in the United States, including Susan B. Anthony, Alice Paul, Sojourner Truth, Elizabeth Cady Stanton, Lucretia Mott, and the participants of the 1913 Woman Suffrage Procession who marched in Washington, D.C., in favor of full voting rights for American women.

In August 2017, the Bureau of Engraving and Printing (BEP) began development of the Catalyst $10 and $50 bills. As of October 2022, the plan was to release a new $10 bill in 2026, $50 bill in 2028, $20 bill in 2030 followed later by a new $5 then $100 notes later in the 2030s. The new bills will include "raised tactile features" for the blind and visually impaired which will be applied as part of the intaglio printing process. Due to the development of the bill's security features, the designs of the new bills will likely be released 6 months before each bill is issued.

== See also ==
- Ten Dollar Bill (Lichtenstein)

== Sources ==
- Friedberg, Arthur; Ira Friedberg; David Bowers (2005). A Guide Book of United States Paper Money: Complete Source for History, Grading, and Prices (Official Red Book). Whitman Publishing. ISBN 0-7948-1786-6.
- Hudgeons, Thomas (2005). The Official Blackbook Price Guide to U.S. Paper Money 2006 (38th ed.). House of Collectibles. ISBN 1-4000-4845-1.
- Wilhite, Robert (1998). Standard Catalog of United States Paper Money (17th ed.). Krause Pubns Inc. ISBN 0-87341-653-8.
