= 1956 in art =

Events from the year 1956 in art.

== Events ==
- March 1 – Replica statue of the Discus Thrower dedicated in Washington, D.C., as a gift from the Italian government to commemorate the return of looted art objects after World War II.
- March – 56 Group founded, to promote modernist art in Wales. Subsequently renamed 56 Group Wales.
- August 9 – Art exhibition This Is Tomorrow opens at Whitechapel Art Gallery in London.
- September 17 – Release in the United States of the biographical film Lust for Life with Kirk Douglas portraying Vincent van Gogh and Anthony Quinn as Paul Gauguin.
- Le mystère Picasso, a French documentary film, shows Pablo Picasso in the act of creating paintings for the camera (which he subsequently destroys so that they will exist only on film).
- William Klein publishes his photo essay New York, 1954–55.
- Shanghai Art Museum, the predecessor of the China Art Museum, opens.
- English curator Jim Ede settles at Kettle's Yard, Cambridge, England.
- English painter Edward Seago joins a tour of the Antarctic.
- Two attacks are made on Leonardo da Vinci's Mona Lisa in the Louvre, Paris.

== Awards ==
- Archibald Prize: William Dargie – Mr Albert Namatjira
- Kate Greenaway Medal – Edward Ardizzone for Tim All Alone

== Films ==
- Lust for Life

== Works ==
- Laurence Bradshaw – Monument to Karl Marx at Highgate Cemetery, London (including bronze bust)
- Alexander Calder – Red Mobile
- Frank Cadogan Cowper – The Golden Bowl
- Salvador Dalí – Living Still Life
- M. C. Escher – Print Gallery (lithograph)
- Max Ernst – L'oiseau Rose
- Helen Frankenthaler – Eden
- Richard Hamilton – Just What Is It that Makes Today's Homes So Different, So Appealing? (collage)
- Rudolf Hausner – The Ark of Odysseus
- Hans Hoffman - Fortissimo
- Eduardo Kingman – La Lavendera
- Roy Lichtenstein – Ten Dollar Bill (lithograph)
- O. Winston Link - Hotshot Eastbound (black-and-white photograph)
- L. S. Lowry – The Floating Bridge
- Joan Mitchell
  - Café
  - Hemlock
- Candido Portinari – Self-portrait
- Norman Rockwell – The Scoutmaster
- Kay Sage – Le Passage
- Alexander Nikolayevich Samokhvalov – Cafe Gurzuf
- Charles Sheeler – On a Shaker Theme
- David Wynne – Sir Thomas Beecham (bronzes)

== Exhibitions ==
- August 9–September 9 – This Is Tomorrow, Whitechapel Art Gallery, London, featuring principally the interdisciplinary ICA Independent Group, including early examples of Pop Art.

== Births ==
- January 1 – Mirko Ilić, Bosnian-born American illustrator, art director and graphic designer
- January 2 – Lynda Barry, American cartoonist
- January 19 – Junpei Satoh, Japanese Western-style painter
- February 24 – Fiona Graham-Mackay, née Bain, British portrait painter
- May 25 – Andrea Pazienza, Italian comics artist (d. 1988)
- undated
  - Lee Bae, South Korean visual artist
  - Emma Biggs, English mosaicist
  - Cornelia Parker, English sculptor and installation artist
  - Veronica Ryan, Montserrat-born British sculptor
  - Mackenzie Thorpe, English painter and sculptor

== Deaths ==
- January 13 – Lyonel Feininger, German American painter and cartoonist (b. 1871)
- April 23 – Cecile Walton, Scottish painter, illustrator and sculptor (b. 1891)
- May 3 – Peter Watson, English arts benefactor (murdered) (b. 1908)
- June 8 – Marie Laurencin, French painter and engraver (b. 1883)
- June 11 - Frank Brangwyn, Welsh painter (b. 1867)
- July 26 – Louis Raemaekers, Dutch painter and cartoonist (b. 1869)
- August 7 – LeMoine FitzGerald, Canadian painter (b. 1890)
- August 11 – Jackson Pollock, American painter (b. 1912)
- August 16 – Theodor Pallady, Romanian painter (b. 1871)
- November 3 – Jean Metzinger, French painter (b. 1883)
- December 16 – Nina Hamnett, British painter, model and designer (b. 1890)
- Mohamed Nagy, Egyptian painter (b. 1888)

== See also ==
- 1956 in Fine Arts of the Soviet Union
