= Ten Dollar Bill (Lichtenstein) =

Lithographic drawing by Roy Lichtenstein

- Artist: Roy Lichtenstein
- Year: 1956
- Type: Proto-pop art
- Dimensions: 14 cm × 28.6 cm (5.5 in × 11.3 in)
- Location: 25 editions

Ten Dollar Bill (also referred to as The Dollar Bill) is a 1956 proto-pop art lithographic drawing by Roy Lichtenstein. Considered to be a combination of Americana art and cubism, the work is referred to as the beginning of Lichtenstein's work on pop art. Twenty-five editions of the lithograph were made by Lichtenstein, which were exhibited at several galleries. The piece is based on the design for the ten-dollar bill and has influenced several of Lichtenstein's later works. The picture has received generally favorable reception from critics, and is considered to be one of the best artistic portrayals of currency.

== Background and history ==
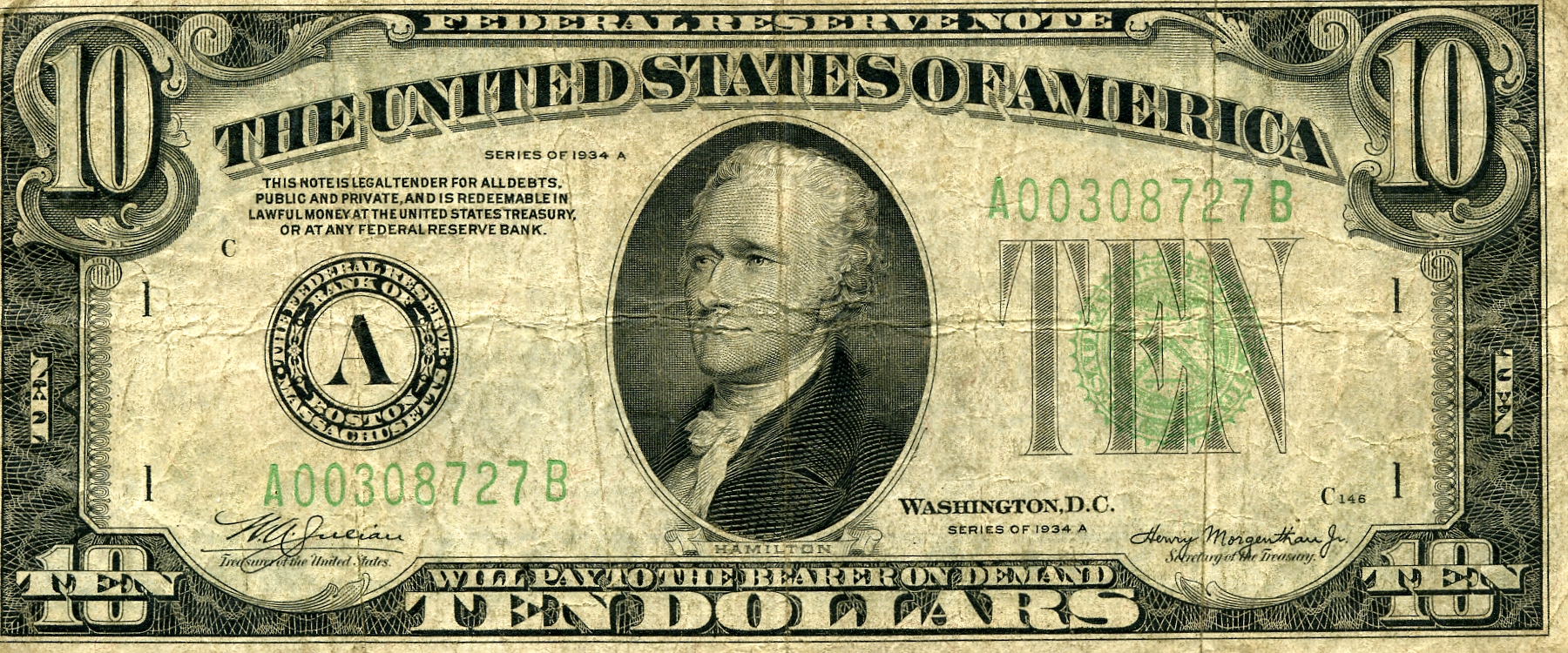
The U.S. ten-dollar bill is the source for Ten Dollar Bill

Roy Lichtenstein began experimentation with printmaking in the late 1940s, well before its rise in popularity in the early 1960s. Lichtenstein created his first lithograph and woodcut artwork in 1948 while he was working on receiving his graduate degree in fine arts from Ohio State University. During the late 1940s, he created abstract paintings influenced by several artists, especially Pablo Picasso. From 1951 through early 1956, Lichtenstein painted what were considered by Gianni Mercurio to be "jagged, post-cubist" designs of famous American artworks. Many of his pieces reflected portraits of the American west, especially Native Americans and cowboys, as well as other themes, such as images of president George Washington. Lichtenstein referred to the period as his "American" series, and it was generally negatively received by critics. Lichtenstein also began experimenting in abstract expressionism, using the technique on several of his western painting designs. These were poorly received, however, being compared by one critic to "the doodling of a five-year old".

In 1956, Lichtenstein created twenty-five editions of Ten Dollar Bill and gave them to several private collectors and museums. Starting in late October 1994, Ten Dollar Bill went on display at the National Gallery of Art in Washington, D.C., along with 89 of Lichtenstein's print artworks. As a part of "The Prints of Roy Lichtenstein", the piece was displayed in Washington until January 8, 1995, before it was moved to the Los Angeles County Museum of Art and put on display as part of that city's WinterFest '95, starting in mid-February of that year. The tour moved in May to the Dallas Museum of Art, the final place it was displayed. In December 1996, Lichtenstein and his wife donated 154 prints of his artwork to the National Gallery of Art for permanent keeping. This donation included several famous pieces, including Crying Girl, along with one of the editions of Ten Dollar Bill.

Another edition of Ten Dollar Bill was a part of the showcase opening exhibit "$how Me the Money: The Dollar As Art" for the American Numismatic Association Money Museum in Colorado Springs, Colorado. This exhibit ran from October 4, 2002, until December 1. The lithograph was shown alongside work from Andy Warhol, Robert Dowd, and others. Later, the work was made a part of the "Roy Lichtenstein Prints 1956-1997" collection, created entirely from the family gallery of Jordan Schnitzer. This tour began in June 2006 at the Jordan Schnitzer Museum of Art, and traveled across the country, exhibiting in Las Vegas and Austin, Texas, among other places. The collection tour ended in 2008.

== Description ==
Based on the design for the United States ten-dollar bill, Ten Dollar Bill measures 14 by 28.6 centimetres (5.5 by 11.3 in), and is drawn on sheets of paper with dimensions of 42.8 by 57.6 centimetres (16.9 by 22.7 in). Classified as a proto-pop art work, the lithograph is considered by Janis Hendrickson to be "a Picasso-esque vision of what currency could look like", as well as a "humorous" combination of "established art forms and Americana". The drawing has the dimensions and shape of the ten-dollar bill, and completely covers the space needed, which has led to Lichtenstein being considered by Hendrickson as "almost seeming to be forging money". Hendrickson also describes the picture as being a "brand-new bill of tender and not a picture of one". Mary Lee Corlett and Hendrickson noted that the "schematic head" of the medallion portrait of Alexander Hamilton, the prominent feature of the print, "shows him as a planar, anteater-like being" with a "hair-do of the young Picasso" and eyes similar to a "figure by Francis Picabia". According to Hendrickson, the exterior framing for The Dollar Bill was "simplified" from the original dollar design, appearing in "an imbalanced, drunken fashion". The lithograph has full margins surrounding the main design, as well as the signature "rf Lichtenstein" and a number between one and 25, followed by /25, reflecting the print number of the specific work, as well as the years 1956/79.

== Reception ==
Stephen Goode, a critic for Insight on the News, considered the piece to be the beginning of the Pop Art movement, labeling the work "a sign of things to come as other artists tackled common yet sacrosanct items, including the American flag". Lichtenstein, reflecting on his work, told reporters, "The idea of counterfeiting money always occurs to you when you do lithography". Despite the assessments of critics, Lichtenstein, in an interview with Joan Marter, considered the work to be "a kind of Cubist dollar bill, not a Pop one". He continued, "The fact it was a ten-dollar-bill at all [suggests that] there was some kind of Pop influence on me that I wasn't aware of so much. They're really not Pop at all. They're more funny, or humorous, or something".

In the book Off Limits: Rutgers University and the Avant-garde, 1957-1963, the piece was described as a "humorous, Cubist abstraction of the currency". Discussing the piece after edition 10 was given to the National Gallery of Australia, critic Jaklyn Babington considered Lichtenstein's early works, including Ten Dollar Bill, to be "intriguing precursors to the artist’s subsequent development". She called it a "finely hand-drawn lithograph", and considered the work to be "the only hint of Lichtenstein’s imminent obsession with American popular culture". Babington finished by noting, "we see Lichtenstein first taking an everyday object, symbolic of the growing American consumer culture, as his subject matter".

== See also ==
- 1956 in art
