= CITN =

CITN may refer to:

- Chartered Institute of Taxation of Nigeria, a professional organization of tax practitioners
- Compound interest treasury note, a piece of legal tender in the United States that accumulated interest
