= Bibliography of encyclopedias: art and artists =

This is a list of encyclopedias and encyclopedic/biographical dictionaries published on the subject of art and artists in any language. Entries are in the English language unless stated as otherwise.

== General art ==
- American Federation of Arts. Who's who in American art. Marquis Who's Who [etc.], 1936/1937–. ISSN 0000-0191.
- Artcyclopedia: The fine art search engine. Artcyclopedia, 1999–.http://artcyclopedia.com.
- Ashwin, Clive. Encyclopedia of Drawing: Materials, Techniques and Style. North Light, 1983.
- Atkins, Robert. Artspeak: A guide to contemporary ideas, movements, and buzzwords, 1945 to the present. Abbeville Press, 1997. ISBN 0789203650.
- Bahn, Paul G. The new Penguin dictionary of archaeology. Penguin, 2004. ISBN 0140514473.
- Ballast, David Kent. The encyclopedia of associations and information sources for architects, designers, and engineers. Sharpe Professional, 1998. ISBN 0765600358.
- Bénézit, E. Dictionary of artists Gründ, 2006. ISBN 2700030702.
- Berman, Esmé. Art and artists of South Africa: An illustrated biographical dictionary and historical survey of painters, sculptors and graphic artists since 1875. Southern Books, 1996. ISBN 1868123456.
- Boardman, John. Lexicon iconographicum mythologiae classicae (LIMC). Artemis, c1981–c1997. ISBN 3760887511.
- Brigstocke, Hugh. The Oxford companion to western art. Oxford University Press, 2001. ISBN 0198662033.
- The Britannica Encyclopedia of American Art. Encyclopædia Britannica Educational Corp., 1973.
- Cahill, James, Osvald Sirén, Ellen Johnston Laing. An index of early Chinese painters and paintings: T'ang, Sung, and Yüan. University of California Press, 1980. ISBN 0520035763.
- Cancik, Hubert, Helmuth Schneider, Christine F. Salazar, David E. Orton. Brill's New Pauly: Encyclopaedia of the ancient world. Brill, 2002–. ISBN 9004122591.
- Chilvers, Ian (30 July 2004). Diccionario del arte del siglo XX (in Spanish). Editorial Complutense. ISBN 978-84-7491-600-3.
- Chilvers, Ian. Concise Oxford Dictionary of Art and Artists. Oxford, 1990.
- Chilvers, Ian. The Oxford dictionary of art. Oxford University Press, 2004. ISBN 0198604769.
- Chilvers, Ian and Harold Osborne. Oxford Dictionary of Art. Oxford, 1988.
- Daniel, Howard. Encyclopedia of Themes and Subjects in Painting. Abrams, 1971.
- Davenport, R. J., Gordon's Art Reference, Inc. Davenport's art reference and price guide. Gordon's Art Reference, Inc., 1984–. ISSN 1540-1553.
- Dawdy, Doris Ostrander. Artists of the American West: A biographical dictionary. Sage Books, [1974]–c1985. ISBN 0804006075.
- DeMello, Margo. Encyclopedia of body adornment. Greenwood Press, 2007. ISBN 9780313336959.
- Dunford, Penny. A biographical dictionary of women artists in Europe and America since 1850. University of Pennsylvania Press, 1989. ISBN 0812282302.
- Earls, Irene. Baroque art: A topical dictionary. Greenwood Press, 1996. ISBN 0313294062.
- Earls, Irene. Renaissance art: A topical dictionary. Greenwood Press, 1987. ISBN 0313246580.
- Elmes, James (1824). A General and Bibliographical Dictionary of the Fine Arts.
- Enciclopedia dell'arte antica, classica e orientale. Istituto della Enciclopedia italiana, [1958–1985].
- Encyclopaedia Londinensis, or, Universal dictionary of arts, sciences, and literature. 1810.
- Encyclopedia of World Art. Publishers Guild, 1983.
- Rodney K. Engen (1985). Dictionary of Victorian wood engravers. Teaneck, N.J. ISBN 978-0-85964-139-5.
- Falk, Peter H., Audrey M. Lewis, Georgia Kuchen. Who was who in American art, 1564–1975: 400 years of artists in America. Sound View Press, 1999. ISBN 0932087558.
- Farris, Phoebe. Women artists of color: A bio-critical sourcebook to 20th century artists in the Americas. Greenwood Press, 1999. ISBN 0313303746.
- Fielding, Mantle, Glenn B. Opitz. Mantle Fielding's dictionary of American painters, sculptors and engravers. Apollo, 1986. ISBN 0938290045.
- Galería de Arte Nacional (Venezuela). Diccionario biográfico de las artes visuales en Venezuela. Fundación Galería de Arte Nacional, 2005. ISBN 9806420187.
- Gascoigne, Bamber. How to identify prints: A complete guide to manual and mechanical processes from woodcut to inkjet. Thames & Hudson, 2004. ISBN 0500284806.
- Gaze, Delia, Maja Mihajlovic, Leanda Shrimpton. Dictionary of women artists. Fitzroy Dearborn, 1997. ISBN 1884964214.
- Getty Research Institute. Union list of artist names online. Getty Research Institute. Available online here.
- Giorgi, Rosa, Stefano Zuffi. Saints in art. J. Paul Getty Museum, 2003. ISBN 0892367172.
- Goldman, Paul. Looking at prints, drawings, and watercolours: A guide to technical terms. British Museum Press, 2006. ISBN 9780892368716.
- Goldwater, Robert John, Marco Treves. Artists on art: From the 14th to the 20th century. J. Murray, 1976. ISBN 0719533120.
- Goulart, Ron. The Encyclopedia of American Comics. Facts on File, 1990.
- Gould, John (1838). Biographical dictionary of painters, sculptors, engravers, and architects, from the earliest ages to the present time: interspersed with original anecdotes. Greenland.
- Gowing, Lawrence. The Encyclopedia of Visual Art. Encyclopædia Britannica Educational Corp., 1989.
- Hall, James. Dictionary of Subjects and Symbols in Art. Harper & Row, 2nd ed., 1979.
- Hallmark, Kara Kelley. Encyclopedia of Asian American artists. Greenwood Press, 2007. ISBN 9780313334511.
- Harris, Jonathan. Art history: The key concepts. Routledge, 2006. ISBN 0415319765.
- Hartmann, Sys (2000). Weilbach – Dansk Kunstnerleksikon (in Danish). Munksgaard. ISBN 978-87-16-11206-4.. A freely accessible online version is available.
- Heller, Jules and Nancy Heller. North American women artists of the twentieth century: A biographical dictionary. Garland, 1995. ISBN 0824060490.
- Heller, Nancy G. Women artists: An illustrated history. Abbeville Press, 2003. ISBN 0789207680.
- Hillstrom, Laurie Collier, Kevin Hillstrom, Lucy R. Lippard. Contemporary women artists. St. James Press, 1999. ISBN 1558623728.
- Horn, Maurice. Contemporary graphic artists: A biographical, bibliographical, and critical guide to current illustrators, animators, cartoonists, designers, and other graphic artists. Gale Research, 1986–. ISBN 0810321890.
- Horn, Maurice. World Encyclopedia of Cartoons. Chelsea House, 1980.
- Horn, Maurice. World Encyclopedia of Comics. Chelsea House, 1976.
- Hornblower, Simon, Antony Spawforth. The Oxford classical dictionary. Oxford University Press, 2003. ISBN 0198606419.
- Houfe, Simon. The dictionary of 19th century British book illustrators and caricaturists. Antique Collectors' Club, 1996. ISBN 1851491937.
- Lang, Harry G.; Meath-Lang, Bonnie (1995). Deaf Persons in the Arts and Sciences: A Biographical Dictionary. Greenwood Publishing Group. ISBN 978-0-313-29170-8.
- Joan Marter (20 January 2011). The Grove Encyclopedia of American Art. Oxford University Press. ISBN 978-0-19-533579-8.
- Kazhdan, Alexander B. The Oxford Dictionary of Byzantium. Oxford University Press, 1991. ISBN 014051323X.
- Kelly, Michael. Encyclopedia of aesthetics. Oxford University Press, 1998. ISBN 0195113071.
- Kort, Carol, Liz Sonneborn. A to Z of American women in the visual arts. Facts on File, 2002. ISBN 0816043973.
- Marquis Who's Who. Who's who in American art. Marquis Who's Who, 1936/37-.
- McCulloch, Alan; McCulloch, Susan (1994). The Encyclopedia of Australian Art. University of Hawaii Press. ISBN 978-0-8248-1688-9.
- McCulloch, Alan; McCulloch, Susan; Childs, Emily McCulloch (2006). McCulloch's Encyclopedia of Australian Art. McCulloch & McCulloch. ISBN 978-0-522-85317-9.
- McGraw-Hill Dictionary of Art. McGraw-Hill, 1969.
- Meissner, Günter, K. G. Saur. Allgemeines Künstlerlexikon: Die bildenden Künstler aller Zeiten und Völker. K. G. Saur, 1992–. ISBN 359822740X. (German)
- Meyer, George H., George H. Meyer, Jr., Katherine P. White, Museum of American Folk Art. Folk artists biographical index. Gale Research, 1987. ISBN 0810321459.
- Milner, John, Antique Collector's Club. A dictionary of Russian and Soviet artists, 1420–1970. Antique Collectors' Club, 1993. ISBN 1851491821.
- Müller, Hermann Alexander and Hans W. Singer (1895–1901). Allgemeines Künstler-Lexicon (in German). Frankfurt am Main: Rütten & Loening.
- Müller, Hermann Alexander and Hans W. Singer (1906). Nachträge und Berichtigungen (in German). Frankfurt am Main: Rütten & Loening.
- Munro, Eleanor C. (1961). The Golden Encyclopedia of Art: Painting, Sculpture, Architecture, and Ornament, from Prehistoric Times to the Twentieth Century. Golden Press.
- Murray, Peter and Linda Murray. Dictionary of Art and Artists. Penguin, 1972.
- Museum of Fine Arts, Boston. Conservation and art materials encyclopedia online: CAMEO. Museum of Fine Arts, Boston. .
- Naylor, Colin, Leana Shrimpton. Contemporary masterworks. St. James Press, 1991. ISBN 1558620834.
- Nelson, Robert S., Richard Shiff. Critical terms for art history. University of Chicago Press, 2003. ISBN 0226571661.
- Newland, Amy Reigle. The Hotei encyclopedia of Japanese woodblock prints. Hotei Publishing, 2005. ISBN 9074822657.
- Ormond, Richard, Malcolm Rogers, Adriana Davies. Dictionary of British portraiture. Oxford University Press, 1979–1981. ISBN 0195201809.
- Osborne, Harold. Oxford Companion to Art. Oxford, 1970.
- Osborne, Harold. Oxford Companion to the Decorative Arts. Oxford, 1975.
- Osborne, Harold. Oxford Companion to Twentieth Century Art. Oxford, 1982.
- Oxford art online. Oxford University Press, 2008–. .
- Palmer, Frederick. Encyclopedia of Oil Painting: Materials and Techniques. North Light, 1984.
- Pendergast, Sara, Tom Pendergast. Contemporary artists. St. James Press, 2002. ISBN 1558624880.
- Petteys, Chris. Dictionary of women artists: An international dictionary of women artists born before 1900. G.K. Hall, 1985. ISBN 0816184569.
- Piper, David. Random House Dictionary of Art and Artists. Random House, 1990.
- Praeger Dictionary of Art. Praeger, 1971.
- Quick, John (1977). Artists' and Illustrators' Encyclopedia. McGraw-Hill.
- Reid, Jane Davidson and Chris Rohman. The Oxford guide to classical mythology in the arts, 1300–1990s. Oxford University Press, 1993. ISBN 0195049985.
- Riggs, Thomas, Schomburg Center for Research in Black Culture. St. James guide to black artists. St. James Press, 1997. ISBN 1558622209.
- Riggs, Thomas, Association of Hispanic Arts (New York). St. James guide to Hispanic artists: Profiles of Latino and Latin American artists. St. James Press, 2002. ISBN 1558624708.
- Sill, Gertrude Grace. Handbook of Symbols in Christian Art. Macmillan, 1975.
- Smithsonian Institution. Galaxy of knowledge: Smithsonian Institution Libraries. Smithsonian Institution, 2002. .
- Smithsonian Institution. Smithsonian Institution research information system: SIRIS. Smithsonian Institution, 207-. .
- Stanos, Nikos. Concepts of modern art: From fauvism to postmodernism. Thames and Hudson, 1994. ISBN 0500202680.
- Stevenson, George A. Graphic Arts Encyclopedia. Design Press, 1992.
- Strutt, Joseph (1786). A biographical dictionary: containing an historical account of all the engravers, from the earliest period of the art of engraving to the present time; and a short list of their most esteemed works. ... With several curious specimens of the performances of the most ancient artists. By Joseph Strutt. ... printed by J. Davis, for Robert Faulder.
- Summers, Claude J. The queer encyclopedia of the visual arts. Cleis Press, 2004. ISBN 1573441910.
- Thames and Hudson Dictionary of Art and Artists. Thames and Hudson, 1985.
- Thieme, Ulrich and Felix Becker (1907–1950). Allgemeines Lexicon der bildenden Künstler von derk Antike bis zur Gegenwart (in German). Leipzig: Seeman.
- Turner, Jane (1996). The Dictionary of Art. Grove's Dictionaries. ISBN 978-1-884446-00-9.
- Vollmer, Hans. Allgemeines Lexikon der bildenden Künstler des XX. Jahrhunderts. Seemann, [1979?].
- Walker, John Albert, Clive Phillpot. Glossary of art, architecture and design since 1945. G.K. Hall, 1992. ISBN 0816105561.
- Wertkin, Gerard C., Lee Kogan American Folk Art Museum. Encyclopedia of American folk art. Routledge, 2004. ISBN 0415929865.
- World Monuments Fund. World monuments watch: 100 most endangered sites. 2007–. .

=== Architecture ===
- Architectural Publication Society (1892). Dictionary of architecture. London: Richards.
- Calloway, Stephen. Elements of Style: A Practical Encyclopedia of Interior Architectural Details from 1485 to the Present. Simon & Schuster, 1991.
- Packard, Robert T. and Balthazar Korab. Encyclopedia of American Architecture. McGraw-Hill, 1994.
- Planat, Paul Amédée (1888–1892). Encyclopédie de l'architecture et de la construction (in French). Paris: Dujardin.
- Sturgis, Russell (1901–1902). Dictionary of architecture and building. New York: Macmillan.
- Viollet-Le-Duc, Eugéne Emmanuel (1854–1868). Dictionnaire raisonné de l'architecture française du XIc au XVIc siècle (in French). Paris: Bance.

=== Decorative arts and antiques ===
- Cameron, Ian and Elizabeth Kingsley-Rowe. Random House Encyclopedia of Antiques. Random House, 1973.
- Engen, Rodney K. Dictionary of Victorian wood engravers. Chadwyck-Healey, 1985. ISBN 0859641392.
- Garner, Philippe. Encyclopedia of Decorative Arts, 1890–1940. Van Nostrand, 1979.
- Mackay, James. Encyclopedia of Small Antiques. Harper & Row, 1975.
- Phillips, Phoebe. The Collectors' Encyclopedia of Antiques. Crown, 1973; Smith, 1989.
- Phipps, Frances. Collector's Complete Dictionary of American Antiques. Doubleday, 1974.
- Ramsey, L. G. G. Complete Color Encyclopedia of Antiques. 2nd ed., Hawthorn, 1975.
- Random House Collector's Encyclopedia: Victoriana to Art Deco. Random House, 1974.
- Ross, Mabel. Encyclopedia of Handspinning. Interweave Press, 1988.
- Savage, George. Dictionary of 19th Century Antiques and Later Objets d'Art. Putnam, 1978.
- Torbet, Laura. The Encyclopedia of Crafts. Scribner's, 1980.
- Wills, Geoffrey. Concise Encyclopedia of Antiques. Van Nostrand, 1976.

==== Engraving ====
- Engen, Rodney K. Dictionary of Victorian wood engravers. Chadwyck-Healey, 1985. ISBN 0859641392.

==== Furniture ====
- Aronson, Joseph. Encyclopedia of Furniture. 3rd ed., Crown, 1965.
- Boyce, Charles. Dictionary of Furniture. Facts on File, 1985.
- Fairbanks, Jonathan and Elizabeth Bidwell Bates. American Furniture: 1620 to the Present. Marek, 1981.
- Gloag, John and Clive Edwards. A Complete Dictionary of Furniture. Rev. ed., Overlook Press, 1991.

==== Jewelry ====
- Newman, Harold. Illustrated Dictionary of Jewelry. Thames & Hudson, 1987.

==== Pottery and porcelain ====
- Boger, Louise Ade. Dictionary of World Pottery and Porcelain. Scribner's, 1970.
- Cameron, Elisabeth. Encyclopedia of Pottery & Porcelain, 1800–1960. Facts on File, 1986.
- Hamer, Frank and Janet. Potter's Dictionary of Materials and Techniques. 3rd ed., University of Pennsylvania Press, 1991.

==== Textiles ====
- Jerde, Judith (1992). The Encyclopedia of Textiles. New York: Facts on File. ISBN 978-0-8160-2105-5. LCCN 91-020756.
- Racinet, August (1988). Historical Encyclopedia of Costume. New York: Facts on File. ISBN 978-0-8160-1976-2.
- Sichel, Marion (1977–1978). Costume Reference. Plays, Inc.
- Wilcox, Turner (1968). Dictionary of Costume. Scribner's.
- Yarwood, Doreen (1988) [1978, Scribner's]. The Encyclopedia of World Costume. Outlet Book Company.

=== Design ===
- Byars, Mel (2004): The Design Encyclopedia, New York, The Museum of Modern Art, 832 pages. ISBN 978-0870700125.
- Fleming, John & Hugh Honour. The Penguin Dictionary of Decorative Arts. rev. ed., Viking, 1990.
- Jervis, Simon. Facts on File Dictionary of Design and Designers. Facts on File, 1984.
- Livingston, Alan, Isabella Livingston. The Thames and Hudson dictionary of graphic design and designers. Thames & Hudson, 2003. ISBN 0500203539.
- Morteo, Enrico (2008): Grande Atlante del Design dal 1850 a oggi, Electa – Mondadori, 422 pages. ISBN 978-8837048976. (in Italian)
- Osborne, Harold. The Oxford Companion to the Decorative Arts. Oxford, 1975.
- Pendergast, Sara. Contemporary designers. St. James Press, 1997. ISBN 1558621849.
- Pile, John. Dictionary of 20th-Century Design. Facts on File, 1990.
- Riley, Noël, Bayer, Patricia (2003): The Elements of Design: a practical encyclopedia of the decorative arts from the Renaissance to the present, Free Press, 544 pages. ISBN 9780743222297.

=== Photography ===
- Auer, Michèle, Michel Auer. Encyclopédie internationale des photographes de 1839 à nos jours = Photographers encyclopaedia international 1839 to the present. (in English and French). Editions Camera obscura, 1985. ISBN 2903671044.
- Auer, Michel, Michèle, Ides et calendes. Encyclopédie internationale des photographes des débuts à nos jours = Photographers encyclopedia international from its beginnings to the present. Ides et calendes, 1997. ISBN 2825801267.
- Browne, Turner, Elaine Partnow. Macmillan biographical encyclopedia of photographic artists and innovators. Macmillan; Collier Macmillan, 1983. ISBN 0025175009.
- Carroll, John and William Broecker. Encyclopedia of Practical Photography. Amphoto, 1977–1978.
- International Center of Photography Encyclopedia of Photography. Crown, 1984.
- Evans, Martin Marix, Amanda Hopkinson, Andrei Baskakov. Contemporary photographers. St. James Press, 1995. ISBN 1558621903.
- Hannavy, John. Encyclopedia of nineteenth-century photography. Taylor & Francis Group, 2008. ISBN 0415972353.
- Mautz, Carl. Biographies of western photographers: A reference guide to photographers working in the 19th century American West. Carl Mautz, 1997. ISBN 0962194077.
- Peres, Michael R. The Focal encyclopedia of photography: Digital imaging, theory and applications, history, and science. Elsevier/Focal Press, 2007. ISBN 9780240807409.
- Stroebel, Leslie and Richard D. Zakia. The Focal Encyclopedia of Photography. Focal Press, 1993.
- Warren, Lynne. Encyclopedia of twentieth-century photography. Routledge, 2006. ISBN 1579583938.
- Willis-Thomas, Deborah. An illustrated bio-bibliography of black photographers, 1940–1988. Garland, 1989. ISBN 082408389X.

=== Sculpture ===
- Beaulieu, Michèle, Victor Beyer. Dictionnaire des sculpteurs français du moyen age. Picard, 1992. ISBN 2708404245.
- Boström, Antonia (2003): The Encyclopedia of Sculpture, 3 vols, Routledge, 1,936 pages. ISBN 978-1579582487.
- Dürre, Stefan (2007): Seemanns Lexikon der Skulptur: Bildhauer, Epochen, Themen, Techniken, Seeman, 464 pages. ISBN 9783865021014. (in German)
- Gunnis, Rupert (1953: later editions 1968 and 2009): Dictionary of British Sculptors 1660–1851
- Hachet, Jean-Charles (2005): Dictionnaire des sculpteurs et fondeurs animaliers de l'Antiquité à nos jours, Argusvalentines, 2 vols, 1,088 pages. ISBN 978-2919769131. (in French)
- Mills, John (2005): Encyclopedia of Sculpture Techniques, paperback, Batsford, 240 pages. ISBN 978-0713489309.
- Opitz, Glenn B. Dictionary of American sculptors: 18th century to the present, illustrated with over 200 photographs. Apollo, 1984. ISBN 0938290037.

=== Symbolism ===
- Drake, Maurice and Wilfred Drake (1916). Saints and their emblems. Philadelphia: Lippincott.
- Hall, James. Dictionary of Subjects and Symbols in Art. Harper & Row, 1979.
- Roberts, Helene E. Encyclopedia of comparative iconography: Themes depicted in works of art. Fitzroy Dearborn, 1998. ISBN 1579580092.
- Rochelle, Mercedes. Post-Biblical saints art index: A locator of paintings, sculptures, mosaics, icons, frescoes, manuscript illuminations, sketches, woodcuts, and engravings, created from the 4th century to 1950, with a directory of the institutions holding them. McFarland, 1994. ISBN 0899509428.
- Sill, Gertrude Grace. Handbook of Symbols in Christian Art. Macmillan, 1975.
- Speake, Jennifer. The Dent dictionary of symbols in Christian art. J. M. Dent, 1994. ISBN 0460861387.

== See also ==
- Bibliography of encyclopedias

== Bibliography ==
- Guide to Reference. American Library Association. Retrieved 5 December 2014. (subscription required).
- Kister, Kenneth F. (1994). Kister's Best Encyclopedias (2nd ed.). Phoenix: Oryx. ISBN 0-89774-744-5.
- Sheehy, Eugene P., ed. (1986). Guide to Reference Books. American Library Association. ISBN 0-8389-0390-8.
