= Fiona Graham-Mackay =

British painter (born 1956)

Fiona Graham-Mackay, nee Fiona Margaret Bain, born 24 February 1956, is a British painter. She is known for her portraits of the British royal family.

== Biography ==
Graham-Mackay attended the Royal College of Art, where she studied under Quentin Blake.

Her work has been featured by the BBC, when she painted a portrait of Andrew Motion. Graham-Mackay was chosen to paint the first official portrait of the Duchess of Cambridge. In 2012, she completed her portrait of Prince Michael of Kent. Graham-Mackay is also known for her portrait of Seamus Heaney, which was unveiled just before his death in 2013. Other portraits done by Graham-Mackay include Robin Knox-Johnston, Lord Carrington and Michael Palin.
