= Interest bearing note =

Grouping of Civil War era paper money-related emissions of the US Treasury

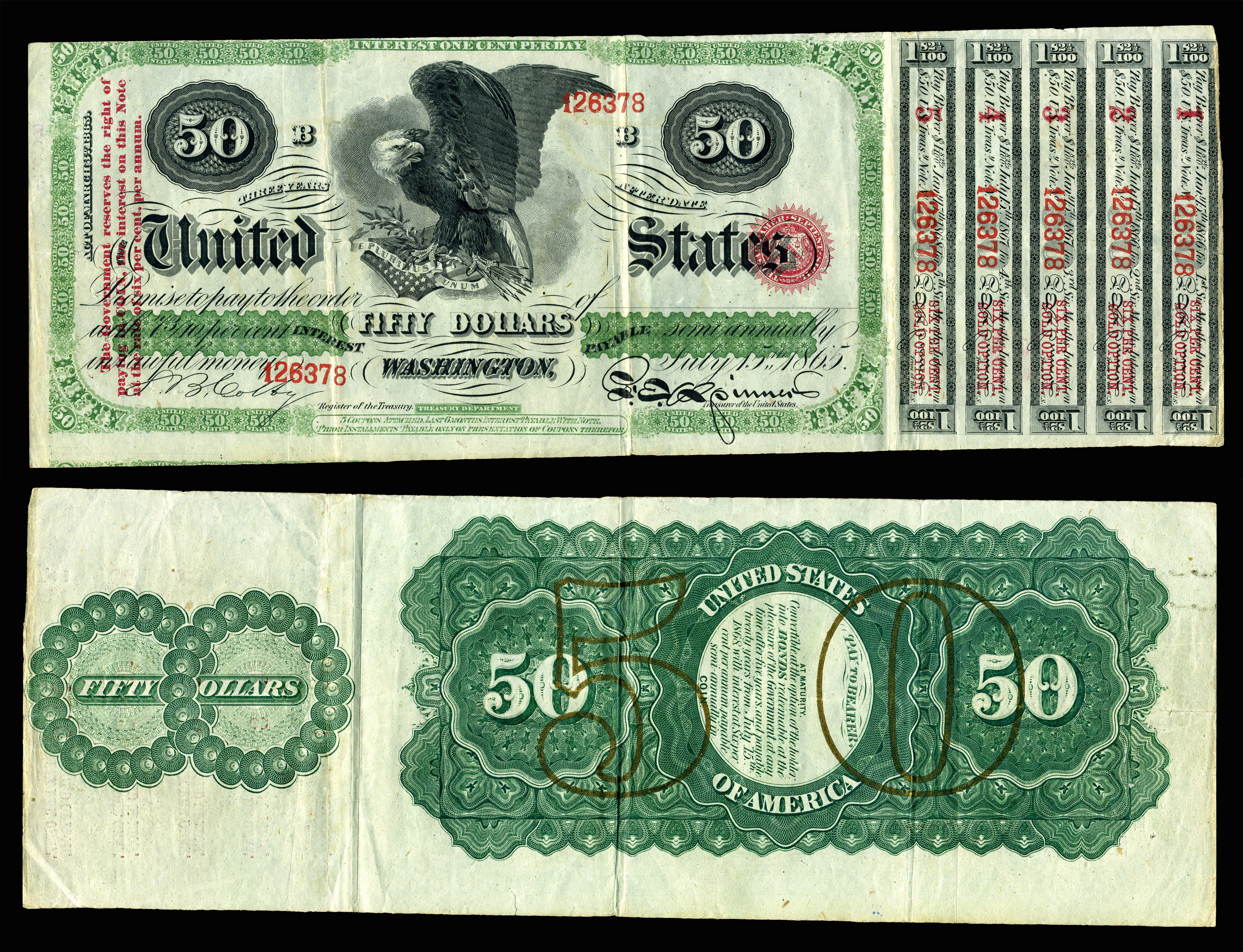
$50 three-year interest bearing note (1865), 7.3% interest paid semi-annually (with all coupons still attached).

Interest bearing notes refers to a grouping of Civil War era paper money-related emissions of the US Treasury. The grouping includes the one- and two-year notes authorized by the Act of March 3, 1863, which bore interest at five percent per annum, were a legal tender at face value, and were issued in denominations of $10, $20, $50, $100, $500 and $1000. The grouping also frequently includes the early civil war treasury notes which matured in either sixty days or two years and bore interest at six percent and the seven-thirties which matured in three years and bore interest at 7.3 percent—though both of these latter issues lacked legal tender status. Reference texts used by currency collectors will also sometimes include compound interest treasury notes and Refunding Certificates in this grouping as well.

== Denominational set of interest bearing notes ==
Images are courtesy of the National Numismatic Collection at the National Museum of American History (Smithsonian Institution).

Interest bearing notes
| Value | Terms | Year | Fr. | Image | Portrait/vignette (Note: Names in parentheses are artists who engraved the portraits or vignettes used on the notes.) | Population |
|---|---|---|---|---|---|---|
| $10 | One year (5%) | 1864 | Fr.196a | | Salmon P. Chase (Charles Burt); Eagle of the Capitol and Peace (James Bannister); | 28 known |
| $20 | One year (5%) | 1864 | Fr.197 | | (?); Mortar firing (James Smillie); Abraham Lincoln (Henry Gugler); In God is our Trust | 9 known |
| $50 | Two years (5%) | 1864 | Fr.203 | | Caduceus (Alfred Jones); Justice with Shield (Charles Burt); America (?) | 7 known |
| $100 | Two years (5%) | 1864 | Fr.204 | | Farmer and Mechanic; ((Building)); In the Turret | 2 known |
| $50 | Three years (7.3%) | 1865 | Fr.212d | | Eagle and motto | 6 known (only 2 known with coupons) |
| $100 | Three years (7.3%) | 1865 | Fr.212e | | Winfield Scott | Unknown |
| $1,000 | Three years (7.3%) | 1865 | Fr.212g counterfeit | | Justice with Shield (Charles Burt) | |
| $1,000 | One year (5%) | 1863 | Fr.201 proof | | Justice; Liberty | |
| $1,000 | Two years (5%) | 1863 | Fr.206 proof | | Guerriere and Constitution; Discovery of the Mississippi by DeSoto | |
| $5,000 | One year (5%) | 1863 | Fr.202 proof | | The Altar of Liberty (Louis Delnoce) | |
| $5,000 | Three years (7.3%) | 1865 | Fr.212h proof | | Justice; New Ironsides (James Smillie) | |
