= Junpei Satoh =

Japanese artist (born 1956)

Self-portrait, 2004

Junpei Satoh (佐藤淳平, Satō Junpei; born January 19, 1956) is a Japanese contemporary Western-style painter.

== Life ==
Junpei Satoh was born in Kesennuma, Miyagi Prefecture, Japan, and began teaching himself oil painting at the age of 10. In 1974, he moved to Tokyo and attended Musashino Art University. After graduating from the plastic department where he studied oil painting in 1979, he got employment with a construction company.

From 1984 to 1989, Junpei worked as a part time art teacher in high schools and traveled to Australia in 1986. At professional schools in Sendai, he was a design and aesthetics instructor, and nominated as a member of TOKYOTEN in 1995. In 1999, Junpei edited an art book which discussed the history of art around the world. His works are characterized by portraits, coast landscapes and waves.

== Books ==
- A Summary about the World History of Art (Sekai Bijutsushi Gairyaku), ISBN 4-7952-0259-1, 233 pages (60 in color), Hokutosha, July 1999.

== Shows ==
- 2005, 17th International Art Grand Prize Exhibition
- 1995–present, Tokyo Exhibition
- 1990, Solo Exhibition at the Miyagi Museum of Art
- 1982, Solo Exhibition at the Tokyo Chyuo Gallery of Fine Arts, Ginza, Tokyo
