= Refunding Certificate =

US Treasury banknote issued in 1879

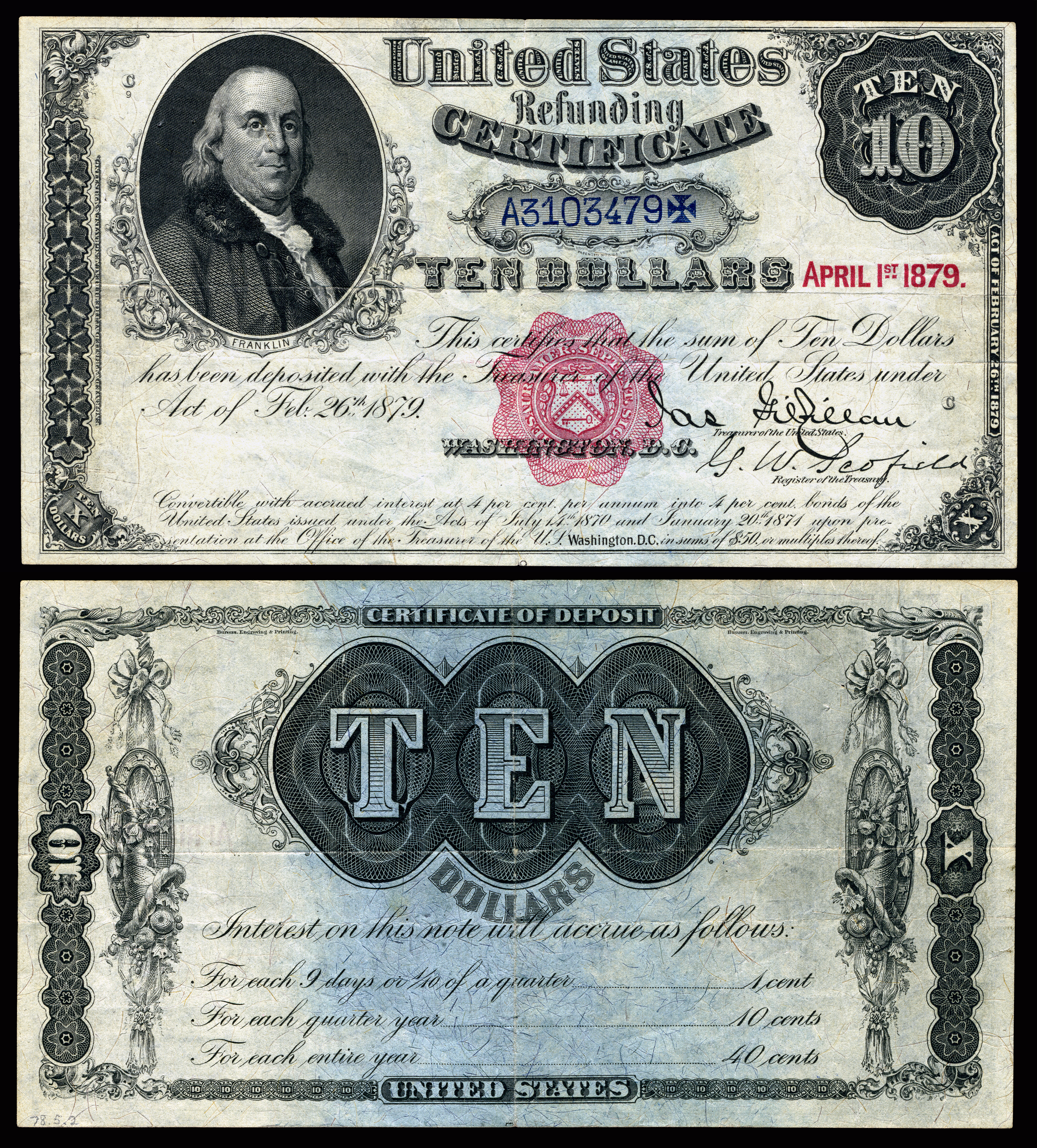
The 1879 Refunding Certificate depicting Benjamin Franklin.

The Refunding Certificate was a type of interest-bearing banknote that the United States Treasury issued in 1879. They issued it only in the $10 denomination, depicting Benjamin Franklin. Their issuance reflects the end of a coin-hoarding period that began during the American Civil War, and represented a return to public confidence in paper money.

When the Treasury issued the bonds, silver coins were in wide circulation and gold coins were just beginning to appear at banks nationwide. The Treasury paid out $40,012,750 in notes, the majority—$39,398,110 (or 98.5%)—in the fourth quarter of 1879, as long lines of people gathered at Post Office branches and Treasury offices. The Refunding Certificate originally promised to pay 4% annual interest in perpetuity. The obligation on these notes reads:

"This certifies that the sum of Ten Dollars has been deposited with the Treasurer of the United States under Act of February 26th, 1879 convertible with accrued interest at 4 per cent per annum into 4 per cent bonds of the United States issued under the Acts of July 14, 1870 and January 20, 1871 upon presentation at the office of the Treasurer of the U.S. in sums of $50. Or multiples thereof."

However, in 1907, Congress passed an act that ended the interest accrual of the certificates, and fixed the value of them at $21.30, over twice their face value. By January 1, 1885, all but $260,000 (99.4%) in face value had been redeemed.

Consistent with the Treasury Department paper used in printing the Fourth and Fifth Issues of Fractional currency (1869–76), anti-counterfeiting devices of the period included embedding large silk fibers as well as the use of blue tinted paper.

Only a few 1879 Refunding Certificates were imprinted with the inscription Payable to Order. Only two are known to still exist. Most were inscribed Payable to Bearer and even these are rare—only a few dozen are in numismatic collections.
