= Joan Marter =

American academic, art critic and author

Joan Marter is an American academic, art critic, and author. A 1968 graduate of Temple University, Marter was a Board of Governors Distinguished Professor of Art History at the time of her retirement. She is the author of many books about modern sculpture and women artists. She promoted museum scholarship throughout her career. Rutgers University. Marter is the co-editor of the Woman's Art Journal, and the editor of The Grove Encyclopedia of American Art.
