= Compound interest treasury note =

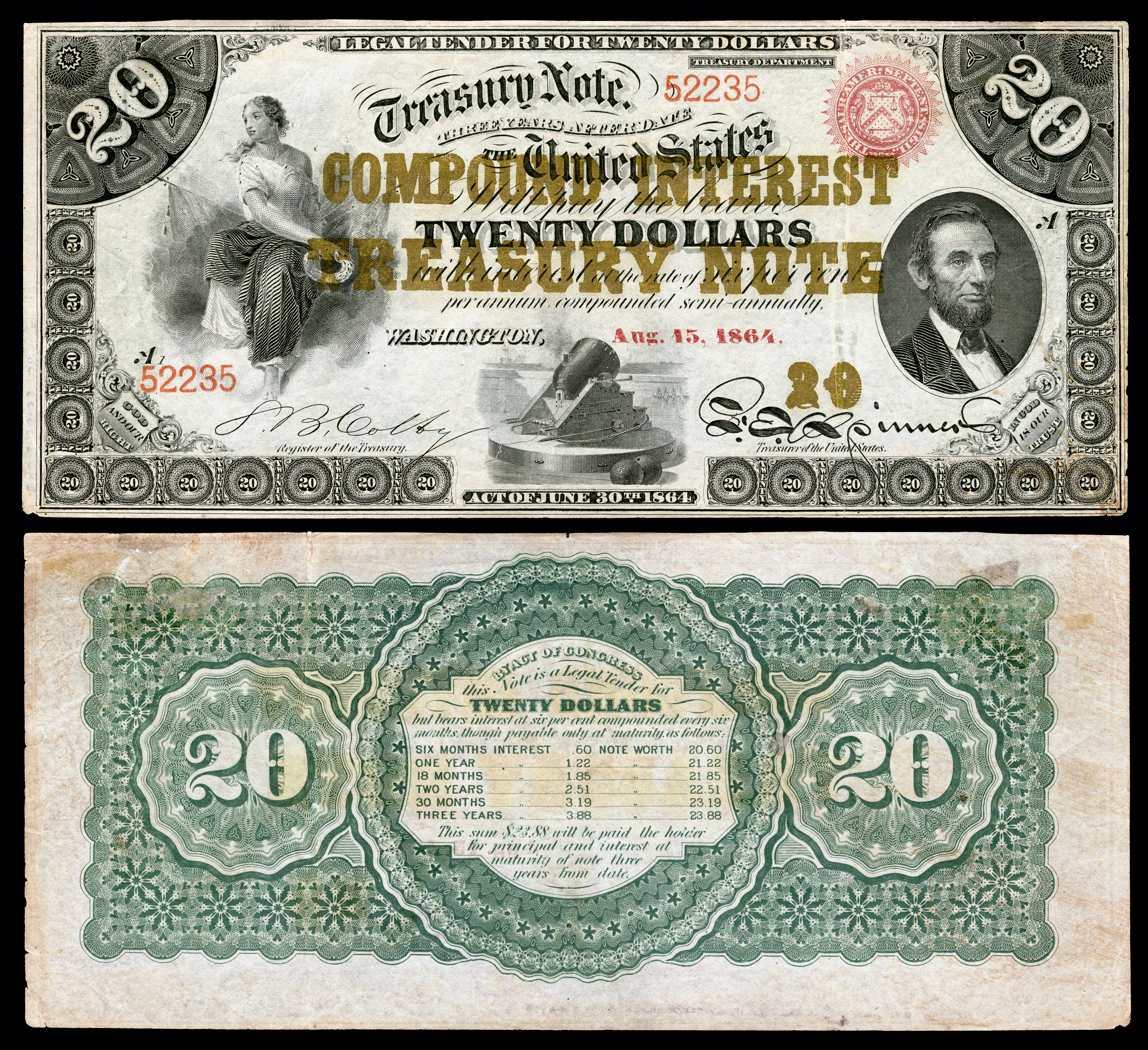
Two-year $20 1864 compound interest treasury note

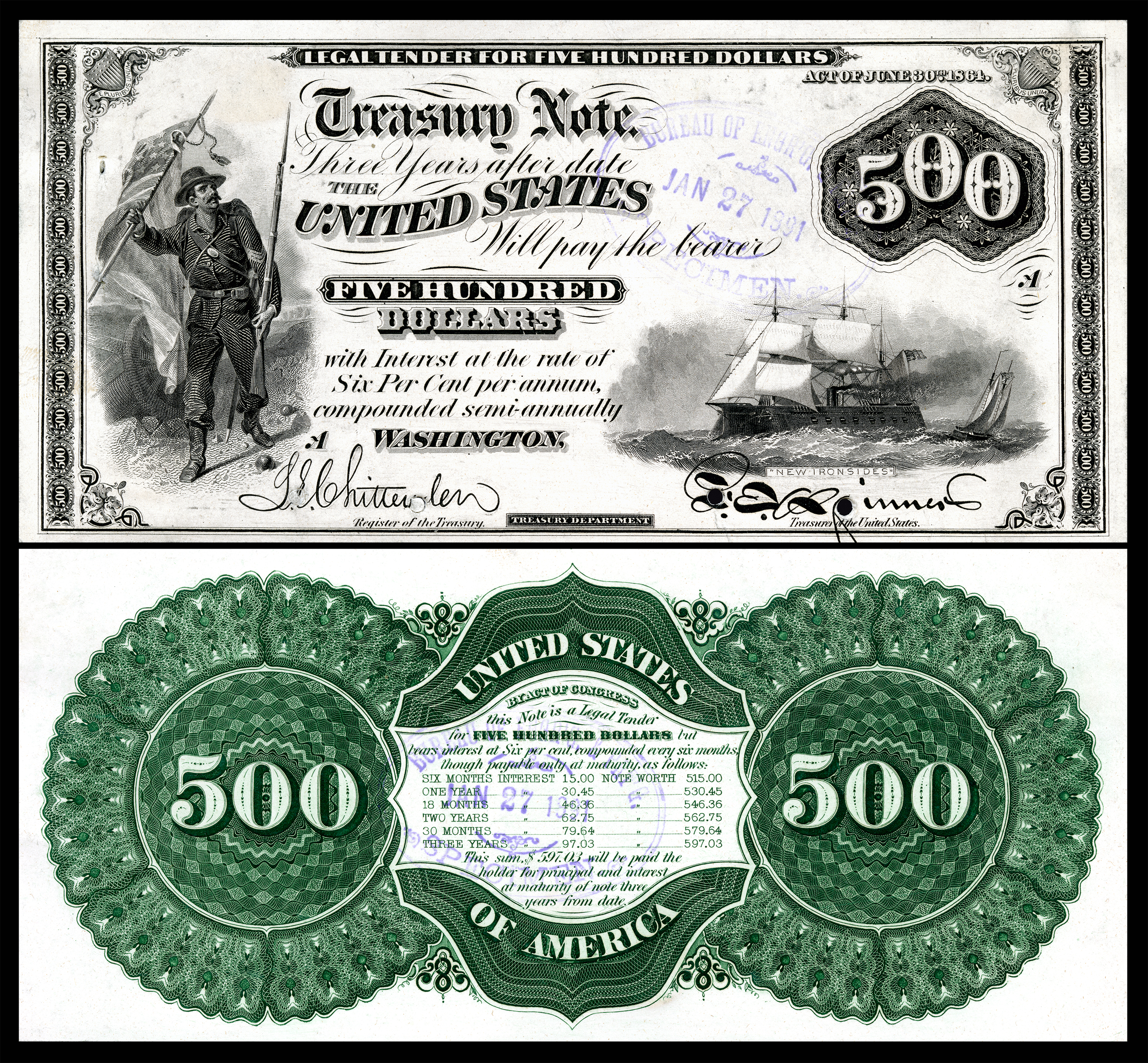
Proof of a three-year $500 1865 compound interest treasury note

Compound interest treasury notes were emissions of the United States Treasury Department authorized in 1863 and 1864 with aspects of both paper money and debt. They were issued in denominations of $10, $20, $50, $100, $500 and $1,000. While they were legal tender at face value, they were redeemable after three years with six percent annual interest compounded semi-annually. In the absence of efficient investment banks, the hybrid nature of these instruments allowed the government to directly distribute debt by paying the notes out to creditors as legal tender, and then relying on interest-seeking parties to eventually remove them from circulation in order to redeem them with interest at maturity. Thus, in theory, the notes did not contribute to monetary inflation as did the greenbacks.

At the time of their issue, investors were accustomed to receiving interest via semi-annual coupons. The compound interest notes were an innovation in that they paid interest only at maturity but compensated for the lack of immediate coupons by paying an escalated amount of interest for each six-month period. Each note presents an ornate table on the reverse containing details of the interest calculation.
