= Save the Greenback Act =

Proposed legislation in the United States

The Save the Greenback Act was legislation proposed, but not passed, in the United States Congress in 1995 and 1997 forbidding the phase-out of the United States one-dollar bill.

It stated simply, "Notwithstanding any other provision of law, the Secretary of the Treasury and the Board of Governors of the Federal Reserve System shall take such action as may be necessary to ensure that the number of Federal reserve notes in the denomination of $1 which are in circulation at any time does not decrease below the number of such reserve notes in circulation as of the date of the enactment of this Act."

In a February 24, 1995 speech introducing the Save the Greenback Act, Rep. Thomas M. Davis gave several arguments against phasing out the one-dollar bill:

- A great number of people's "pockets will be weighted down with heavy change instead of having a few bills tucked into their billfolds . . . one might suspect a conspiracy by clothing manufacturers in drafting the dollar coin proposal, as everyone's pockets begin to wear out."
- Several polls have shown that Americans prefer the one-dollar bill to a dollar coin.
- "[L]egislation designed to eliminate the dollar bill will an excuse by the special interests to raise prices on everyday items--a future sales tax, to be levied on all Americans but falling the hardest on those who can least afford it."
- The failure of the Susan B. Anthony dollar demonstrated that introduction of a dollar coin does not save the federal government money.
- "The costs of changing to a 1 dollar coin would be significant to many in the private sector including but not limited to the small town banks which would have to retool their coin counting, wrapping and sorting equipment--costs which would inevitably be passed on to their customers."

Notwithstanding these arguments, many people contend that $1 is far too low a denomination for a paper note at today's price levels and point to the example of virtually every other developed country, whose lowest-denomination banknotes are worth several times more. Most vending machines, for example, need to install dollar bill readers because their commodities have become more expensive due to inflation, a problem compounded by the bills' often being crumpled, torn, or otherwise unreadable.

Furthermore, the continuation of the dollar bill discourages any meaningful reform of the coinage, as people would be slow to use any dollar coin with the dollar bill still around simply out of habit, as proven with the Sacagawea dollar. Lastly, other countries, including the entire Eurozone, Japan, Australia, Canada, New Zealand, and the United Kingdom, have successfully made similar transitions.

For comparison, here are the lowest-denomination banknotes of some other developed countries (with equivalent U.S. dollar value in exchange, as of August 23, 2015):

Highest value coin table
Currency	Highest value coin	Lowest-denomination banknote
Australian dollar	A$2 (US$1.46)	A$5 (US$3.65)
British pound	£2 (US$3.14)	£5 (US$7.84), £1 (US$ 1.57) in Scotland only
Canadian dollar	CA$2 (US$1.52)	CA$5 (US$3.79)
Euro	€2 (US$2.28)	€5 (US$5.69)
Hong Kong Dollar	HK$10 (US$1.29)	HK$10 (US$1.29)
Japanese yen	¥500 (US$4.09)	¥1,000 (US$8.19)
New Zealand dollar	NZ$2 (US$1.34)	NZ$5 (US$3.34)
Swedish krona	10 kr (US$1.19)	20 kr (US$2.39)
Swiss franc	SFr5 (US$5.28)	SFr10 (US$10.57)
Singapore dollar	S$1.00 (US$0.70)	S$2.00 (US$1.41)

In contrast, poorer countries with weaker currencies, such as Argentina or Ukraine, often have low-valued bills because of inflation having eroded their value.

== See also ==
- Save the Greenback
- Dollar (United States coin)
- United States $1 Coin Act of 1997
- Penny debate in the United States
- Coin Coalition
