= Series of 1928 (United States Currency) =

U.S. banknote series

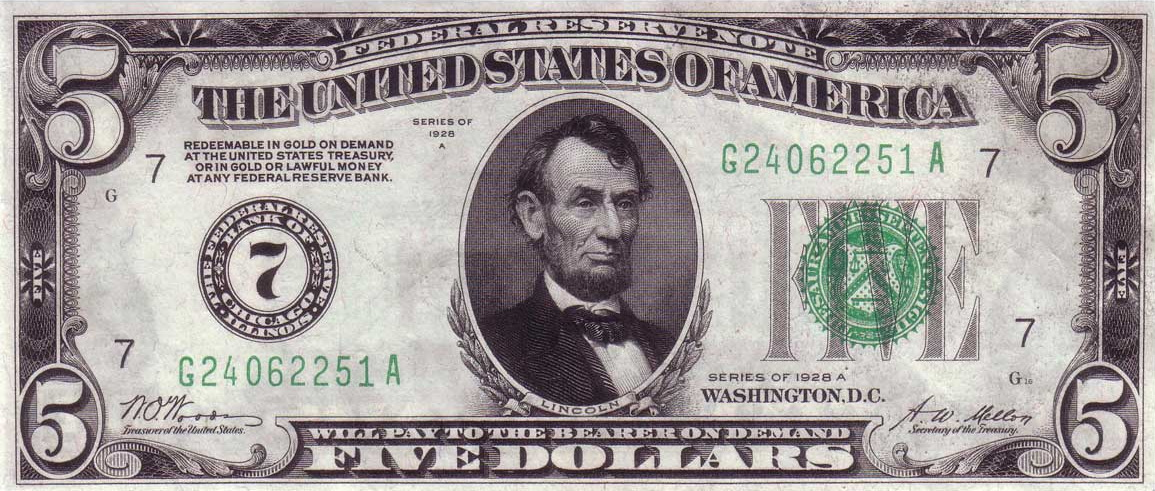
A $5 Federal Reserve Note, Series of 1928A.

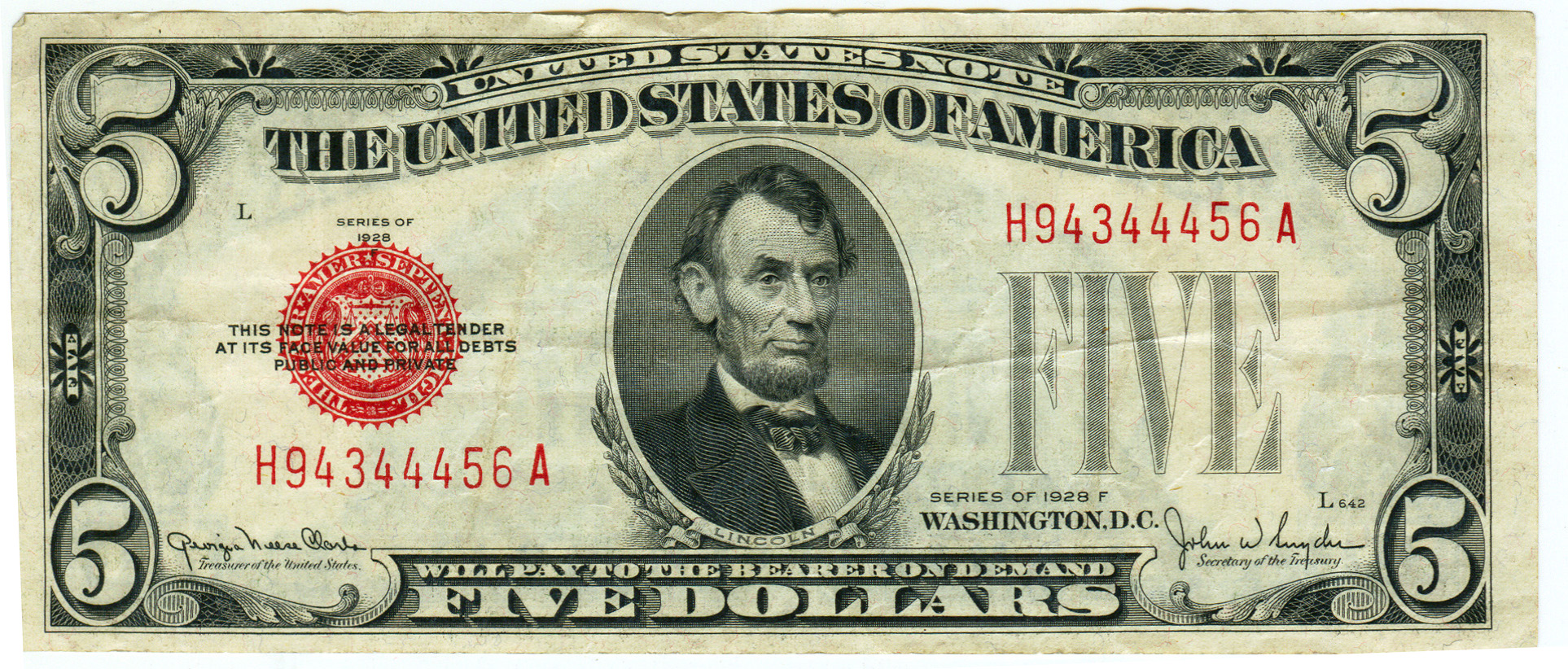
A $5 United States Note, Series of 1928F.

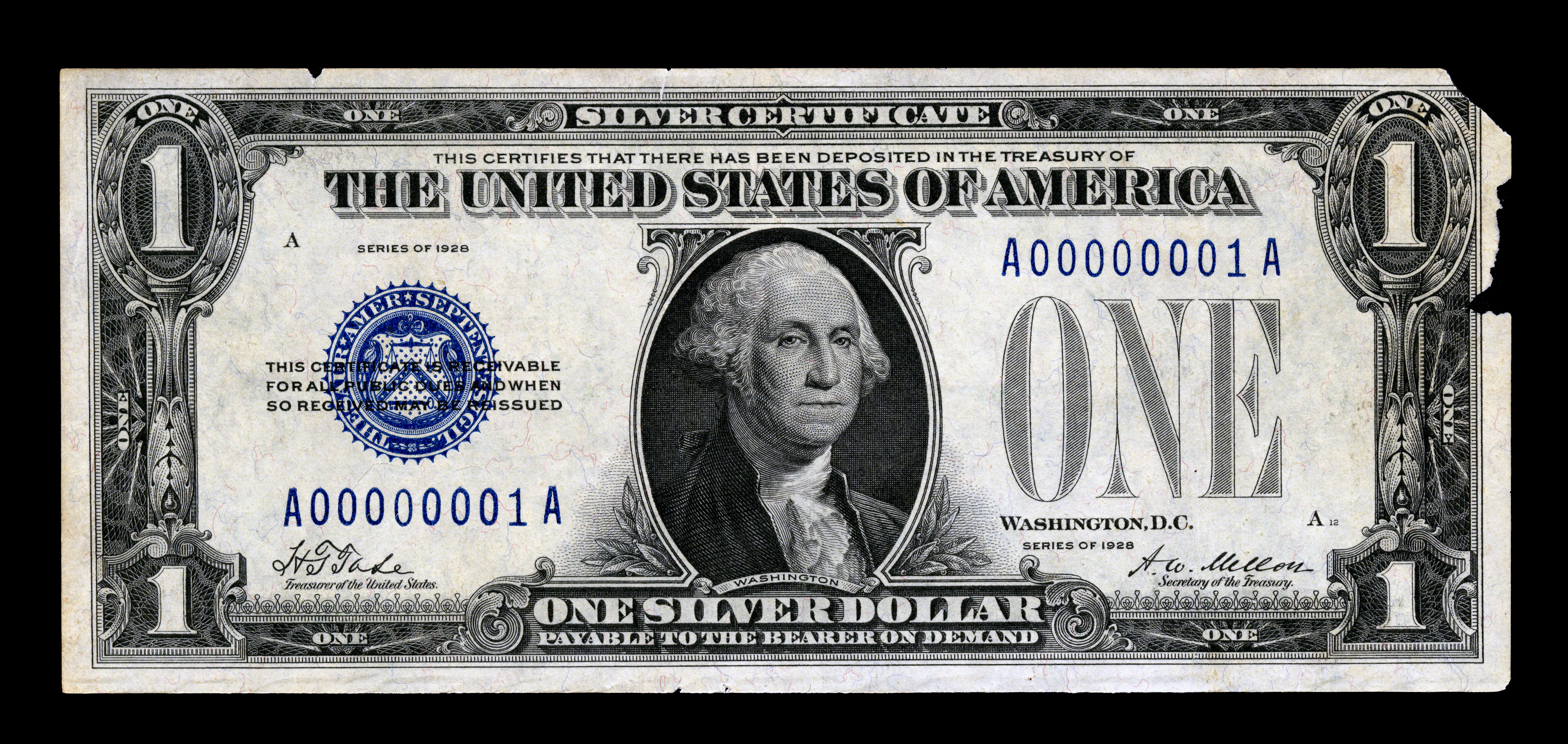
The very first 1928 Silver Certificate issued (i.e., Serial number 1).

The Series of 1928 was the first issue of small-size currency printed and released by the U.S. government. These notes, first released to the public on July 10, 1929, were the first standardized notes in terms of design and characteristics, featuring similar portraits and other facets. These notes were also the first to measure 6.14" by 2.61", smaller than the large-sized predecessors of Series 1923 and earlier that measured 7.375" by 3.125".

Certain one-dollar notes in this series were called Funnybacks.

== Federal Reserve Notes ==
Federal Reserve Notes featured a green Treasury Seal starting in 1928. This was the only type of currency that, at first, featured the seal over the large engraved word to the right of the portrait.

These notes also carried a seal bearing the identity of the Federal Reserve Bank of issuance. The bank was noted in the black, circular seal to the left of the portrait. This can be seen in the picture at the upper right, with a "7" in the seal. The Federal Reserve Bank of Chicago, responsible for the 7th district of the Federal Reserve System, issued this note. The regional seal is a design facet unique to Federal Reserve Notes, because almost all other types of notes were issued directly by the U.S. Treasury.

The 1928 Federal Reserve Notes were redeemable as per the following legend in the upper left corner of the note: Redeemable in gold on demand at the United States Treasury, or in gold or lawful money at any Federal Reserve Bank. While these notes were issued by the Federal Reserve Banks, they were still obligations of the U.S. Government, as stated: The United States of America will pay to the bearer on demand [so many] dollars. This obligation to exchange FRNs for gold ended in the early 1930s as the United States outlawed the private ownership of gold and left the gold standard in response to the Great Depression.

=== Design changes ===
The $5, $10, and $20 denominations were the first to be issued.

- Series of 1928A for $5, $10, and $20 notes resulted from a signature change, and corresponds to Series of 1928 for the $50 and $100 denominations.
- Series of 1928B for $5, $10, and $20 notes; Series of 1928A for $50 and $100 notes; and Series of 1928 for the large denominations reflected a change in the Federal Reserve Seal to contain a letter instead of a number. The four corner numbers were aligned vertically, as well, causing a shift in plate position letters on certain denominations.
- Series of 1928C included only $5, $10, and $20 notes. This series of notes saw very low printing figures as a result of the Great Depression, as only certain districts issued notes. This series, the result of a signature change, is also known for its specific light green Treasury Seal variety.
- Series of 1928D, also the result of a signature change, included only $5 notes and all notes were issued by the Federal Reserve Bank of Atlanta. These 1928D series $5 notes are among the rarest small-size notes in existence today.

=== Series of 1928 Federal Reserve Note denomination set ===
All banknotes in the following table are Series of 1928 Federal Reserve Notes from the National Numismatic Collection at the National Museum of American History (Smithsonian Institution).

Complete denomination type set of 1928 Federal Reserve Notes
Value	Series	Fr.	Image	Portrait
$5	1928B	Fr.1952-J		Abraham Lincoln
$10	1928	Fr.2000-G		Alexander Hamilton
$20	1928	Fr.2050-G		Andrew Jackson
$50	1928	Fr.2100-J		Ulysses S. Grant
$100	1928	Fr.2150-G		Benjamin Franklin
$500	1928	Fr.2200-G		William McKinley
$1,000	1928	Fr.2210-G		Grover Cleveland
$5,000	1928	Fr.2220-G		James Madison
$10,000	1928	Fr.2230-B		Salmon P. Chase

== United States (Legal Tender) Notes ==
Series of 1928 United States Notes were issued in $2 (through 1928G) and $5 (through 1928F) denominations until the early 1950s. Also, for a brief period in 1933, Series of 1928 $1 United States Notes were issued as a response to the Great Depression. Most of these remained in storage before being released in Puerto Rico during 1948-9.

=== Series of 1928 United States Note denomination set ===
Complete denomination type set of 1928 Legal Tender Notes
Value	Series	Fr	Image	Portrait
$1	1928	Fr.1500	$1 United States Note, Series 1928, Fr.1500, depicting George Washington	George Washington
$2	1928	Fr.1501	$2 United States Note, Series 1928, Fr.1501, depicting Thomas Jefferson	Thomas Jefferson
$5	1928	Fr.1525	$5 United States Note, Series 1928, Fr.1525, depicting Abraham Lincoln	Abraham Lincoln

== Silver Certificates and Gold Certificates ==
Series of 1928 through 1928E silver certificates were only issued in the $1 denomination. The design closely followed the 1923 $1 Silver Certificate.

1928 saw the last issuance of Gold Certificates to the public prior to their confiscation during the Great Depression.

=== Series of 1928 Gold Certificate denomination set ===
Complete denomination type set of 1928 Gold Certificates
Value	Series	Fr	Image	Portrait
$10	1928	Fr.2400	$10 Gold Certificate, Series 1928, Fr.2400, depicting Alexander Hamilton	Alexander Hamilton
$20	1928	Fr.2402	$20 Gold Certificate, Series 1928, Fr.2402, depicting Andrew Jackson	Andrew Jackson
$50	1928	Fr.2404	$50 Gold Certificate, Series 1928, Fr.2404, depicting Ulysses Grant	Ulysses S. Grant
$100	1928	Fr.2405	$100 Gold Certificate, Series 1928, Fr.2405, depicting Benjamin Franklin	Benjamin Franklin
$500	1928	Fr.2407	$500 Gold Certificate, Series 1928, Fr.2407, depicting William McKinley	William McKinley
$1,000	1928	Fr.2408	$1,000 Gold Certificate, Series 1928, Fr.2408, depicting Grover Cleveland	Grover Cleveland
$5,000	1928	Fr.2410	$5,000 Gold Certificate, Series 1928, Fr.2410, depicting James Madison	James Madison
$10,000	1928	Fr.2411	$10,000 Gold Certificate, Series 1928, Fr.2411, depicting Salmon P. Chase	Salmon P. Chase

== Gallery ==
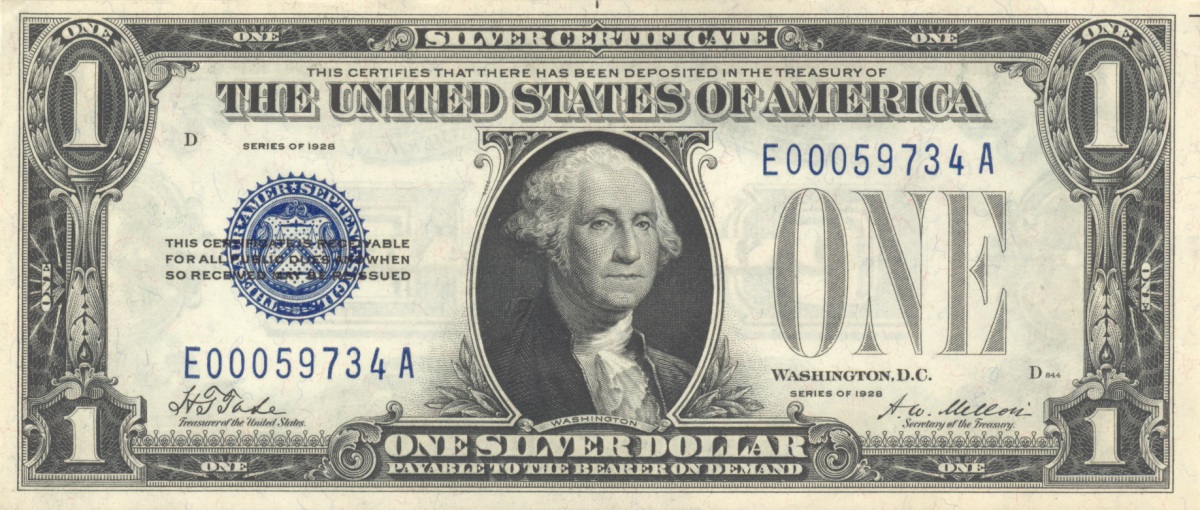
A $1 Silver Certificate, Series of 1928.

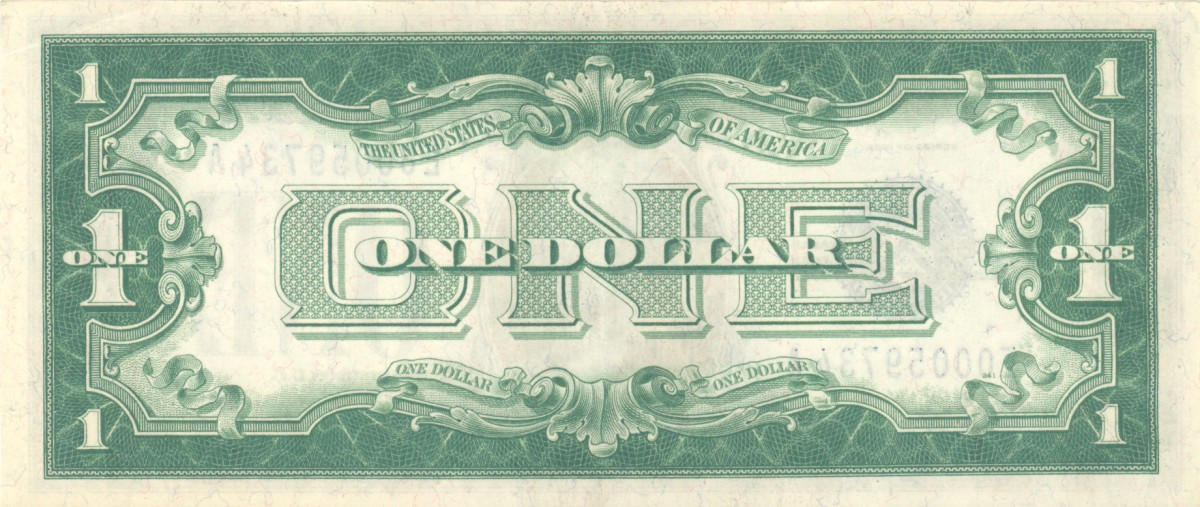
Common reverse of 1928 $1 Silver Certificates and $1 United States Notes.
