= United States $1 Coin Act of 1997 =

The United States $1 Coin Act of 1997 (part of Pub. L. 105–124 (text) (PDF)) was legislation passed by the United States Congress providing for a redesigned gold colored coin with a distinctive new rim. A major purpose of the Act was to allow for the replacement of the Susan B. Anthony dollar. The stockpiles of that coin had been depleted to the point that minting new coins would soon be required. The Sacagawea dollar was introduced as a result of the Act.

== Debate ==
On October 21, 1997, Congress held hearings on the Act. The most contentious issue was whether or not to amend the Act to mandate phasing out the U.S. one-dollar bill. Rep. Jim Kolbe attributed the Susan B. Anthony dollar's failure to the fact that it looked and felt like the quarter and the simultaneous circulation of the dollar bill. Kolbe recommended phasing out the paper dollar, warning that the Sacagawea would face the same fate as its predecessor if the bill remained in circulation. He refuted his opponents arguments that forcing a switch from the paper dollar to the dollar coin would take away consumers' choice by declaring, "when they introduce legislation to create paper pennies, paper nickels, paper dimes, paper quarters, and when they have coins for one-, two-, five-, ten-, twenty-, fifty-, even one-hundred-dollar bills, then I'll be convinced that they truly believe in giving choice to the American people—when we have a choice in every single piece of currency that we have. Where is the logic as to why only the one-dollar bill should be the only choice?" Kolbe also pointed to the success of Canadian loonie, which was extremely unpopular at the time it was introduced. He said that because of the US's antiquated currency system, more and more universities and other communities were switching to debit cards and other cashless methods of exchange.

Rep. Thomas M. Davis then spoke against phasing out the dollar bill. He noted that numerous polls indicated strong public preference for the paper dollar. Davis pointed out that even countries with dollar coin equivalents were switching to smart cards. He also reiterated the argument, "The American people clearly don't want to be told what kind of money they're allowed to use."

Theodore E. Allison, Assistant to the Board of Governors of the Federal Reserve System, pointed out that focus groups of consumers and retailers had expressed reservations about the Susan B. Anthony dollar even before it was introduced, due its similarity to the quarter, and that replacing the coin with one of markedly different dimensions would be inappropriate, because it would require costly refitting of vending machines. Allison recommended against phasing out the paper dollar, citing public opposition to the phaseout. However, he noted that "the Government's financial position, and, therefore, taxpayers, would benefit financially if, and to the extent that, the availability of a more acceptable dollar coin either caused dollar coins to substitute for dollar notes more than would be the case without it or caused the total circulation of dollar notes and dollar coins to increase further than would have been the case otherwise." When asked to elaborate, Allison said:

Suppose the total amount of coins went up. That would provide a means of financing expenditures for the Treasury that didn't exist before; that is, the Treasury can in effect spend. Let's say there were another one billion coins, the Treasury could, in effect, spend—on goods, services, salaries, anything it wants to buy—a billion dollars without having to borrow the money to do it. And, therefore, it would save the interest cost on a billion dollars of debt that is avoided, in the case of a billion more coins. I'm not predicting that there would be a billion more coins, but just to put this in the perspective of some possible number.

Rep. Jack Metcalf then began questioning Allison about these issues in more detail. Allison explained that when the United States Mint produces a dollar coin, it spends 8 cents on production costs and issues the coin into circulation at face value (100 cents), depositing the coin in the Federal Reserve for 100 cents. The 92-cent difference is seigniorage; essentially profit. In the case of a dollar bill, on the other hand, the cost of producing the bill is 4 cents, and the Federal Reserve issues the bill into circulation at face value, investing the 96 cents difference in U.S. Government bonds. The interest the Federal Reserve receives goes to Federal Reserve expenses (about $2 billion), retained earnings (a few hundred million), dividends to member banks (another few hundred million); the rest goes back to the Treasury. Metcalf noted, "It seems like an arcane system that could have been invented only by somebody who was mentally deranged."

Alfred A. Outlaw, a representative from SEPTA, then spoke in favor of eliminating the dollar bill. He explained:

The cost to process one thousand dollars' worth of one-dollar bills at SEPTA is approximately $10.11. The cost to process the same amount in coins is $1.22. The reason for the large difference is that handling paper currency is more labor-intensive. Coin processing is more efficient due to the higher degree of technology and availability of counting machines. I don't know of any technology that will fully process paper currency and meet the Federal Reserve's acceptance requirements that all paper currency is faced when stacked. This simply means all one-dollar bills must be stacked with the portrait of George Washington facing the same direction. Therefore, our note processors must stack and face all bills by hand.

He also pointed out, "The additional problems with paper currencies are it jams our fareboxes, and it is easy to steal. As a result, there is additional cost for theft deterrent equipment and an increase in maintenance costs associated with the use of one-dollar bills. I speak without hesitation that transportation authorities across this Nation would love to substitute dollar coins for dollar bills."

Jim Benfield of the Coin Coalition then spoke in favor of eliminating the dollar bill. He compared the situation to the situation video rental stores were in when both VHS and Betamax were circulating. It was inefficient to stock both, so eventually they scrapped Betamax and went with VHS. Similarly, retailers find it inefficient to handle both dollar bills and dollar coins, so they will not switch to dollar coins until dollar bills are phased out.

David Clayton, owner of Automatic Food Service in Nashville, Tennessee, then spoke in favor of eliminating the paper dollar. He said, "Until the coin circulates widely, our industry will continue to be burdened by the capital investment, high operating costs and customer frustration and inconvenience in using the one-dollar bill... In the early 1960s, one coin, a quarter, could buy a candy bar and a soft drink. Today, the average selling price of a single product is more than sixty cents, necessitating a minimum of three coins to make a single purchase. As a consequence, we have been forced to add bill acceptors costing nearly $400 to virtually every machine."

Clayton pointed out the continuing costs associated with bill validators, saying, "They have made great strides and improved the bill acceptors over the years, but, at the same time, the bulk of, I would say, about 40 percent of my service calls and maintenance and upkeep, those calls are still on bill acceptors. So, they're costing us not only to install, to accept the dollar bill in the beginning, but also to maintain and keep them working so that our customers aren't unhappy."

== See also ==
- Dollar coin (United States)
  - Presidential $1 Coin Program
- United States one-dollar bill
- Save the Greenback Act
