= United States one-dollar bill =

Denomination of United States currency

One dollar
- Country: United States
- Value: $1
- Width: 6.14 inches ≈ 156 mm
- Height: 2.61 inches ≈ 66.3 mm
- Weight: Approx. 1 g
- Security features: Security fibers, raised printing
- Material used: 75% cotton 25% linen
- Years of printing: 1929–present (Small size)

Obverse
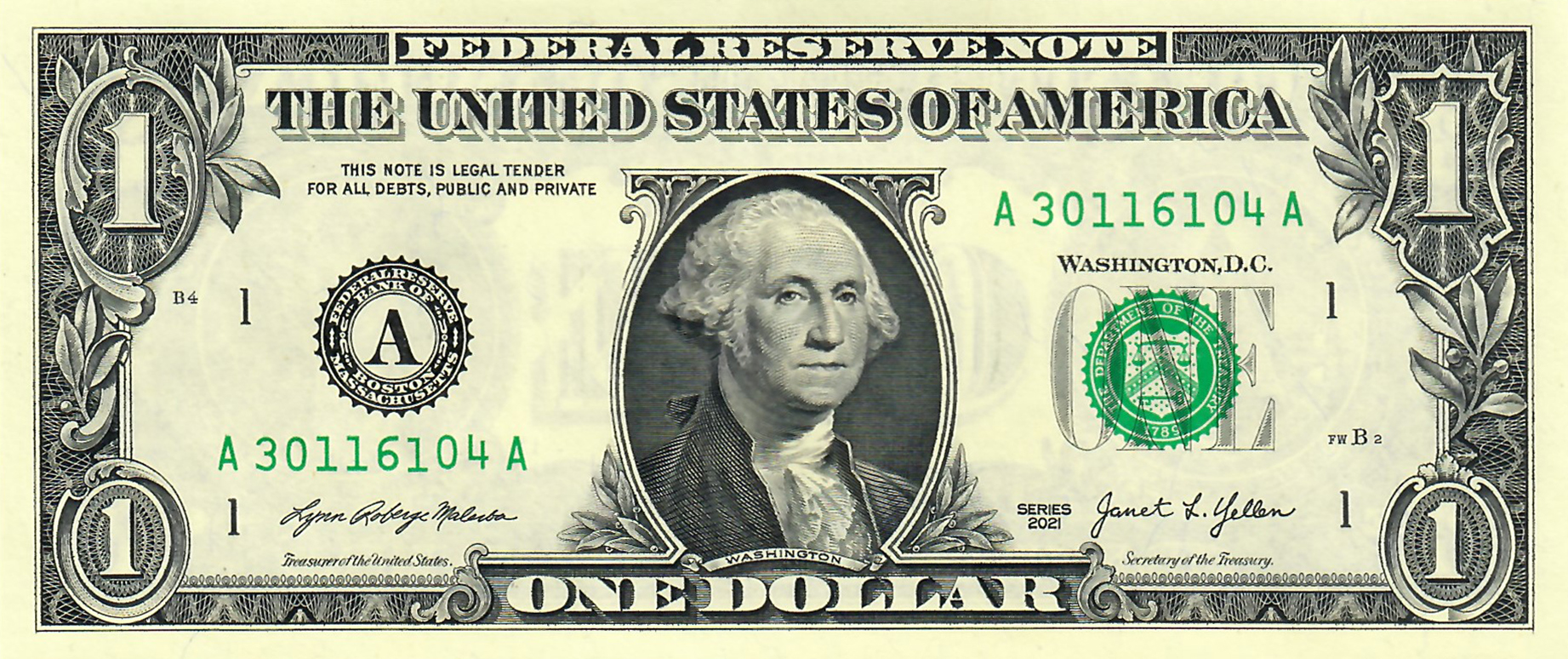
- Design: George Washington
- Design date: 1963; 63 years ago

Reverse
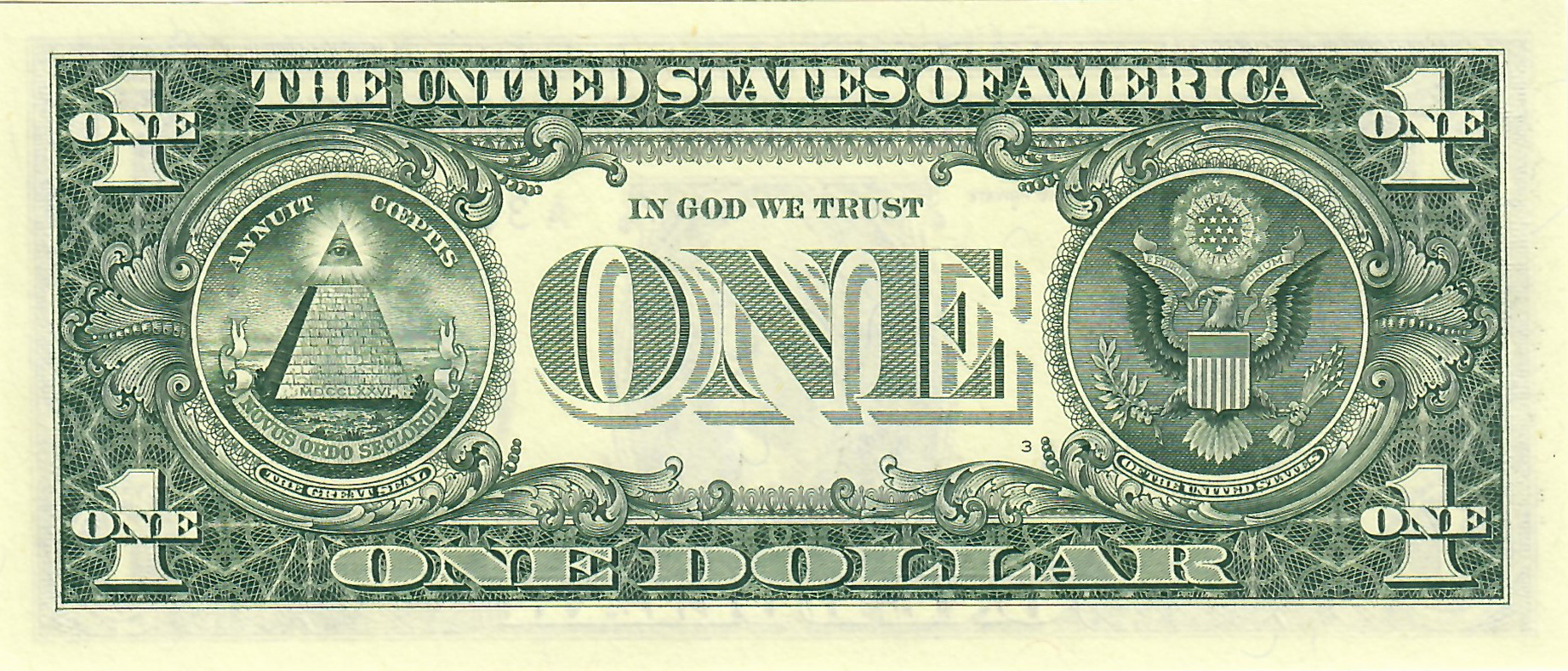
- Design: Great Seal of the United States
- Design date: 1935; 91 years ago

The United States one-dollar bill has been the lowest value denomination of United States paper currency since the discontinuation of U.S. fractional currency notes in 1876. The obverse shows the first U.S. president (1789–1797), George Washington, based on the 1796 Athenaeum Portrait by Gilbert Stuart, and the reverse shows the Great Seal of the United States. The one-dollar bill has the oldest overall design of all U.S. currency currently in use. The reverse design of the present dollar debuted in 1935, and the obverse in 1963 when it was first issued as a Federal Reserve Note (previously, one-dollar bills were Silver Certificates).

A dollar bill is composed of 25% linen and 75% cotton. That blend makes the notes more difficult to counterfeit compared to paper (as well as increasing its durability). As of December 31, 2018, the average life of a dollar bill in circulation is 6.6 years before it is replaced due to wear. Approximately 42% of all U.S. currency produced in 2009 were one-dollar bills. As of December 31, 2019, there were 12.7 billion one-dollar bills in circulation worldwide.

== History ==
=== Large-size notes ===
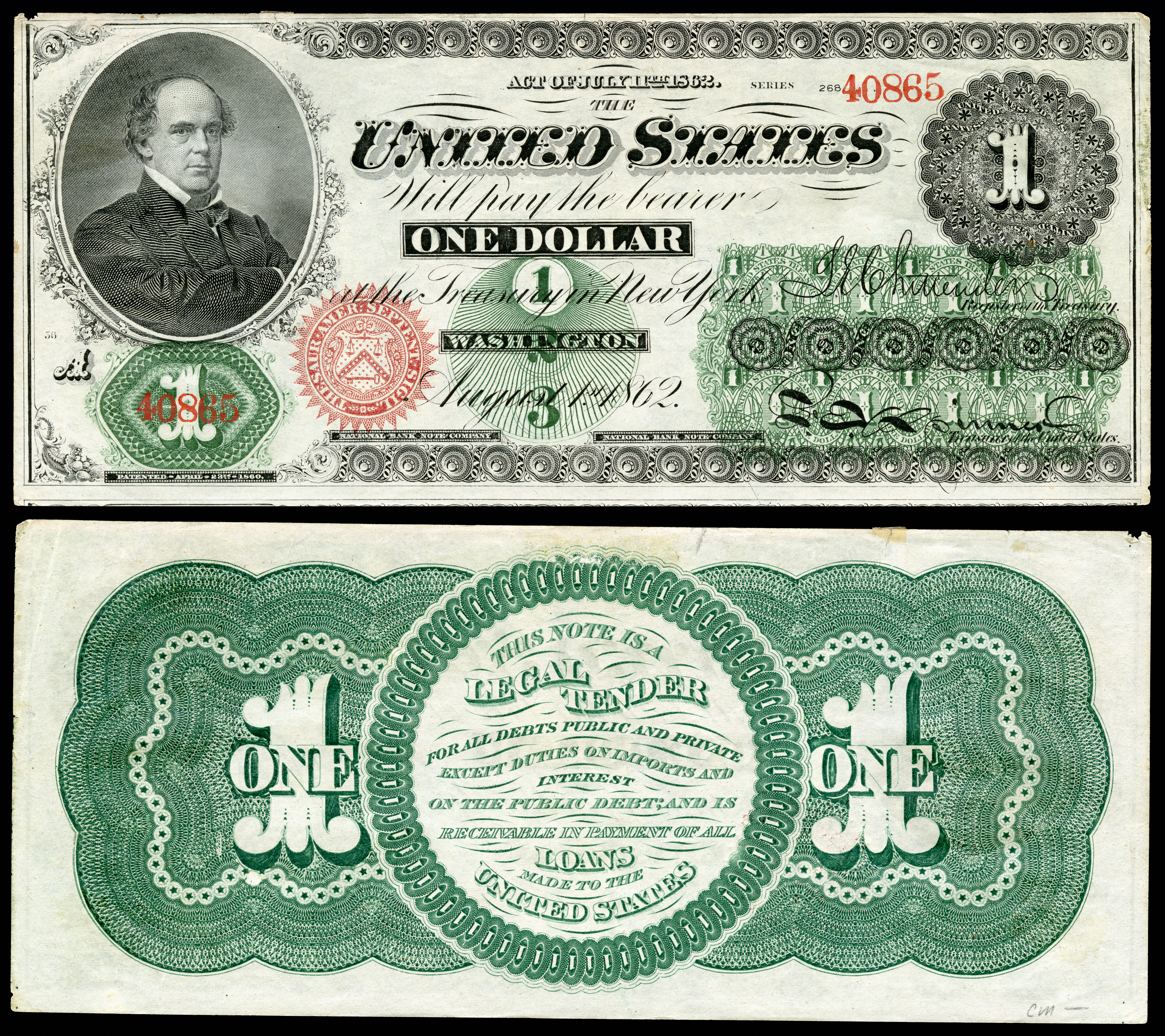
First variant of the $1 bill issued in 1862 as a Legal Tender Note

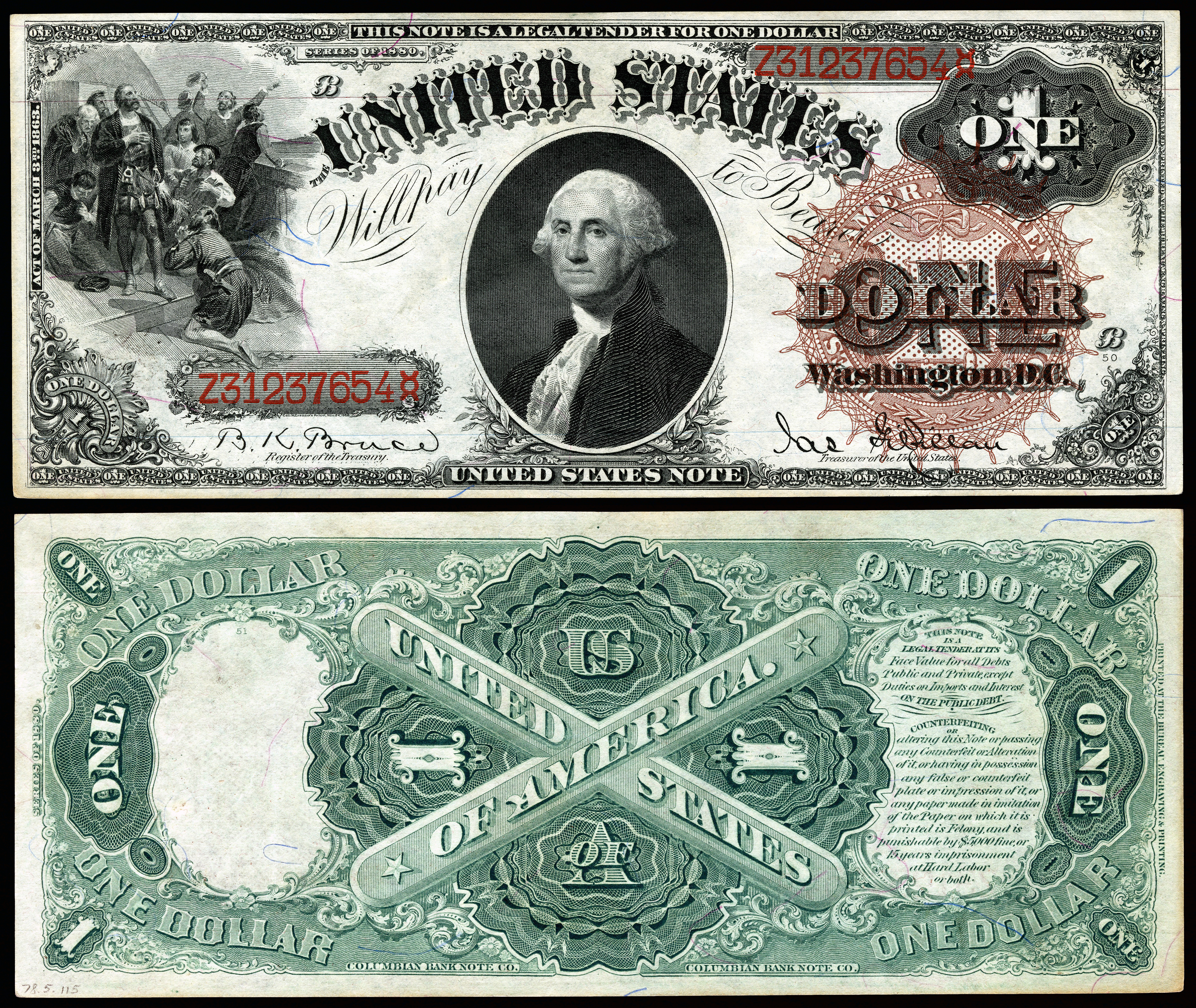
Series 1880 $1 Legal Tender

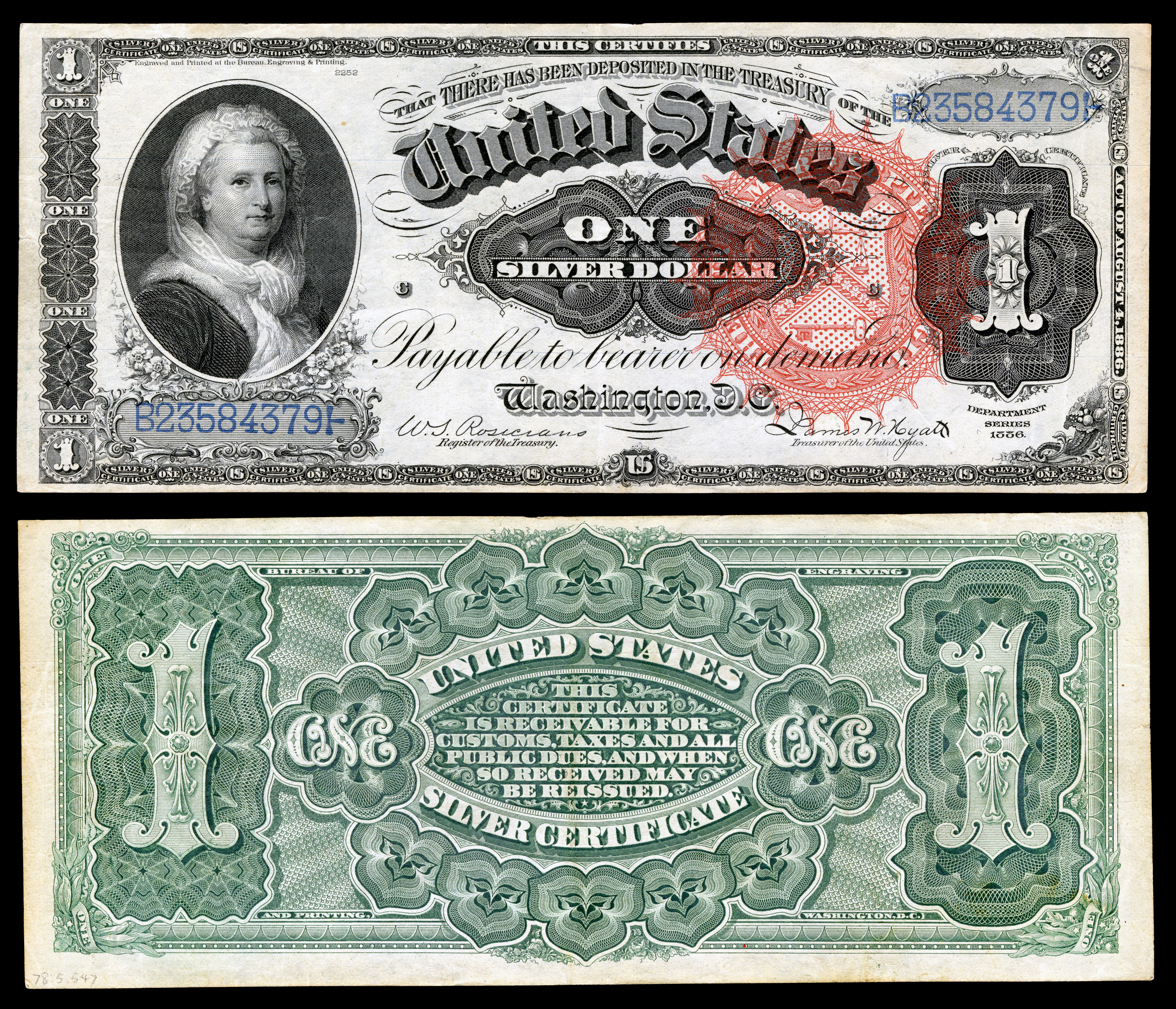
Series of 1886 $1 Silver Certificate featuring Martha Washington

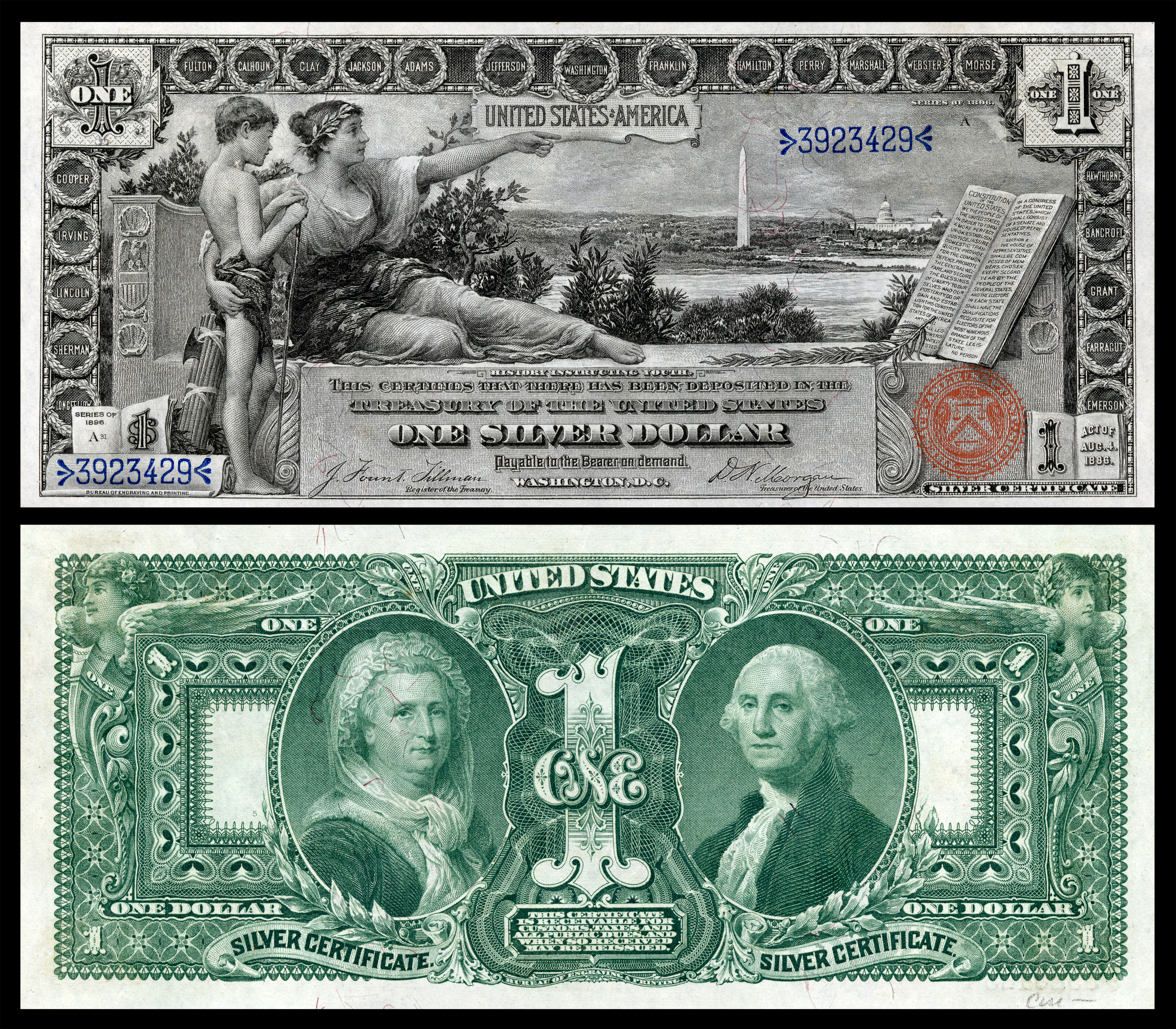
Famous 1896 "Educational Series" $1 Silver Certificate

(approximately 7 3/8 in × 3 1/8 in or 187 mm × 79 mm)

- 1862: The first one-dollar bill was issued as a Legal Tender Note (United States Note) with a portrait of Salmon P. Chase, the Secretary of the Treasury who served under President Abraham Lincoln.
- 1869: The $1 United States Note was redesigned with a portrait of George Washington in the center and a vignette of Christopher Columbus sighting land to the left. The obverse of the note also featured overprinting of the word ONE numerous times in very small green type and blue tinting of the paper. Although this note is technically a United States Note, TREASURY NOTE appeared on it instead of UNITED STATES NOTE.
- 1874: The Series of 1869 United States Note was revised. Changes on the obverse included removing the green and blue tinting, adding a red floral design around the word WASHINGTON D.C., and changing the term TREASURY NOTE to UNITED STATES NOTE. The reverse was completely redesigned. This note was also issued as Series of 1875 and 1878.
- 1880: The red floral design around the words ONE DOLLAR and WASHINGTON D.C. on the United States Note was removed and replaced with a large red seal. Later versions also had blue serial numbers and a small seal moved to the left side of the note.
- 1886: The first woman to appear on U.S. currency, Martha Washington, was featured on the $1 silver certificate. The reverse of the note featured an ornate design that occupied the entire note, excluding the borders.
- 1890: One-dollar Treasury or "Coin Notes" were issued for government purchases of silver bullion from the silver mining industry. The reverse featured the large word ONE in the center surrounded by an ornate design that occupied almost the entire note.
- 1891: The reverse of the Series of 1890 Treasury Note was redesigned because the treasury felt that it was too "busy," which would make it too easy to counterfeit. More open space was incorporated into the new design. The obverse was largely unchanged.
- 1896: The famous "Educational Series" Silver Certificate was issued. The entire obverse was covered with artwork of allegorical figures representing "history instructing youth" in front of Washington D.C. The reverse featured portraits of George and Martha Washington surrounded by an ornate design that occupied almost the entire note.
- 1899: The $1 was again redesigned: the redesigned note was called the Black Eagle Silver Certificate. The obverse featured a vignette of the United States Capitol behind a bald eagle perched on an American flag. Below that were small portraits of Abraham Lincoln to the left and Ulysses S. Grant to the right.
- 1917: The obverse of the $1 United States Note was changed slightly with the removal of ornamental frames that surrounded the serial numbers.
- 1918: The only large-sized, Federal Reserve Note-like $1 bill was issued as a Federal Reserve Bank Note (not to be confused with Federal Reserve Notes). Each note was an obligation of the issuing Federal Reserve Bank and could only be redeemed at that corresponding bank. The obverse of the note featured a borderless portrait of George Washington to the left and wording in the entire center. The reverse featured a bald eagle in flight clutching an American flag.
- 1923: Both the one-dollar United States Note and Silver Certificate were redesigned. Both notes featured the same reverse and an almost identical obverse with the same border design and portrait of George Washington. The only difference between the two notes was the color of ink used for the numeral 1 crossed by the word DOLLAR, Treasury seal, and serial numbers along with the wording of the obligations. These dollar bills were the first and only large-size notes with a standardized design for different types of notes of the same denomination; this same concept would later be used on small-size notes.

=== Small size notes ===
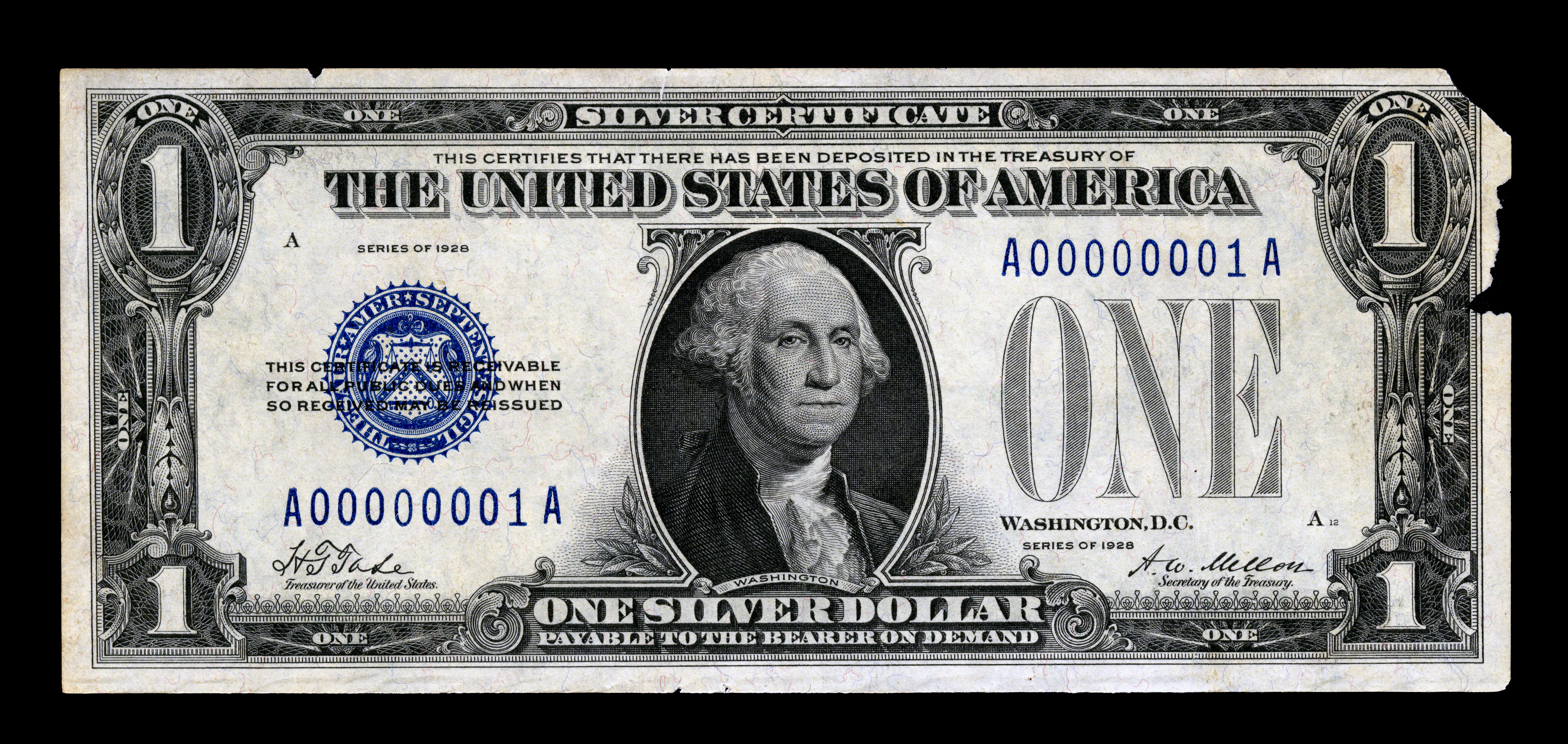
The first small-size $1 Silver Certificate

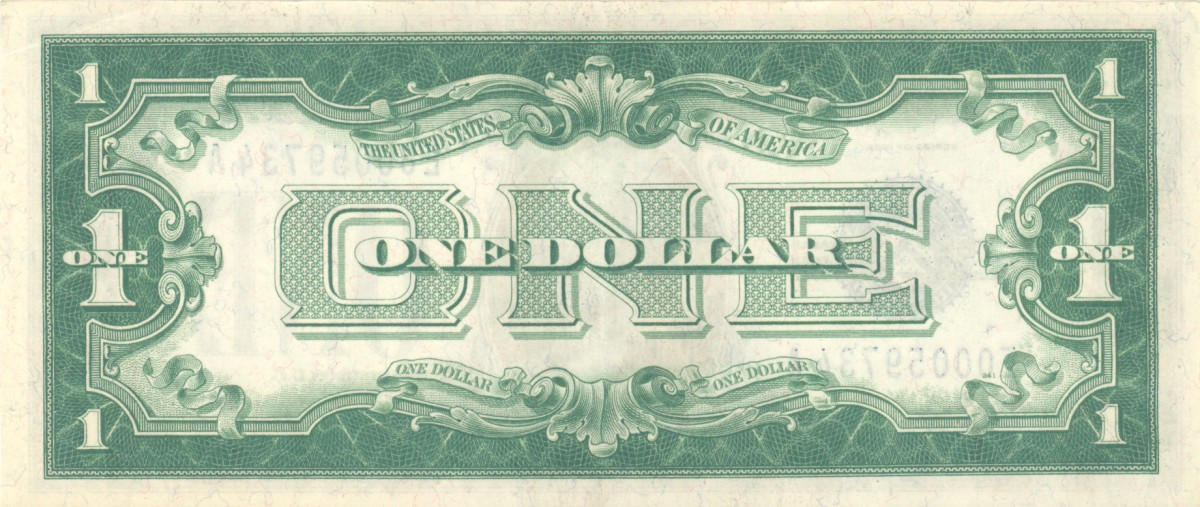
Common reverse of $1 Silver Certificates (Series of 1928-1934) and $1 United States Notes (Series of 1928), commonly referred to as "Funnybacks"

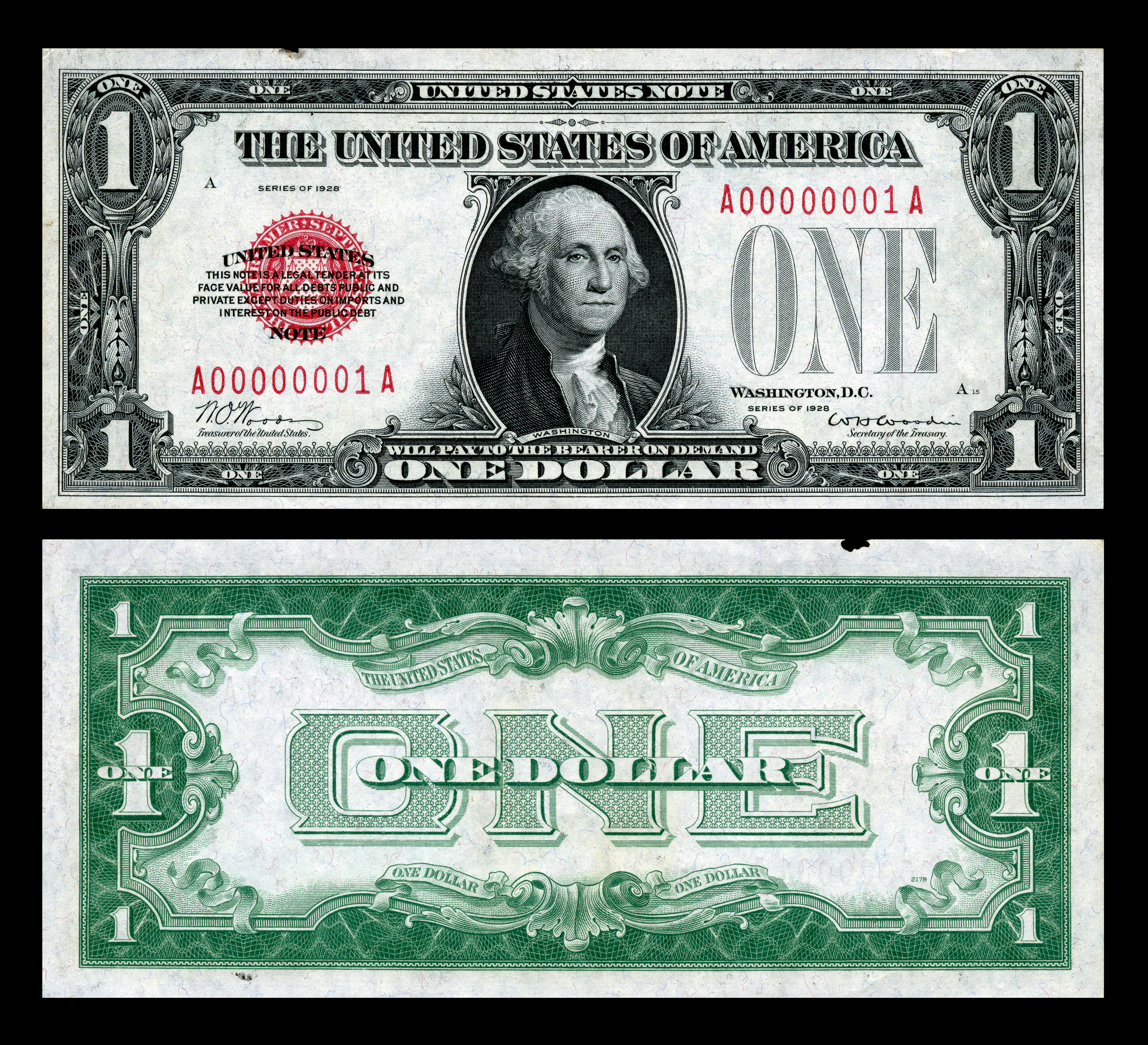
The first small-size $1 United States Banknote printed

(6.14 length × 2.61 width × 0.0043 in thickness = 156 × 66.3 × 0.11 mm)

In 1928, all currency was changed to the size which is familiar today. The first one-dollar bills were issued as silver certificates under Series of 1928. The Treasury seal and serial numbers were dark blue. The obverse was nearly identical to the Series of 1923 $1 silver certificate, but the Treasury seal featured spikes around it and a large gray ONE replaced the blue "1 DOLLAR." The reverse, too, had the same border design as the Series of 1923 $1 bill, but the center featured a large ornate ONE superimposed by ONE DOLLAR. These are commonly known as "Funnybacks" due to the rather odd-looking "ONE" on the reverse. These $1 silver certificates were issued until 1934.

In 1933, Series of 1928 $1 United States Notes were issued to supplement the supply of $1 Silver Certificates. Its Treasury seal and serial numbers were red and there was different wording on the obverse of the note. However, a month after their production, it was realized that there would be no real need for these notes and production was stopped. A small number of these $1 bills entered circulation and the rest were kept in Treasury vaults until 1949 when they were issued in Puerto Rico.

In 1934, the design of the $1 silver certificate was changed. This occurred with that year's passage of the Silver Purchase Act, which led to a large increase in dollar bills backed by that metal. Under Washington's portrait, ONE SILVER DOLLAR was changed to ONE DOLLAR. The Treasury seal was moved to the right and superimposed over ONE, and a blue numeral 1 was added to the left. The reverse remained the same.

A year later, in 1935, the design of the one-dollar bill was changed again. On the obverse, the blue numeral 1 was changed to gray and made smaller, the gray ONE to the right was removed, the Treasury seal was made smaller and superimposed by WASHINGTON D.C., and a stylized ONE DOLLAR was added over the Treasury seal. The reverse was also changed to its current design, except for the absence of IN GOD WE TRUST.

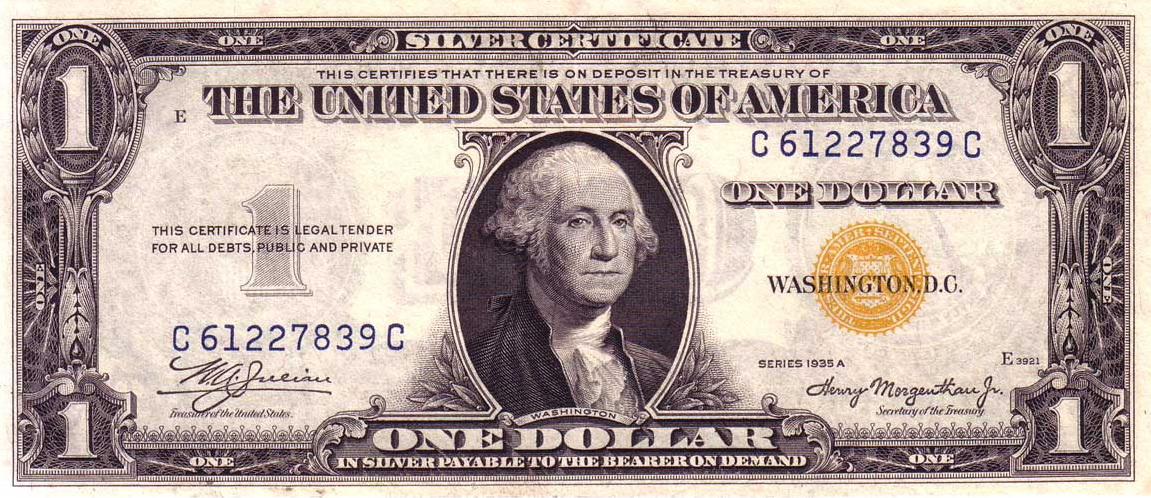
Special issue $1 Silver Certificate for Allied troops in North Africa

World War II brought about special issues of one-dollar bills in 1942. Special $1 Silver Certificates were issued for Hawaii in case of a Japanese invasion. HAWAII was printed vertically on the left and right side of the obverse and also horizontally across the reverse. The seal and serial numbers were changed to brown. Special Silver Certificates were also issued as payment for Allied troops in North Africa about to begin their assault into Europe, being distinguishable from regular Silver Certificates by their yellow seals; unlike the Hawaii overprint series, the remainder of the design was left unchanged. Both of these types of notes could be declared worthless if they fell into enemy hands.

The next change came in 1957 when the $1 bill became the first piece of paper U.S. currency to bear the motto, IN GOD WE TRUST. The inclusion of the motto on all currency was required by law in 1955, It was added over the word ONE on the reverse. Thus all series 1957 and later notes include the motto. Initially the BEP began printing the motto on notes printed with the new 32 note press, but soon Series of 1935G bills printed on an 18 note press featured the motto too. Later the 1935H series was printed only with the motto. The reason these 1935 series notes were produced into the 1960s was that older printing plates were used as long as possible. There is no particular difference in value if a bill does or does not have the motto.

The final production of $1 Silver Certificates occurred in late 1963. In 1964, the redemption of Silver Certificates for silver coin ended and in 1968 the redemption of Silver Certificates for silver bullion ended.

Production of one-dollar Federal Reserve Notes was undertaken in late 1963 to replace the soon-to-be obsolete $1 Silver Certificate. The design on the reverse remained the same, but the border design on the obverse underwent considerable modification, as the mostly abstract filigrees were replaced with designs that were mostly botanical in nature. In addition, the word "one", which appeared eight times around the border in small type, was eliminated. The serial numbers and Treasury seal were printed in green ink. This was the first time the one-dollar bill was printed as a Federal Reserve Note.

The first change since then came in 1969, when the $1 was among all denominations of Federal Reserve Notes to feature the new Treasury seal, with English wording instead of Latin.

The $1 bill became the first denomination printed at the new Western Currency Facility in February 1991, when a shipment of 3.2 million star notes from the Dallas FRB was produced.

Though bill denominations of $5 and higher have been redesigned twice since 1995 as part of ongoing anti-counterfeiting efforts, there are currently no plans to redesign the $1 or $2 bills.

==== Experimental issues ====
Since 1933, the one-dollar bill has been the exclusive experimental denomination among circulating US currency (except for the Natick experiment in 1981, see below). The first experiment was conducted in January and February of that year to assess the effects of using different ratios of cotton to linen in the make-up of the bills. Series 1928A and 1928B $1 silver certificates with serial number block letters X-B and Y-B were used as the experimental group; the Z-B block was used as the control group. The results of the experiment were inconclusive.

In 1937, another test was conducted, similar in style to the 1933 experiment. This test used Series 1935 one-dollar bills. The particular notes used in this experiment can be identified by their serial numbers. Notes ranging from A00000001B to A06180000B and B00000001B–B03300000B were the experimental group and notes ranging from C00000001B to C03300000B were part of the control group. No conclusive results were found.

A better known test was done in 1942 during World War II to test alternative types of paper. This was a precautionary measure in case the current type of paper supply could not be maintained. Series 1935A notes made of the special paper and were printed with a red "S" to the right of the Treasury seal, while notes of the control group were printed with a red R. Because they have some collector value, fake red S's and R's have been applied to regular Series 1935A notes to try to pass them at a higher value; checking a note's serial numbers can prevent this. Serial numbers of the R group range from S70884001C to S72068000C and serial numbers of the S group range from S73884001C to S75068000C.

Sometime in the early to mid-1960s, the BEP experimented with a new firm, the Gilbert Paper Company, to see if they could duplicate the usual paper production. The BEP selected a sequence of notes printed for the Philadelphia FRB (series 1963) as the test subjects. Serial numbers for this group range from C60800001A to C61440000A.

In August 1981, a similar experiment occurred during production of Series 1977A, when the BEP printed a few print runs on Natick paper. They included a regular run and a star note run from the Richmond FRB, with serial numbers ranging from E76800001H through E80640000H and E07052001* through E07680000* (many sources incorrectly identify the star range as Philadelphia instead of Richmond). One print run of $10 star notes, also from Richmond, was included in this paper test, making it so far the only experimental printing not exclusive to the $1.

One-dollar bills were again the subject of experimentation in May 1992, when the BEP began to test a web-fed Intaglio printing press. Because of a need for greater quantities of $1 FRNs, the BEP sent out REQUEST FOR PROPOSALS (RFP) (year 1985) NO. BEP-85-73 to procure a web-fed intaglio printing press to dramatically increase the production of currency notes within the confines of their current (1985) 14th & C street facility. Instead of printing one side of a square sheet of 32 notes at a time, the web-fed press used 96 engraved images or plate-cylinder to print the back of the note, then another 96 image engraved plate-cylinder to print the front of the note. Both sides of notes were printed from a continuous roll of paper. The Alexander-Hamilton intaglio Web press printed both sides of intaglio at the same time. The web-press was designed as a full-blown production press as opposed to an experimental press. The notes were issued in Series 1988A, 1993, and 1995. Because of mechanical problems and operator error, as well as the sometimes poor quality of the notes, production was ended in July 1996. Web notes can be identified by the back plate number next to IN GOD WE TRUST and the removal of face check letters and quadrant numbers.

=== Series dates ===
==== Small size ====
Type	Series	Treasurer	Secretary	Seal
Legal Tender Note	1928	Woods	Woodin	Red
Silver Certificate	1928	Tate	Mellon	Blue
Silver Certificate	1928A	Woods	Mellon	Blue
Silver Certificate	1928B	Woods	Mills	Blue
Silver Certificate	1928C	Woods	Woodin	Blue
Silver Certificate	1928D	Julian	Woodin	Blue
Silver Certificate	1928E	Julian	Morgenthau	Blue
Silver Certificate	1934	Julian	Morgenthau	Blue
Silver Certificate	1935	Julian	Morgenthau	Blue
Silver Certificate	1935A	Julian	Morgenthau	Blue
Silver Certificate	1935A Hawaii	Julian	Morgenthau	Brown
Silver Certificate	1935A North Africa	Julian	Morgenthau	Yellow
Silver Certificate	1935B	Julian	Vinson	Blue
Silver Certificate	1935C	Julian	Snyder	Blue
Silver Certificate	1935D Wide Border	Clark	Snyder	Blue
Silver Certificate	1935D Narrow Border	Clark	Snyder	Blue
Silver Certificate	1935E	Priest	Humphrey	Blue
Silver Certificate	1935F	Priest	Anderson	Blue
Silver Certificate	1935G No Motto	Smith	Dillon	Blue
Silver Certificate	1935G Motto	Smith	Dillon	Blue
Silver Certificate	1935H	Granahan	Dillon	Blue
Silver Certificate	1957	Priest	Anderson	Blue
Silver Certificate	1957A	Smith	Dillon	Blue
Silver Certificate	1957B	Granahan	Dillon	Blue
Federal Reserve Note	1963	Granahan	Dillon	Green
Federal Reserve Note	1963A	Granahan	Fowler	Green
Federal Reserve Note	1963B	Granahan	Barr	Green
Federal Reserve Note	1969	Elston	Kennedy	Green
Federal Reserve Note	1969A	Kabis	Kennedy	Green
Federal Reserve Note	1969B	Kabis	Connally	Green
Federal Reserve Note	1969C	Bañuelos	Connally	Green
Federal Reserve Note	1969D	Bañuelos	Shultz	Green
Federal Reserve Note	1974	Neff	Simon	Green
Federal Reserve Note	1977	Morton	Blumenthal	Green
Federal Reserve Note	1977A	Morton	Miller	Green
Federal Reserve Note	1981	Buchanan	Regan	Green
Federal Reserve Note	1981A	Ortega	Regan	Green
Federal Reserve Note	1985	Ortega	Baker	Green
Federal Reserve Note	1988	Ortega	Brady	Green
Federal Reserve Note	1988A	Villalpando	Brady	Green
Federal Reserve Note	1993	Withrow	Bentsen	Green
Federal Reserve Note	1995	Withrow	Rubin	Green
Federal Reserve Note	1999	Withrow	Summers	Green
Federal Reserve Note	2001	Marin	O'Neill	Green
Federal Reserve Note	2003	Marin	Snow	Green
Federal Reserve Note	2003A	Cabral	Snow	Green
Federal Reserve Note	2006	Cabral	Paulson	Green
Federal Reserve Note	2009	Rios	Geithner	Green
Federal Reserve Note	2013	Rios	Lew	Green
Federal Reserve Note	2017	Carranza	Mnuchin	Green
Federal Reserve Note	2017A	Carranza	Mnuchin	Green
Federal Reserve Note	2021	Malerba	Yellen	Green

== Obverse of current $1 bill ==
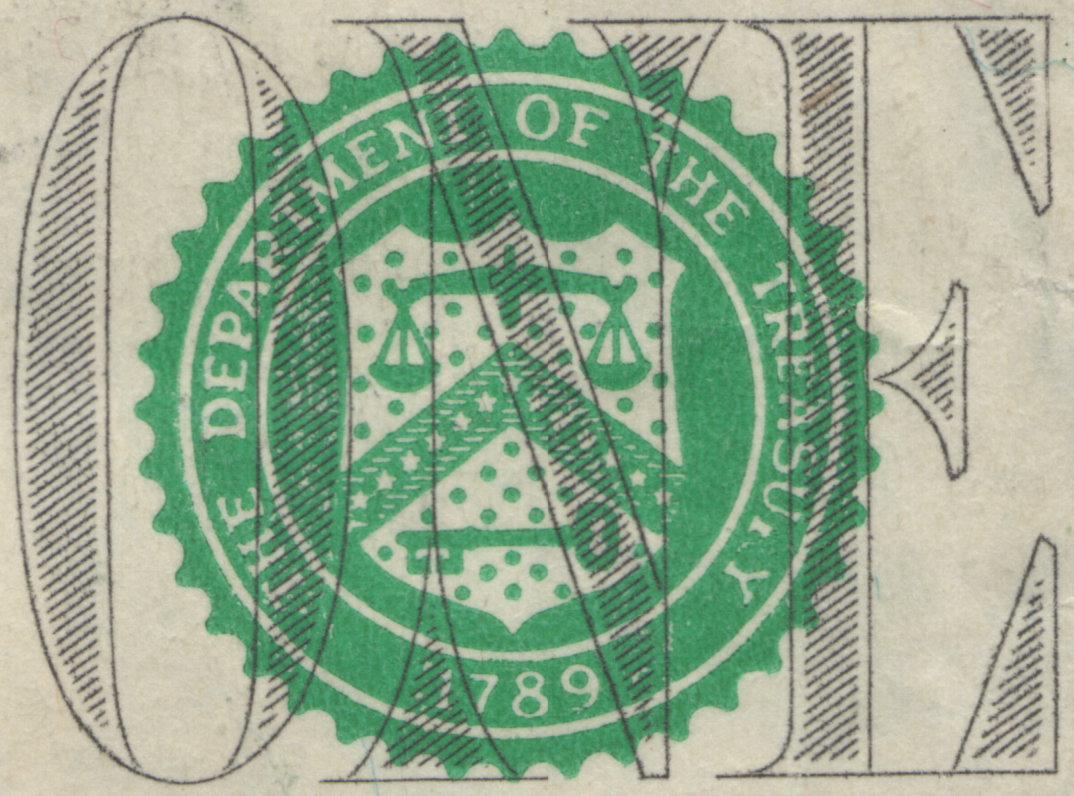
Detail of the Treasury Seal as it appears on a $1 bill

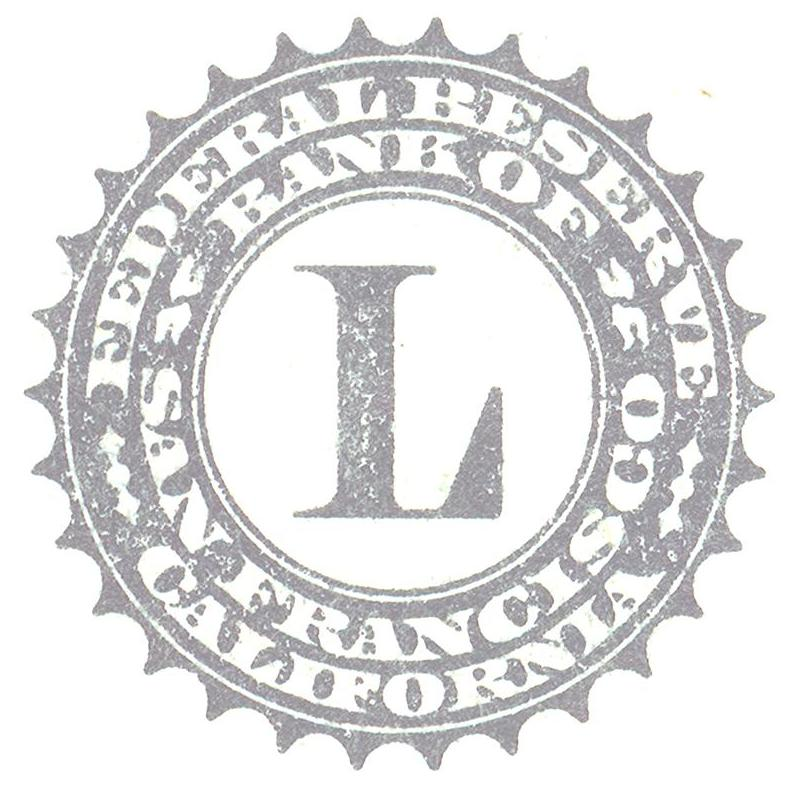
Example Federal Reserve Bank Seal (for San Francisco) as it appears on a $1 bill; the number 12 appears four times to confirm.

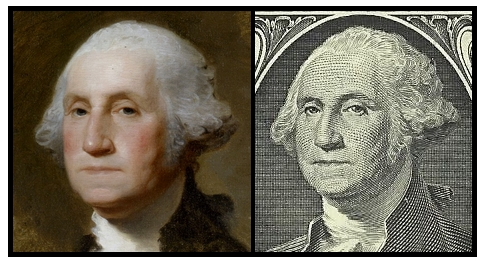
Comparison between Gilbert Stuart's 1796 Athenaeum Portrait and the image on the obverse of the bill. The image from the dollar bill above shows the subject flipped horizontally for ease of comparison.

The portrait of George Washington is displayed in the center of the obverse of the one-dollar bill, as it has been since the 1869 design. The oval containing George Washington is propped up by bunches of bay laurel leaves. George Frederick Cumming Smillie, an engraver at the Bureau of Engraving and Printing, made an etching of the 1796 Athenaeum Portrait by Gilbert Stuart which was used on multiple banknotes. A vignette of the portrait appears on the one dollar bill of 1899, and on notes since 1918.

To the left of George Washington is the Federal Reserve District seal. The name of the Federal Reserve Bank that issued the note encircles a capital letter (A–L), identifying it among the twelve Federal Reserve Banks. The sequential number of the bank (1: A, 2: B, etc.) is also displayed in the four corners of the open space on the bill. Until the redesign of the higher denominations of currency beginning in 1996, this seal was found on all denominations of Federal Reserve notes. Since then it is only present on the $1 and $2 notes, with the higher denominations only displaying a universal Federal Reserve System seal, and the bank letter and number beneath the upper left serial number.

To the right of George Washington is the Treasury Department seal. The scales represent justice. The chevron with thirteen stars represents the original thirteen colonies. The key below the chevron represents authority and trust; 1789 is the year that the Department of the Treasury was established. The series 1969 dollar bills were the first to use a simplified Treasury seal, with the wording in English instead of Latin.

Below the FRB seal (to the left of George Washington) is the signature of the Treasurer of the United States, and below the USDT Seal (right side) is the Secretary of the Treasury's signature. To the left of the Secretary's signature is the series date. A new series date, or addition or change of a sequential letter under a date, results from a change in the Secretary of the Treasury, the Treasurer of the United States, and/or a change to the note's appearance such as a new currency design.

On the edges are olive branches entwined around the 1s. A small plate serial number-letter combination is on the lower right, and a small plate position (check) letter is on the upper left corner of the note. If "FW" appears before the lower right plate number it indicates that the bill was produced at the satellite Bureau of Engraving and Printing facility in Fort Worth, Texas. Currency has been printed here since Series 1988A. The absence of "FW" indicates the bill was printed at the main facility in Washington, D.C.

== Reverse of current $1 bill ==
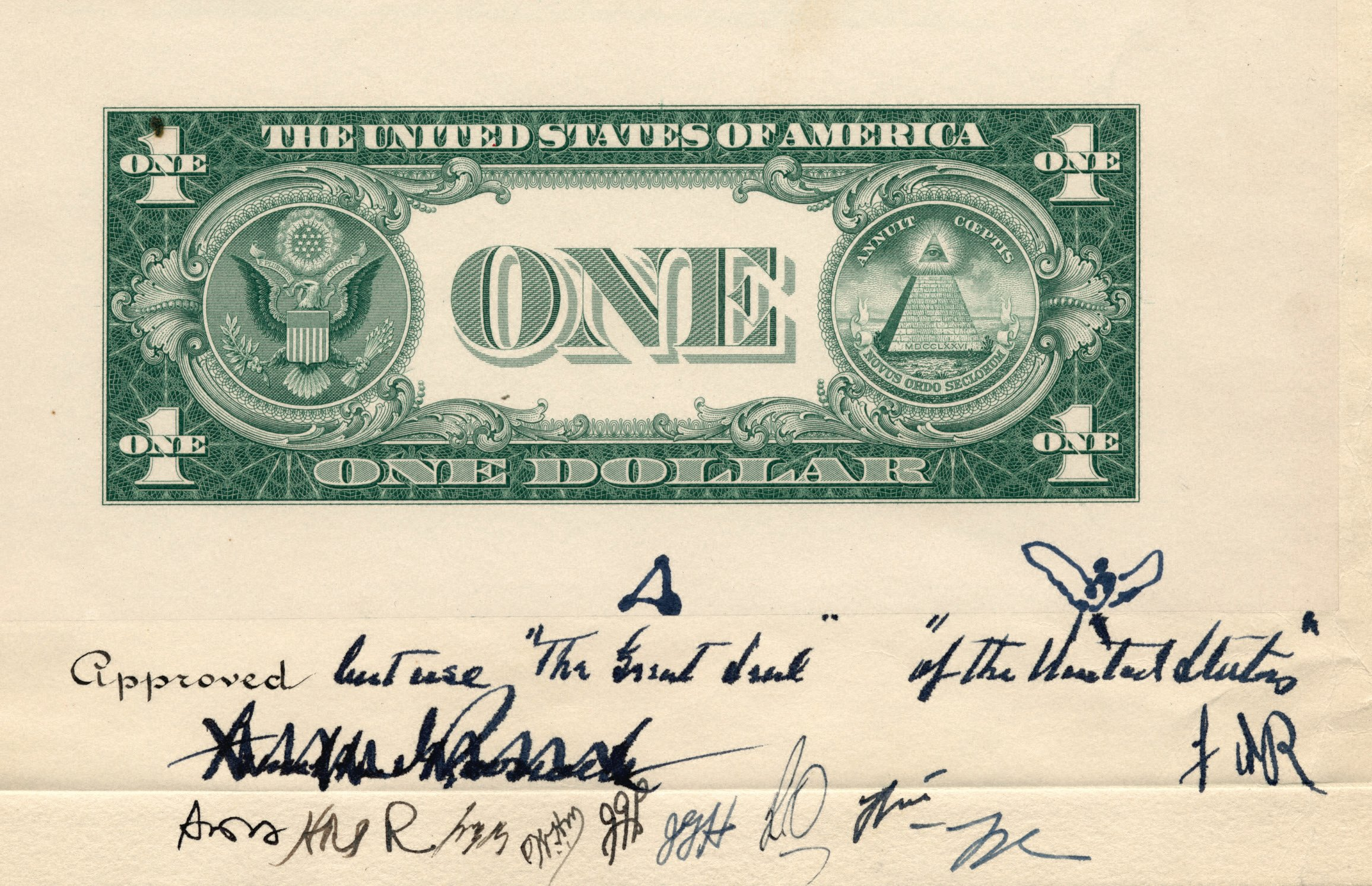
President Franklin Roosevelt's conditional approval of the one-dollar bill's design in 1935, requiring that the appearance of the sides of the Great Seal be reversed, and together, captioned

The reverse of the one-dollar bill has an ornate design that incorporates both sides of the Great Seal of the United States to the left and right of the word "ONE". This word appears prominently in the white space at the center of the bill in a capitalized, shadowed, and seriffed typeface. A smaller image of the word "ONE" is superimposed over the numeral "1" in each of the four corners of the bill.

"THE UNITED STATES OF AMERICA" spans the top of the bill, "ONE DOLLAR" is emblazoned along the bottom, and above the central "ONE" are the words "IN GOD WE TRUST", which became the official motto of the United States in 1956 by an Act of Congress. Below the reverse of the Great Seal on the left side of the bill are the words "THE GREAT SEAL", and below the obverse on the right side are the words "OF THE UNITED STATES."

The Great Seal, originally designed in 1782 and added to the dollar bill's design in 1935, is surrounded by an elaborate floral design. The renderings used were the typical official government versions used since the 1880s.

The reverse of the seal on the left features a barren landscape dominated by an unfinished pyramid of 13 steps, topped by the Eye of Providence within a triangle. At the base of the pyramid are engraved the Roman numerals MDCCLXXVI (1776), the year of American independence from Britain. At the top of the seal stands a Latin phrase, "ANNUIT COEPTIS", meaning "He favors our undertaking." At the bottom of the seal is a semicircular banner proclaiming "NOVUS ORDO SECLORUM" meaning "New Order of the Ages" that is a reference to the new American era. To the left of this seal, a string of 13 pearls extends toward the edge of the bill.

The obverse of the seal on the right features a bald eagle, the national bird and symbol of the United States. Above the eagle is a radiant cluster of 13 stars arranged in a six-pointed star. The eagle's breast is covered by a heraldic shield with 13 stripes that resemble those on the American flag. As on the first US flag, the stars and stripes stand for the 13 original states of the union. The eagle holds a ribbon in its beak reading "E PLURIBUS UNUM", a Latin phrase meaning "Out of many [states], one [nation]", a de facto motto of the United States (and the only one until 1956). Both the phrases "E Pluribus Unum" and "Annuit coeptis" contain 13 letters. In its left talons the eagle holds 13 arrows, and in its right talons it holds an olive branch with 13 leaves and 13 olives, representing, respectively, the powers of war and peace. To the right of this seal, a string of 13 pearls extends toward the edge of the bill. A plate position (check) number is normally found to the left of the eagle.

== Collecting Federal Reserve dollar bills ==
Except for significant errors, and series 1988A web notes printed in small batches for some of the Federal Reserve districts (web notes from other series are more common), green seal dollars are of little collector value. However, two notes have generated public interest, although neither is scarce.

In 1963 dollar bills were produced for the Eleventh Federal Reserve District, headquartered in Dallas. Since the FRD jurisdictions are sequentially numbered, notes received the corresponding letter "K", for the 11th letter of the alphabet. Some people noticed that the 1963 Dallas note, with the number "11" and a "K" surrounded by a black seal, appeared about the time President John F. Kennedy was shot in Dallas in November 1963. The bill was not a commemorative issue and there was no connection between it and the shooting.

In 1968–69 Joseph W. Barr was Secretary of the Treasury for only 31 days and his signature appeared solely on the 1963B dollar bill. Some collectors thought that his brief tenure might make these notes valuable, but use of their plates continued for some time after his term in office and 458,880,000 were printed. Thus, they are very common.

Dollar bills with interesting serial numbers can also be collected. One example of this is radar or “palindrome“ notes, where the numbers in the serial number are the same read from left to right or right to left. Very low serial numbers, or a long block of the same or repeating digits may also be of interest to specialists. Another example is replacement notes, which have a star to the right of the serial number. The star designates that there was a printing error on one or more of the bills, and it has been replaced by one from a run specifically printed and numbered to be replacements. Star notes may have some additional value depending on their condition, their year series or if they have an unusual serial number sequence. To determine the rarity of modern star notes, production tables are maintained. There are rumors that series 2021 notes will be the last year which contains star notes, due to an update in the technology of the printing process.

== Redesign or replacement of the $1 bill ==
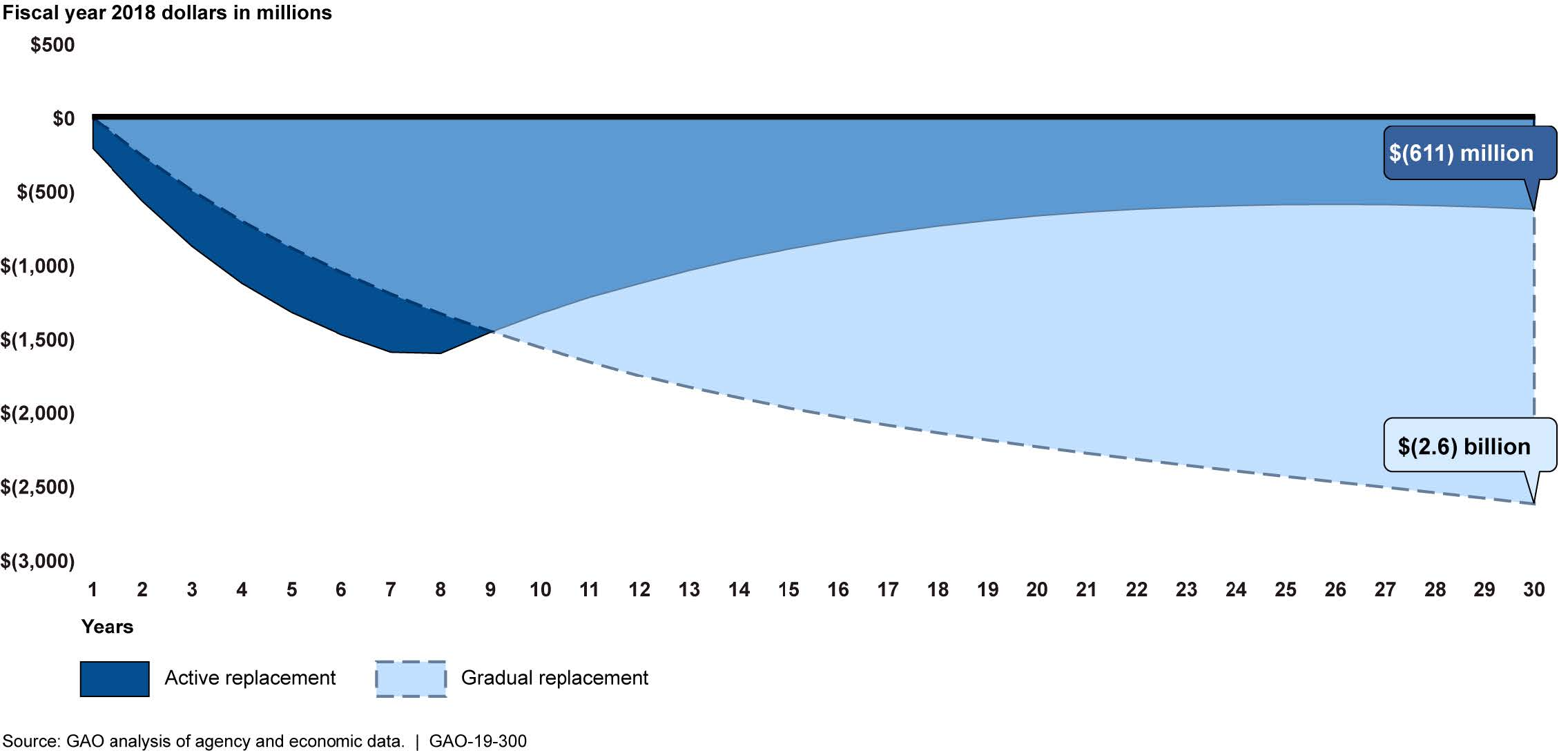
GAO estimated 30-year present-value cost of replacing $1 notes with $1 coins

In modern times, the one-dollar bill is used much more than the dollar coin, despite the U.S. Government's repeated efforts to promote the latter. There are organizations specifically aimed at either preventing (Save the Greenback) or advocating (Coin Coalition) the complete elimination of the one-dollar bill in favor of the dollar coin.

On November 29, 2012, a House subcommittee met to consider replacing the dollar bill. This action took place after the seventh Government Accountability Office report on the subject. The latest report claimed that switching to dollar coins would save $4.4 billion over thirty years. However, according to polls, few Americans want to give up dollar bills.

In response to various requests to redesign the $1 bill to include (among others) the Preamble, Bill of Rights, and list of Articles of the United States Constitution, recent budgets passed by Congress have included provisions to prevent the Treasury Department from spending any of its funds to redesign the $1 bill, since the potential cost impact of this change on the vending machine industry would greatly exceed its benefits.

== See also ==
- Cultural depictions of George Washington
- Greenback (1860s money)
- Sherman Silver Purchase Act
- Where's George?
