= Coin Coalition =

U.S. anti-penny and one dollar bill organization

The Coin Coalition is an organization supporting the elimination of pennies and one dollar bills from U.S. currency. It is funded by vending machine companies, video-arcade owners, and the soft-drink industry, who all have an interest in eliminating maintenance costs associated with bill validators. The National Bulk Vendors Association supports the Coalition.

Manufacturers converted machines to accept the one dollar coin at great expense, but the unwillingness of the U.S. government to phase out the dollar bill has prevented dollar coins from becoming popular. Although copper miners and other interest groups backed the Coin Coalition on this issue, they were unable to match the influence of Save the Greenback, a rival organization supporting continued production of $1 bills.

In 1995, Tom Davis, introducing the Save the Greenback Act, warned that customers' pockets would be weighted down with heavy coins. However, a 1997 article in The Wall Street Journal disputed this notion by noting, "This argument ignores the vast number of quarters now required for parking meters, vending machines, buses and many other staples of life. For a lot of transactions, an attractive $1 coin would be a great convenience. And although we would all be walking around with a few $1 coins, they would be replacing several quarters".

In advocating abolition of the penny, the Coin Coalition cites three penny-related costs that are passed on to consumers:

- Wrapping charges (stores pay about 60 cents for each roll of 50 pennies)
- Lost store productivity from penny users slowing the checkout line
- Lost wages paid to clerks counting pennies in the register on each shift

James C. Benfield, a partner with Bracy Williams and Company (Washington, D.C.), led the Coalition from 1987 until his death in 2002. He testified in committee hearings on the United States $1 Coin Act of 1997.

== See also ==
- Penny debate in the United States
