= Save the Greenback =

US government employee lobbying organization

Save the Greenback is an organization of U.S. Bureau of Engraving and Printing employees and paper and ink suppliers opposed to phasing out the paper dollar. The group formed to counter the influence of the Coin Coalition. Their website was inactive as of July 2012.

Public opinion has tended to favor the dollar bill, although in 2000, the Government Accountability Office reported that a full implementation of the dollar coin could save $500 million a year.

== Americans for George ==
There was an online organization calling itself Americans for George. It was a public-relations campaign appearing to be a grassroots organization (an "Astroturf group"). Their website was also inactive as of July 2012.

== Portrayal in media ==
In 2006 and 2007, auto manufacturer Kia Motors used this name in a car discount campaign. In the TV campaigns, the group was portrayed as a group similar to Greenpeace, with a mission to save money.

== See also ==
- Save the Greenback Act
