= Hawaii overprint note =

Modified US bank note used in Hawaii during World War II

- Country: United States
- Value: $1, $5, $10, $20
- Years of printing: 1942–1944
- Nature of rarity: Emergency Issue
- Estimated value: US$2 – $1,300

Obverse
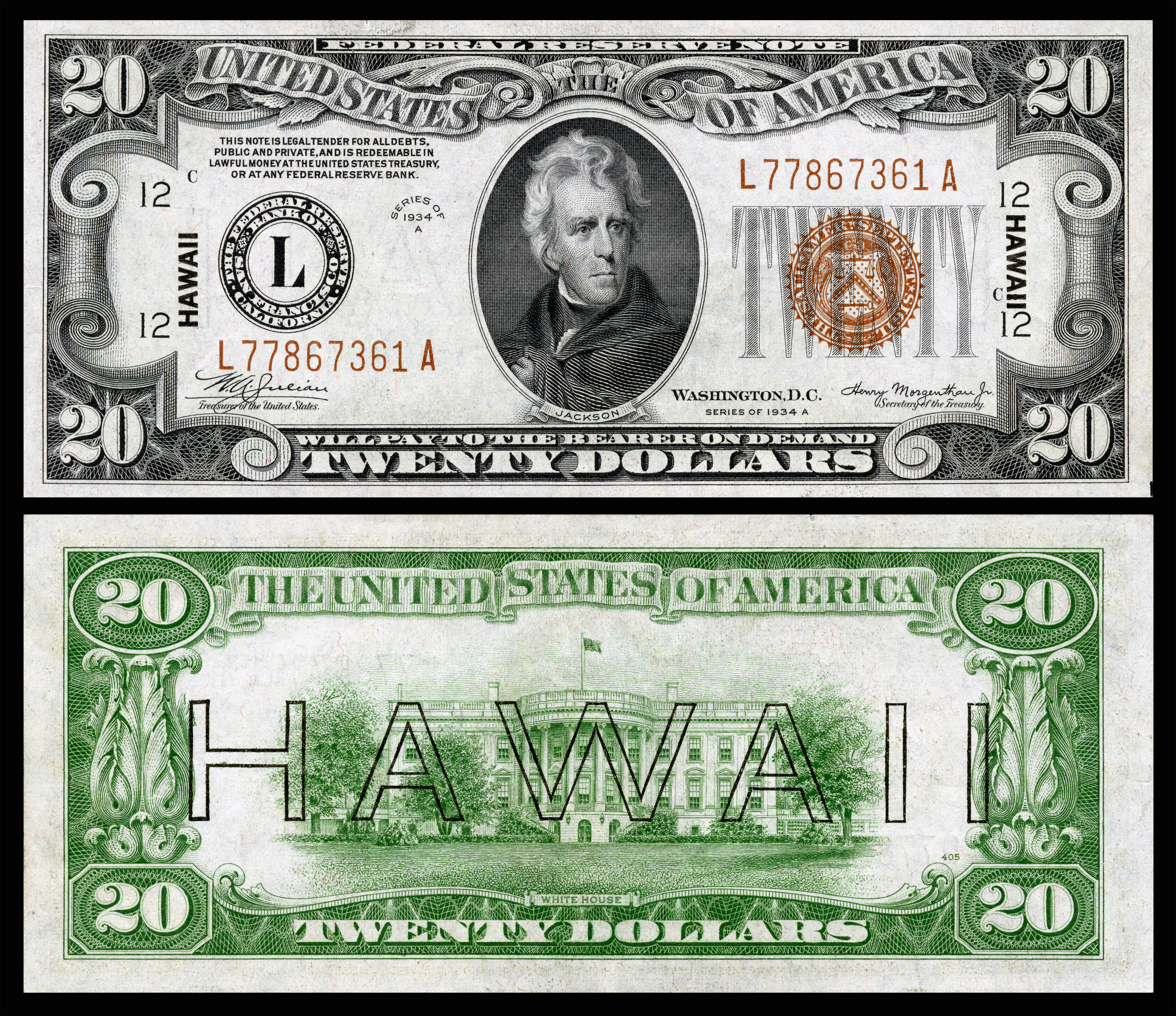

A Hawaii overprint note is one of a series of banknotes (one silver certificate and three Federal Reserve Notes) issued during World War II as an emergency issue after the attack on Pearl Harbor. The intent of the overprints was to easily distinguish United States dollars captured by the Imperial Japanese Armed Forces in the event of an invasion of Hawaii and render the notes worthless. Although a sizeable number of the notes were recalled and destroyed after the end of World War II, many escaped destruction and exist as collectibles of numismatic interest in the present day.

== Issue ==
After the attack on Pearl Harbor on December 7, 1941, by the Empire of Japan, U.S. military officials surmised that in the event of an invasion of Hawaii, the Imperial Japanese Armed Forces would have access to a considerable amount of United States dollars which could be seized from financial institutions or private individuals. Faced with this scenario, on January 10, 1942, Military Governor Delos Carleton Emmons issued an order to recall all dollars in circulation in Hawaii, save for set caps on how much money both individuals ($200) and businesses ($500; save extra currency for payroll purposes) could possess at any time.

On June 25, 1942, new overprinted notes were first issued. Series 1935A $1 silver certificate, Series 1934 $5 and $20 Federal Reserve Notes, and Series 1934A $5, $10, and $20 Federal Reserve Notes from the Federal Reserve Bank of San Francisco were issued with brown treasury seals and serial numbers. Overprints of the word HAWAII were made; two small overprints to the sides of the obverse of the note between the border and both the treasury seal and Federal Reserve Bank of San Francisco seal, and large outlined HAWAII lettering dominating the reverse. The purpose was that should there have been an Imperial Japanese invasion of the islands, the US government could immediately declare any Hawaii-printed notes worthless, due to their easy identification. With this issue, military officials prohibited the use of non-overprinted notes and ordered all Hawaii residents to turn in regular notes for Hawaii-overprinted notes by July 15, 1942. Beginning on August 15, 1942, no other paper U.S. currency could be used except under special permission.

Hawaii overprint notes
Image	Value	Dimensions	Main Color	Description			Date of			Catalog #
Obverse/Reverse	Value	Dimensions	Main Color	Obverse	Reverse	Watermark	printing	issue	withdrawal	Catalog #
	$1 silver certificate	6.140 in × 2.610 in (155.956 mm × 66.294 mm)	Green; Black	George Washington	Great Seal of the United States	None		June 25, 1942	April, 1946	Friedberg F-2300; Friedberg F-2300*
	$5 Federal Reserve Note	6.140 in × 2.610 in (155.956 mm × 66.294 mm)	Green; Black	Abraham Lincoln	Lincoln Memorial	None		June 25, 1942	April, 1946	Friedberg F-2301; Friedberg F-2301*; Friedberg F-2302; Friedberg F-2302*
	$10 Federal Reserve Note	6.140 in × 2.610 in (155.956 mm × 66.294 mm)	Green; Black	Alexander Hamilton	US Treasury Building	None		June 25, 1942	April, 1946	Friedberg F-2303; Friedberg F-2303*
	$20 Federal Reserve Note	6.140 in × 2.610 in (155.956 mm × 66.294 mm)	Green; Black	Andrew Jackson	White House	None		June 25, 1942	April, 1946	Friedberg F-2304; Friedberg F-2304*; Friedberg F-2305; Friedberg F-2305*

== Use ==
The notes and issuance continued in use until October 21, 1944; by April 1946, notes were being recalled, but many were not destroyed and are still legal tender at their face value, though their numismatic value is considerably higher. Many notes were saved as curios and souvenirs by servicemen.

== Destruction of recalled notes ==
Faced with a $200 million stockpile of US currency, military officials opted to destroy all the recalled regular currency instead of overcoming the logistical problems of shipping the notes back to the mainland. At first, a local crematorium (Note: Simpson notes Oahu Cemetery as the first burn site; however, Medcalf notes Nuuanu Mortuary as the first burn site when interviewed by the Honolulu Advertiser.) was pressed into service to burn the notes. To ensure complete destruction, a fine mesh was placed on the top of the chimneys to catch and recirculate unburnt scraps of currency escaping the fire.

Destruction of the notes was slow, and pressed with time, the bigger furnaces of the ʻAiea sugar mill were requisitioned to help burn the currency.

== As a collectible ==
Of the series, the $5 note is considered the most desirable, as a little over 9 million examples were printed. Over 35 million $1 notes were made, making them the most common of the series. Star notes exist for all the notes, and command a sizable premium.

Denomination	Quantity printed	Star note quantity printed	References
$1	35,052,000	204,000	
$5	9,416,000	?	
$10	10,424,000	?	
$20	11,246,000	54,500	
