= Funnyback =

United States one-dollar silver certificate

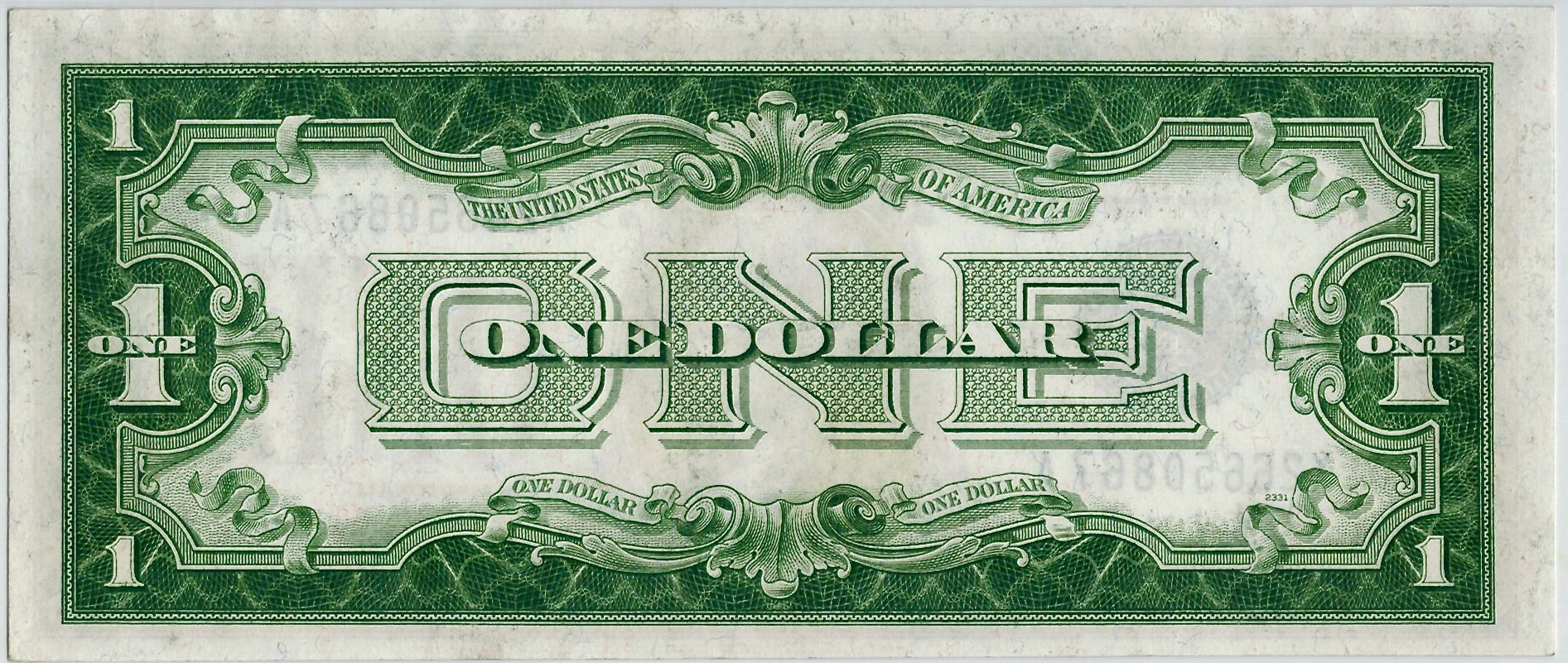
1928 small-sized United States silver certificate "Funnyback" reverse

A Funnyback is a type of one-dollar silver certificate produced in 1928 and 1934 in the United States. People referred to the note as a "Funnyback" based on the significantly lighter green ink and unusual font printed on the reverse.

The note marked the introduction of small-size banknotes in the United States. The small-size Funnyback dollar measured 6.14 by 2.61 in (156 by 66 mm). Prior to 1928, United States currency was of the large-note variety; measuring 7.375 by 3.125 in (187.3 by 79.4 mm), they were referred as "Horse Blankets".

== Description ==
The reverse had no symbolism nor mention of the government, and collectors dubbed the currency "Funnyback". (Compare the earlier currency nicknames of greenback and greenback.) It measured 6.14 by 2.61 in (156 by 66 mm), and featured a blue Treasury seal on the obverse. The obverse carries the portrait of the first American president, George Washington. Serial numbers are found to the left and right of the portrait. Also, on the obverse, the 1928 or 1934 series is found. The signatures of the Treasurer of the United States and the United States Secretary of the Treasury appear in the lower fields on the obverse. Under the portrait of George Washington, a note states that the paper is redeemable for "one silver dollar". People called the note the Funnyback based on the dramatically lighter green ink used on the reverse and the unusually large font used for the word "ONE" in the center of the design.

== History ==
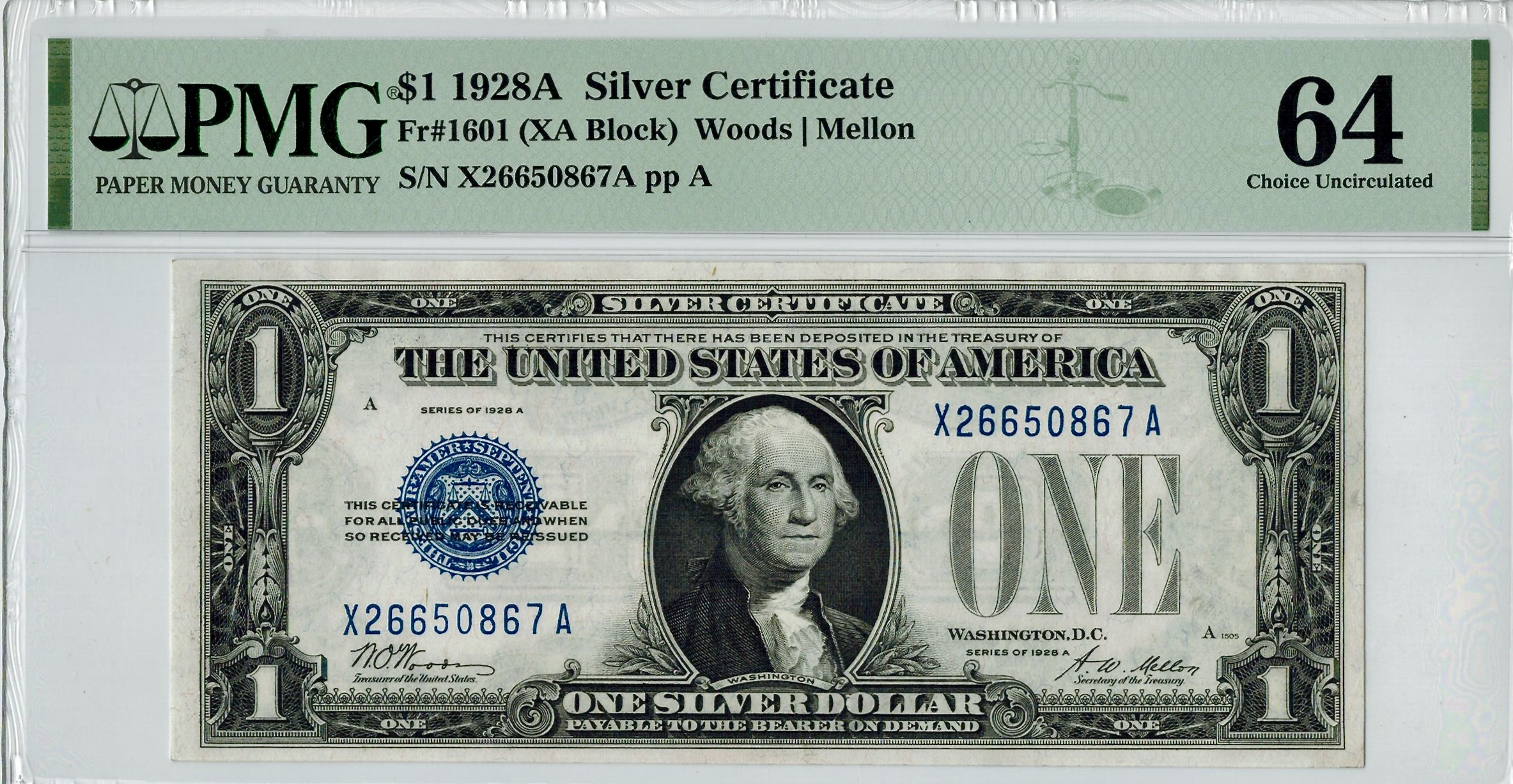
1928 blue seal XA block "Funnyback" obverse

Planning and designing for the new small-size note was completed by October 1927. The purpose of the redesign was to make money harder to counterfeit and make the bills smaller so they would be easier to handle. Released in 1928, the note was the first U.S. small note, introduced to mirror other contemporary treasury paper money.

Initially, some people refused to accept the new smaller notes because they were unsure they were real money. Before the introduction of the Funnyback, United States currency was of the large-note "horse blanket" variety. This large-size format had been used for all prior silver certificates issued under the Bland–Allison Act, and was also adopted for the first Federal Reserve Notes issued under the Federal Reserve Act of 1913. The Funnyback was nearly 30% smaller than its predecessors, and featured a new typeface. The Bureau of Engraving and Printing (BEP) said the size reduction was to reduce manufacturing costs, as the smaller notes allowed the BEP to print 12 notes per sheet instead of only 8 large-size notes. The BEP was also concerned that there were too many different currencies in circulation, and they hoped to standardize each denomination.

The dollar was issued with a red seal or a blue seal. In July 1929, the BEP issued less than two million Funnybacks of the red-seal variety. The blue-seal variety was issued after July 1929. The Funnyback was issued from 1928 until 1935.

Some Funnybacks have serial numbers that begin with x, y or z, and all were in the B-block printing. The x, y or z indicates experimental paper; the BEP was experimenting with different combinations of linen, cotton and paper. The first of the experimental notes were printed in 1932 for 1933 circulation. The 1928 red-seal Funnybacks were signed by W. O. Woods and W. H. Woodin and were printed in April and May 1933. There were 1,864,000 red-seal Funnybacks released in Puerto Rico in 1948 and 1949 in response to the Recession of 1949. In total, the BEP printed more than 640 million Funnybacks.

In 2021, one blue-seal example of a Funnyback sold for US$7,593.75. The example had a serial number featuring all fives (U55555555A).

== Reception ==
When the note began circulating, Louis A. Hill, a former director of the BEP, said the bill was "the poorest, confessedly the cheapest, and without doubt, the most dangerous issue of United States currency in history". In 1930, George H. Blake said the currency " ... has had some severe criticism, as well as commendation. Only the future can tell whether this radical change in our paper money will be a success."
