= Symbols of the United States Department of the Treasury =

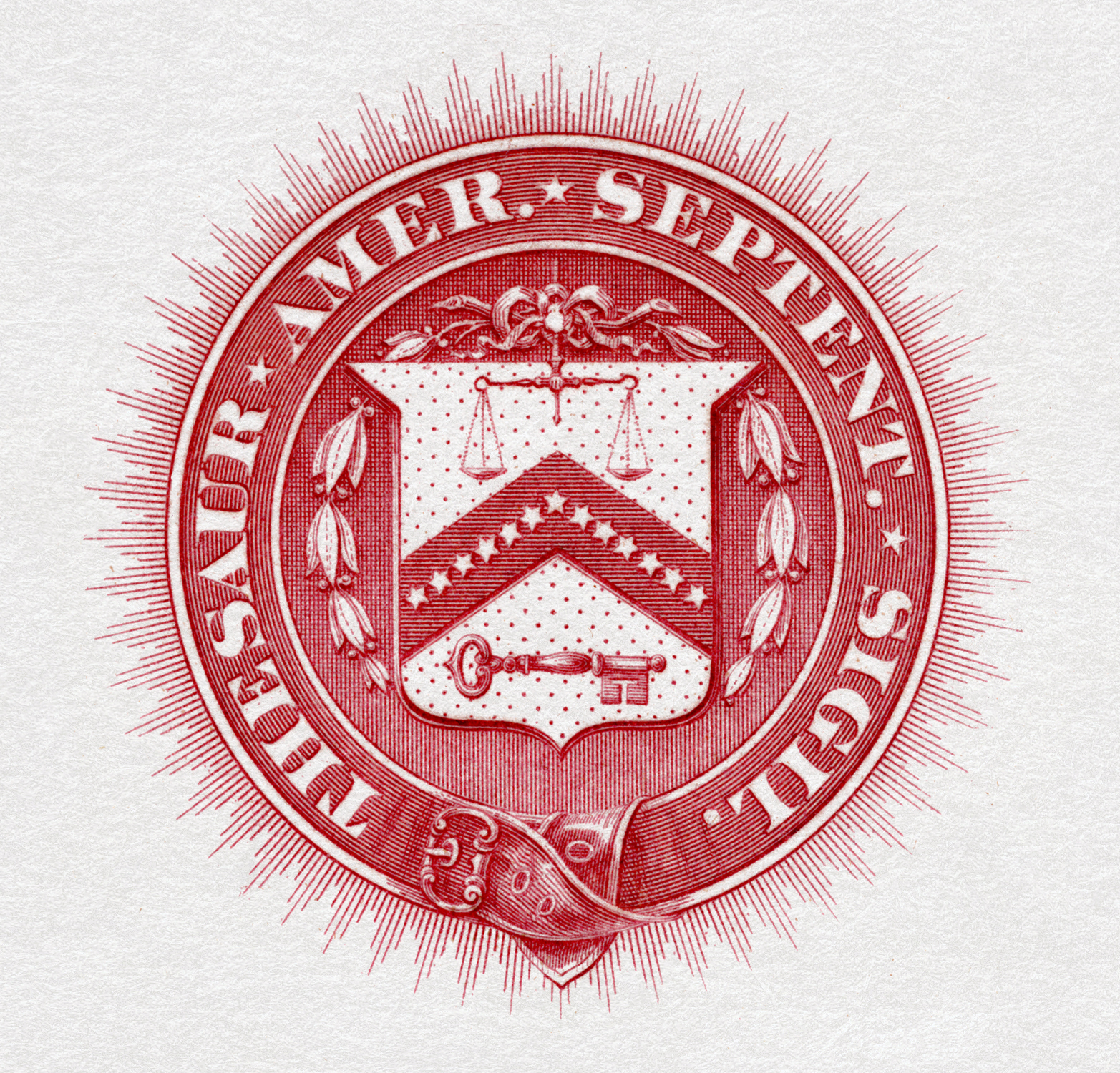
Bureau of Engraving and Printing proof impression of a United States Treasury seal used for issued currency. This particular design, with the distinctive belt buckle, was only used on Series 1878 U.S. Silver Certificates.

Symbols of the United States Department of the Treasury include the Flag of the Treasury Department and the U.S. Treasury Seal. The original seal predates the department, having originated with the Board of Treasury during the period of the Articles of Confederation. The seal is used on all U.S. paper currency, and—like other departmental seals—on official Treasury documents.

The seal includes a chevron with thirteen stars, representing the original thirteen states. Above the chevron is a balance, representing justice. The key below the chevron represents authority and trust.

The phrase "The Department of the Treasury" is around the rim, and 1789 (the year the department was established) is at the bottom. This inscription is in a Cheltanham Bold font.

== Seal ==
Seal of the Department of the Treasury
- Armiger: U.S. Department of the Treasury
- Adopted: January 29, 1968
- Torse: THE DEPARTMENT OF THE TREASURY - 1789
- Shield: Chevron with thirteen stars, a balance, and a key.
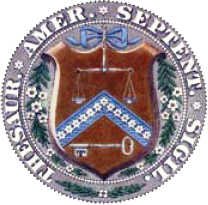
- Earlier version
- Use: To represent the organization and to authenticate currency and certain documents.

=== History ===
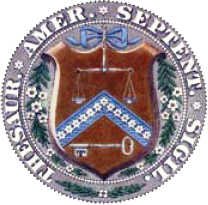
Original seal, dating from before 1968

In 1778, the Second Continental Congress named John Witherspoon, Gouverneur Morris and Richard Henry Lee to design seals for the Treasury and the Navy. The committee reported on a design for the Navy the following year, but there is no record of a report about a seal for the Treasury.

The actual creator of the U.S. Treasury seal was Francis Hopkinson, who was one of the signers of the Declaration of Independence and also contributed to the design of the Great Seal of the United States. He is known to have later submitted bills to the Congress in 1780 seeking payment for his design of flags, currency, and several seals, including one for the Board of Treasury. The earliest known usage of the seal was in 1782. When the United States Government was established in 1789, the new Department of the Treasury continued to use the existing seal.

In addition to the elements still found on the current seal, the original featured more ornamentation and the Latin inscription THESAUR. AMER. SEPTENT. SIGIL. around the rim. The inscription is an abbreviation for the phrase Thesauri Americae Septentrionalis Sigillum, which translates to "The Seal of the Treasury of North America". The reason for the original wording that embraced all of North America is unknown, although the first national bank—chartered in 1781 to help solidify the nation's finances—was named the Bank of North America.

After nearly 200 years, Treasury Secretary Henry H. Fowler approved a new, simplified version of the seal on January 29, 1968. The Latin inscription was replaced by the English THE DEPARTMENT OF THE TREASURY, and 1789 was added at the bottom.

=== Currency ===
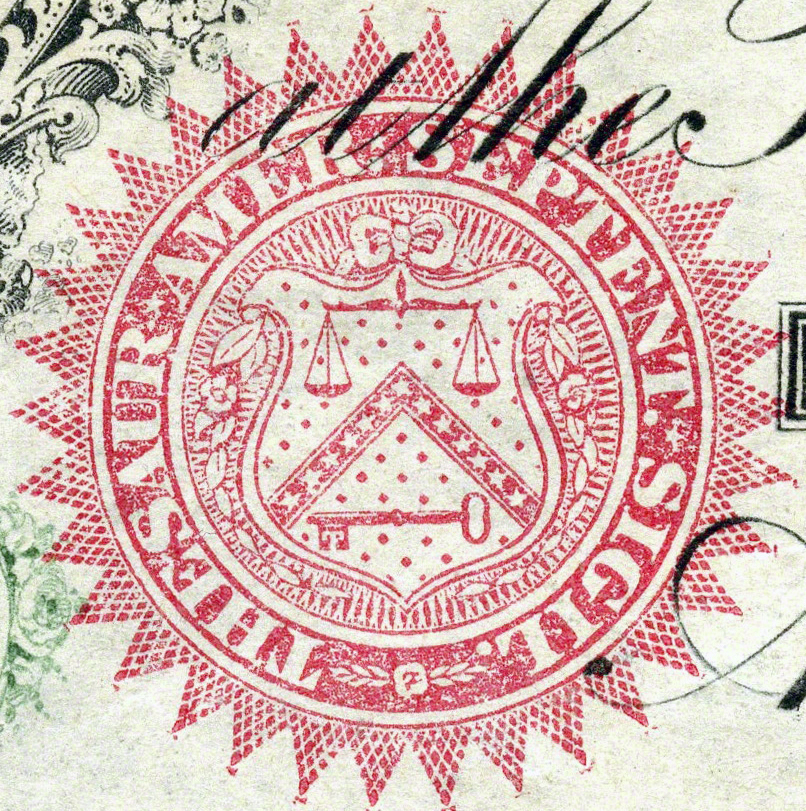
Seal on the first $1 paper bill from 1862

The Treasury seal has been printed on virtually all U.S. federally-issued paper currency, starting with the Legal Tender Notes (United States Notes) in 1862 and continuing today. The only exceptions were the Demand Notes of 1861 (the original "greenbacks") and the first three issues of fractional (less than a dollar) notes in the 1860s; in both cases the authorizing laws did not require the seal.

Initially the U.S. government had no means to produce bills on its own, so the first paper bills were printed by private firms and then sent to the Treasury Department for final processing. Along with trimming and separating the bills, this processing included the overprinting of the seal onto the notes (even today, the serial number and seal are overprinted on the notes after the face has been printed). This was the beginning of what was later known as the Bureau of Engraving and Printing. In July 1869, the Bureau began to print notes on its own.

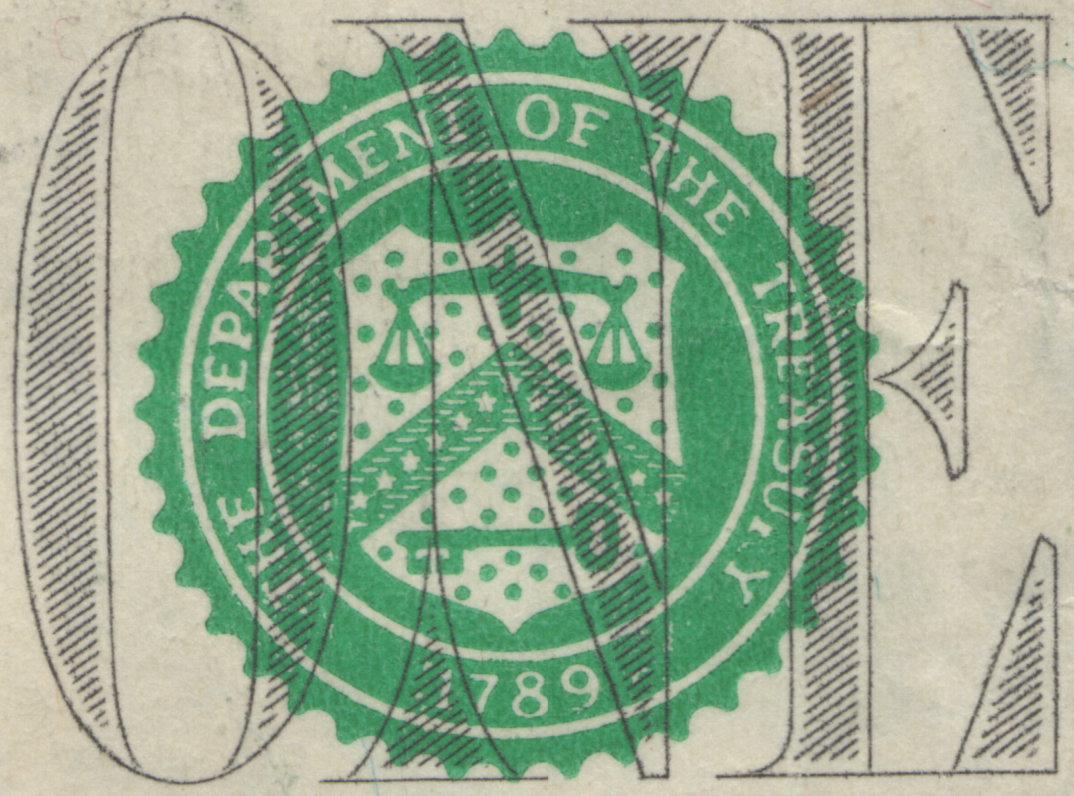
Modern seal on a current $1 bill

For several decades, the color and style of the printed seal varied greatly from issue to issue (and even within the same issue). The basic seal was the same, but the circumferences were embellished with lathework decoration such as scallops, beading, or spikes. Among the colors used for the seal during this period were red, blue, and brown.

The usage of the seal was standardized starting on the smaller-sized notes of Series 1928. The seal was printed with a toothed outer edge, and other than the color were the same across all styles of currency. Federal Reserve Notes were issued with a green seal, silver certificates with a blue seal, gold certificates with an orange seal, United States Notes with a red seal, and National Bank Notes and Federal Reserve Bank Notes with brown seals.

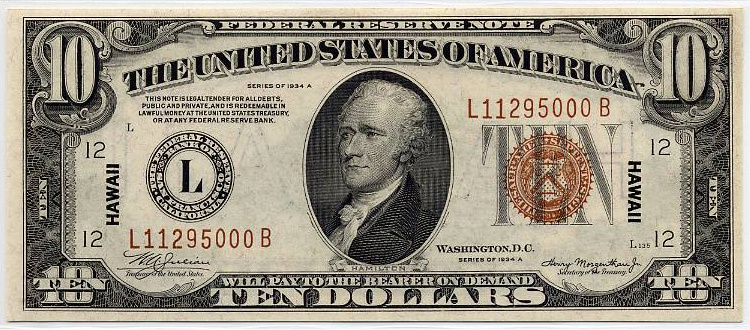
$10 Hawaii overprint bill

During World War II, special versions of Federal Reserve Notes and Silver Certificates were printed with the word HAWAII on each end, and circulated only in Hawaii between 1942 and 1944. The seal and serial numbers were brown to further distinguish them from regular notes. In the event that Hawaii was captured by enemy forces, the special notes could be declared worthless. Similarly, special Silver Certificates were issued for use by U.S. troops during the invasion of North Africa in November 1942. These notes had a distinctive yellow treasury seal, which would again allow them to be declared worthless if large amounts fell into enemy hands.

In Series 1950, the general design of all Federal Reserve Notes was changed slightly, and a smaller seal was used. The 1968 version of the Treasury Seal had first been used on the $100 United States Note in Series 1966, and was later introduced on all Federal Reserve Notes starting with Series 1969.

=== Watchdog seal ===
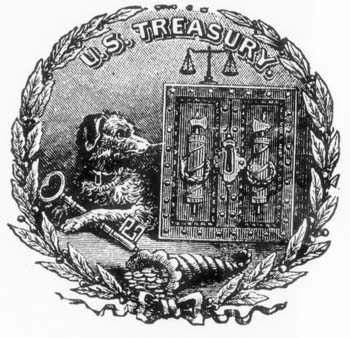
Watchdog seal

The watchdog seal dates from around 1800. Its origin is a matter of speculation, as is the extent of its use at the time. It has long disappeared from Treasury documents, but the original plate of the seal is on deposit at the United States Government Printing Office.

The seal contains a symbolic strongbox, with the Scales of Justice on top. Lying beside the strongbox is a capable looking watchdog, with his left front paw securely clasping a large key. The seal bears the lettering "U.S. Treasury", and is bordered by a wreath. The scales and the key are also incorporated on the official seal.

The United States Mint did in fact own a real watchdog named Nero, who was originally purchased in 1793 for $3 and accompanied the night watchman on his rounds. Treasury documents record further expenditures for Nero and successor watchdogs over the following twenty-five years, and currently Sherman. According to department legend, Nero is the canine depicted on the seal, and may have been the origin (or at least the inspiration) of the term "Watchdog of the Treasury".

== Flag ==
United States Department of the Treasury
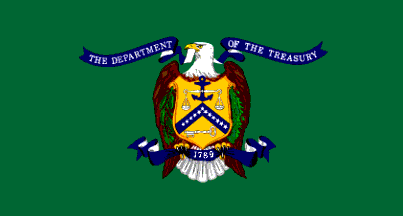
- Adopted: January 11, 1963
- Design: Background of mintleaf green with an eagle, holding a scroll emblazoned with "THE DEPARTMENT OF THE TREASURY" in its beak, while resting on a shield. In the eagle's claws is another scroll, emblazoned with "1789".

The Flag of the Treasury Department was approved on January 11, 1963, by C. Douglas Dillon, the 57th Secretary of the Treasury, and was first displayed on July 1, 1963. According to the U.S. Department of the Treasury, the flag is defined as follows:

The Treasury Flag has a background of mintleaf green, upon which there is a shield resting upon an eagle. In its beak, the eagle is holding a scroll containing the words "The Department of the Treasury." The obverse side of the scroll is Old Glory blue with white letters and the reverse side is white with dark gray. In its claws the eagle holds another scroll containing the year of the Department's creation "1789" in white.

The shield background is yellow with brown outlines and yellow-orange shadows. There is an oak branch on the right side and an olive branch on the left. It also contains a blue chevron crested by 13 white stars (to represent the original thirteen states). Beneath the chevron is the traditional Treasury key (the emblem of official authority) in white. Above the chevron appears the balancing scales (representing justice) in white pivoting upon a blue anchor.

— U.S. Department of the Treasury, "Flag of the Treasury Department",

=== Treasury Department officials ===
In addition to the departmental flag, several personal flags, or standards, are used to represent different U.S. Treasury Department officials, such as the U.S. Secretary of the Treasury.

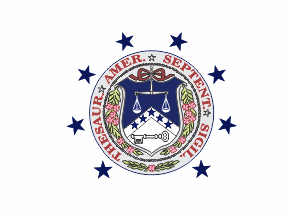
The former flag of the U.S. Secretary of the Treasury, originating from 1887. It was used until 1915.

The current flag of the U.S. Secretary of the Treasury

The flag of the U.S. Deputy Secretary of the Treasury

The flag of a U.S. Assistant Secretary of the Treasury

The flag of a U.S. Under Secretary of the Treasury
