= Glossary of notaphily =

List of terms in study of paper currency

This page is a glossary of notaphily. Notaphily is the study of paper money or banknotes.

== Terms ==
Back
Preferred term for the reverse side of a note.
Back plate number (U.S.A.)
Small number found on the lower right side of the back of a bill. Officially known as a Check Number, it provides a cross-reference to the Plate Serial Number on the front.
Banknote
Paper currency issued by a bank as opposed to a government.
BEP (U.S.A.)
The Bureau of Engraving and Printing (United States).
Border
Outer edge of the design on the back and front where the design ends and plain currency paper begins.
Brick (U.S.A.)
Unit of measurement used by the BEP. A strap is 100 notes banded together, forty straps make a brick. Consists of 4000 notes weighing about 4 kilograms or 8.8 pounds.
Broken bank note
Currency issued by a now defunct bank. Also referred to as obsolete banknote.
Changeover notes
A run of notes with a change in signatures, series, or varieties without an interruption in the serial numbering. Occasionally, duplicate serial numbers can occur.
Check number
Small number found on the lower right of a note, used to cross reference plate numbers.
Condition
Grade or state of preservation of paper currency.
Continental currency (U.S.A.)
Paper money first issued in 1775 by the Continental Congress, originally backed by Spanish milled dollars.
Counterfeit
Currency specifically created to look like genuine currency with the intent to defraud.
Currency
Legal tender referring usually to paper money, but can be applied to coins and notes.
Decimalization
A process of changing the ratio between the main and the subunit of a currency to an integral power of 10. This is not to be confused with Redenomination.
Denomination
Face value or amount a coin or note is worth.
District Number (U.S.A.)
The Federal Reserve District Number appears four times on the face of a bill for identification purposes.
Engraving
Labor intensive process where the design of a bill is engraved onto a steel printing plate.
Error note
Piece of currency that has a manufacturing mistake or misprint.
Face
Preferred term for the front side of paper currency.
Federal Reserve District Seal (U.S.A.)
Found to the left of the portrait on United States currency, it identifies the Federal Reserve Bank that issued the note.
Federal Reserve Bank Note (U.S.A.)
Series of U.S. paper money once authorized by the Federal Reserve, now obsolete. The bank that issued the note was obliged not the Federal Reserve System.
Federal Reserve Note (U.S.A.)
The only form of money now being printed by the United States.
Gold certificate (U.S.A.)
Form of U.S. paper money redeemable for gold coin at one time.
Grade
Condition or state of preservation of a piece of paper money.
Greenback (U.S.A.)
Issued in 1861 as a Demand Note. Green Ink used as an anti-counterfeiting measure. Today, almost all US currency is termed "Greenback".
Horse blanket (U.S.A.)
Popular term for large size U.S. notes. See History of the United States dollar.
Imprint
Name of printer on the note.
Large size (U.S.A.)
Refers to U.S. paper money that measures 7 3/8 x 3 1/8 inches, issued from 1861 to 1928. See History of the United States dollar.
Microprinting
Anti-counterfeiting measure where printing within certain areas can be as small as six thousandths of an inch.
Obverse
Front side of paper money, preferred term being face.
Prefix
Letter/s over number with numbers following in serial number.
Press
High speed machinery on which paper money is printed.
Printing plate
Sheet of steel onto which the note design has been engraved.
Radar note
A banknote in which the serial number reads the same backwards as forwards.
Redenomination
The replacement of old currency for newer currency, this usually involves the taking off of some zeroes as years of inflation have reduced the value of the currency. As one example, in 1993 one thousand Mexican pesos were replaced by one Nuevo peso.
Remainder banknote
A banknote that has been prepared for issue, but not issued for one reason or another, such as the failure of the banknote issuer, or the merging of one banknote issuer into another.
Replacement banknote
A note printed with a special symbol before the serial number, or with a special serial number prefix, used to replace notes damaged during the manufacturing process. US replacement notes are called Star Notes because a five pointed star is positioned at the beginning or end of the serial number. Older Canadian replacement notes are known as asterisk notes because an asterisk preceded the serial number. Modern Canadian replacement notes use a special serial number prefix. Italy reserved the letter X as the first letter of the serial number in replacement notes before adopting the euro. Other countries may use different methods.
Reverse
Back side of paper money, preferred term being back.
Reserve Bank
Central bank of some countries.
Security thread
Anti-counterfeiting measure of a polymer strip embedded into the currency paper. Usually visible when held to bright light and glows red when held to ultraviolet.
Series
Set of years banknote was printed with a specific design and denomination. See also series (United States currency).
Serial number
Identifying number on a note, used to track production and anti-counterfeiting. Serial numbers on US notes are on the face, but other countries' notes can have them on the back or on both sides.
Series date
Notes are dated when they were authorized or first issued. Notes carry that same date throughout their lifespan.
Silver certificate
Certificate of ownership that silver owners hold instead of storing the actual silver.
Small size (U.S.A.)
Refers to modern U.S. paper currency that measures 6 1/8 x 2 5/8 inches, first issued in 1929.
Star note
See replacement note above.
Suffix
Letters that appear after serial numbers (123456ADE).
Syngraphics
Word coined in 1974 to denote the study and collecting of paper money. Based on the Latin word syngrapha, meaning a written promise to pay.
Treasury Note (U.S.A.)
Also known as a coin note, they were first issued in 1890 and redeemable for gold and silver coins.
Uniface
Banknote with printing on one side only.
Vignette
Picture on a note that fades into the background rather than being framed by a border.
Watermark
Embedded anti-counterfeiting design created by varying the density and thickness of the paper. Can be seen when held up to light.
