= Notaphily =

Study and collection of paper currency

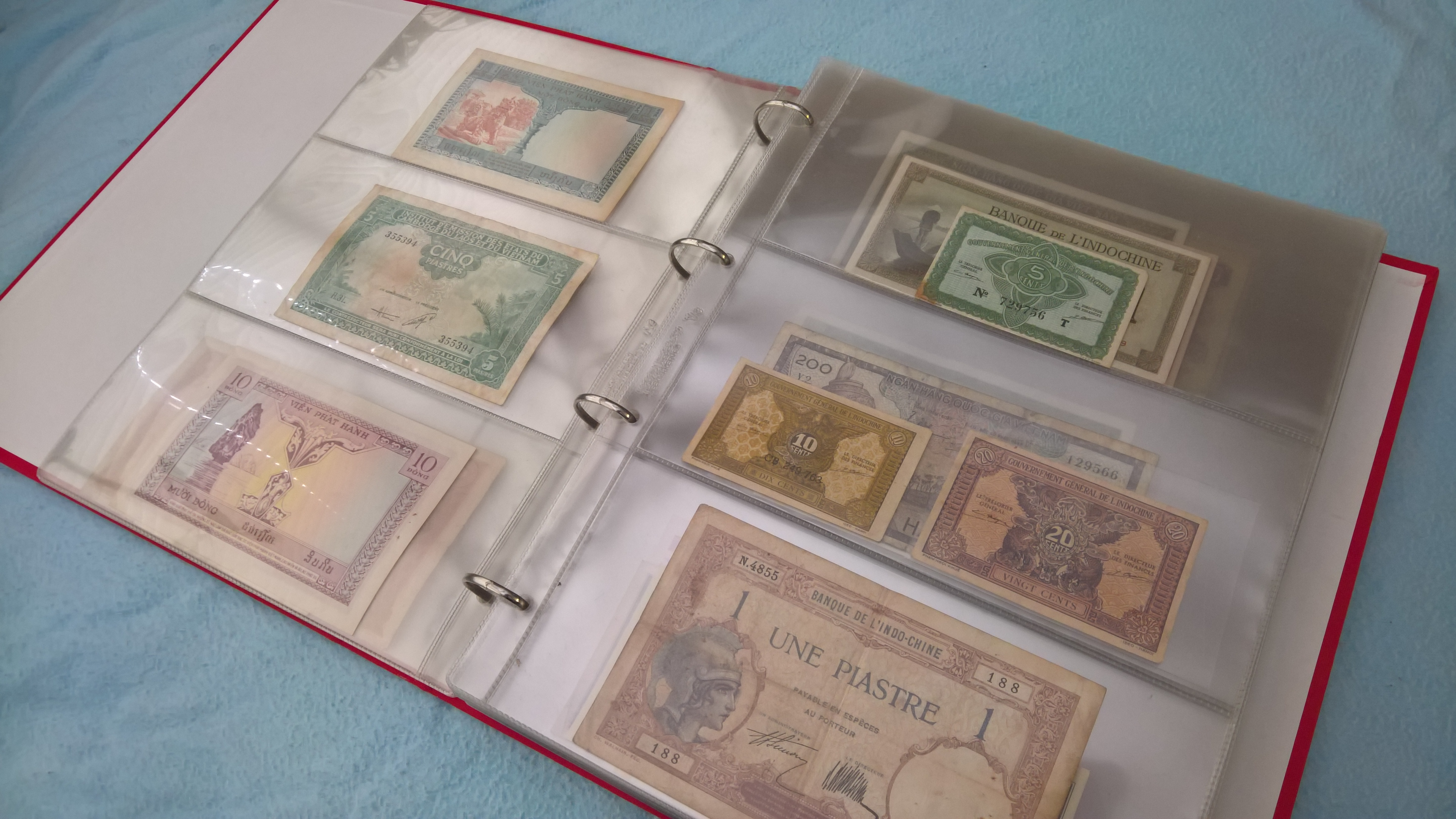
Notaphily banknotes

Notaphily (/noʊˈtæfɪli/) is the study and collection of paper currency or banknotes. A notaphilist is a collector of banknotes or paper money, particularly as a hobby.

== History ==
It is widely believed that people have been collecting paper money for as long as it has been in use. Notable early collectors include Maberly Phillips (1838–1923), Henry Strakosch (1871–1943), Fred Catling (1873–1947), Arnold Keller (1897–1972) and Albert Pick (1922–2015). While people began collecting paper currency more systematically in the 1940s, the turning point occurred in the 1970s when notaphily was established as a separate area by collectors.

The term was coined in 1970 by Robert Stanley, a linguist then employed as Public Relations Manager of the collectors and investments firm Stanley Gibbons, in a successful attempt to formalise and encourage interest in the area. The term philanoty had been considered, but notaphily was preferred because of its assonance with the familiar philately.

At the same time, some developed countries such as the United States, Germany and France began publishing their respective national catalogues of paper money, which represented major points of reference literature.

In 1961, The International Bank Note Society, (IBNS), was formed as an international association of banknote collectors. Nowadays it has thousands of members from around the world. The IBNS publishes the quarterly IBNS Journal, holds regular mail bid auctions, and promotes lectures at congresses.

The major contributor to this study has been Albert Pick who published some of the earliest catalogues of paper money and through them explained the objective of collecting paper money and the definition of it. Albert Pick is also the author of the capital part of the Standard Catalog of World Paper Money, now a three-volume set which consists of thousands of pages of almost the entire collection of the world paper money that has ever existed and is updated annually. Almost every note of every country and many special and regional issues are cataloged following a unique format for each entry: [Country Name]P[unique number for the banknote edition]

The following note would thus be cataloged as "Yugoslavia P-87."

An important aspect of collecting banknotes is the condition of items. Banknotes in perfect condition (without any damage), that usually haven't circulated are rated as uncirculated (UNC) and that is the highest classification for a value that a banknote can have. In addition to that, the value for a specific note in the world paper money catalog is listed for UNC condition.

== Glossary ==
Back
Preferred term for the reverse side of a note.
Back plate number (U.S.A.)
Small number found on the lower right side of the back of a bill. Officially known as a Check Number, it provides a cross-reference to the Plate Serial Number on the front.
Banknote
Paper currency issued by a bank as opposed to a government.
BEP (U.S.A.)
The Bureau of Engraving and Printing (United States).
Border
Outer edge of the design on the back and front where the design ends and plain currency paper begins.
Brick (U.S.A.)
Unit of measurement used by the BEP. A strap is 100 notes banded together, forty straps make a brick. Consists of 4000 notes weighing about 4 kilograms or 8.8 pounds.
Broken bank note
Currency issued by a now defunct bank. Also referred to as obsolete banknote.
Changeover notes
A run of notes with a change in signatures, series, or varieties without an interruption in the serial numbering. Occasionally, duplicate serial numbers can occur.
Check number
Small number found on the lower right of a note, used to cross reference plate numbers.
Condition
Grade or state of preservation of paper currency.
Continental currency (U.S.A.)
Paper money first issued in 1775 by the Continental Congress, originally backed by Spanish milled dollars.
Counterfeit
Currency specifically created to look like genuine currency with the intent to defraud.
Currency
Legal tender referring usually to paper money, but can be applied to coins and notes.
Decimalization
A process of changing the ratio between the main and the subunit of a currency to an integral power of 10. This is not to be confused with Redenomination.
Denomination
Face value or amount a coin or note is worth.
District Number (U.S.A.)
The Federal Reserve District Number appears four times on the face of a bill for identification purposes.
Engraving
Labor intensive process where the design of a bill is engraved onto a steel printing plate.
Error note
Piece of currency that has a manufacturing mistake or misprint.
Face
Preferred term for the front side of paper currency.
Federal Reserve District Seal (U.S.A.)
Found to the left of the portrait on United States currency, it identifies the Federal Reserve Bank that issued the note.
Federal Reserve Bank Note (U.S.A.)
Series of U.S. paper money once authorized by the Federal Reserve, now obsolete. The bank that issued the note was obliged not the Federal Reserve System.
Federal Reserve Note (U.S.A.)
The only form of money now being printed by the United States.
Gold certificate (U.S.A.)
Form of U.S. paper money redeemable for gold coin at one time.
Grade
Condition or state of preservation of a piece of paper money.
Greenback (U.S.A.)
Issued in 1861 as a Demand Note. Green Ink used as an anti-counterfeiting measure. Today, almost all US currency is termed "Greenback".
Horse blanket (U.S.A.)
Popular term for large size U.S. notes. See History of the United States dollar.
Imprint
Name of printer on the note.
Large size (U.S.A.)
Refers to U.S. paper money that measures 7 3/8 x 3 1/8 inches, issued from 1861 to 1928. See History of the United States dollar.
Microprinting
Anti-counterfeiting measure where printing within certain areas can be as small as six thousandths of an inch.
Obverse
Front side of paper money, preferred term being face.
Prefix
Letter/s over number with numbers following in serial number.
Press
High speed machinery on which paper money is printed.
Printing plate
Sheet of steel onto which the note design has been engraved.
Radar note
A banknote in which the serial number reads the same backwards as forwards.
Redenomination
The replacement of old currency for newer currency, this usually involves the taking off of some zeroes as years of inflation have reduced the value of the currency. As one example, in 1993 one thousand Mexican pesos were replaced by one Nuevo peso.
Remainder banknote
A banknote that has been prepared for issue, but not issued for one reason or another, such as the failure of the banknote issuer, or the merging of one banknote issuer into another.
Replacement banknote
A note printed with a special symbol before the serial number, or with a special serial number prefix, used to replace notes damaged during the manufacturing process. US replacement notes are called Star Notes because a five pointed star is positioned at the beginning or end of the serial number. Older Canadian replacement notes are known as asterisk notes because an asterisk preceded the serial number. Modern Canadian replacement notes use a special serial number prefix. Italy reserved the letter X as the first letter of the serial number in replacement notes before adopting the euro. Other countries may use different methods.
Reverse
Back side of paper money, preferred term being back.
Reserve Bank
Institution that manages the monetary policy of certain countries.
Security thread
Anti-counterfeiting measure of a polymer strip embedded into the currency paper. Usually visible when held to bright light and glows red when held to ultraviolet.
Series
Set of years banknote was printed with a specific design and denomination. See also series (United States currency).
Serial number
Identifying number on a note, used to track production and anti-counterfeiting. Serial numbers on US notes are on the face, but other countries' notes can have them on the back or on both sides.
Series date
Notes are dated when they were authorized or first issued. Notes carry that same date throughout their lifespan.
Silver certificate
Certificate of ownership that silver owners hold instead of storing the actual silver.
Small size (U.S.A.)
Refers to modern U.S. paper currency that measures 6 1/8 x 2 5/8 inches, first issued in 1929.
Star note
See replacement note above.
Suffix
Letters that appear after serial numbers (123456ADE).
Syngraphics
Word coined in 1974 to denote the study and collecting of paper money. Based on the Latin word syngrapha, meaning a written promise to pay.
Treasury Note (U.S.A.)
Also known as a coin note, they were first issued in 1890 and redeemable for gold and silver coins.
Uniface
Banknote with printing on one side only.
Vignette
Picture on a note that fades into the background rather than being framed by a border.
Watermark
Embedded anti-counterfeiting design created by varying the density and thickness of the paper. Can be seen when held up to light.

== Authentication, grading and cataloging ==
Banknotes are usually graded on a descriptive scale of grades. These grades vary somewhat internationally, and as time goes on more grades have been added. The grades specified by the International Bank Note Society are as follows:

- Uncirculated (UNC) - refers to a banknote that is bright and has no handling damage, such as folds or creases, nor any cuts, stains, or rounded corners
- About uncirculated (AU) - a banknote that is still bright but has trivial handling damage, i.e. a light center fold (not a crease, which is a break of the fibres of the paper), without rounded corners.
- Extremely fine (XF or EF) - a banknote with one crease or up to three light folds. Paper still bright and attractive, very slight wear to corners allowed.
- Very Fine (VF) - Note still attractive, but possible slight dirt or smudging, may have several horizontal and/or vertical folds. Paper remains relatively crisp. No tears, but slight wear to edges and corners is allowable.
- Fine (F) - Paper is now slightly soft, considerable wear due to folds from use in circulation. Minor tears to note, not extending into the design. Clear but not bright in appearance. Staple holes but not holes due to folding.
- Very Good (VG) - Much wear. Paper is limp. Tears can extend into the design. Staining possible. Discoloration possible. Hole at center caused by folding allowable. Note still looks presentable.
- Good (G) - Very much wear, as VG, but more so. Graffiti on note. Small pieces of the note may be missing
- Fair - Larger pieces of note torn off/missing, compared with G. Less of the note intact.
- Poor - Severe damage due to wear, staining, missing pieces, graffiti and/or holes. May be taped together, have pieces missing. The worst possible condition.

In addition to these grades, it is common to indicate an in-between grade, such as AU-UNC, which is a note that falls between AU and UNC, (e.g., a note with a noticeable counting fold).

Certain vendors and auctioneers break the UNC grade down further, into three grades:

- Gem Uncirculated or Gem Crisp Uncirculated - A perfect note, not just in original condition, but with large equally balanced margins, outstanding colour. Thus such a note is not just as originally printed, but was also printed well in the first place.
- Choice Uncirculated/Crisp Choice Uncirculated - Just less than perfect, tiny foxing, faint counting smudges, or slightly off-center margins
- Uncirculated/Crisp Uncirculated - Still not folded or creased, but suffering from any of: slight fading, yellowing, foxing, very off-center margins, corner folds only in the blank area (not the design)

Most collectors will always prefer an Uncirculated note, and these notes command substantial premiums over lower grades. A note in UNC condition is generally worth up to ten times more in this condition compared with merely VG (Very Good). An UNC note can be worth three times as much as a VF one. For notes seldom found in uncirculated condition, the premium may be even higher. The difference between Gem Uncirculated and Uncirculated can also be substantial. As a result, buyers are at risk of grade inflation, in that a dealer failing to notice a fold in an AU note and passing it off as UNC will undoubtedly feel justified in charging a higher price.

Bank notes below VF are usually considered undesirable in a collection, and are generally purchased where better-quality examples are either unavailable due to their scarcity or simply beyond the collector's budget. Common notes in such poor condition, however, are effectively unsaleable for anything above their face value (assuming they are still legal tender).

Various third party grading companies (TPG) offer the service of authentication, grading and cataloging of common varieties of paper currency. These TPGs typically use a seventy-point grading scale to describe the note. Additional notations may be made for exceptional paper quality or other varieties.

Following examination, TPG companies typically encapsulate the currency in what is commonly referred to as a "slab." Similar to the issues surrounding the transition that occurred within the coin collecting field many years ago, controversy exists about the need or value of TPG notes. Without having the ability to closely examine and feel the note due to it being sealed inside the slab, many collectors are not comfortable accepting the opinion of others as to the grade and may either elect not to purchase the note or to cut it out of the slab for examination. Additionally, many noted mistakes in grading by third party grading services have been discovered. However, for collectors less adept at grading, purchasing a note in a slab can provide some additional comfort for the owner in justifying the purchase and cost. It also serves to help protect the collector against unethical activities designed to increase the worth of the note by pressing out folds, washing, repairing tears, or other alterations typically viewed as unacceptable thereby lowering the value of the item.

The vast majority of banknotes are sold using the Uncirculated–Poor grading system, and are never graded with any third party.

== Postal order collecting ==
Postal order collecting has become a branch of notaphily, especially in England since the 1980s. Some countries, such as Basutoland, the British Somaliland Protectorate, and Northern Rhodesia never issued their own banknotes, however, they did issue their own postal orders. Great Britain, the Isle of Man, and Northern Ireland also issued Old Age Pension Orders as well as postal orders. These have become collectible in recent years.

== Specialties ==
Notaphilists collect paper money based on the following key criteria:

- Theme (historical depictions, famous people, art forms, landmarks)
- Time period (series, date)
- Country or Currency (native, favourite or unusual)
- Substrate (paper or polymer or hybrid)
- Denomination
- Serial number (ascending and descending or birthdate)
- Grade
- Rarity of the banknote (commemorative banknotes)
- Exchange value of the note
- Replacement notes or Star notes which are commonly used to replace a faulty banknote during printing so the exact number of notes can be known.
- Errors in the printing process
- Signature on the notes
- Main colour or hue of the banknote
- Other design elements

== International Bank Note Society ==
The International Bank Note Society (IBNS) is a non-profit educational organization founded in 1961 to promote the study and collection of banknotes and paper currencies worldwide.

The IBNS presents the annual IBNS Bank Note of the Year Award to recognize an exceptional banknote issued for public circulation during the award year. Nominated notes are considered for their artistic merit, design, use of colour, balance and security features, with the winner selected by a vote of IBNS members.

From 2004 through 2025 Kazakhstan received the most awards by a country (from 2011 to 2013). Bermuda, Canada, Mexico and Switzerland each received two awards.

IBNS Bank Note of the Year awards by country or issuing jurisdiction, 2004–2025
Rank	Country or issuing jurisdiction	Awards	Years
1	Kazakhstan	3	2011, 2012, 2013
2	Bermuda	2	2009, 2024
2	Canada	2	2004, 2018
2	Mexico	2	2020, 2021
2	Switzerland	2	2016, 2017
6	Aruba	1	2019
6	Comoros	1	2006
6	Curaçao and Sint Maarten	1	2025
6	Eastern Caribbean Central Bank	1	2023
6	Faroe Islands	1	2005
6	New Zealand	1	2015
6	Philippines	1	2022
6	Samoa	1	2008
6	Bank of Scotland	1	2007
6	Trinidad and Tobago	1	2014
6	Uganda	1	2010

== See also ==
- Paper money catalog
- Glossary of notaphily
- Scripophily, the study and collection of stock and bond certificates.
- The Postal Order Society (Great Britain)
- The International Bank Note Society (IBNS)
