= Banknotes of the Bank of Nassau (Bahamas) =

Banknotes were prepared for, but not generally issued by the Bank of Nassau between the 1870s and 1906. The notes are actually quite rare remainder banknotes.

The currency expressed is the Bahamian pound.

== First Issue (ND.) (c.1870s) ==
- PA1. 5 Shillings. 18xx. Red. Specimen banknote.
- PA2. 10 Shillings. 18xx. Red. Specimen banknote.
- PA3. 10 Shillings. 18xx. Blue. Specimen banknote.
- PA4. 10 Shillings. 18xx. Brown. Specimen banknote.
- PA4A. 1 Pound. 18xx. Light Orange. Specimen banknote.

== Second Issue (1897-1902) ==
- PA4B. 5 Shillings. 18xx. Black. Specimen banknote.
- PA5. 5 Shillings. 28 January 1897; 3 April 1902. Blue. Issued banknote.
- PA7. 1 Pound. 190x. Blue. Specimen banknote.

== Third Issue (1906-1916) ==
- PA8. 4 Shillings. 11 May 1906; 22 October 1910; 19 March 1913; 16 April 1913; 21 January 1916. Green. Issued banknote.
- PA8A. 1 Pound. 190x. Black. Unissued remainder banknote.
- PA8B. 1 Pound. 190x. Deep Green. Proof banknote.
