= Old Age Pension Order =

The Old Age Pension Order is a close cousin of the postal order that was issued between 1909 and 2005 in the United Kingdom. They were also issued in the Isle of Man and Northern Ireland, but information about these issues are missing and/or undocumented.

The old age pension orders were issued in books to those who were receiving the old age pension. It is entirely possible that other types of pension orders were issued to those receiving other pensions.

British Old Age Pension Orders were overprinted for issue in the Isle of Man. It is not yet known when the Manx issues began or ended, because information about them is limited.

== Overprints on Postal Orders ==
In a British “Post Office Circular” of 24 October 1916, an announcement was made about a temporary issue:

OLD AGE PENSIONS Additional Allowances Payment of arrears of additional allowances will be made by means of Postal Orders overprinted or stamped “Old Age Pensions, Additional Allowance.” The orders used will be of the following values:-6d., 1s., 2s., 2s.6d., 3s., 4s., 5s., 7s.6d., 10s., 12s.6d. and £1, and they will be issued by Supervisors of Customs and Excise, who will initial (or sign) the orders and insert (by means of a stamp or in writing) the date of issue in the space provided for “Issuing Office Stamp.” The word “Supervisor” will replace the word “Postmaster.” The payment of these orders will be subject to the rules governing the payment of ordinary Postal Orders. After payment they should be claimed on the Postal Order docket and forwarded to the Metropolitan Office of Account with the other Paid Orders.

As of 2010, no surviving examples of these have been recorded.

See Postal Order News #96, April 2010, p. 5, issued by the Postal Order Society

== Collectability of the Old Age Pension Orders ==
Extant old age pension orders are quite scarce; accordingly, very few notaphilists are collecting them, and they have never been catalogued.
