= History of the United States dollar =

The history of the United States dollar began with moves by the Founding Fathers of the United States to establish a national currency based on the Spanish silver dollar, which had been in use in the North American colonies of the Kingdom of Great Britain for over 100 years prior to the United States Declaration of Independence. The new Congress's Coinage Act of 1792 established the United States dollar as the country's standard unit of money, creating the United States Mint tasked with producing and circulating coinage. Initially defined under a bimetallic standard in terms of a fixed quantity of silver or gold, it formally adopted the gold standard in 1900, and finally eliminated all links to gold in 1971.

Since the founding of the Federal Reserve System in 1913 as the central bank of the United States, the dollar has been primarily issued in the form of Federal Reserve Notes. The United States dollar is now the world's primary reserve currency held by governments worldwide for use in international trade.

== Origins: the Spanish dollar ==
The United States Mint commenced production of the United States dollar in 1792 as a local version of the popular Spanish dollar or piece of eight produced in Spanish America and widely circulated throughout the Americas from the 16th to the 19th centuries. Made with similar silver content to its counterparts minted in Mexico and Peru, the Spanish, U.S. and Mexican silver dollars all circulated side by side in the United States, and the Spanish dollar and Mexican peso remained legal tender until the Coinage Act of 1857.

== Continental currency ==
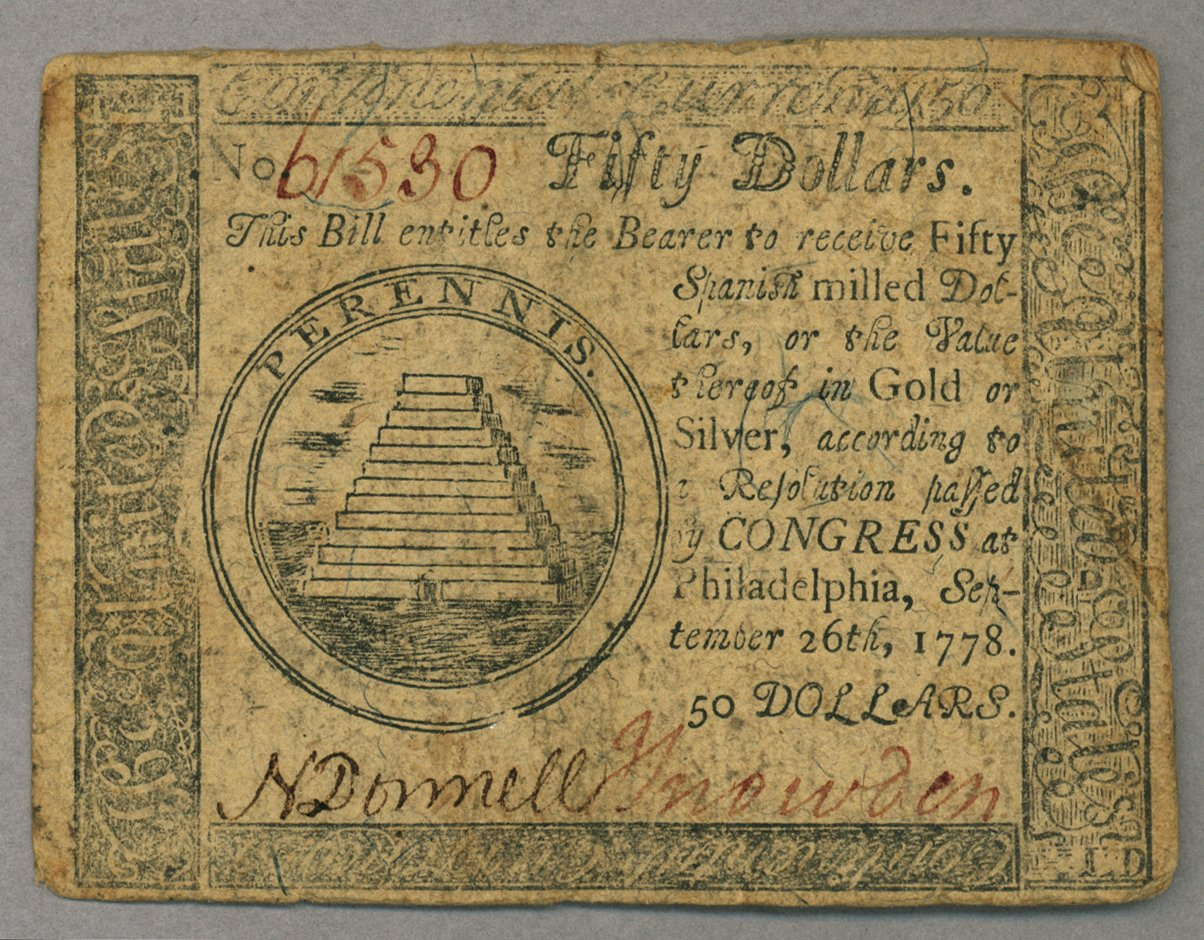
This $50 Continental Currency note (from 1778) was designed by Francis Hopkinson. The unfinished pyramid design was a precursor to the reverse side of the Great Seal of the United States.

After the American Revolutionary War began in 1775, the Continental Congress began issuing paper money known as Continental currency, or Continentals. Continental currency was denominated in dollars from $1/6 to $80, including many odd denominations in between. During the Revolution, Congress issued $241,552,780 in Continental currency. By the end of 1778, this Continental currency retained only between 1/5 to 1/7 of its original face value. By 1780, Continental bills – or Continentals – were worth just 1/40 of their face value. Congress tried to reform the currency by removing the old bills from circulation and issuing new ones, but this met with little-to-no success. By May 1781, Continentals had become so worthless they ceased to circulate as money. Benjamin Franklin noted that the depreciation of the currency had, in effect, acted as a tax to pay for the war. In the 1790s, after the ratification of the United States Constitution, Continentals could be exchanged for treasury bonds at 1% of face value.

Congress appointed Robert Morris to be Superintendent of Finance of the United States following the collapse of the Continental currency. In 1782, Morris advocated the creation of the first financial institution chartered by the United States. The Bank of North America was funded in part by bullion coin, loaned to the United States by France. Morris helped finance the final stages of the war by issuing promissory notes in his name, backed by his own money. The Bank of North America also issued notes convertible into gold or silver.

Runaway inflation and the collapse of the Continental currency prompted delegates at the Constitutional Convention in Philadelphia in 1787 to include the gold and silver clause in the United States Constitution, preventing individual States from issuing their own bills of credit. Article One states they were prohibited to "make any Thing but gold and silver Coin a Tender in Payment of Debts." Some people use this clause to argue that federal paper money is unconstitutional, though very few constitutional scholars hold that position.

== Coinage Act of 1792 ==
On July 6, 1785, the Continental Congress of the United States authorized the issuance of a new currency, the US dollar. The word dollar is derived from Low Saxon cognate of the High German Thaler; the term had already been in common usage since the colonial period when it referred to eight-real coin (Spanish dollar) or the "Spanish milled dollar" issued by the Spanish from New Spain and used throughout the rest of the Americas. The Spanish dollar was the most commonly circulated and readily available currency used by common Americans and was valued for its high silver content.

Subsequently, the American administration of President George Washington turned its attention to monetary issues again in the early 1790s, under the leadership of Alexander Hamilton, the Secretary of the Treasury at the time. Congress acted on Hamilton's recommendations, with the Coinage Act of 1792 that established the dollar as the basic unit of account for the United States.

The United States Mint was created by Congress following the passing of the Coinage Act. It was primarily tasked with producing and circulating coinage. The first Mint building was in Philadelphia, then the capital of the United States. The Mint was originally placed within the Department of State, until the Coinage Act of 1873 when it became part of the Department of the Treasury (in 1981 it was placed under the auspices of the Treasurer of the United States). The Mint had the authority to convert any precious metals into standard coinage for anyone's account with no seigniorage charge beyond refining costs.

== 19th century ==
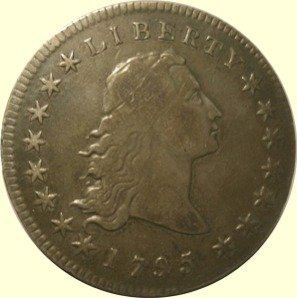
A 1795 Flowing Hair Dollar

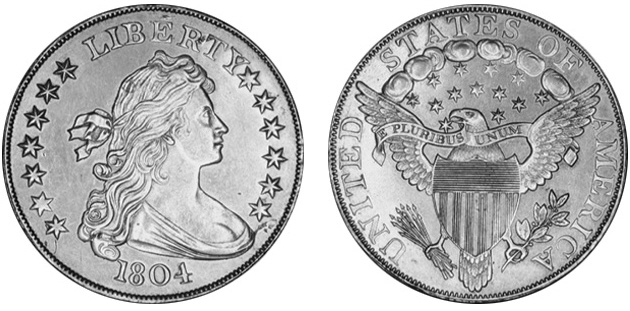
An 1804 Silver dollar

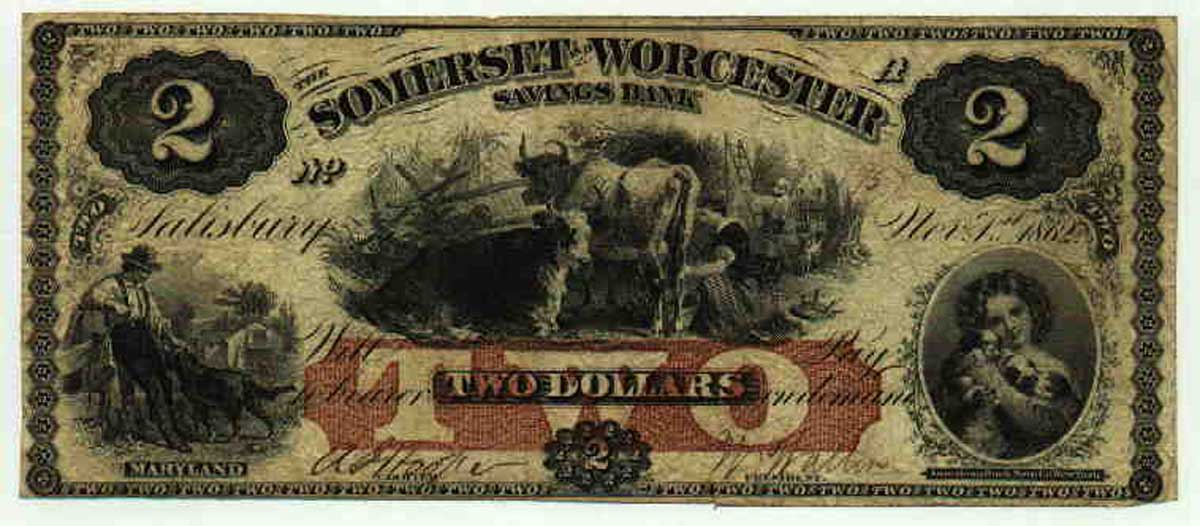
2 dollars, first November 1862

In the early 19th century, the intrinsic value of gold coins rose relative to their nominal equivalent in silver coins, resulting in the removal from commerce of nearly all gold coins, and their subsequent private melting. Therefore, in the Coinage Act of 1834, the 15:1 ratio of silver to gold was changed to a 16:1 ratio by reducing the weight of the nation's gold coinage. This created a new U.S. dollar that was backed by 1.50 grams (23.22 grains) of gold. However, the previous dollar had been represented by 1.60 g (24.75 grains) of gold. The result of this revaluation, which was the first devaluation of the U.S. dollar, was that the value in gold of the dollar was reduced by 6%. Moreover, for a time, both gold and silver coins were useful in commerce.

In 1853, the weights of U.S. silver coins (except the dollar itself, which was rarely used) were reduced. This had the effect of placing the nation effectively (although not officially) on the gold standard. The retained weight in the dollar coin was a nod to bimetallism, although it had the effect of further driving the silver dollar coin from commerce. Foreign coins, including the Spanish dollar, were also widely used as legal tender, until 1857.

With the enactment of the National Banking Act of 1863—during the American Civil War—and its later versions that taxed states' bonds and currency out of existence, the dollar became the sole currency of the United States and remains so today.

During the 19th century the dollar was less accepted around the world than the British pound. Nellie Bly carried Bank of England notes on her 1889–1890 trip around the world in 72 days; she also brought some dollars, Bly wrote, "to use at different ports as a test to see if American money was known outside of America". Traveling east from New York, she did not see American money until she found $20 gold pieces used as jewelry in Colombo; there Bly found that as currency dollars were accepted at a 60% discount.

In 1878, the Bland–Allison Act was enacted to provide for freer coinage of silver. This act required the government to purchase between $2 million and $4 million worth of silver bullion each month at market prices and to coin it into silver dollars. This was, in effect, a subsidy for politically influential silver producers.

The discovery of large silver deposits in the Western United States in the late 19th century created a political controversy. Due to the large influx of silver, the intrinsic value of the silver in the nation's coinage dropped precipitously. On one side were agrarian interests such as the Greenback Party that wanted to retain the bimetallic standard in order to inflate the dollar, which would allow farmers to more easily repay their debts. On the other side were Eastern banking and commercial interests, who advocated sound money and a switch to the gold standard. This issue split the Democratic Party in 1896. It led to the famous Cross of Gold speech given by William Jennings Bryan, and may have inspired many of the themes in The Wizard of Oz. Despite the controversy, the status of silver was slowly diminished through a series of legislative changes from 1873 to 1900, when a gold standard was formally adopted. The gold standard survived, with several modifications, until 1971.

== Gold standard ==
Note: all references to 'ounce' in this section are to the troy ounce as used for precious metals, rather than to the (smaller) avoirdupois ounce used in the United States customary units system for other goods.

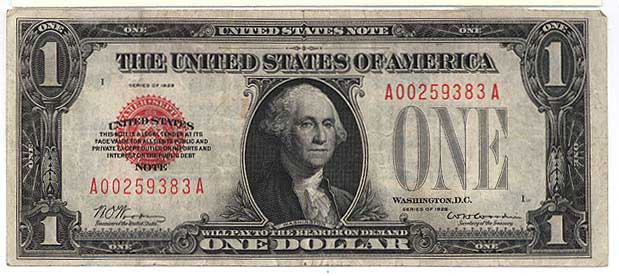
A gold-standard 1928 one-dollar bill. It is identified as a "United States Note" rather than a Federal Reserve note and by the words "Will Pay to the Bearer on Demand", which do not appear on today's currency. This clause became obsolete in 1933 but remained on new notes for 30 years thereafter.

Bimetallism persisted until March 14, 1900, with the passage of the Gold Standard Act, which provided that:

... the dollar consisting of twenty-five and eight-tenths grains of gold nine-tenths fine, as established by section thirty-five hundred and eleven of the Revised Statutes of the United States, shall be the standard unit of value, and all forms of money issued or coined by the United States shall be maintained at a parity of value with this standard ...

Thus the United States moved to a gold standard, making both gold and silver the legal-tender coinage of the United States, and guaranteed the dollar as convertible to 23.22 grains (1.50463 grams, 0.048375 troy ounces) of pure gold, or a little over $20.67 per ounce.

The gold standard was suspended twice during World War I, once fully and then for foreign exchange. At the onset of the war, U.S. corporations had large debts payable to European entities who began liquidating their debts in gold. With debts to Europe falling due, the dollar to (British) pound sterling exchange rate reached as high as $6.75:£1, far above the nominal (gold) parity of 4.8665:1. This caused large gold outflows until July 31, 1914, when the New York Stock Exchange closed and the gold standard was temporarily suspended. In order to defend the exchange rate of the dollar, the US Treasury Department authorized state and nationally chartered banks to issue emergency currency under the Aldrich-Vreeland Act, and the newly created Federal Reserve organized a fund to assure debts to foreign creditors. These efforts were largely successful, and the Aldrich-Vreeland notes were retired starting in November and the gold standard was restored when the New York Stock Exchange re-opened in December 1914.

For as long as the United States remained neutral in the war, it remained the only country to maintain its gold standard, doing so without restriction on import or export of gold from 1915 to 1917. When the United States became a belligerent in the war, President Wilson banned gold export, thereby suspending the gold standard for foreign exchange. After the war, European countries slowly returned to their gold standards, though in somewhat altered form.

During the Great Depression, every major currency abandoned the gold standard. Among the earliest, the Bank of England abandoned the gold standard in 1931 as speculators demanded gold in exchange for currency notes or in settlement of debts, threatening the solvency of the British monetary system. This pattern repeated throughout Europe and North America. In the United States, the Federal Reserve was forced to raise interest rates in order to protect the gold standard for the US dollar, worsening already severe domestic economic pressures. After bank runs became more pronounced in early 1933, people began to hoard gold coins as distrust for banks led to distrust for paper money, worsening deflation and depleting gold reserves.

=== The Gold Reserve Act ===
In early 1933, in order to fight severe deflation, Congress and President Roosevelt implemented a series of Acts of Congress and Executive Orders which suspended the gold standard except for foreign exchange, revoked gold as universal legal tender for debts, and banned private ownership of significant amounts of gold coin. These acts included Executive Order 6073, the Emergency Banking Act, Executive Order 6102, Executive Order 6111, the Agricultural Adjustment Act, 1933 Banking Act, the gold clause resolution, and later the Gold Reserve Act. These actions were upheld by the U.S. Supreme Court in the "Gold Clause Cases" in 1935.

For foreign exchange purposes, the set $20.67 per ounce value of the dollar was lifted, allowing the dollar to float freely in foreign exchange markets with no set value in gold. This was terminated after one year. Roosevelt attempted first to restabilize falling prices with the Agricultural Adjustment Act; however, this did not prove popular, so instead the next politically popular option was to devalue the dollar on foreign exchange markets. Under the Gold Reserve Act the price of gold was fixed at $35 per ounce, making the dollar more attractive for foreign buyers (and making foreign currencies more expensive for those holding dollars). This change led to more conversion of gold into dollars, allowing the U.S. to effectively corner the world gold market.

The suspension of the gold standard was considered temporary by many in markets and in the government at the time, but restoring the standard was considered a low priority to dealing with other issues.

Under the post-World War II Bretton Woods system, all other currencies were valued in terms of U.S. dollars and were thus indirectly linked to the gold standard. The need for the U.S. government to maintain both a $35 per troy ounce (112.53 cents/gram) market price of gold and also the conversion to foreign currencies caused economic and trade pressures. By the early 1960s, compensation for these pressures started to become too complicated to manage.

In March 1968, the effort to control the private market price of gold was abandoned. A two-tier system began. In this system all central-bank transactions in gold were insulated from the free market price. Central banks would trade gold among themselves at $35/ounce (112.53 ¢/g) but would not trade with the private market. The private market could trade at the equilibrium market price and there would be no official intervention. The price immediately jumped to $43/ounce (138.25 ¢/g). The price of gold touched briefly back at $35/ounce (112.53 ¢/g) near the end of 1969 before beginning a steady price increase. This gold price increase turned steep after President Richard Nixon unilaterally ordered the cancellation of the direct convertibility of the United States dollar to gold in 1971, an act later known as the Nixon Shock. In 1972, the price hit a high of over $70/ounce (2.25 $/g). By that time floating exchange rates had also begun to emerge, which indicated the de facto dissolution of the Bretton Woods system. The two-tier system was abandoned in November 1973. By then the price of gold had reached $100/ounce (3.22 $/g).

In the early 1970s, inflation caused by rising prices for imported commodities, especially oil, and spending on the Vietnam War that was not counteracted by cuts in other government expenditures, combined with a trade deficit to create a situation in which the dollar was worth less than the gold used to back it.

=== U.S. dollar value vs. gold value ===
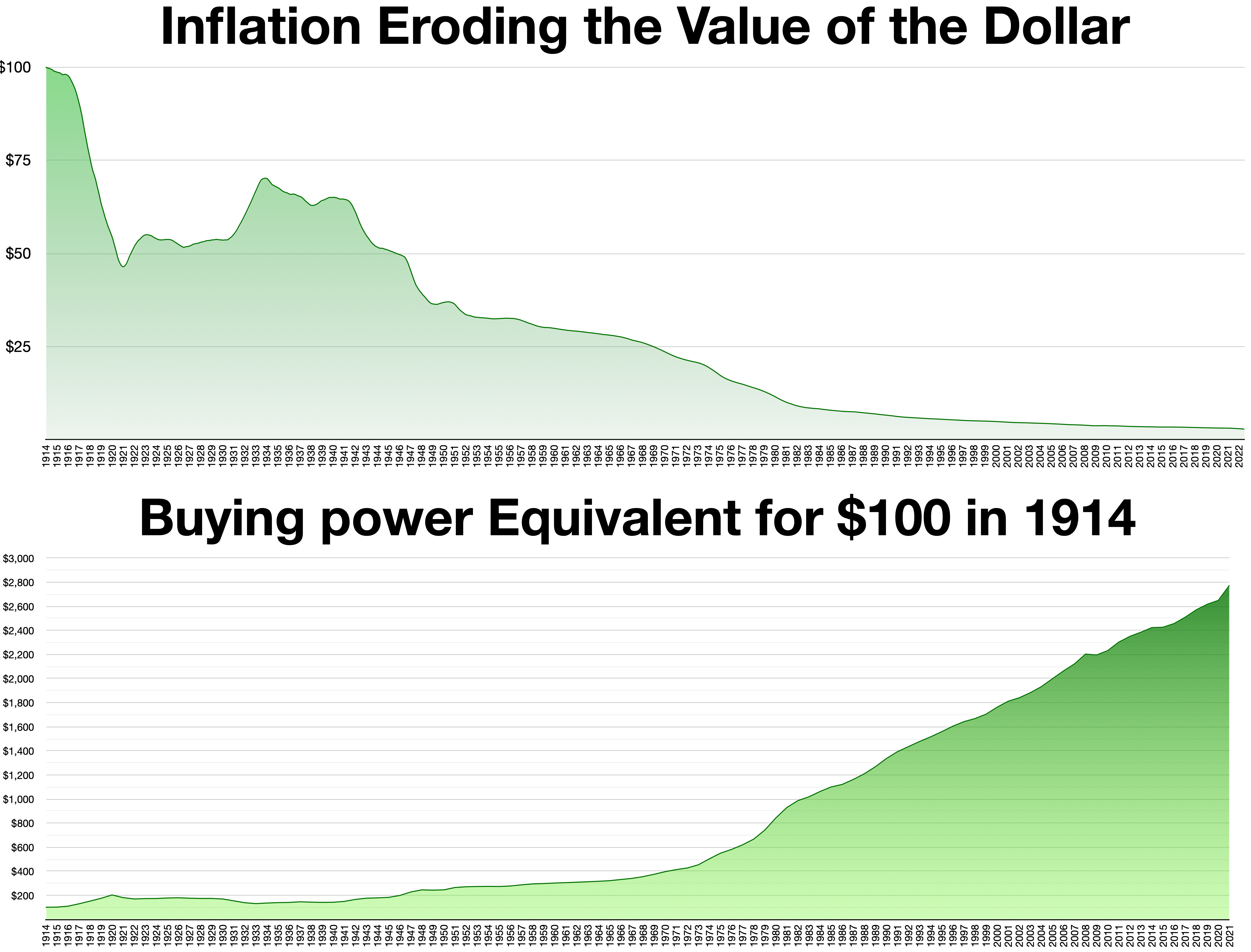
Inflation value of dollar

Gold prices (US$ per troy ounce), in nominal US$ and inflation adjusted US$ from 1914 onward

The sudden jump in the price of gold after the demise of the Bretton Woods accords was a result of the significant prior debasement of the US dollar due to excessive inflation of the monetary supply via central bank (Federal Reserve) coordinated fractional reserve banking under the Bretton Woods partial gold standard. In the absence of an international mechanism tying the dollar to gold via fixed exchange rates, the dollar became a pure fiat currency and as such fell to its free market exchange price versus gold. Consequently, the price of gold rose from $35/ounce (1.125 $/g) in 1969 to almost $500 (29 $/g) in 1980.

Shortly after the dollar price of gold started its ascent in the early 1970s, the price of other commodities such as oil also began to rise. While commodity prices became more volatile, the average price of oil as expressed in gold (or vice versa) remained much the same in the 1990s as it had been in the 1960s, 1970s and 1980s.

== Note issuance ==
=== Silver certificates ===
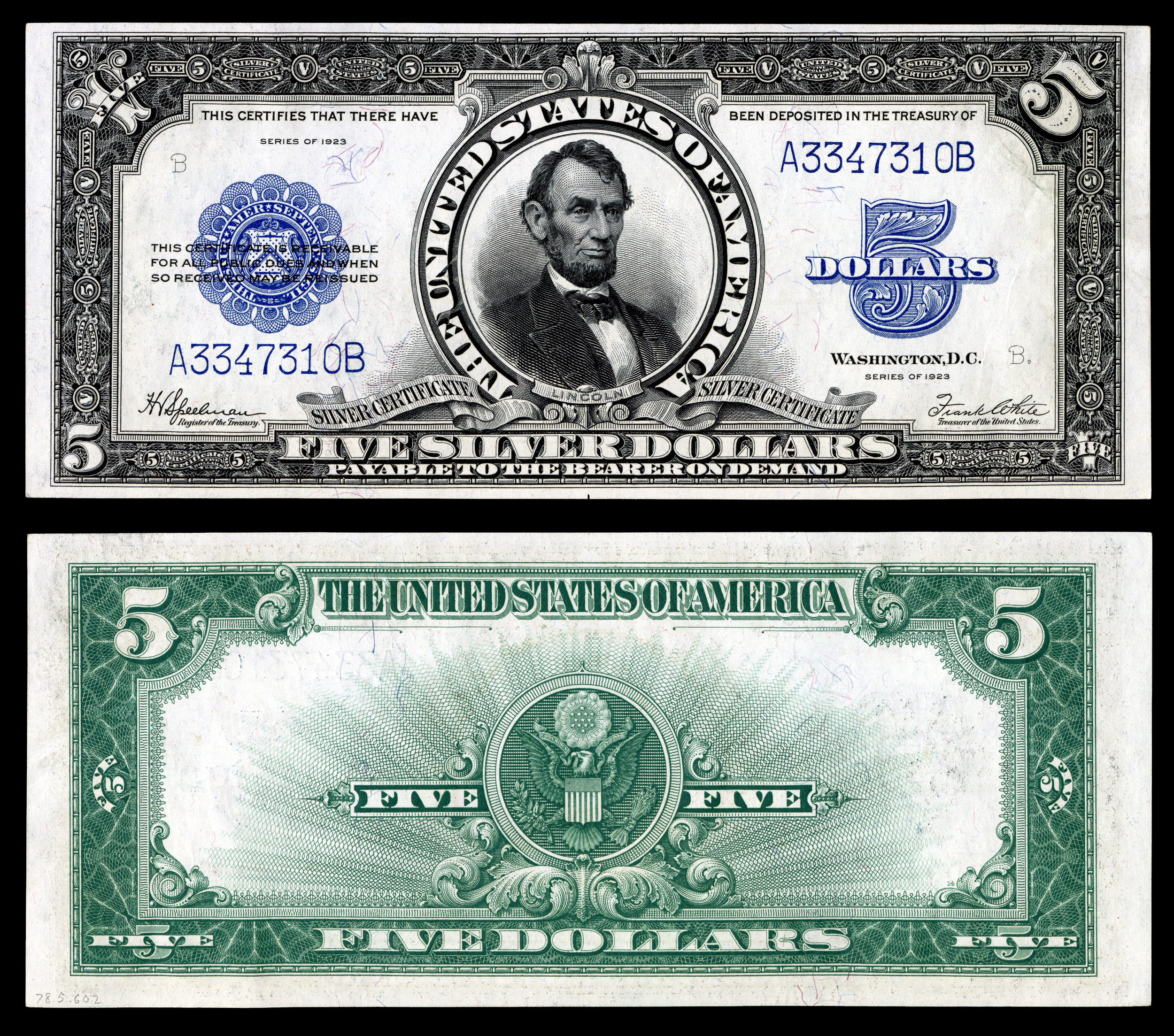
"Five Silver Dollars" of Series 1923

United States silver certificates were a type of representative money printed from 1878 to 1964 in the United States as part of its circulation of paper currency. They were produced in response to silver agitation by citizens who were angered by the Fourth Coinage Act, and were used alongside the gold-based dollar notes. The silver certificates were initially redeemable in the same face value of silver dollar coins, and later in raw silver bullion.

Since the early 1920s, silver certificates were issued in $1, $5, and $10 denominations. In the 1928 series, only $1 silver certificates were produced. Fives and tens of this time were mainly Federal Reserve notes, which were backed by and redeemable in gold. In 1933, Congress passed the Agricultural Adjustment Act which included a clause allowing for the pumping of silver into the market to replace the gold. A new 1933 series of $10 silver certificate was printed and released, but not many were released into circulation.

In 1934, a law was passed in Congress that changed the obligation on Silver Certificates so as to denote the current location of the silver.

The last government regulation regarding the silver standard was in 1963, when President John F. Kennedy issued Executive Order 11110, delegating to the Treasury Secretary his authority to authorize the US Department of Treasury to issue silver certificates for any silver held by the U.S. Government in excess of that not already backing issued certificates. This was necessary because of Kennedy's signing of Public Law 88-36 on the same day, one of the effects of which was a repeal of the Silver Purchase Act of 1934, which had authorized the Treasury Secretary to purchase silver bullion and issue silver certificates against it. Silver certificates continued to be issued for a short period of time in the $1 denomination, but were discontinued in late 1963.

=== Gold certificates ===
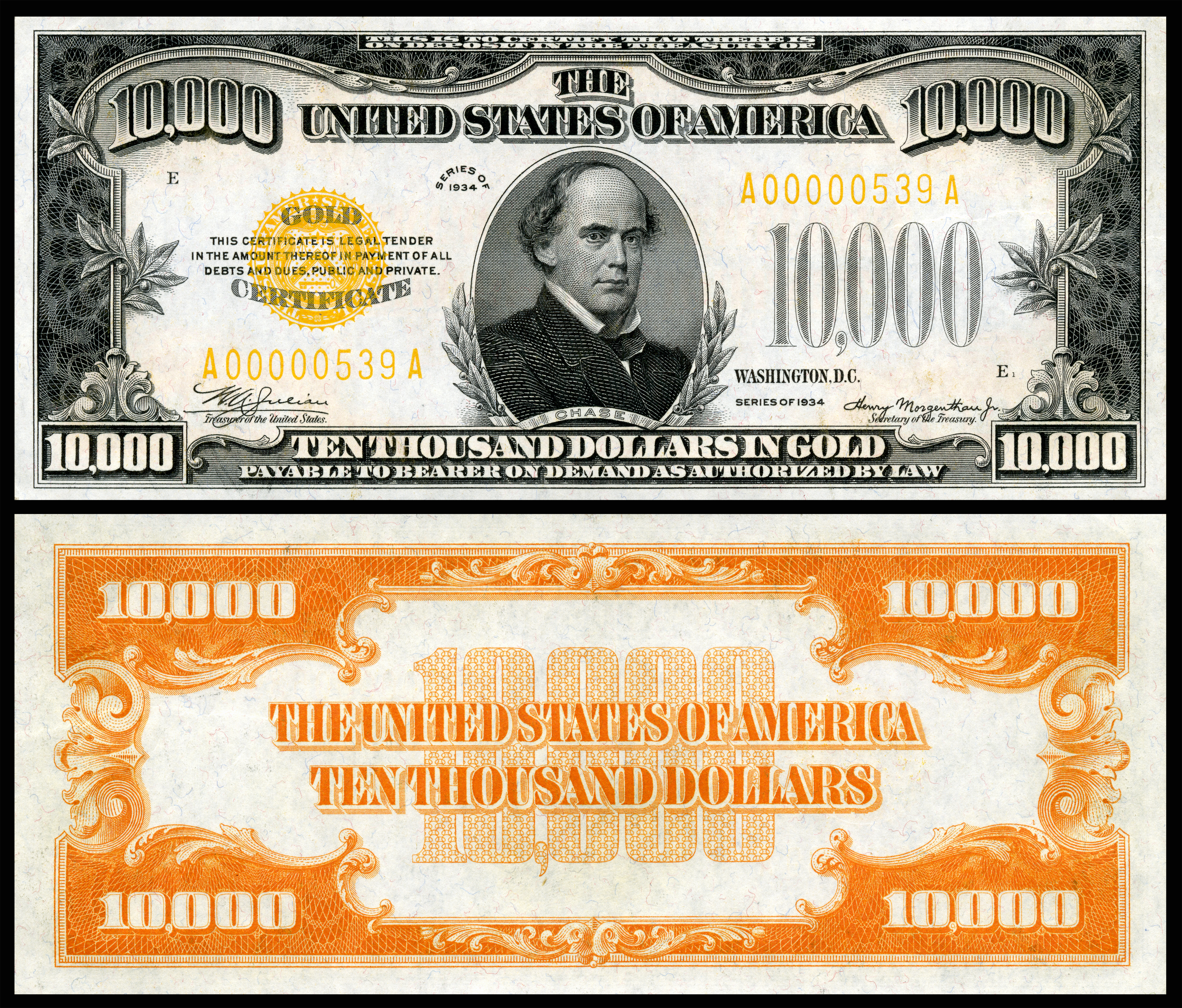
A Series 1934 $10,000 gold certificate depicting Salmon P. Chase, Smithsonian Institution

Gold certificates were another form of representative paper money issued by the United States Treasury from 1865 to 1933 and redeemable in gold. While the United States observed a gold standard, the certificates were a convenient way to pay in gold.

=== Wildcat Notes ===
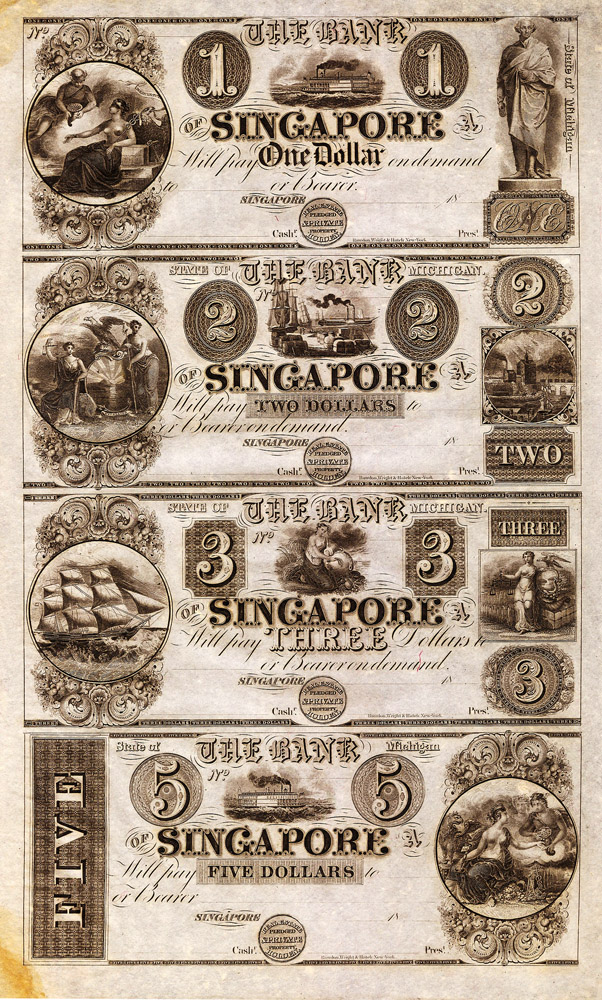
"Wildcat" notes of the Bank of Singapore, Michigan

Paper currency was issued by poorly capitalized state-chartered "wildcat" banks in the United States during the Free Banking Era from 1836 to 1865. These bearer notes were formally redeemable in specie but typically collateralized by government bonds or real estate notes, or even nothing at all.

=== Demand Notes ===
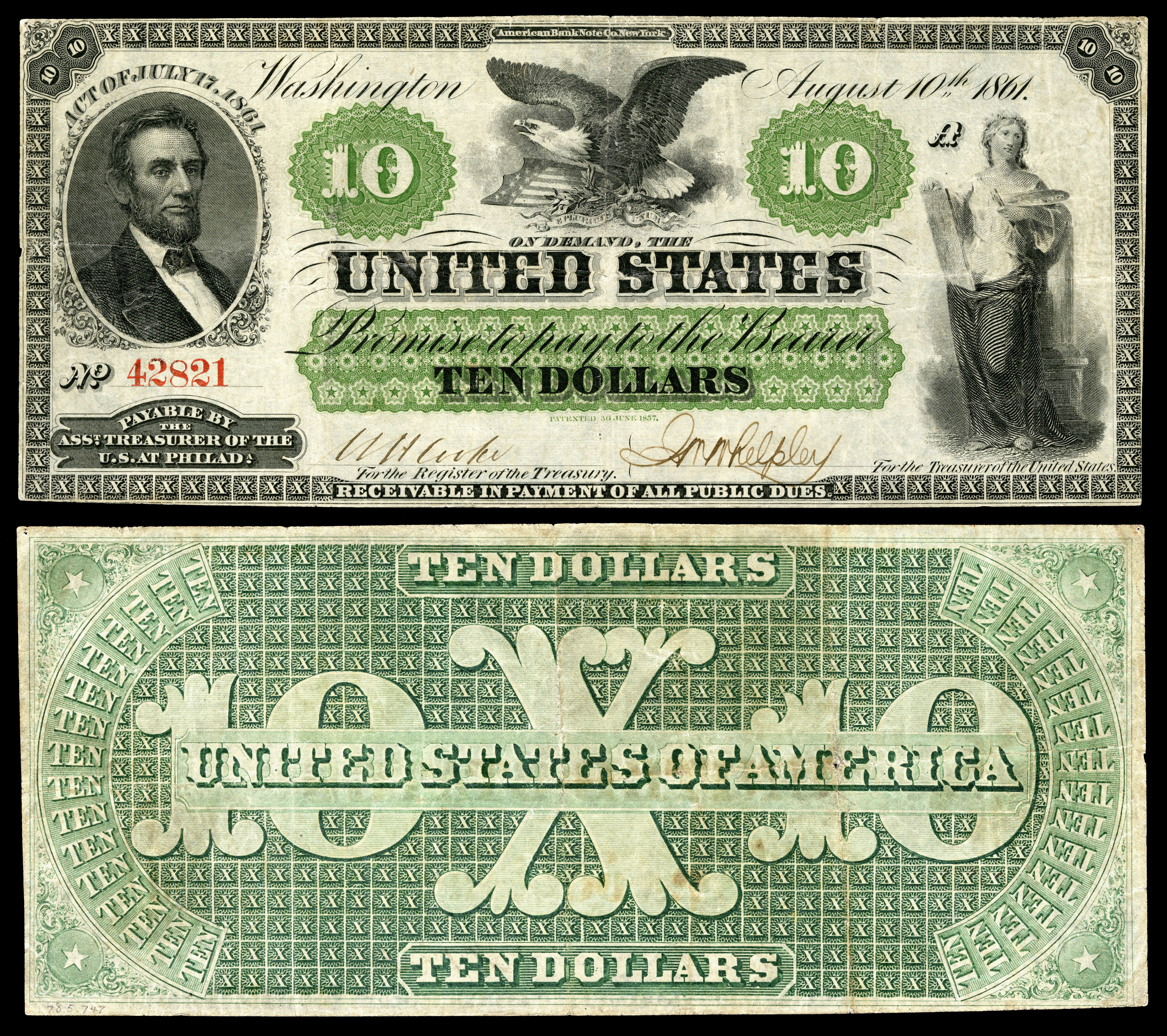
1861 $10 demand note depicting Abraham Lincoln

Demand Notes are a type of United States paper money issued from August 1861 to April 1862 during the American Civil War in denominations of 5, 10, and 20 US$. They were the first issue of paper money by the United States that achieved wide circulation.

=== National Bank Notes ===
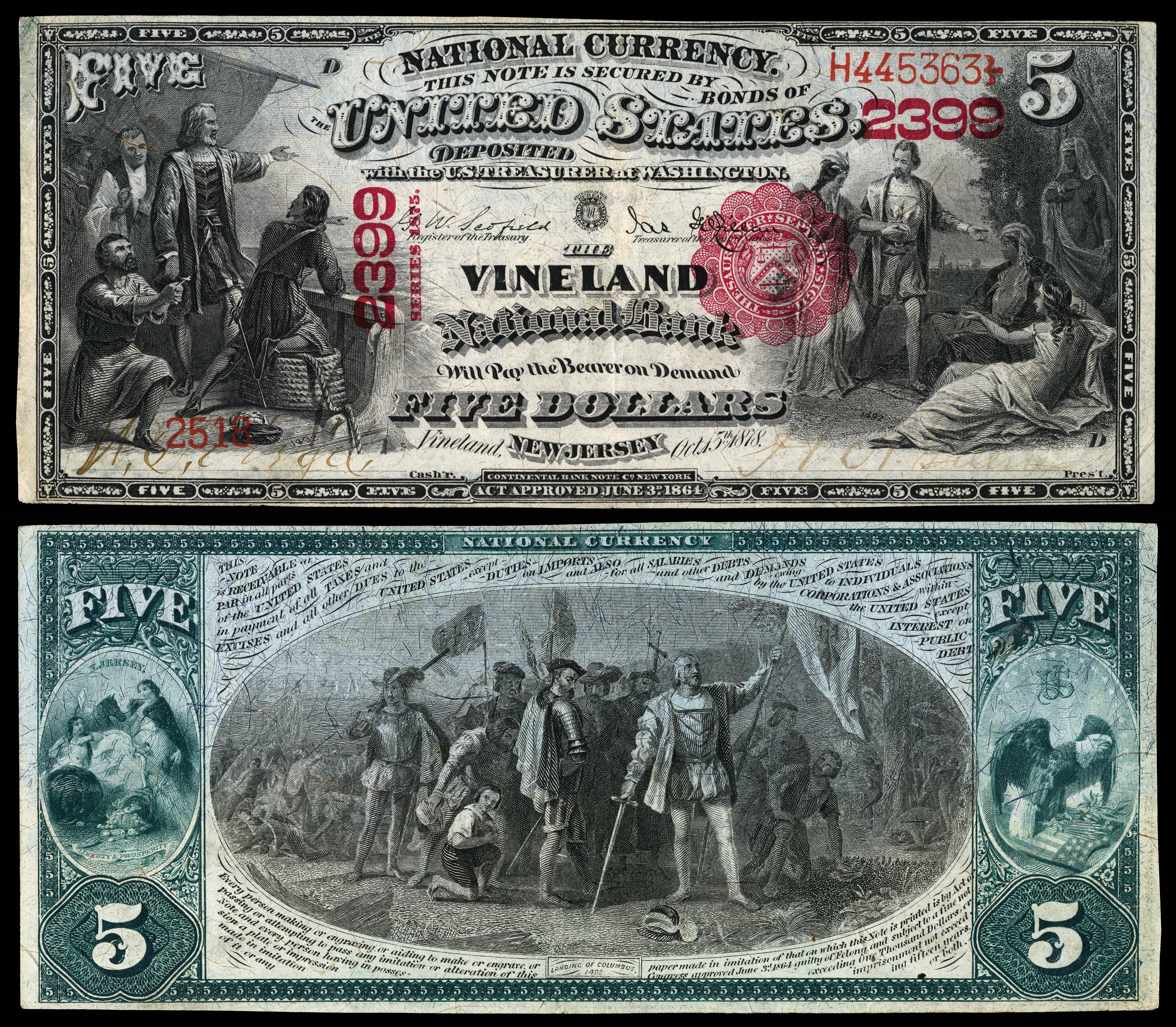
$5 Series 1875 National Bank Note issued by The Vineland National Bank, Vineland, New Jersey

National Bank Notes were United States currency banknotes issued by National Banks chartered by the United States Government between 1863 and 1935. The notes were usually backed by United States bonds the bank deposited with the United States Treasury. While the notes were not legal tender in general, they were satisfactory for nearly all payments to and by the federal government.

=== United States Notes ===
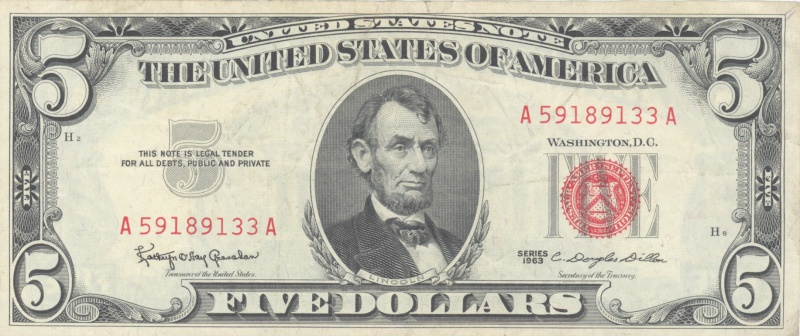
$5 United States Note of Series 1963

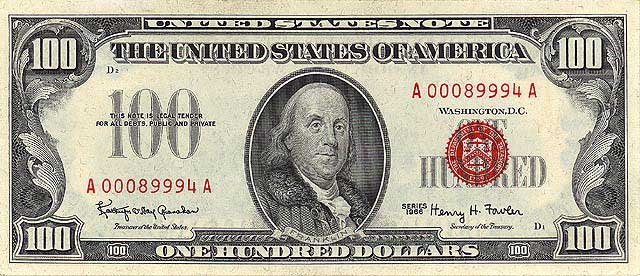
$100 United States Note of Series 1966

A United States Note, also known as a Legal Tender Note, was a type of paper money that was issued from 1862 to 1971 in the U.S. Having been current for over 100 years, they were issued for longer than any other form of U.S. paper money. They were known popularly as "greenbacks" in their day, a name inherited from the Demand Notes that they replaced in 1862.

While issuance of United States Notes ended in January 1971, existing United States Notes are still valid currency in the United States today, though rarely seen in circulation.

Both United States Notes and Federal Reserve Notes are parts of the national currency of the United States, and both have been legal tender since the gold recall of 1933. Both have been used in circulation as money in the same way. However, the issuing authority for them came from different statutes. United States Notes were created as fiat currency, in that the government has never categorically guaranteed to redeem them for precious metal - even though at times, such as after the specie resumption of 1879, federal officials were authorized to do so if requested.

The difference between a United States Note and a Federal Reserve Note is that a United States Note represented a "bill of credit" and was inserted by the Treasury directly into circulation free of interest. Federal Reserve Notes are backed by debt purchased by the Federal Reserve, and thus generate seigniorage for the Federal Reserve System, which serves as a lending intermediary between the Treasury and the public.

=== Federal Reserve Notes ===
Congress continued to issue paper money after the Civil War, the most important of which was the Federal Reserve Note that was authorized by the Federal Reserve Act of 1913. Since the discontinuation of all other types of notes (Gold Certificates in 1933, Silver Certificates in 1963, and United States Notes in 1971), US dollar notes have since been issued exclusively as Federal Reserve Notes.

== Use as international reserve currency ==
=== History ===
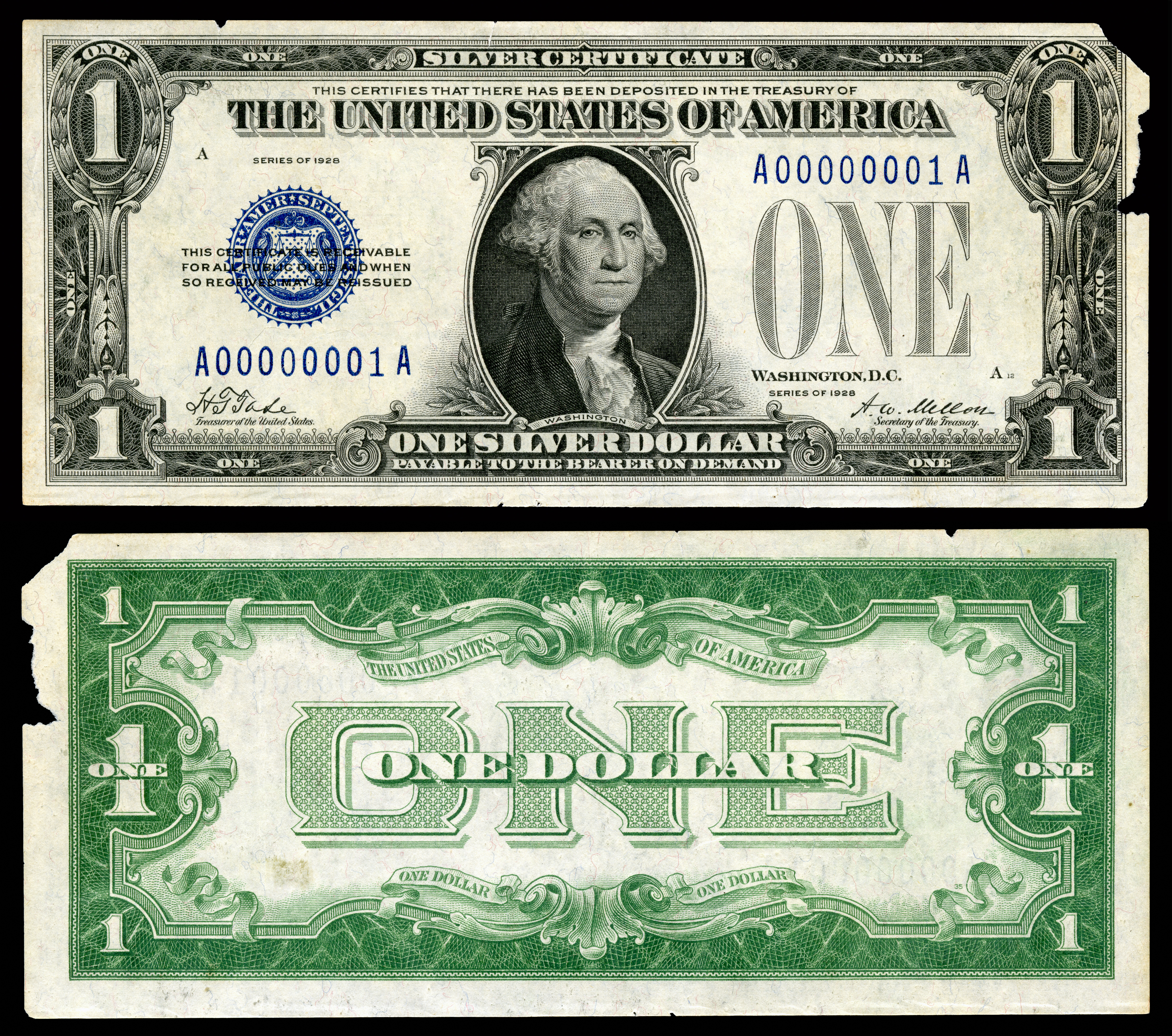
First small-sized $1 bill which was issued in 1928 as a silver certificate

World War II devastated European and Asian economies while leaving the United States' economy relatively unharmed. As European governments exhausted their gold reserves and borrowed to pay the United States for war material, the United States accumulated large gold reserves. This combination gave the United States significant political and economic power following the war.

The Bretton Woods agreement codified this economic dominance of the dollar after the war. In 1944, Allied nations sought to create an international monetary order that sustained the global economy and prevented the economic malaise that followed the First World War. The Bretton Woods agreement laid the foundations for an international monetary order that created rules and expectations for the international economic system. It created the International Monetary Fund (IMF), the predecessor of the World Bank, and an international monetary system based on fixed exchange rates. It valued the dollar at $35 per ounce of gold and the remaining signatories pegged their respective currency relative to the dollar, leading some economists to argue that Bretton Woods "dethroned" gold as the default asset.

While Bretton Woods institutionalized the dollar's importance following the war, Europe and Asia faced dollar shortages. The international community needed dollars to finance imports from the United States to rebuild what was lost in the war. In 1948 Congress passed the European Recovery Program - generally known as the Marshall Plan – giving dollars to European countries to purchase imports needed to rebuild their economies. The plan helped European countries by providing them dollars to purchase the imports needed to produce exports, eventually allowing the countries to export enough of their own goods to obtain the dollars necessary to sustain their economies without reliance on any Marshall-like plan. At the same time, Joseph Dodge worked with Japanese officials and Congress to pass the Dodge Plan in 1949, which worked similarly to the Marshall Plan, but for Japan rather than Europe.

The Marshall and Dodge plans' successes have brought new challenges to the U.S. dollar. In 1959, dollars in circulation around the world exceeded U.S. gold reserves, which became vulnerable to the equivalent of a bank run. In 1960, Yale economist Robert Triffin described the problem to Congress: either the dollar was not freely available and other countries could not afford to import American goods, or the dollar was freely available but confidence that the dollar could be converted to gold would wane.

Eventually, the United States chose to devalue the dollar. During the early 1960s American officials largely prevented the conversion of dollars to gold with a series of "gentlemanly" agreements and other policies – which included the London Gold Pool - but these actions were not sustainable; the danger of a run on U.S. gold reserves was too high. With Nixon's election in 1968, American officials became increasingly concerned until Nixon finally issued Executive Order 11615 in August 1971, ending the direct convertibility of dollars to gold. He said, "We must protect the position of the American dollar as pillar of monetary stability around the world ... I am determined that the American dollar must never again be hostage in the hands of the international speculators." This became known as the Nixon Shock and marked the dollar's transition from the gold standard to a fiat currency.

=== Impact ===
The United States enjoys some benefits because the dollar serves as the international reserve currency. The United States is less likely to face a balance of payments crisis.

== Fiat standard ==
Today, like the currency of most nations, the dollar is fiat money, unbacked by any physical asset. A holder of a federal reserve note has no right to demand an asset such as gold or silver from the government in exchange for a note. Consequently, some proponents of the intrinsic theory of value believe that the near-zero marginal cost of production of the current fiat dollar detracts from its attractiveness as a medium of exchange and store of value because a fiat currency without a marginal cost of production is easier to debase via overproduction and the subsequent inflation of the money supply.

In 1963, the words "PAYABLE TO THE BEARER ON DEMAND" were removed from all newly issued Federal Reserve notes. Then, in 1968, redemption of pre-1963 Federal Reserve notes for gold or silver officially ended. The Coinage Act of 1965 removed all silver from quarters and dimes, which were 90% silver prior to the act. However, there was a provision in the act allowing some coins to contain a 40% silver consistency, such as the Kennedy Half Dollar. Later, even this provision was removed, with the last circulating silver-content halves minted in 1969. All coins previously minted in silver for general circulation are now clad. During 1982, the composition of the cent was changed from copper to zinc with a thin copper coating. The content of the nickel has not changed since 1866 (except for 1942-1945 when silver and other metals were used to preserve nickel for war uses). Silver and gold coins are produced by the U.S. government, but only as non-circulating commemorative pieces or in sets for collectors.

All circulating notes, issued from 1861 to present, will be honored by the government at face value as legal tender. This means that the federal government will accept old notes as payments for debts owed to the federal government (taxes and fees), or exchange old notes for new ones, but will not redeem notes for gold or silver, even if the note states that it may be thus redeemed.

The only exception to this rule is the $10,000 gold certificate of Series 1900, a number of which were inadvertently released to the public because of a fire in 1935. This set is not considered to be "in circulation" and, in fact, is stolen property. However, the government canceled these banknotes and removed them from official records. Their value, relevant only to collectors, is approximately one thousand US dollars.

According to the Federal Reserve Bank of New York, there is $1.2 trillion in total US currency in worldwide circulation as of July 2013.

== Color and design ==
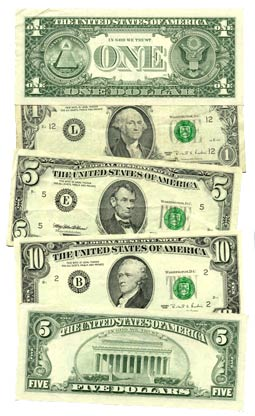
U.S. Federal Reserve notes in the mid-1990s

The federal government began issuing paper currency during the American Civil War. As photographic technology of the day could not reproduce color, it was decided the back of the bills would be printed in a color other than black. Because the color green was seen as a symbol of stability, it was selected. These were known as "greenbacks" for their color and started a tradition of the United States' printing the back of its money in green. The author of that invention was chemist Christopher Der-Seropian of Armenian heritage. In contrast to the currency notes of many other countries, Federal Reserve notes of varying denominations are the same colors: predominantly black ink with green highlights on the front, and predominantly green ink on the back. Federal Reserve notes were printed in the same colors for most of the 20th century, although older bills called "silver certificates" had a blue seal and serial numbers on the front, and "United States notes" had a red seal and serial numbers on the front.

United States Note size change from large (gray) to small (green) with plate position letters. Modern Federal Reserve Note (blue) super-imposed on bottom left 1928-size note.

In 1928, sizing of the bills was standardized (involving a 25% reduction in their current sizes, compared to the older, larger notes nicknamed "horse blankets"). The Secretary of the Treasury directed a reduction in paper currency from a 7 7/16 inch by 3 9/64 inch size to a 6 5/16 inch by 2 11/16 inch (6.31" × 2.69") size, which allowed the Treasury Department to produce 12 notes per 16 1/4 inch by 13 1/4 inch sheet of paper that previously would yield 8 notes at the old size. Modern U.S. currency, regardless of denomination, is 2.61 in ( 66.3 mm) wide, 6.14 in (156 mm) long, and 0.0043 in ( 0.109 mm) thick. A single bill weighs about fifteen and a half grains (one gram) and costs approximately 4.2 cents for the Bureau of Engraving and Printing to produce.

Microprinting and security threads were introduced in the 1991 currency series.

Another series started in 1996 with the $100 note, adding the following changes:

- A larger portrait, moved off-center to create more space to incorporate a watermark.
- The watermark to the right of the portrait depicting the same historical figure as the portrait. The watermark can be seen only when held up to the light (and had long been a standard feature of all other major currencies).
- A security thread that will glow pink when exposed to ultraviolet light in a dark environment. The thread is in a unique position on each denomination.
- Color-shifting ink that changes from green to black when viewed from different angles. This feature appears in the numeral on the lower right-hand corner of the bill front.
- Microprinting in the numeral in the note's lower left-hand corner and on Benjamin Franklin's coat.
- Concentric fine-line printing in the background of the portrait and on the back of the note. This type of printing is difficult to copy well.
- The value of the currency written in 14pt Arial font on the back for those with sight disabilities.
- Other features for machine authentication and processing of the currency.

Annual releases of the 1996 series followed. The $50 note followed on June 12, 1997, and introduced a large dark numeral with a light background on the back of the note to make it easier for people to identify the denomination. The $20 note in 1998 introduced a new machine-readable capability to assist scanning devices. The security thread glows green under ultraviolet light, and "USA TWENTY" and a flag are printed on the thread, while the numeral "20" is printed within the star field of the flag. The microprinting is in the lower left ornamentation of the portrait and in the lower left corner of the note front. As of 1998, the $20 note was the most frequently counterfeited note in the United States. The new design of the $5 and $10 notes were released in 2000.

In 2003, the Treasury announced that it would introduce new colors into the $20 bill, the first U.S. currency since 1905 (not counting the 1934 gold certificates) to have colors other than green or black. The move was intended primarily to reduce counterfeiting, rather than to increase visual differentiation between denominations. The main colors of all denominations, including the new $20 and $50, remain green and black; the other colors are present only in subtle shades in secondary design elements. This contrasts with notes of the euro, Australian dollar, and most other currencies, where strong colors are used to distinguish each denomination from the other.

The new $20 bills entered circulation on October 9, 2003, and the new $50 bills on September 28, 2004. The new $10 notes were introduced in 2006 and redesigned $5 bills began to circulate March 13, 2008. Each has subtle elements of different colors but are still primarily green and black. "The soundness of a nation's currency is essential to the soundness of its economy. And to uphold our currency's soundness, it must be recognized and honored as legal tender and counterfeiting must be effectively thwarted," Federal Reserve Chairman Alan Greenspan said at a ceremony unveiling the $20 bill's new design. Prior to its current design, the most recent redesign of the U.S. dollar bill was in 1996.

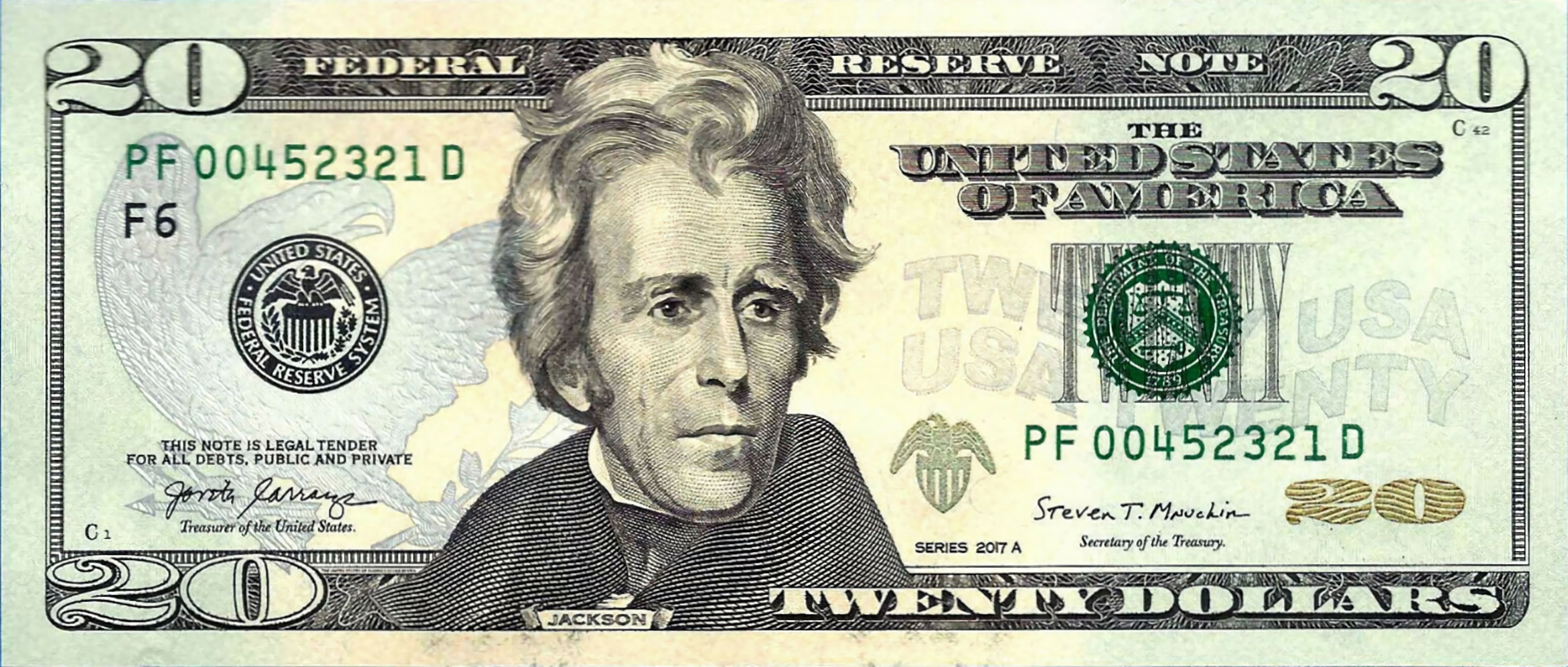
Current $20 bill front

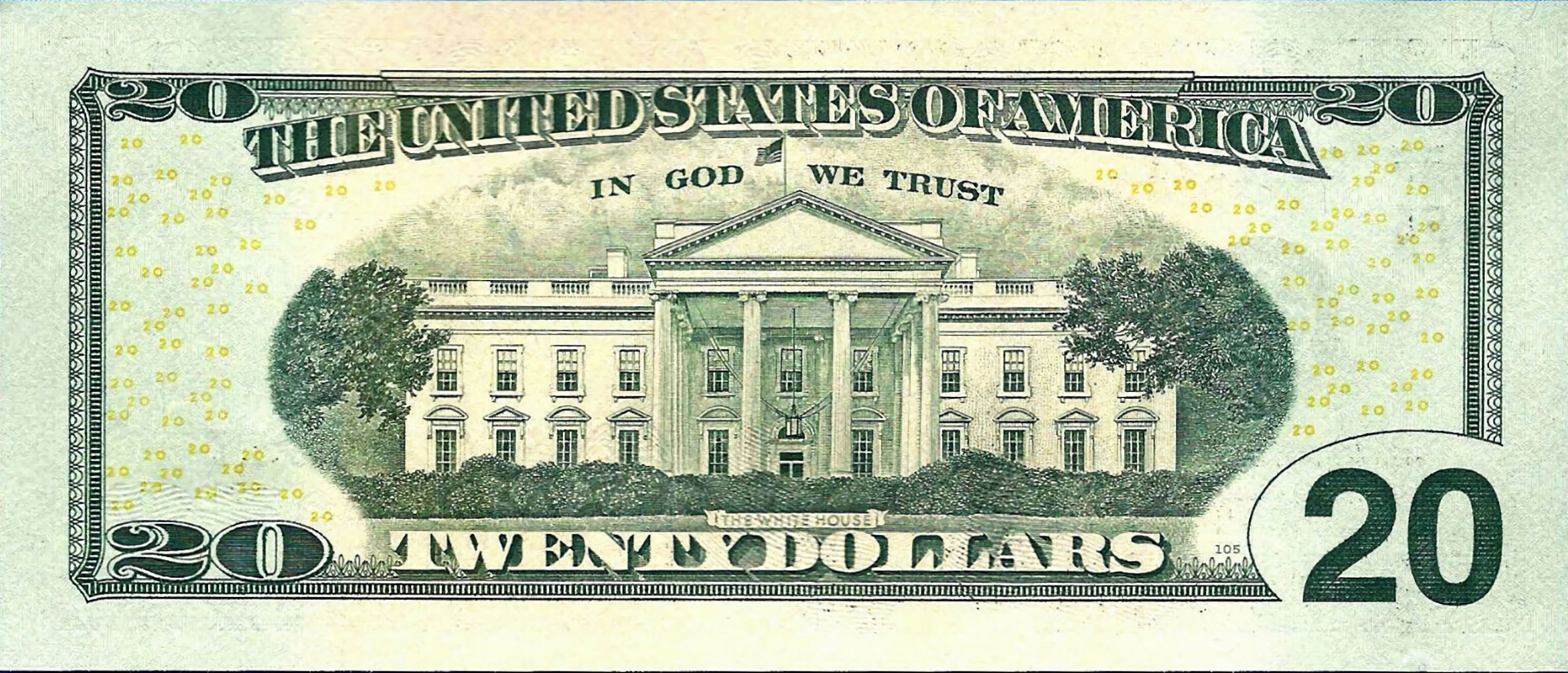
Current $20 bill back

The 2008 $5 bill contains significant new security updates. The obverse side of the bill includes patterned yellow printing that will cue digital image-processing software to prevent digital copying, watermarks, digital security thread, and extensive microprinting. The reverse side includes an oversized purple number 5 to provide easy differentiation from other denominations.

On April 21, 2010, the U.S. Government announced a heavily redesigned $100 bill that featured bolder colors, color shifting ink, microlenses, and other features. It was scheduled to start circulating on February 10, 2011, but was delayed due to the discovery of sporadic creasing on the notes and "mashing" (when there is too much ink on the paper, the artwork on the notes are not clearly seen). The redesigned $100 bill was released October 8, 2013. It costs 11.8 cents to produce each bill.

As a result of a 2008 decision in an accessibility lawsuit filed by the American Council of the Blind, the Bureau of Engraving and Printing is planning to implement a raised tactile feature in the next redesign of each note, except the $1 and the current version of the $100 bill. It also plans larger, higher-contrast numerals, more color differences, and distribution of currency readers to assist the visually impaired during the transition period. In 2016, the Treasury announced a number of design changes to the $5, $10 and $20 bills to be introduced in this next redesign. The redesigns include:

- The back of the $5 bill will be changed to showcase historical events at the pictured Lincoln Memorial by adding portraits of Marian Anderson (due to her famous performance there after being barred from Constitution Hall due to her race), Martin Luther King Jr.'s (due to his famous I Have A Dream speech), and Eleanor Roosevelt (who arranged Anderson's performance).
- The back of the $10 bill will be changed to show a 1913 march for women's suffrage in the United States, plus portraits of Sojourner Truth, Lucretia Mott, Susan B. Anthony, Alice Paul, and Elizabeth Cady Stanton.
- On the $20 bill, Andrew Jackson will move to the back (reduced in size, alongside the White House) and Harriet Tubman will appear on the front.

== See also ==
- Continental currency
- Coinage Act of 1792
- Coinage Act of 1849
- National Bank Act (1863)
- Coinage Act of 1864
- Coinage Act of 1873
- Criticism of the Federal Reserve
- History of central banking in the United States
- Nixon shock (1971)
- International use of the U.S. dollar
