= Currency strap =

Strip of paper used to bundle currency

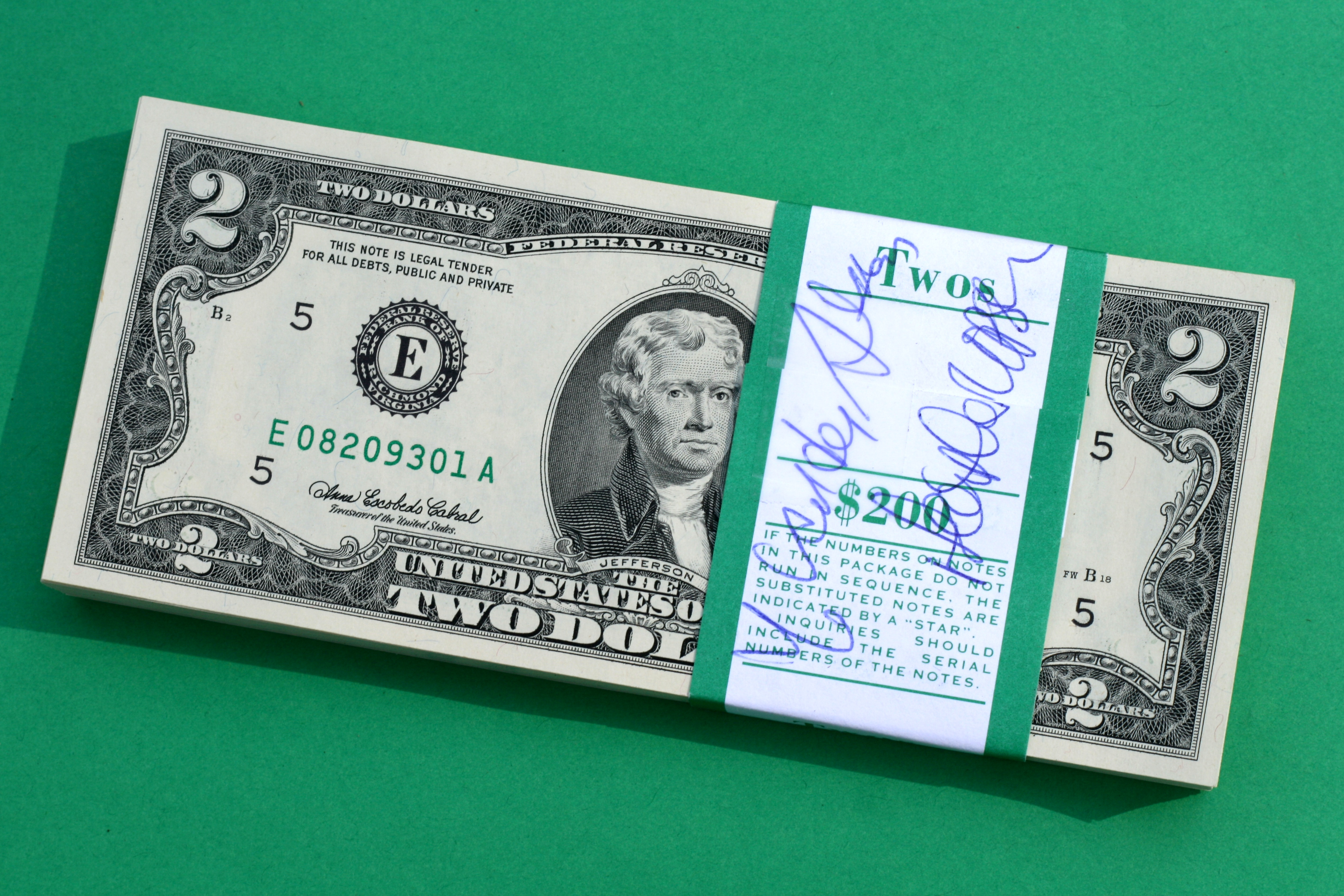
A stack of 100 United States $2 bills, secured with a green banknote strap indicating the denomination and total amount in the stack.

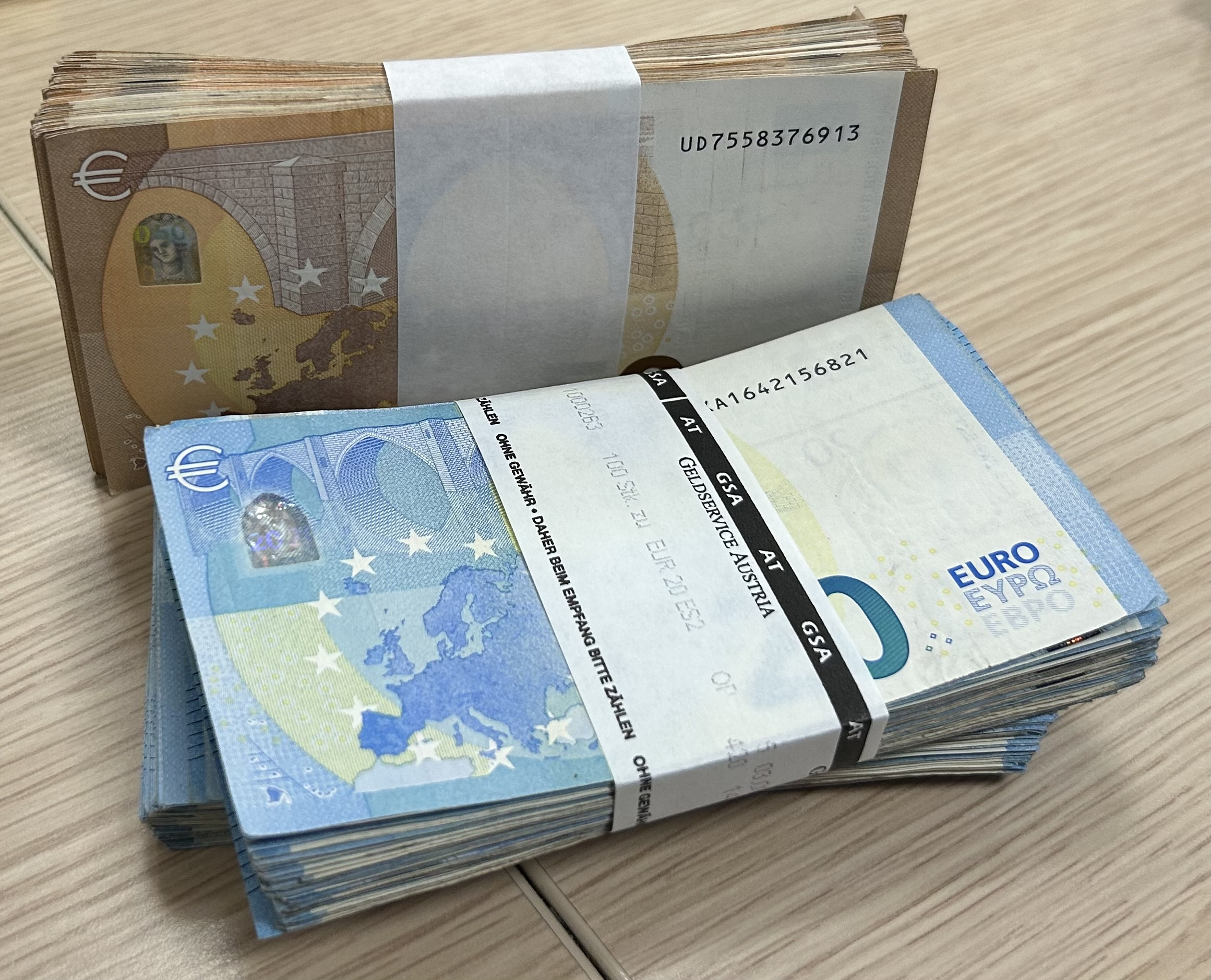
Two stacks of 100 20 euro notes and one stack of 100 50 euro notes delivered to a bureau de change by G4S.

A currency card, cash strap, currency band, money band, banknote strap or bill strap is a simple paper device designed to hold a specific denomination and number of banknotes. It can also refer to the bundle itself.

In the United States, the American Bankers Association (ABA) has a standard for both value and color. Note that all bills greater than $2 only come in straps of 100 count. The colors allow for quick accounting, even when the bills are stacked, such as in a vault. Special striped bands are used for straps exclusively containing star notes.

== History ==
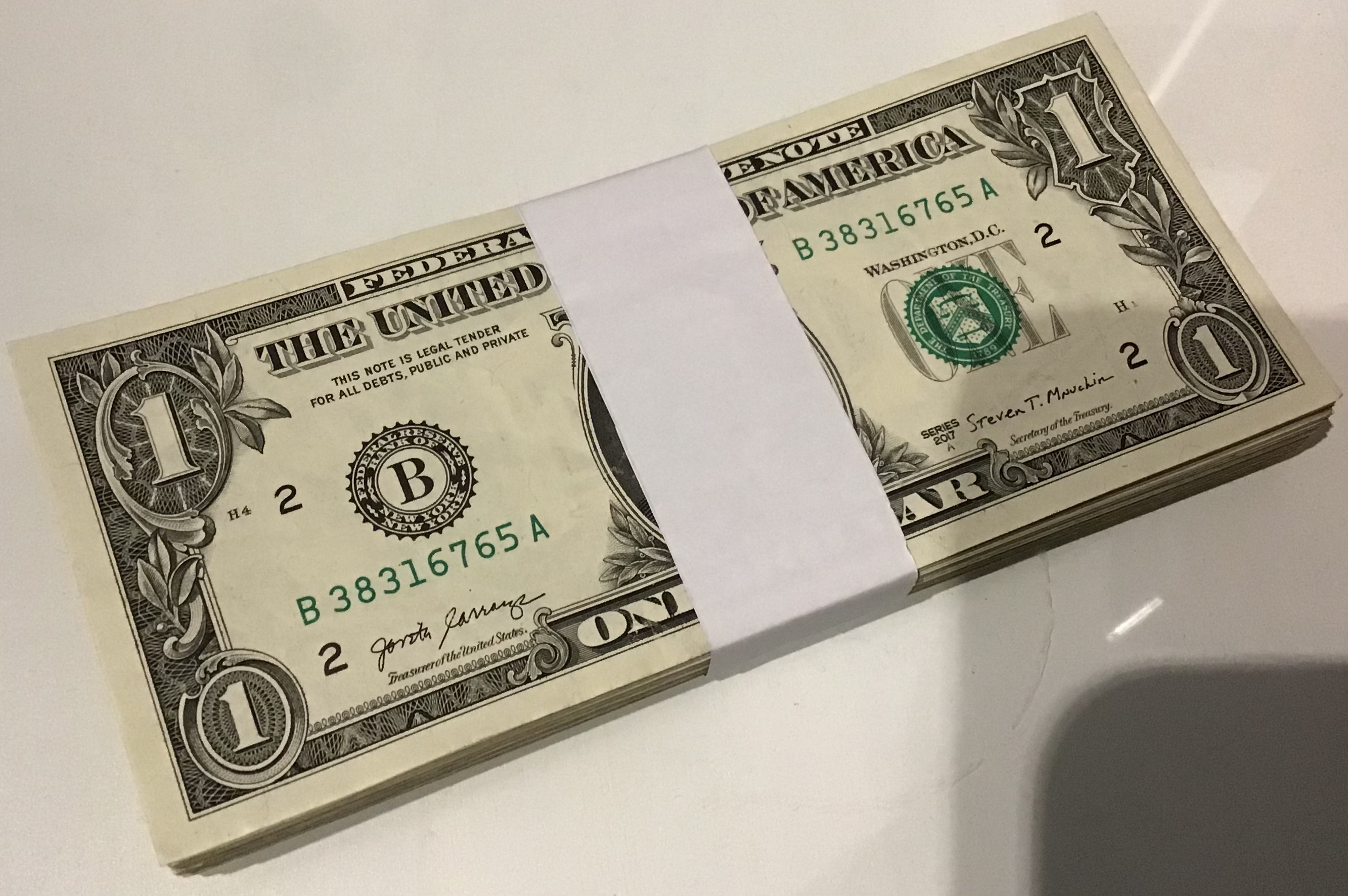
A simple homemade currency strap holding 80 $1 bills, made from a loop of paper secured with sellotape

Bundling money together with a simple elastic or paper device is as old as paper currency itself. However, measured and standardized straps are a relatively new idea. For example, until the mid-1970s, the U.S. Federal Reserve counted bills by hand. That is, they employed 55 currency counters whose job it was to count as well as, by touch and feel, authenticate bills. However, as the amount of currency in circulation increased, they found that they needed a more efficient way to count currency. To help the Currency Counting staff keep up, the Bank began strap-sorting the $1 to $20 notes. Straps were visually inspected and weighed against a counterweight equal to the paper mass of 100 genuine U.S. notes. Currency straps have even helped catch the culprits in bank robberies, like the Dunbar Armored Robbery in 1997, after one of the culprits decided to pay a real estate broker with a still-strapped bundle of notes.

== ABA Standard (United States) ==
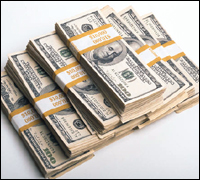
A stack of $100 Federal Reserve Notes in $10,000 straps. Note the ABA-compliant mustard color.

Strap Color	Bill Denomination	Bill Count	Strap Total Amount	Bundle Strap Color	Bundle Strap Count	Bundle Total Amount
Blue	$1	100	$100	Blue	10	$1,000
Green	$2	100	$200	Green	10	$2,000
Red	$5	100	$500	Red	10	$5,000
Yellow	$10	100	$1,000	Yellow	10	$10,000
Violet	$20	100	$2,000	Violet	10	$20,000
Brown	$50	100	$5,000	Brown	10	$50,000
Mustard	$100	100	$10,000	Mustard	10	$100,000

As shown in the table above, there are 100 bills in each strap, and 10 straps in each bundle.

== See also ==
- Currency packaging
- Currency-counting machine
