= Replacement banknote =

Banknote replacement

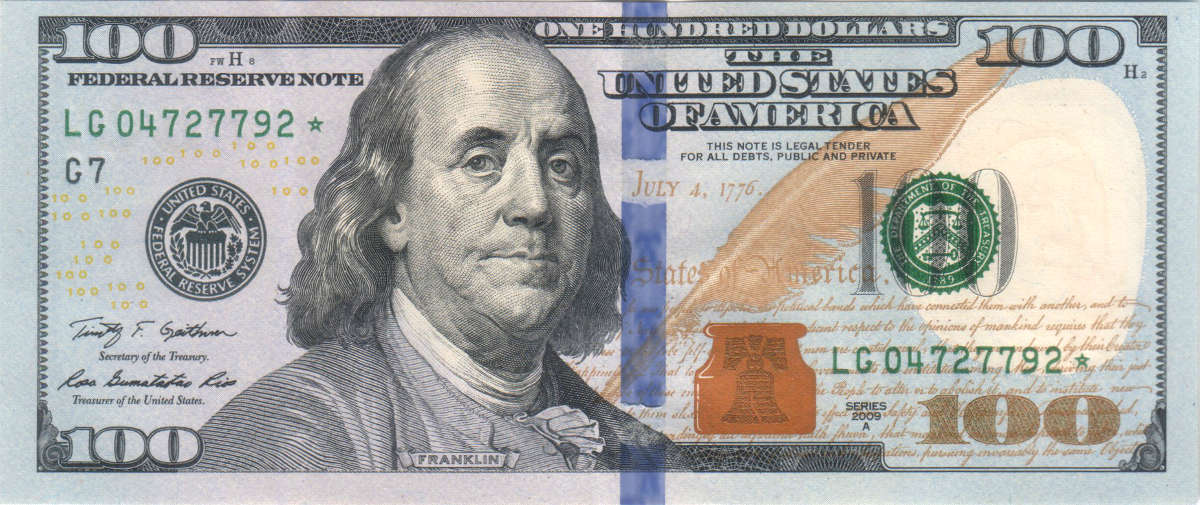
A $100 "star note". The star following the serial number indicates this is a replacement note for one that was misprinted or damaged in the printing process.

A replacement banknote, commonly referred to as a star note, is a banknote that is printed to replace a faulty one and is used as a control mechanism for governments or monetary authorities to know the exact number of banknotes being printed. Also, since no two serial numbers can be the same, the bill is simply reprinted with a symbol in the serial number, identifying it as a replacement for an error note. Replacement bills have different symbols to mark the error around the world, although the most popular examples are "star notes".

== Description ==
As quality control finds defective notes in the printing process after the serial number has been overprinted, they are taken out with their serial number written down and replaced with another banknote printed specifically for this purpose, so that the number of banknotes being printed stays the same in each production batch. This saves time and money compared to re-printing exactly the same serial number that was used before. It is rare that the replacement banknote has the same serial number as the original faulty one. A replacement note will have its own serial-numbering system that separates it from the normal numbering system. The star also appears on notes that have a serial number higher than 99,999,999 because the number machines cannot print over eight digits.

In the US, the Bureau of Engraving and Printing inspects currency for printing errors prior to releasing notes into general circulation. When notes are discovered that have been printed incorrectly (such as having the serial numbers upside down, etc.) the misprinted "error notes" are replaced with star notes because no two bills within a certain series can be produced with the same serial number (occasionally errors occur from the BEP, famously the series 2013 B prefix notes). They are used to maintain a correct count of notes in a serial number run. By their nature, star notes are more scarce than notes with standard serial numbers and as such are widely collected by notaphilists. Star notes are highly sought after by collectors and sold for a price exceeding their face value depending on how low the serial number is.

== Examples of marker by countries ==
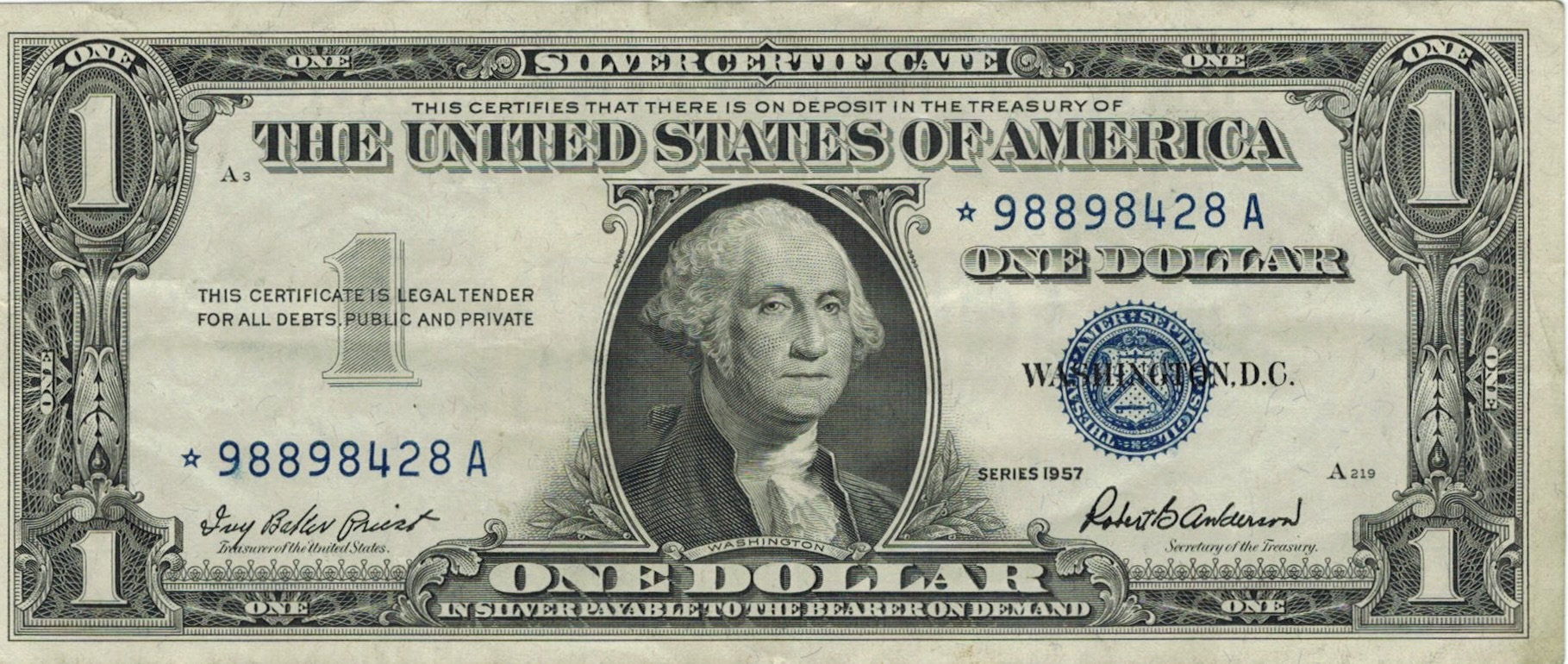
1957 one United States dollar star note (Star precedes serial number)

- The United States and India use "✫" in the serial number to mark a replacement banknote. These are known as "star notes". These were also used by Australia until 1972.
- Canada used "✽" at the beginning of serial numbers on its replacement banknotes until 1975. They are known as "asterisk notes". Some later issues use prefixes with "33" or "X" to mark replacement banknotes.
- Argentina uses "R" in the serial number to mark replacement banknotes.
- The Bahamas, Sri Lanka, Malaysia and Guatemala use "Z" in the serial number to mark replacement banknotes.
- Scotland, Hong Kong and Mongolia use "ZZ" in the serial number to mark replacement banknotes.
- Singapore uses "Z/0" in the serial number to mark replacement banknotes.
- Indonesia uses "X" in the serial number to mark replacement banknotes.
- Iraq and Kuwait use prefix "Letter/99" in the serial number to mark replacement banknotes.
- Zambia uses "X3" in the serial number to mark replacement polymer banknotes.
- Thailand uses "Sพ, 0Sพ,1Sพ,2Sพ ..." in the serial number to mark replacement polymer banknotes.
- Serbia uses "ZA" in the serial number to mark replacement banknotes.
- Nigeria uses "DZ" in the serial number to mark replacement banknotes.
- Egypt uses prefix numbers of 100, 200, 300, 400, etc.

Different countries may also have their own numbering or marking schemes. There is no guaranteed way to know the rarity of replacement banknotes as they are only introduced to replace defective ones. Some banknote collectors go after these rather unusual banknotes as their specialty. Both paper and polymer replacement notes exist as this control mechanism.
