= Series (United States currency) =

Year appearing on United States paper currency

On banknotes of the United States dollar, the series refers to the year appearing on the obverse of a bill, indicating when the bill's design was adopted. The series year does not indicate the exact date a bill was printed; instead, the year indicates the first year that bills of the same design were originally made. For example, $2 bills bearing the series year of 1928 were printed until the early 1950s.

== Before 1928 ==
The first U.S. banknotes with a series year were the United States Notes of 1869. Before that, paper currency was identified only by the act authorizing it, for example, the act of March 3, 1863. For these bills, the serial number uniquely identified the bill, except for some issues that exceeded one million bills. In that case, the sequence of serial numbers was restarted, and an extra overprint of 'Series 1' was added to the bill. When one million bills in 'Series 1' were printed, 'Series 2' was used, and so on. 'Series 187' is the highest series number of this sort that was used, on the United States Notes of 1863, in the $5 denomination.

Other notes were identified by the date of issue. Interest-bearing notes were carefully identified as to the date of an issue because they reached maturity a fixed amount of time later. Gold Certificates, issued upon the government receiving a deposit of gold, were dated by hand, and also the depositor was identified. Only the depositor could redeem an early gold certificate. Starting with the Series of 1882, Gold Certificates were made payable to the bearer.

National Bank Notes were given a date as well. However, this was not when the bill was first circulated, but rather when the bill was sent from the federal government to the issuing bank, which could then release it at its convenience. The national currency, issued and unissued, has a series date (corresponding to when the design was last changed) and a release date.

The first series printed by the Federal Reserve was Series 1914. It contained a $5 bill with Abraham Lincoln, a $10 bill with Andrew Jackson, a $20 bill with Grover Cleveland, a $50 bill with Ulysses Grant, and a $100 bill with Benjamin Franklin, all of which were large-size notes.

The next series was Series 1918, which contained large-size notes in denominations of the $500 bill with John Marshall, the $1,000 bill with Alexander Hamilton, the $5,000 bill with James Madison, and the $10,000 bill with Salmon Chase.

One-dollar bills featuring George Washington (which were all Silver Certificates) came in Series 1923, as did red seal United States notes in the ten dollar denomination and blue seal Silver Certificates in the five dollar denomination. Gold Certificates appeared in various series including 1905 and 1906 ($20 notes), 1907 ($10 notes), 1907 ($1000 notes), 1913 ($50 notes), and 1922 ($10, $20, $50, $100, $500, $1,000 notes).

== Since 1928 ==
Series 1928 was the first series of modern, small-sized notes issued. Since then, the series year has been changed when there is a major design change to a bill; a minor design change is indicated by a letter suffix being added to the series year. Major design changes were rare until 1974 when William E. Simon became Secretary of the Treasury. Before 1974, a change to either the signature of the Secretary of the Treasury or the Treasurer was considered a minor change; after 1974, a new Secretary of the Treasury was considered a major change. (The only exception to this was in 1979, G. William Miller's signature appeared on Series 1977A instead of Series 1979.) A change in Treasurer is still considered a minor change. The 2017A series was due to a minor change in production, possibly of the ink used. Changes in design, such as the recent changes to the $20 bill to deter counterfeiting, are still considered major changes.

Tate-Mellon: 1928 $1 Silver Certificate, 1928 $2 United States Note, 1928 $5, $10, and $20 Federal Reserve Notes.

Woods-Mellon: 1928 $10 Gold Certificate, 1928A $1 Silver Certificate, 1928A $2 United States Note, 1928 $5 United States Note, 1928A $5, $10, and $20 Federal Reserve Notes, 1928B $5, $10, and $20 Federal Reserve Notes, 1928 $50 and $100 Federal Reserve Notes, 1928A $50 and $100 Federal Reserve Notes.

Woods-Mills: 1928B $1 Silver Certificate, 1928B $2 United States Note, 1928A $5 United States Note, 1928C $5, $10, and $20 Federal Reserve Notes.

Woods-Woodin: 1928C $1 Silver Certificate, 1928 $1 United States Note, 1928D $5 Federal Reserve Note.

Julian-Woodin: 1928D $1 Silver Certificate, 1933 $10 Silver Certificate.

Julian-Morgenthau: 1928E $1 Silver Certificate, 1934 $1 Silver Certificate, 1935 $1 Silver Certificate, 1935A $1 Silver Certificate, 1934 $5 Silver Certificate, 1934A $5 Silver Certificate, 1933A $10 Silver Certificate, 1934 $10 Silver Certificate, 1934A $10 Silver Certificate, 1928C $2 United States Note, 1928D $2 United States Note, 1928B $5 United States Note, 1928C $5 United States Note, 1934 $5, $10, $20, $50, and $100 Federal Reserve Notes, 1934A $5, $10, $20, $50, and $100 Federal Reserve Notes.

Julian-Vinson: 1935B $1 Silver Certificate, 1934B $5 Silver Certificate, 1934B $10 Silver Certificate, 1928E $2 United States Note, 1928D $5 United States Note, 1934B $5, $10, $20, $50, and $100 Federal Reserve Notes.

Julian-Snyder: 1935C $1 Silver Certificate, 1934C $5 Silver Certificate, 1934C $10 Silver Certificate, 1928F $2 United States Note, 1928E $5 United States Note, 1934C $5, $10, $20, $50, and $100 Federal Reserve Notes.

Clark-Snyder: 1935D $1 Silver Certificate, 1934D $5 Silver Certificate, 1934D $10 Silver Certificate, 1928G $2 United States Note, 1928F $5 United States Note, 1934D $5, $10, $20, $50, and $100 Federal Reserve Notes, 1950 $5, $10, $20, $50, and $100 Federal Reserve Notes.

Priest-Humphrey: 1935E $1 Silver Certificate, 1953 $5 Silver Certificate, 1953 $10 Silver Certificate, 1953 $2 United States Note, 1953 $5 United States Note, 1950A $5, $10, $20, $50, and $100 Federal Reserve Notes.

Priest-Anderson: 1935F $1 Silver Certificate, 1957 $1 Silver Certificate, 1953A $5 Silver Certificate, 1953A $10 Silver Certificate, 1953A $2 United States Note, 1953A $5 United States Note, 1950B $5, $10, $20, $50, and $100 Federal Reserve Notes.

Smith-Dillon: 1935G $1 Silver Certificate, 1957A $1 Silver Certificate, 1953B $5 Silver Certificate, 1953B $10 Silver Certificate, 1953B $2 United States Note, 1953B $5 United States Note, 1950C $5, $10, $20, $50, and $100 Federal Reserve Notes.

Granahan-Dillon: 1935H $1 Silver Certificate, 1957B $1 Silver Certificate, 1953C $5 Silver Certificate, 1953C $2 United States Note, 1953C $5 United States Note, 1963 $2 United States Note, 1963 $5 United States Note, 1950D $5, $10, $20, $50, and $100 Federal Reserve Notes, 1963 $1, $5, $10, and $20 Federal Reserve Notes.

Granahan-Fowler: 1963A $2 United States Note, 1966 $100 United States Note, 1950E $5, $10, $20, $50, and $100 Federal Reserve Notes, 1963A $1, $5, $10, $20, $50, and $100 Federal Reserve Notes.

Granahan-Barr: 1963B $1 Federal Reserve Note.

Elston-Kennedy: 1966A $100 United States Note, 1969 $1, $5, $10, $20, $50, and $100 Federal Reserve Notes.

Kabis*-Kennedy: 1969A $1 Federal Reserve Note.

Kabis-Connally: 1969B $1 Federal Reserve Note, 1969A $5, $10, $20, $50, and $100 Federal Reserve Notes.

Bañuelos-Connally: 1969C $1 Federal Reserve Note, 1969B $5, $10, $20, $50, and $100 Federal Reserve Notes.

Bañuelos-Shultz: 1969D $1 Federal Reserve Note, 1969C $5, $10, $20, $50, and $100 Federal Reserve Notes.

Neff-Simon: 1974 $1, $5, $10, $20, $50, and $100 Federal Reserve Notes, 1976 $2 Federal Reserve Note.

Morton-Blumenthal: 1977 $1, $5, $10, $20, $50, and $100 Federal Reserve Notes.

Morton-Miller: 1977A $1, $5, and $10 Federal Reserve Notes.

Buchanan-Regan: 1981 $1, $5, $10, $20, $50, and $100 Federal Reserve Notes.

Ortega-Regan: 1981A $1, $5, $10, $20, $50, and $100 Federal Reserve Notes.

Ortega-Baker: 1985 $1, $5, $10, $20, $50, and $100 Federal Reserve Notes.

Ortega-Brady: 1988 $1, $5, $50, and $100 Federal Reserve Notes.

Villalpando-Brady: 1988A $1, $5, $10, and $20 Federal Reserve Notes, 1990 $10, $20, $50, and $100 Federal Reserve Notes.

Withrow-Bentsen: 1993 $1, $5, $10, $20, $50, and $100 Federal Reserve Notes.

Withrow-Rubin: 1995 $1, $2, $5, $10, and $20 Federal Reserve Notes, 1996 $20, $50, and $100 Federal Reserve Notes.

Withrow-Summers: 1999 $1, $5, $10, $20, and $100 Federal Reserve Notes.

Marin-O'Neill: 2001 $1, $5, $10, $20, $50, and $100 Federal Reserve Notes.

Marin-Snow: 2003 $1, $2, $5, $10, and $100 Federal Reserve Notes, 2004 $20 and $50 Federal Reserve Notes.

Cabral-Snow: 2003A $1, $2, $5, and $100 Federal Reserve Notes, 2004A $10, $20, and $50 Federal Reserve Notes.

Cabral-Paulson: 2006 $1, $5, $5**, $10, $20, $50, and $100 Federal Reserve Notes, 2006A $100 Federal Reserve Note***.

Rios-Geithner: 2009 $1, $2, $5, $10, $20, $50, and $100*** Federal Reserve Notes, 2009A $100*** Federal Reserve Note.

Rios-Lew: 2013 $1, $2, $5, $10, $20, $50, $100 Federal Reserve Notes.

Carranza-Mnuchin: 2017 $1, $10, $20 Federal Reserve Notes, 2017A $1, $2, $5, $10, $20, $50 and $100 Federal Reserve Notes.

Malerba-Yellen: 2021 $1, $2, $5, $10, $20, $50 and $100 Federal Reserve Notes.

*When Dorothy Kabis became Treasurer, she was named Dorothy Andrews Elston. Later during her term, she married and changed her signature accordingly, but the signature combination only lasted five months before David M. Kennedy would resign.

**The first printing of 2006 $5 notes (approximately 409 million notes) used the 1996-generation designs. After rumors surfaced that people were bleaching $5 bills to make them resemble $100 bills, the note's design was changed as an afterthought and over 2.1 billion bills were produced with the new 2004-generation designs.

***Originally series 2009 $100 notes were scheduled to be released in February 2011 but were delayed because of major printing problems. However, due to intense demand for $100 bills from banks, Series 2006A (with the same Cabral-Paulson signatures as series 2006 notes) was printed, using the series 1996 design instead of the new 2009 design. The redesigned $100 note was finally issued in October 2013 as series 2009A, not series 2009 as the defective notes were dated. The 2009 series notes were sorted and the defective notes were destroyed. Notes found to be acceptable were eventually issued from early 2016. Both series of 2009 and 2009A notes bear the same Rios-Geithner signatures.
