= Silver certificate =

Certificate of monetary ownership worth in silver

A silver certificate is a certificate of ownership that silver owners hold instead of storing the actual silver. Several countries have issued silver certificates, including Cuba, the Netherlands, and the United States. Silver certificates have also been privately issued by various mints and bullion companies. One example was the Liberty Dollar issued by NORFED from 1998 to 2009.

== Cuba ==
Cuban silver certificates were issued between 1934 and 1949 (and circulated from 1935 to the early 1950s). Prior and subsequent issues of Cuban banknotes were engraved and printed by private bank note companies in the United States, but the series from 1934 to 1949 were designed, engraved, and printed by the US at the Bureau of Engraving and Printing (BEP).

The first Cuban banknotes were issued in 1857 for El Banco Español De La Habana. (Note: In denominations of 50, 100, 300, 500, and 1,000 pesos.) Beginning in the late 1860s, Cuba contracted the National Bank Note Company (NBNC) for two issues of banknotes in 1869 and 1872. After absorbing NBNC, the American Bank Note Company (ABNC) engraved and printed Cuban banknotes for issues in 1889, 1896, 1897, 1905 for the National Bank of Cuba, 1944, and a 1949–50 issue for the Banco Nacional De Cuba (printed until 1960). Between 1905 and the introduction of BEP issued Cuban silver certificates in 1934, no banknotes were produced.

== Netherlands ==
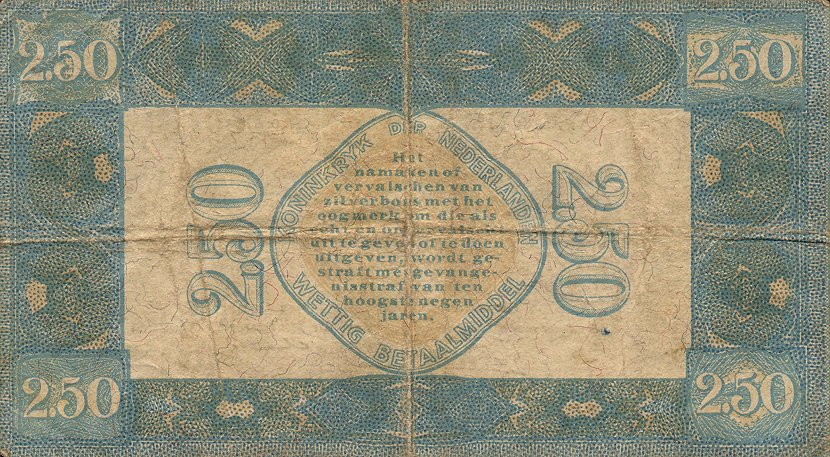
Dutch 2.50 guilder silver certificate from 1927.

In 1914, because of silver shortage for minting, the Dutch government introduced silver certificates (zilverbonnen) for 1, 2½ and 5 guilder. Although the 5 guilder were only issued that year, the 1 guilder notes continued until 1920 and the 2½ guilder until 1927. In 1926, the Netherlands Bank introduced 20 guilder notes, followed by 50 guilder in 1929 and 500 guilder in 1930. These introductions followed the cessation of production of the unusual 40, 60 and 300 guilder notes during the 1920s. In 1938, silver notes were reintroduced for 1 and 2½ guilders.

== United States ==
Silver certificates were issued between 1878 and 1964 in the United States as part of its circulation of paper currency. They were produced in response to silver agitation by citizens who were angered by the Fourth Coinage Act, which had effectively placed the United States on a gold standard. The certificates were initially redeemable for their face value of silver dollar coins and later (for one year – 24 June 1967 to 24 June 1968) in raw silver bullion. Since 1968, they have been redeemable only in Federal Reserve Notes and are thus obsolete, but still valid legal tender at their face value.

Large-size silver certificates (1878 to 1923) (Note: Large size notes represent the earlier types or series of U.S. banknotes. Their "average" dimension is 7.375 × 3.125 inches (187 × 79 mm). Small size notes (described as such due to their size relative to the earlier large size notes) are an "average" 6.125 × 2.625 inches (156 × 67 mm), the size of modern U.S. currency. "Each measurement is +/- 0.08 inches (2mm) to account for margins and cutting".) were issued initially in denominations from $10 to $1,000 (in 1878 and 1880), and in 1886, the $1, $2, and $5 were authorized. In 1928, all United States bank notes were re-designed and the size reduced. The small-size silver certificate (1928–1964) was only issued in denominations of $1, $5, and $10.

== See also ==
- Silver standard
- 銀円券

== Bibliography ==
- Blake, George Herbert (1908). United States paper money. George H. Blake.
- Friedberg, Arthur L.; Friedberg, Ira S. (2013). Paper Money of the United States: A Complete Illustrated Guide With Valuations (20th ed.). Coin & Currency Institute. ISBN 978-0-87184-520-7.
- Knox, John Jay (1888). United States Notes: A history of the various issues of paper money by the government of the United States (3rd ed.). Charles Scribner's Sons.
- Leavens, Dickson H. (1939). Silver Money. Principia Press, Inc.
- Shafer, Neil (2001). "1934–1949 Silver Certificates of Cuba Made by the U.S. BEP". Paper Money. 40 (5). www.spmc.org: 298–307.
