= Electoral history of Richard Nixon =

Elections featuring President of the US

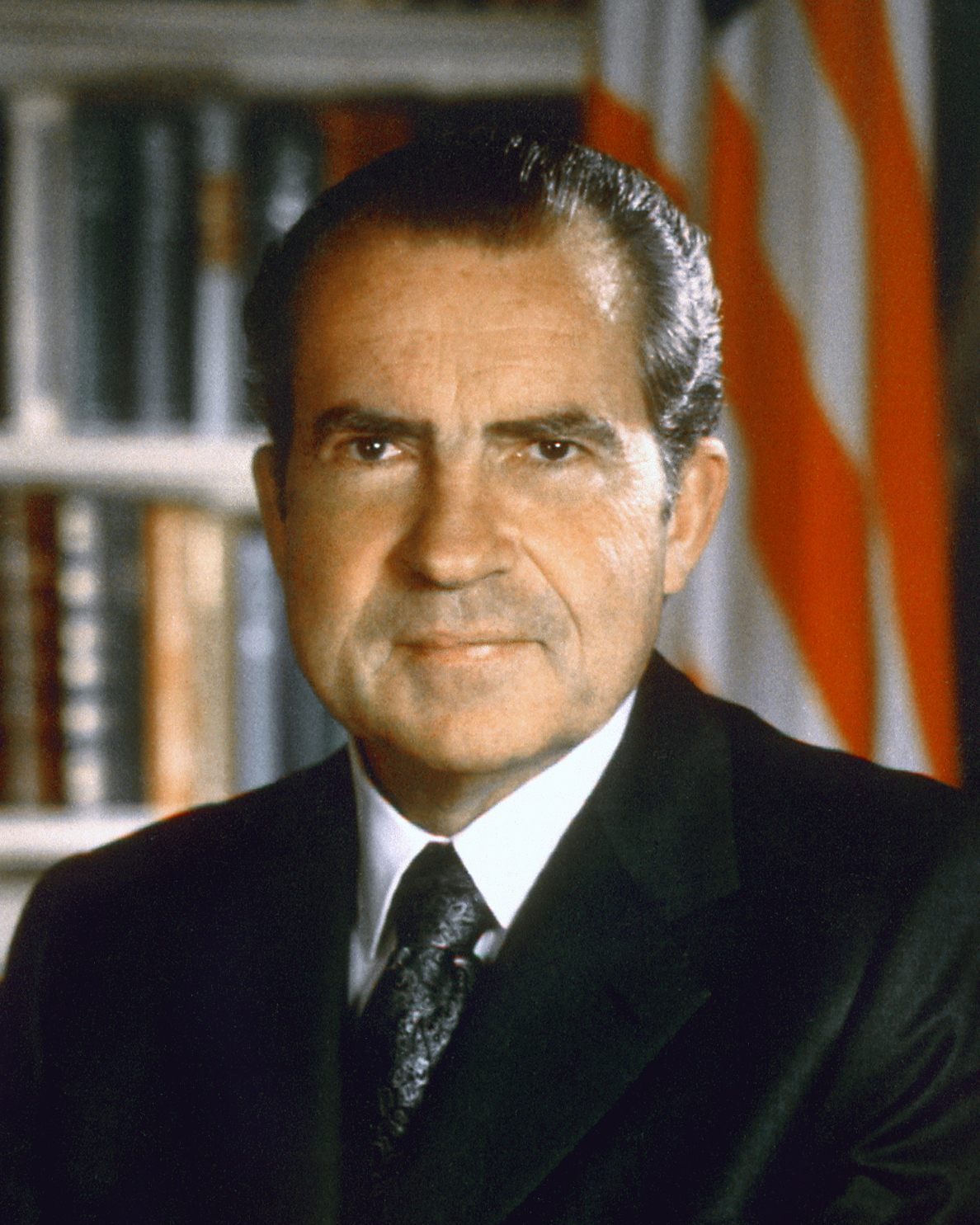
Nixon in 1971

Richard Nixon served as the 37th president of the United States from 1969 to 1974. He previously served as the 36th vice president of the United States from 1953 to 1961, and as a United States senator from 1950 to 1953 and United States representative from 1947 to 1950.

== U.S. Congressional Elections (1946-1950) ==
=== U.S. House Elections (1946, 1948) ===
==== 1946 ====
Republican Primary, California's 12th congressional district election, 1946
Party	Candidate	Votes	%
Republican	Richard Nixon	24,397	64.11
Democratic	Jerry Voorhis (incumbent)	12,125	31.86
Republican	William Kinnett	1,532	4.03

California's 12th congressional district election, 1946
Party	Candidate	Votes	%
Republican	Richard Nixon	65,586	56.03
Democratic	Jerry Voorhis (incumbent)	49,994	42.71
Prohibition	John Hoeppel	1,476	1.26

==== 1948 ====
Democratic Primary, California's 12th congressional district election, 1948
Party	Candidate	Votes	%
Republican	Richard Nixon (incumbent)	21,411	52.23
Democratic	Stephen Zetterberg	16,808	41.01
Democratic	Margaret Cooper	2,772	6.76

Nixon ran unopposed in and won the 1948 Republican primary.

California's 12th congressional district election, 1948
Party	Candidate	Votes	%
Republican	Richard Nixon (incumbent)	141,509	86.92
Progressive	Una Rice	19,631	12.06
Independent	Scattering	1,667	1.02

=== U.S. Senate Election (1950) ===
United States Senate election in California, 1950 Democratic Primary
Party	Candidate	Votes	%
Democratic	Helen Gahagan Douglas	734,842	47
Democratic	Manchester Boddy	379,077	24.2
Democratic	Richard Nixon	318,840	20.4
Democratic	Earl Desmond	96,752	6.2
Democratic	Ulysses Meyer	34,707	2.2

United States Senate election in California, 1950 Republican Primary
Party	Candidate	Votes	%
Republican	Richard Nixon	740,465	64.6
Republican	Manchester Boddy	156,884	13.7
Republican	Helen Gahagan Douglas	153,788	13.4
Republican	Earl Desmond	60,613	5.3
Republican	Ulysses Meyer	18,783	1.6
Republican	Albert Levitt	15,929	1.4

United States Senate election in California, 1950
Party	Candidate	Votes	%
Republican	Richard Nixon	2,183,454	59.2
Democratic	Helen Gahagan Douglas	1,502,507	40.8

1950 California Senate election results by county: Nixon: 50–60% 60–70% 70–80% Douglas: 50–60%

== Presidential Elections (Pre-1962) ==
=== 1952 U.S. Presidential Election ===
1952 Republican National Convention (Vice Presidential tally):

- Richard Nixon - 1,206 (100.00%)

1952 United States Presidential Election Results:

Electoral results
Presidential candidate	Party	Home state	Popular vote		Electoral vote	Running mate		
Presidential candidate	Party	Home state	Count	Percentage	Electoral vote	Vice-presidential candidate	Home state	Electoral vote
Dwight David Eisenhower	Republican	New York	34,075,529	55.2%	442	Richard Milhous Nixon	California	442
Adlai Ewing Stevenson II	Democratic	Illinois	27,375,090	44.3%	89	John Jackson Sparkman	Alabama	89
Vincent Hallinan	Progressive	California	140,746	0.2%	0	Charlotta Bass	New York	0
Stuart Hamblen	Prohibition	Texas	73,412	0.1%	0	Enoch Holtwick	Illinois	0
Douglas MacArthur	Constitution	Arkansas	17,205	0.0%	0	Harry Byrd	Virginia	0
Other			87,165	0.1%	—	Other		—
Total			61,769,147	100%	531			531
Needed to win					266			266

Source (Popular Vote): Leip, David. "1952 Presidential Election Results". Dave Leip's Atlas of U.S. Presidential Elections.Source (Electoral Vote): "Electoral College Box Scores 1789–1996". National Archives and Records Administration.

1952 electoral vote results

=== 1956 U.S. Presidential Election ===
1956 Republican Presidential Primaries:

- Dwight Eisenhower - 5,008,132 (85.93%)
- John W. Bricker - 478,453 (8.21%)
- Unpledged - 115,014 (1.97%)
- William F. Knowland - 84,446 (1.45%)
- Joe Foss - 59,374 (1.02%)
- S.C. Arnold - 32,732 (0.56%)
- Others* - 50,283 (0.86%)

*Nixon was a write-in candidate in some states' presidential primaries and received 316 votes.

1956 Republican National Convention (Vice Presidential tally):

- Richard Nixon (inc.) - 1,323 (100.00%)

1956 United States Presidential Election Results:

Electoral results
Presidential candidate	Party	Home state	Popular vote		Electoral vote	Running mate		
Presidential candidate	Party	Home state	Count	Percentage	Electoral vote	Vice-presidential candidate	Home state	Electoral vote
Dwight David Eisenhower (incumbent)	Republican	Pennsylvania	35,579,180	57.4%	457	Richard Milhous Nixon (incumbent)	California	457
Adlai Ewing Stevenson II	Democratic	Illinois	26,028,028	42.0%	73	(Carey) Estes Kefauver	Tennessee	73
Walter Burgwyn Jones	Democratic	Alabama	—^{(a)}	—^{(a)}	1	Herman Talmadge	Georgia	1
(unpledged electors)	(n/a)	(n/a)	196,145	0.3%	0	(n/a)	(n/a)	0
T. Coleman Andrews	States' Rights	Virginia	107,929	0.2%	0	Thomas Werdel	California	0
Other			110,046	0.2%	—	Other		—
Total			62,021,328	100%	531			531
Needed to win					266			266

Source (Popular Vote): Leip, David. "1956 Presidential Election Results". Dave Leip's Atlas of U.S. Presidential Elections.Source (Electoral Vote): "Electoral College Box Scores 1789–1996". National Archives and Records Administration.

1956 electoral vote results

=== 1960 U.S. Presidential Election ===
1960 Republican Presidential Primaries:

- Richard Nixon - 4,975,938 (86.63%)
- Unpledged - 314,234 (5.47%)
- George H. Bender - 211,090 (3.68%)
- Cecil H. Underwood - 123,756 (2.16%)
- James L. Lloyd - 48,461 (0.84%)
- Nelson Rockefeller - 30,639 (0.53%)
- Frank R. Beckwith - 19,677 (0.34%)
- John F. Kennedy - 12,817 (0.22%)
- Barry Goldwater - 3,146 (0.06%)
- Paul C. Fisher - 2,388 (0.04%)
- Adlai Stevenson - 694 (0.01%)
- Henry Cabot Lodge Jr. - 514 (0.01%)
- Dwight D. Eisenhower (write-in) - 172 (0.00%)
- Styles Bridges - 108 (0.00%)

1960 Republican National Convention (Presidential tally):

- Richard Nixon - 1,321 (99.25%)
- Barry Goldwater - 10 (0.75%)

1960 United States Presidential Election Results

Electoral results
Presidential candidate	Party	Home state	Popular vote		Electoral vote	Running mate		
Presidential candidate	Party	Home state	Count	Percentage	Electoral vote	Vice-presidential candidate	Home state	Electoral vote
John Fitzgerald Kennedy	Democratic	Massachusetts	34,220,984^{(a)}	49.7%	303	Lyndon Baines Johnson	Texas	303
Richard Milhous Nixon	Republican	California	34,108,157	49.6%	219	Henry Cabot Lodge Jr.	Massachusetts	219
Harry Flood Byrd	(none)	Virginia	—^{(b)}	—^{(b)}	15	James Strom Thurmond	South Carolina	14
Harry Flood Byrd	(none)	Virginia	—^{(b)}	—^{(b)}	15	Barry Morris Goldwater^{(c)}	Arizona	1^{(c)}
(unpledged electors)	Democratic	(n/a)	286,359	0.4%	—^{(d)}	(n/a)	(n/a)	—^{(d)}
Orval Faubus	States' Rights	Arkansas	44,984	0.1%	0	John G. Crommelin	Alabama	0
Charles Sullivan	Constitution	Mississippi	(TX) 18,162	0.0%	0	Merritt Curtis	California	0
Other			216,982	0.3%	—	Other		—
Total			68,895,628	100%	537			537
Needed to win					269			269

There were 537 electoral votes, up from 531 in 1956, because of the addition of 2 U.S. Senators and 1 U.S. Representative from each of the new states of Alaska and Hawaii. (The House of Representatives was temporarily expanded from 435 members to 437 to accommodate this, and would go back to 435 when reapportioned according to the 1960 census.) Source (Popular Vote):Leip, David. "1960 Presidential Election Results". Dave Leip's Atlas of U.S. Presidential Elections.Note: Sullivan / Curtis ran only in Texas. In Washington, Constitution Party ran Curtis for President and B. N. Miller for vice-president, receiving 1,401 votes. Source (Electoral Vote): "Electoral College Box Scores 1789–1996". National Archives and Records Administration.^{(a)} This figure is problematic; see Alabama popular vote above.
^{(b)} Byrd was not directly on the ballot. Instead, his electoral votes came from unpledged Democratic electors and a faithless elector.
^{(c)} Oklahoma faithless elector Henry D. Irwin, though pledged to vote for Richard Nixon and Henry Cabot Lodge Jr., instead voted for non-candidate Harry F. Byrd. However, unlike other electors who voted for Byrd and Strom Thurmond as Vice President, Irwin voted for Barry Goldwater as Vice President.

^{(d)} In Mississippi, the slate of unpledged Democratic electors won. They cast their 8 votes for Byrd and Thurmond.

1960 electoral vote results

== California Gubernatorial Election (1962) ==
1962 Gubernatorial Election, California
Party	Candidate	Votes	%
Democratic	Pat Brown (incumbent)	3,037,109	51.92
Republican	Richard Nixon	2,740,351	46.85
Prohibition	Robert L. Wyckoff	69,700	1.12
Total votes		5,929,602	100.00

1962 California Gubernatorial election results by county: Brown: 40-50% 50–60% 60–70% Nixon: 40–50% 50–60% 60–70%

== Presidential Elections (Post-1962) ==
=== 1964 U.S. Presidential Election ===
1964 Republican Presidential Primaries:

- Barry Goldwater - 2,267,079 (38.33%)
- Nelson Rockefeller - 1,304,204 (22.05%)
- James A. Rhodes - 615,754 (10.41%)
- Henry Cabot Lodge Jr. - 386,661 (6.54%)
- John W. Byrnes - 299,612 (5.07%)
- William Scranton - 245,401 (4.15%)
- Margaret Chase Smith - 227,007 (3.84%)
- Richard Nixon - 197,212 (3.33%)
- Unpledged - 173,652 (2.94%)
- Harold Stassen - 114,083 (1.93%)

=== 1968 U.S. Presidential Election ===
1968 Republican Presidential Primaries:

- Ronald Reagan - 1,696,632 (37.93%)
- Richard Nixon - 1,679,443 (37.54%)
- James A. Rhodes - 614,492 (13.74%)
- Nelson A. Rockefeller - 164,340 (3.67%)
- Unpledged - 140,639 (3.14%)
- Eugene McCarthy (write-in) - 44,520 (1.00%)
- Harold Stassen - 31,655 (0.71%)
- John Volpe - 31,465 (0.70%)
- Others - 21,456 (0.51%)
- George Wallace (write-in) - 15,291 (0.34%)
- Robert F. Kennedy (write-in) - 14,524 (0.33%)
- Hubert Humphrey (write-in) - 5,698 (0.13)
- Lyndon Johnson (write-in) - 4,824 (0.11%)
- George Romney - 4,447 (0.10%)
- Raymond P. Shafer - 1,223 (0.03%)
- William W. Scranton - 724 (0.02%)
- Charles H. Percy - 689 (0.02%)
- Barry M. Goldwater - 598 (0.01%)
- John V. Lindsay - 591 (0.01%)

1968 Republican National Convention (Presidential tally):

- First ballot:
  - Richard Nixon - 692
  - Nelson Rockefeller - 277
  - Ronald Reagan - 182
  - James A. Rhodes - 55
  - George Romney - 50
  - Clifford Case - 22
  - Frank Carlson - 20
  - Winthrop Rockefeller - 18
  - Hiram Fong - 14
  - Harold Stassen - 2
  - John V. Lindsay - 1
- Second ballot:
  - Richard Nixon - 1238
  - Nelson Rockefeller - 93
  - Ronald Reagan - 2

1968 United States Presidential Election Results:

Electoral results
Presidential candidate	Party	Home state	Popular vote		Electoral vote	Running mate		
Presidential candidate	Party	Home state	Count	Percentage	Electoral vote	Vice-presidential candidate	Home state	Electoral vote
Richard Milhous Nixon	Republican	New York	31,783,783	43.4%	301	Spiro Theodore Agnew	Maryland	301
Hubert Horatio Humphrey	Democratic	Minnesota	31,271,839	42.7%	191	Edmund Sixtus Muskie	Maine	191
George Corley Wallace	American Independent	Alabama	9,901,118	13.5%	46	Curtis Emerson LeMay	California	46
Eugene McCarthy	Independent	Minnesota	25,634	0.0%	0	(None)		0
Other			243,258	0.3%	—	Other		—
Total			73,199,998	100%	538			538
Needed to win					270			270

Source (Popular Vote): Leip, David. "1968 Presidential Election Results". Dave Leip's Atlas of U.S. Presidential Elections.

Source (Electoral Vote): "Electoral College Box Scores 1789–1996". National Archives and Records Administration.

1968 electoral vote results

=== 1972 U.S. Presidential Election ===
1972 Republican Presidential Primaries:

- Richard Nixon (inc.) - 5,378,704 (86.92%)
- Unpledged - 317,048 (5.12%)
- John M. Ashbrook - 311,543 (5.03%)
- Pete McCloskey - 132,731 (2.15%)
- George Wallace - 20,907 (0.34%)
- None of the names shown - 8,916 (0.14%)

1972 Republican National Convention (Presidential tally):

- Richard Nixon (inc.) - 1,347 (99.93%)
- Pete McCloskey - 1 (0.07%)

New York Conservative Party Presidential Convention, 1972:

- Richard Nixon (inc.) - 156 (69.96%)
- John G. Schmitz - 38 (17.04%)
- Abstaining - 29 (13.00%)

1972 United States Presidential Election Results:

Electoral results
Presidential candidate	Party	Home state	Popular vote		Electoral vote	Running mate		
Presidential candidate	Party	Home state	Count	Percentage	Electoral vote	Vice-presidential candidate	Home state	Electoral vote
Richard Milhous Nixon (incumbent)	Republican	California	47,168,710	60.7%	520	Spiro Theodore Agnew (incumbent)	Maryland	520
George Stanley McGovern	Democratic	South Dakota	29,173,222	37.5%	17	Robert Sargent Shriver	Maryland	17
John G. Hospers	Libertarian	California	3,674	0.0%	1^{(a)}	Theodora Nathan	Oregon	1^{(a)}
John G. Schmitz	American Independent	California	1,100,868	1.4%	0	Thomas J. Anderson	Tennessee	0
Linda Jenness	Socialist Workers	Georgia	83,380^{(b)}	0.1%	0	Andrew Pulley	Illinois	0
Benjamin Spock	People's	California	78,759	0.1%	0	Julius Hobson	District of Columbia	0
Other			135,414	0.2%	—	Other		—
Total			77,744,027	100%	538			538
Needed to win					270			270

Source (Popular Vote): Leip, David. "1972 Presidential Election Results". Dave Leip's Atlas of U.S. Presidential Elections. Source (Electoral Vote): "Electoral College Box Scores 1789–1996". National Archives and Records Administration. ^{(a)}A Virginia faithless elector, Roger MacBride, though pledged to vote for Richard Nixon and Spiro Agnew, instead voted for Libertarian candidates John Hospers and Theodora Nathan.

^{(b)}In Arizona, Pima and Yavapai counties had a ballot malfunction that counted many votes for both a major party candidate and Linda Jenness of the Socialist Workers Party. A court ordered that the ballots be counted for both. As a consequence, Jenness received 16% and 8% of the vote in Pima and Yavapai, respectively. 30,579 of her 30,945 Arizona votes are from those two counties. Some sources do not count these votes for Jenness.

1972 electoral vote results
