= Elicio =

Elicio is a male Spanish given name. Notable people with the name include:

- Elicio Argüelles Pozo (1885–1959), Cuban senator
  - Elicio Argüelles Menocal (1910–1988), his son
- Elicio Berriz (1820–1890), Spanish soldier and Mayor of Ponce, Puerto Rico
