= Rosario Kennedy =

American politician and lobbyist

Member of the Miami City Commission from the 4th district
- In office 1985–1989
- Preceded by: Demetrio Perez Jr.

Vice Mayor of Miami
- In office 1988
- Mayor: Xavier Suarez
- Preceded by: J. L. Plummer
- Succeeded by: Victor De Yurre

Personal details
- Born: 1945 (age 80–81) Havana
- Spouses: Gustavo Godoy Andrews; David T. Kennedy

Rosario Arguelles y Freyre de Andrade (Rosario Kennedy) is a Cuban American politician, lawyer, advocate, and special interest lobbyist. She was the first Cuban American woman to hold any elected office in the city of Miami. She was the former Vice Mayor of the City of Miami and candidate for Florida's 18th congressional district in the 1989 special election to replace Claude Pepper that was eventually won by Ileana Ros-Lehtinen. Currently, she is a lobbyist representing special interests in Miami, and a member of the law firm "Rosario Kennedy and Associates." In her government consulting, she claims to have "insider knowledge of the city of Miami and Miami-Dade County."

In 1997, Kennedy was involved in a situation in Miami known as "Stallone Gate," because her client was Sylvester Stallone.

In 2007, Kennedy's business paid Carey-Schuler $75,000. This money came from Kennedy's involvement in a proposed luxury condominium that was never built, and was the subject of a criminal investigation by the state attorney's office.

Recently, Kennedy's firm represented the residents of Grove Isle in fighting the development of a new condominium, but they were unsuccessful, and now the condominium complex occupies most of the real estate on the small island.

== Biography ==
Rosario Kennedy is from a high-class Cuban family. She is the granddaughter of Elicio Argüelles Pozo, President of the Cuban Senate, and the daughter of Elicio Argüelles Menocal, the last elected senator of Cuba before the Cuban Revolution. Her great-uncle, Mario Garcia Menocal, was President of Cuba, and she counts three uncles and cousins as former Mayors of Havana.

In 1960, Rosario Kennedy fled Cuba with her family to escape the Communist incursion into Cuba led by Fidel Castro. She arrived in Miami and through a scholarship, and attended the Convent of the Sacred Heart in Greenwich, Connecticut.

Subsequently, she married Gustavo Godoy Andrews, who would become news director at WLTV-Channel 23 in Miami. They had three children. By the time she was 25, Kennedy was divorced.

She then became a real estate agent.

On November 4, 1978, Kennedy married former City of Miami Mayor David T. Kennedy, who had been a main strategist for her political campaign.

In 1985, Governor Bob Graham appointed her to the Hospital Cost Containment Board, which has regulatory authority over hospitals' budgets, and was elected chairperson by her peers. She founded the South Florida Women's Chamber of Commerce and chaired the Little Havana Activities and Nutrition Center. She created "United Against Crime", an organization that purchased non-budgeted items for the Police Department.

She then ran for the City of Miami Commission against the incumbent, Demetrio Perez. She won that election and was later elected by her peers on the commission as Vice Mayor of Miami.

In 1987, Rosario and David Kennedy divorced.

In 1989, after the death of Claude Pepper, Kennedy resigned her commission seat to run for the Florida's 18th Congressional seat. She lost in the Democratic primary to Gerald Richman, who would eventually lose to Ileana Ros-Lehtinen.

== Other sources ==
- The Miami Herald; Kennedy Saga: Old (and New) Wives' Tale; July 3, 1989
- The Miami Herald; Kennedy to Assist Ex-Wife; March 20, 1989
- The Miami Herald; Miami Mayor Vote Won't Be In Back Room; June 12, 1996
