= Democrats for Nixon =

1972 Democratic support for Nixon campaign

- Nickname: Nixon Democrats
- Formation: 1972; 54 years ago
- Founder: John Connally
- Dissolved: 1972
- Type: Political organisation
- Key people: John Connally; Beverly Briley; C. Farris Bryant; Thomas G. Dunn; John F. Collins; Mills Godwin; David T. Kennedy
- Affiliations: Richard Nixon 1972 presidential campaign

Democrats for Nixon was a campaign to promote Democratic support for the then-incumbent Republican president Richard Nixon in the 1972 United States presidential election. The campaign was led by former Texas governor John Connally, a Democrat who was serving as United States secretary of the treasury at the time.

== Earlier efforts ==
There were earlier "Democrats for Nixon" groups, such as those formed during his re-election campaign for Congress in 1948.

His initial presidential campaign in 1960 had Democrats for Nixon groups in such states as Texas and Virginia, all part of an effort to reach disaffected conservative Democrats in the Southern United States. However, these groups were significantly smaller and more localized. For instance, in Virginia, where the Byrd Organization opposed John F. Kennedy as the Democratic nominee.

== 1972 campaign ==
John Connally, a Democrat who had been Governor of Texas and United States Secretary of the Navy under John F. Kennedy, formally announced the formation of the organization in August 1972. Polling cited by Connally indicated that as many as 20 million Democrats would cross over to vote for Nixon and invited "all those millions of Democrats who realize that in this Presidential election President Nixon is simply the better choice". Connally stated that he was troubled by Senator George McGovern's campaign and felt that the Democratic Party "is becoming an ideological machine closed to millions who have been the party's most loyal and steadfast members" under McGovern's leadership. The committee included Mayor Beverly Briley of Nashville, Tennessee; former Governor of Florida C. Farris Bryant; Mayor of Boston John F. Collins; Mayor Thomas G. Dunn of Elizabeth, New Jersey; Teamsters president Frank Fitzsimmons; Governor of Virginia Mills Godwin; Mayor of Miami David T. Kennedy; and former head of the United States Information Agency Leonard Marks. A fundraising target of as much as $3 million was set for the organization. Connally also announced that Jeno Paulucci, a frozen food distributor who had been closely involved as a fundraiser for Hubert Humphrey in his presidential bids, would serve as head of a group encouraging independent voters to choose Nixon.

A pair of independent surveys released in the last half of August 1972, by Gallup Poll and by Daniel Yankelovich, showed that as many as 40% of Democrats would vote for Nixon if the election were held then, while a far smaller percentage of Republicans were considering to cross party lies to vote for McGovern.

In a September 1972 article in The New York Times, Connally was quoted as saying that increasing numbers of traditionally Democratic voters were leaving the fold because they "are afraid of George McGovern" because of his proposals for major cutbacks in defense spending and in the number of U.S. troops serving in Europe. Connally insisted that "it is in the best interests of this country that the president be re-elected this year".

Democrats for Nixon raised $2.4 million for the Nixon campaign. The Nixon campaign created advertisements credited to Democrats for Nixon that stated that McGovern would grant welfare benefits to nearly half of all Americans, as part of an effort to alienate Democratic voters from a McGovern who was being presented as too liberal for many within his party.

== See also ==
- Conservative Democrat
- Democratic and liberal support for John McCain in 2008
- Neoconservatism
- Party switching in the United States
- Reagan Democrat
