= Sacred Heart Greenwich =

Catholic school in Greenwich, Connecticut, US

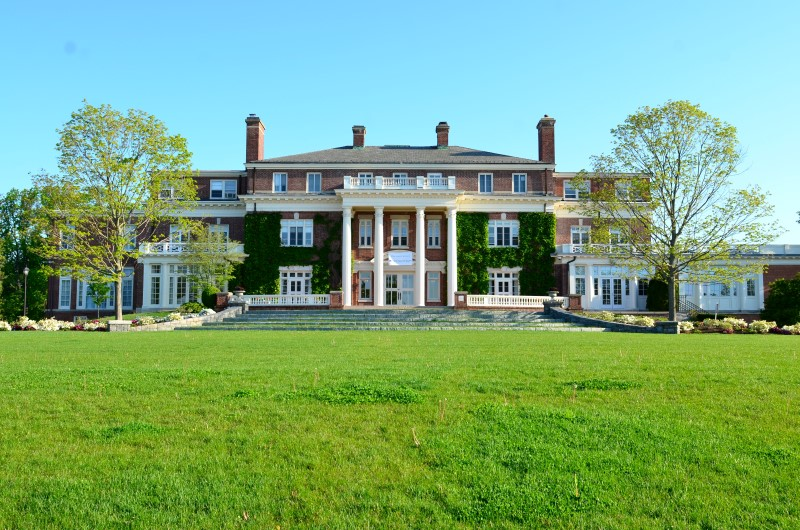

Location
- 1177 King Street; Greenwich, Connecticut 06836-0623; United States

Information
- Former names: Convent of the Sacred Heart
- Type: All girls K-12 (Co-ed PS and PK)
- Religious affiliation: Catholic
- Established: 1848 (178 years ago)
- CEEB code: 070220
- Principal: Michael F. Baber
- Enrollment: 650
- Campus: 110 Acres
- Colors: Green and white
- Mascot: Tiger
- Rivals: Greenwich Academy
- Tuition: $52,100 (Upper School)
- Affiliation: Private, independent
- Website: www.shgreenwich.org

Sacred Heart Greenwich, formally known as the Convent of the Sacred Heart, is a private, independent Catholic all-girls college-preparatory school from kindergarten through twelfth grade with a coed preschool and prekindergarten located in Greenwich, Connecticut. As an independent day school, it is privately operated within the Diocese of Bridgeport and accepts students from throughout Fairfield and Westchester County. It serves students ages 3–18 in preschool through twelfth grade.

== Accreditation ==
Convent of the Sacred Heart is accredited by the New England Association of Schools and Colleges and is approved by the Connecticut State Board of Education. They are also a member of the National Association of Independent Schools, the College Board, the Connecticut Association of Independent Schools, the National Coalition of Girls’ Schools and the Network of Sacred Heart Schools in the United States.

== Alumnae ==
- Margaret Brennan, Class of 1998. Moderator of Face the Nation
- Rosario Kennedy, former deputy mayor of the City of Miami, Florida
