= Elicio Argüelles Menocal =

Cuban exile and former politician

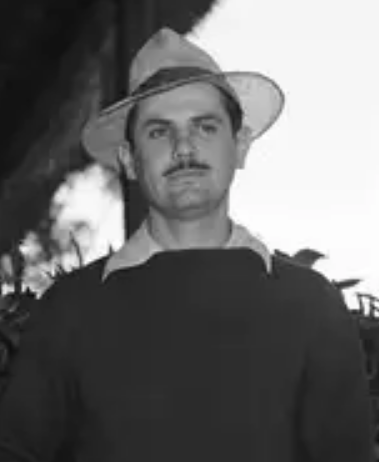

Cuban Senator
- In office 1958–1959

Personal details
- Born: April 26, 1910 Guane, Cuba
- Died: January 24, 1988 (Aged 77) Miami
- Children: Rosario Kennedy
- Parent: Elicio Argüelles Pozo

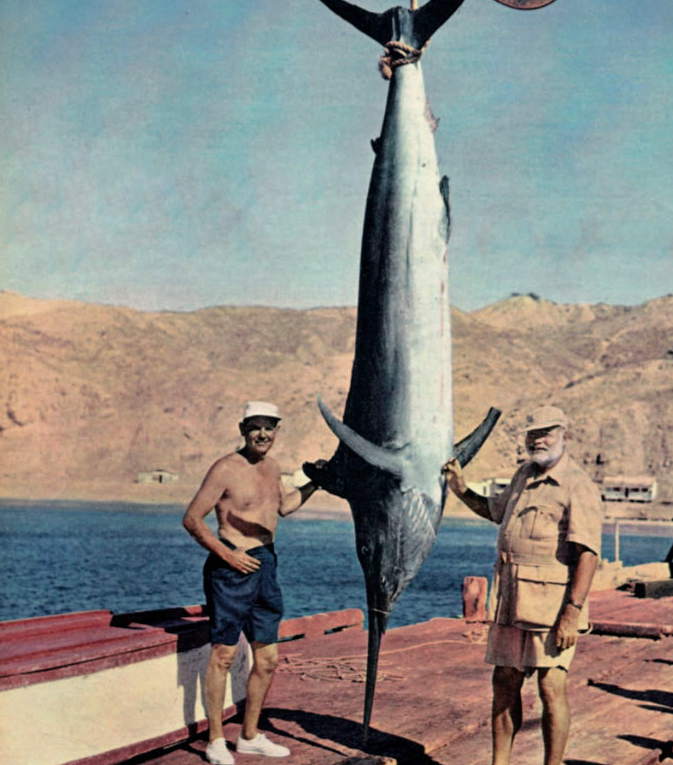
Elicio Argüelles and Ernest Hemmingway in Cabo Blanco, Peru

Elicio Argüelles y García–Menocal (Elicio Argüelles II or Elicio Argüelles Jr.) was a Cuban exile and politician—one of the last of the Cuban senators elected to office before the Communist Revolution.

== Biography ==
His father was Elicio Argüelles Pozo. He, and his father met Ernest Hemingway at a Jai alai game in Havana, and they became family friends. Argüelles' father owned the Frontón Jai Alai, the largest Jai Alai arena in Hanava.

In Cuba during World War II, Argüelles was instrumental in the FBI effort to hunt Nazis in Latin America and was involved in some way with Hemingway's anti-submarine missions. In the late 1950s, he had become one of Hemingway's five closest friends, alongside his cousin, Mario Menocal.

His daughter is Rosario Kennedy. Argüelles and his family fled Cuba around 1960 to escape persecution by the new government of Fidel Castro, and wound up settling in exile in Little Havana, in Miami.
