= Venezuelan Human Rights and Democracy Protection Act =

- Long title: To impose targeted sanctions on individuals responsible for carrying out or ordering human rights abuses against the citizens of Venezuela, and for other purposes.
- Announced in: the 113th United States Congress
- Sponsored by: Rep. Ileana Ros-Lehtinen (R, FL-27)
- Number of co-sponsors: 8

Codification
- U.S.C. sections affected: 50 U.S.C. § 1701 et seq., 50 U.S.C. § 2415, 50 U.S.C. § 1705, 8 U.S.C. § 1101, 18 U.S.C. § 921, and others.
- Agencies affected: United States Agency for International Development, Executive Office of the President, United Nations, United States Department of State, Organization of American States, Department of Homeland Security
- Authorizations of appropriations: $5,000,000 in fiscal year 2015.

Legislative history
- Introduced in the House as H.R. 4587 by Rep. Ileana Ros-Lehtinen (R, FL-27) on May 7, 2014; Committee consideration by United States House Committee on Foreign Affairs, United States House Committee on the Judiciary; Passed the House on May 28, 2014 (voice vote)

The Venezuelan Human Rights and Democracy Protection Act (H.R. 4587) is a bill that would impose sanctions against Venezuela and authorize appropriations to support civil society in that country. The sanctions would be directed at any government official who was involved in the mistreatment of protestors. Sanctioned officials would have their assets frozen and would not be able to travel to the United States.

The bill was introduced into the United States House of Representatives during the 113th United States Congress.

== Background ==
The Venezuelan Human Rights and Democracy Protection Act was written and passed in reaction to the 2014 Venezuelan protests in which at least 43 people were killed and at least 835 were injured.

In early 2014, a series of protests, political demonstrations, and civil unrest occurred throughout Venezuela. The protests erupted largely as a result of the high levels of criminal violence, inflation, and chronic scarcity of basic goods. The protesters claim that these are caused by the economic policies of Venezuela's government, including strict price controls, which allegedly have led to one of the highest inflation rates in the world. However, government supporters claim that government economic policy, especially that of under previous president Hugo Chávez (1999–2013), significantly improved the quality of life of Venezuelans, and blame external factors for ongoing problems.

== Provisions of the bill ==
This summary is based largely on the summary provided by the Congressional Research Service, a public domain source.

The Venezuelan Human Rights and Democracy Protection Act would direct the Secretary of State to require the U.S. Permanent Representative to the Organization of American States (OAS) to use U.S. influence at the OAS to protect the Inter-American Democratic Charter, and strengthen the independent Inter-American Commission on Human Rights to protect human rights throughout the Western Hemisphere, especially in Venezuela.

The bill would direct the President of the United States to impose asset blocking and U.S. exclusion sanctions against any person, including a current or former official of the government of Venezuela or a person acting on behalf of such government, who has: (1) perpetrated or is responsible for directing acts of violence or human rights abuses against individuals participating in protests in Venezuela that began on February 12, 2014; (2) directed or ordered the arrest or prosecution of a person primarily because of the person's exercise of freedom of expression or freedom of assembly in relation to such protests; (3) knowingly assisted, sponsored, or provided significant financial, material, or technological support for, or goods or services in support of, the commission of such acts; or (4) engaged in censorship against individuals or media outlets disseminating information in relation to such protests.

The bill would set forth related penalty requirements.

The bill would state that U.S. exclusion sanctions shall not apply if necessary to permit the United States to comply with the Agreement regarding the Headquarters of the United Nations or other applicable international obligations.

The bill would authorize the President to waive sanctions if: (1) in the U.S. national security interests, or (2) conditions in Venezuela have improved with regard to respect for peaceful protest and basic human rights.

The bill would direct the President to transmit to Congress a list of persons who: (1) transfer or facilitate the transfer of goods or technologies that are likely to be used to commit serious rights abuses to Venezuela, to any entity organized under the laws of Venezuela, or to any national of Venezuela, for use in Venezuela; or (2) provide services with respect to such goods or technologies after their transfer to Venezuela.

The bill would direct the Secretary to submit comprehensive strategies to Congress: (1) promoting internet and information access freedom in Venezuela, and (2) outlining U.S. support for the citizens of Venezuela in seeking free elections and the development of an independent civil society.

The bill would state that it shall be U.S. policy to: (1) support efforts to identify prisoners of conscience and cases of human rights abuses in Venezuela, and (2) offer refugee status or political asylum in the United States to political dissidents in Venezuela or assist in their relocation to other countries.

The bill would authorize appropriations for assistance to civil society in Venezuela.

The bill would sunset this Act two years after its enactment.

== Congressional Budget Office report ==
This summary is based largely on the summary provided by the Congressional Budget Office, as ordered reported by the House Committee on Foreign Affairs on April 30, 2014. This is a public domain source.

H.R. 4587 would impose sanctions against Venezuela and authorize appropriations to support civil society in that country. The bill's provisions would expire two years after enactment. The Congressional Budget Office (CBO) estimates that implementing H.R. 4587 would cost $7 million over the 2015-2019 period, assuming appropriation of the specified and estimated amounts. Pay-as-you-go procedures apply to this legislation because it would affect direct spending and revenues; however, CBO estimates that those effects would not be significant.

The bill would authorize the appropriation of $5 million in 2015 to promote civil society in Venezuela. In recent years, the administration has spent roughly that amount each year for similar activities in Venezuela. Other provisions of H.R. 4587 would increase administrative costs of the United States Department of State and the United States Department of the Treasury. Based on information from the Administration, CBO estimates the departments would require additional appropriations of $1 million a year in 2015 and 2016.

Sanctions required under H.R. 4587 would probably increase the number of people who would be denied a visa by the United States Secretary of State. Most visa fees are retained by the department and spent without further appropriation, but some fees are deposited in the Treasury as revenues. CBO estimates that implementing those sanction provisions would affect very few people and, thus, have an insignificant budgetary effect.

Because the bill would prohibit certain activities involving Venezuela and subject individuals who undertake those activities to civil and criminal penalties, it could increase revenues and direct spending from the collection of penalties; however, CBO estimates that the net budgetary effect of any additional penalties would be negligible.

H.R. 4587 contains no intergovernmental mandates as defined in the Unfunded Mandates Reform Act (UMRA) and would impose no costs on state, local, or tribal governments. H.R. 4587 would impose private-sector mandates as defined in UMRA by prohibiting certain transactions with entities associated with human rights violations in Venezuela. In addition, individuals found to be associated with the human rights violations could have their visas revoked. The cost of the mandates would be any forgone income directly related to the prohibited transactions and to the loss of visas. Based on data from the U.S. International Trade Commission, the total value of transactions that could be affected by the legislation is low. Further, CBO expects that the number of individuals in the United States that could have their visa revoked under the bill is small. Therefore, CBO estimates that the aggregate cost of the mandates would fall below the annual threshold for private-sector mandates established in UMRA ($152 million in 2014, adjusted annually for inflation).

== Procedural history ==
The Venezuelan Human Rights and Democracy Protection Act was introduced into the United States House of Representatives on May 7, 2014, by Rep. Ileana Ros-Lehtinen (R, FL-27). The bill was referred to the United States House Committee on Foreign Affairs and the United States House Committee on the Judiciary. The bill was passed by the House in a voice vote on May 28, 2014.

== Debate and discussion ==
The bill's sponsor, Rep. Ros-Lehtinen (R-FL), said that the bill was to "condemn the ongoing human rights abuses being committed in Venezuela, and to answer the cries of the people of Venezuela." Ros-Lehtinen also said that she was "pleased that the House of Representatives has acted to punish the thugs of the Maduro regime for brutally repressing and violating the human rights of those seeking to exercise their basic freedoms of speech and assembly in Venezuela."

Another supporter, Rep. Joaquin Castro (D-TX), said that Venezuela should find its own solution, but that the legislation "makes it clear the United States will not turn a blind eye to human rights violations."

Opponents of the bill, such as Rep. Gregory Meeks (D-NY), were concerned that the measure took a step too far. Meeks said that "I remain committed to doing everything in my power to support a positive outcome in that nation. But I believe vehemently that unilateral action by the United States is not the answer." Meeks also argued that the bill "does not advance U.S. interests, it will not help the people of Venezuela and it sends the message to our regional allies that we don't care much about what they think." Regional groups like UNASUR, the Caribbean Community, and the Organization of American States have all supported the government instead of the protestors. Fourteen House members wrote a letter to President Barack Obama about the bill in which they said "as unilateral U.S. intervention and sanctions have caused deep resentment throughout Latin America, these are not the right tools for our regional policy in instances where they lack any significant regional backing."

The Obama Administration testified about similar legislation in the United States Senate, indicating then that the sanctions could end up being counterproductive by giving the Venezuelan government propaganda material. One of the members of the opposition coalition against the Venezuelan government, a group called MUD, agreed, saying that "the government's not going to be hurt. On the contrary, they will use this to play the victim, to travel the world and talk about U.S. imperialism."

== See also ==
- List of bills in the 113th United States Congress
