= Rodrigo Lehtinen =

American LGBT rights advocate

Rodrigo Heng-Lehtinen
- Born: April 1, 1986 (age 40); Miami, Florida, U.S.
- Education: Brown University (BA)
- Occupation: LGBTQ rights advocate
- Parents: Dexter Lehtinen (father); Ileana Ros-Lehtinen (mother)
- Relatives: Enrique Ros (grandfather)

Rodrigo Heng-Lehtinen (/ˈleɪtənən/ LAY-tən-ən; born April 1, 1986) is an American LGBTQ rights advocate. He is the first openly transgender child of a sitting member of Congress.

== Early life and education ==
Heng–Lehtinen was born in Miami, Florida, on April 1, 1986. He graduated from Palmer Trinity School, where he was active in a dramatic arts club and mountaineering team, served on the Honor Council, and founded a high school chapter of Amnesty International. He attended Brown University, where he began living openly as a transgender man and later came out to his parents.

== Career ==
Heng-Lehtinen was a member of Queer Alliance at Brown University. While attending Brown, he produced the documentary, Free Within These Walls, about Cuban prisoners of conscience. Heng-Lehtinen was a field organizer for the National Gay and Lesbian Task Force. He was later the membership director at Gender Justice LA, a grassroots organization that works to build the power of the transgender community in Los Angeles through community organizing and leadership development. He also worked in fundraising at Liberty Hill Foundation, organized a transgender leadership development conference with the Transgender Law Center, and served as the membership manager at GLAAD, an LGBTQ media advocacy organization.

In May 2015, Heng-Lehtinen was honored by the LGBTQ-rights group, SAVE Dade, at its 2015 Champions of Equality reception. He was honored for appearing with his mother in a highly rated television interview, increasing visibility of the transgender community.

In May 2016, Heng-Lehtinen and his parents appeared in a public service announcement titled "Family is Everything", which discusses his family's personal journey and acceptance, that all South Florida families should embrace their children, and the reason why all Americans should have the same opportunities regardless of gender identity or sexual orientation.

Heng-Lehtinen was the public education director at Freedom For All Americans, the national campaign for LGBTQ nondiscrimination protections.

Heng-Lehtinen became deputy executive director for policy and action at the National Center for Transgender Equality on July 1, 2019. In July of 2021 Heng-Lehtinen moved from Deputy Executive Director into his current role as executive director of the National Center for Transgender Equality.

In 2022, Heng-Lehtinen appeared in The Daily Wire documentary What Is a Woman?, during which he talked about the issue of transgender people in sports.

In January 2024, NCTE revealed plans to merge with the Transgender Legal Defense and Education Fund (TLDEF), an organization dedicated to advancing transgender rights through legal action. The merger is expected to be completed in the summer 2024, resulting in the formation of a new entity called Advocates for Trans Equality (A4TE), with Heng-Lehtinen continuing in the role of Executive Director.

== Personal life ==
Heng-Lehtinen is the older child of attorney and politician Dexter Lehtinen and former congresswoman Ileana Ros-Lehtinen. He is the grandson of author Enrique Ros. He is of Turkish-Jewish and Cuban-Jewish descent through his mother and of Finnish descent through his father. Heng-Lehtinen is the first openly transgender child of a member of Congress.
