= David T. Kennedy =

American politician

31st and 33rd Mayor of Miami
- In office August 17, 1973 – November 8, 1973
- Preceded by: Maurice Ferré (interim)
- Succeeded by: Maurice Ferré
- In office November 25, 1970 – April 11, 1973
- Preceded by: Stephen P. Clark
- Succeeded by: Maurice Ferré (interim)

Member of the Miami City Commission
- In office 1961–1970

Vice Mayor of Miami
- In office 1963
- Mayor: Robert King High
- Preceded by: Henry L. Balaban
- Succeeded by: Sidney Aronovitz

Personal details
- Born: April 7, 1934 Baltimore, Maryland
- Died: September 4, 2014 (aged 80) South Miami, Florida
- Party: Democratic
- Spouse(s): Marie Cicirelli Petit Rosario Kennedy (m. 1978; div. 1987) Miriam M. Suarez (m. 1989; div. 1990)
- Children: David Thomas Kennedy, Jr. Kimberly Lynn Kennedy; O'lydia Kennedy
- Education: Florida State University (BA, MA); University of Miami (JD)
- Profession: Attorney

David Thomas Kennedy (April 7, 1934 – September 4, 2014) was an American attorney and politician. Kennedy served as the Mayor of Miami from 1970 until 1973.

== Background ==
Kennedy received his B.A. and M.A. from Florida State University and graduated from the University of Miami School of Law in 1958.

== Miami City Commission (1961–1970) ==
Kennedy was elected to the Miami City Commission (city council) in 1961. In 1963, he served as vice mayor.

Kennedy also served as director of the Miami-Dade Chamber of Commerce, and as a member of the Government Research Council.

In 1964, Kennedy unsuccessfully ran for the fourth district seat on the Miami Metro Commission.

== Mayor of Miami (1970–1973) ==
Kennedy used his tenure on the city commission as a springboard to the mayoralty. In 1970, after incumbent mayor Stephen P. Clark resigned to become Miami Metro Mayor (county execjutive), Kennedy was appointed city mayor. He was elected to a full term in 1971.

As mayor, Kennedy sought to transform Miami into an eco-friendly city. With inspiration from renowned 19th century architect Frederick Law Olmsted, Kennedy drafted the plans for the creation of Miami's Bicentennial Park, which would open in 1976. While mayor, Kennedy also served as campaign manager for Indiana Senator Birch Bayh's potential run for President in the 1972 Democratic primary, but Bayh ultimately declined to run. Kennedy then endorsed the unsuccessful campaign of Hubert Humphrey for the Democratic presidential nomination. In the general election, Kennedy joined Democrats for Nixon, becoming its vice president. After Nixon's reelection, it was also rumored that Kennedy would be offered an ambassadorship in Latin America, but nothing came to fruition.

=== Bribery controversy ===
In 1973, Kennedy became engulfed in a bribery controversy, alongside political insider Frank Martin, Mina Davidson, Temperance Wright, and judges Jack Turner and Murray Goodman. As early as 1971, the Dade County Sheriff's Office and the Miami Police Department secretly began investigating Martin, who was known to have influence with local officials. Kennedy, a friend of Davidson, arranged a meeting with Martin to get Judge Turner to reduce the drug-related sentence of Davidson's son. Additionally, Martin and Wright convinced Judge Goodman to reduce the sentence of a man convicted of sexual offenses. Caught on tape by police wiretaps at a Miami truck stop, Kennedy and the others were all arrested for conspiracy to commit bribery.

Upon his arrest and subsequent indictment, Florida Governor Reuben Askew suspended Kennedy's tenure as mayor and temporarily replaced him with Maurice Ferré on April 11, 1973. On August 15, 1973, charges against Kennedy and the others were dropped by Sarasota County judge Lynn Silvertooth, and Kennedy was reinstated as mayor two days later. Despite having the charges cleared, however, Kennedy, who was up for reelection in November 1973, chose not to run. Ferre was elected to his first full term on November 8, 1973.

== Post-mayoralty ==
After leaving office, Kennedy resumed his law career and maintained an active presence in Dade County politics. In 1974, Kennedy successfully lobbied to install Don Hickman as Miami's fire chief, despite the fact that Hickman did not have a college education. Kennedy also served as a strategist for his wife Rosario Kennedy's successful campaign for city commissioner in the 1985. Rosario Kennedy was later appointed vice mayor. In 1986, Kennedy, along with hotel magnate Steve Muss, led a statewide campaign to legalize casinos in a referendum later that year.

== Personal life ==
Kennedy was married to Marie Cicirelli Petit, then Rosario Kennedy from 1978–1987. He was later married to ballerina Miriam M. Suarez from 1989–1990. Kennedy had three children with his wives.

Ferre, inspired by his predecessor, named one of the parks that Kennedy helped create after him: David T. Kennedy Park, in Coconut Grove, Miami.

At the time of his death, Kennedy lived in Coral Gables.
