= Enrique Ros =

Cuban-American author and activist

- Born: Enrique Emilio Ros y Pérez; 1924; Cienfuegos, Cuba
- Died: April 10, 2013 (aged 89); Miami, Florida, U.S.
- Occupation: Businessman
- Children: Ileana Ros-Lehtinen
- Relatives: Rodrigo Lehtinen (grandson)

Enrique Emilio Ros y Pérez (1924 – April 10, 2013) was a Cuban-American businessman, author, and activist opposed to Cuban president Fidel Castro.

== Early life ==
Enrique Ros was born in 1924 in Cienfuegos, Cuba. He left the island for the United States shortly after the Cuban Revolution and settled in the Miami area, where he became active in the Cuban exile community.

== Career ==
Ros hosted radio shows on Radio y Televisión Martí, a U.S. government-funded broadcaster aimed at Cuba. He was a strong advocate of retaining the United States embargo against Cuba. He was the author of Revolucion de 1933 en Cuba. He is also a Bay of Pigs veteran and historian of the exile struggle.

== Personal life ==
Ros was married to Amanda Adato (1926–2011) and they had two children, Enrique Jr. "Henry" and retired U.S. Representative Ileana Ros-Lehtinen, and four grandchildren: Jennifer and Katherine Ros, and Patricia and Rodrigo Lehtinen.

Ros died on April 10, 2013, in a South Miami, Florida hospital from respiratory complications. He was 89.

== Writing career ==
Ros specialized in modern Cuban political history, publishing works on topics including the 1933 revolution, the clandestine struggle against Castro, the UMAP forced-labor camps, and the role of Cuban leaders in Africa. His books - often based on official documents, period newspapers, and firsthand testimonies - reflect a strongly anti-communist perspective typical of Miami’s exile historiography.

=== Books ===
- Ros, Enrique 2011 Vicente García/ El incomprendido Mayor General Cubano Ediciones Universal, Miami ISBN 1-59388-231-9
- Ros, Enrique 2006 El clandestinaje y la lucha armada contra castro/ The clandestinity and the armed fight against Castro (Cuba y sus Jueces) Ediciones Universal, Miami ISBN 1-59388-079-0
- Ros, Enrique 2005 Revolucion de 1933 en Cuba Ediciones Universal, Miami ISBN 1-59388-047-2
- Ros, Enrique 2003 Fidel Castro y El Gatillo Alegre: Sus Años Universitarios (Coleccion Cuba y Sus Jueces) Miami ISBN 1-59388-006-5
- Ros, Enrique 2002 Ernesto Che Guevara: mito y realidad. Ediciones Universal, Miami. ISBN 0-89729-988-4
- Ros, Enrique 1999 Aventura Africana De Fidel Castro (Coleccion Cuba y Sus Jueces) Miami ISBN 0-89729-908-6
- Ros, Enrique 1998 Cubanos Combatiente: Peleando En Distingidos Frentes (Coleccion Cuba y Sus Jueces) Miami ISBN 0-89729-868-3
- Ros, Enrique 1996 Años Criticos: Del Camino De La Accion Al Camino Del Entendimiento (Coleccion Cuba Y Sus Jueces) Miami ISBN 0-89729-814-4
- Ros, Enrique 1995 De Giron a La Crisis De Los Cohetes: La Segunda Derrota (Coleccion Cuba Y Sus Jueces) Miami ISBN 0-89729-773-3
- Ros, Enrique and Orlando Bosch 1994 Giron la verdadera historia (Coleccion Cuba y sus jueces) Miami ISBN 0-89729-738-5

== See also ==
- Radio y Televisión Martí
- Cuban exile
- Bay of Pigs Invasion
