= 1989 Florida's 18th congressional district special election =

- August 29, 1989

Florida's 18th congressional district
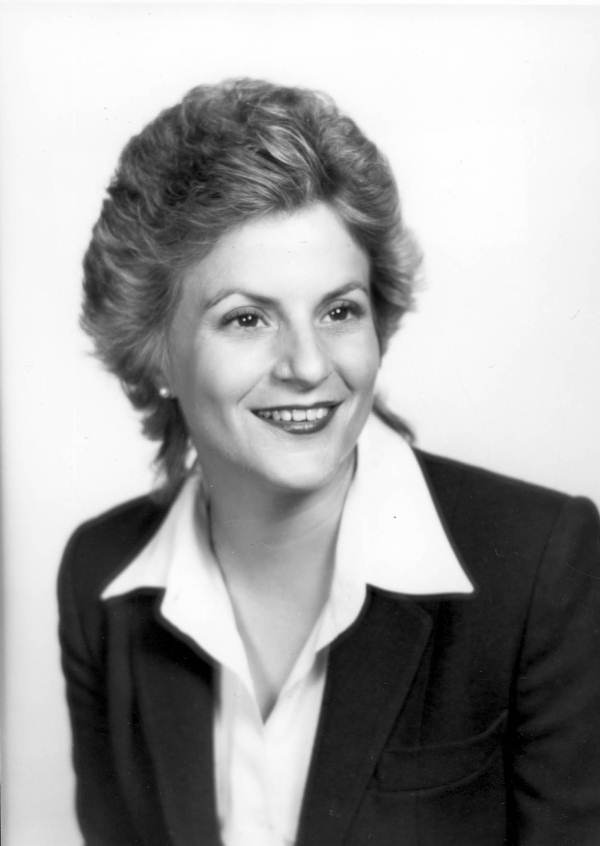

Nominee	Ileana Ros-Lehtinen	Gerald Richman
Party	Republican	Democratic
Popular vote	49,638	43,759
Percentage	53.14%	46.85%
U.S. Representative before election
Claude Pepper
Democratic
Elected U.S. Representative
Ileana Ros-Lehtinen
Republican

A special election to determine the member of the United States House of Representatives for Florida's 18th congressional district was held on August 29, 1989. Republican Ileana Ros-Lehtinen defeated Democrat Gerald Richman in the runoff vote, 53.14% to 46.85%. Ros-Lehtinen replaced Claude Pepper, who died in office from stomach cancer.

Changing demographics in Florida's 18th congressional district had seen the largely white district change into a 40% Cuban American district. The election campaign focused on this trend as the campaign was dominated by discussions of race after Republican National Chairman Lee Atwater declared that the district should become the "Cuban American seat". Democrat Gerald Richman ran a campaign with the slogan "This is an American seat" in response to Atwater's comments, and both Ros-Lehtinen and Richman appealed to their respective racial bases in the general. Ros-Lehtinen won a competitive campaign to flip the seat, and became the first Cuban American to serve in Congress.

== Background ==
United States Congressman Claude Pepper died in office from stomach cancer on May 30, 1989, after serving in the House for over a quarter century, opening up a special election to fill his seat. Pepper had previously served as a U.S. Senator from Florida as well and was seen as a lion of the U.S. Congress. Pepper's reputation and length of service had insulated him from the racial splits that existed in his district, and The New York Times noted that he had been able to bridge the gap inside of the district. The district had moved from a largely white district into a 40% Cuban American district. Florida Governor Bob Martinez announced the special election schedule the day after Pepper's burial.

== Republican primary ==
=== Candidates ===
==== Declared ====
- Ileana Ros-Lehtinen, State Senator
- Carlos Perez, businessman and Republican Party activist
- John Stembridge, former Mayor of North Miami
- David M. Fleischer, insurance broker and former plumber

=== Summary ===
Early coverage on the Republican primary named State Senator Ileana Ros-Lehtinen as the favorite to win the Republican nomination. Jeb Bush managed Ros-Lehtinen's campaign. After Pepper's death, Republican National Committee chairman Lee Atwater declared that the seat should become a "Cuban American seat" and immediately caused controversy with the comment. Challengers other than Ros-Lehtinen included: Carlos Perez, a business owner who had been highlighted in Ronald Reagan's State of the Union address; David Fleischer, an insurance broker who decided to run after Atwater's comments; and John Stembridge, a furniture store owner who claimed that Pepper "was like an adopted father to me and I felt like he was personally grooming me to take his place".

Ileana Ros-Lehtinen won the primary with more than 80% of the vote, winning every precinct and avoiding a runoff. "We're quite humbled and really flabbergasted," Ros-Lehtinen said at her surprise of winning the primary by such a wide margin.

Republican primary results
Party	Candidate	Votes	%
Republican	Ileana Ros-Lehtinen	16,873	82.80
Republican	Carlos Perez	2,251	11.05
Republican	David Fleischer	691	3.39
Republican	John Stembridge	563	2.76
Total votes		20,578	100

== Democratic primary ==
=== Declared ===
- Rosario Kennedy, Miami City Commissioner
- Gerald Richman, Former President of the Florida Bar
- Jo Ann Pepper, Niece of Claude Pepper and federal probation officer
- Jeff Allen, Law school graduate
- Bernard Anscher, Retired industrialist and philanthropist
- Marvin Dunn, Psychologist and unsuccessful candidate for Mayor of Miami
- Sonny Wright

=== Withdrew ===
- Jack Gordon, State Senator
- Raul Masvidal, banker and unsuccessful mayoral candidate

=== Summary ===
The Democratic primary was much more chaotic than the Republican one. After Lee Atwater announced that the district should become a "Cuban American seat", early Democratic favorite Jack Gordon dropped out after two days, stating that he refused to run a campaign that would have to be about "stopping the Cubans". Rosario Kennedy, a Miami City Commissioner, was handicapped as the initial favorite. In a first-round upset, Gerald Richman, the former President of the Florida Bar, beat Kennedy by 146 votes. Both advanced to the runoff.

The runoff campaign was dominated by controversial discussions of race. Richman repeatedly said, "This is an American seat" in reaction to Atwater's comments. Jo Ann Pepper, Marvin Dunn, and Sonny Wright, who split the African American neighborhoods in the district, all endorsed Kennedy. The Miami Herald endorsed Kennedy and called Richman's campaign "naked, deliberate, bigotry". Richman easily won the runoff over Kennedy, dominating in white and Jewish neighborhoods. The results split starkly among racial lines and after Richman's win, Kennedy refused to endorse him.

Democratic primary results
Party	Candidate	Votes	%
Democratic	Gerald Richman	5,794	27.98
Democratic	Rosario Kennedy	5,635	27.21
Democratic	Jo Ann Pepper	5,071	24.49
Democratic	Marvin Dunn	1,713	8.27
Democratic	Sonny Wright	1,516	7.32
Democratic	Bernard "Bernie" Anscher	703	3.39
Democratic	John Paul Rosser	280	1.35
Total votes		21,868	100

Democratic runoff results
Party	Candidate	Votes	%
Democratic	Gerald Richman	14,411	60.97
Democratic	Rosario Kennedy	9,226	39.03
Total votes		23,640	100

== General election ==
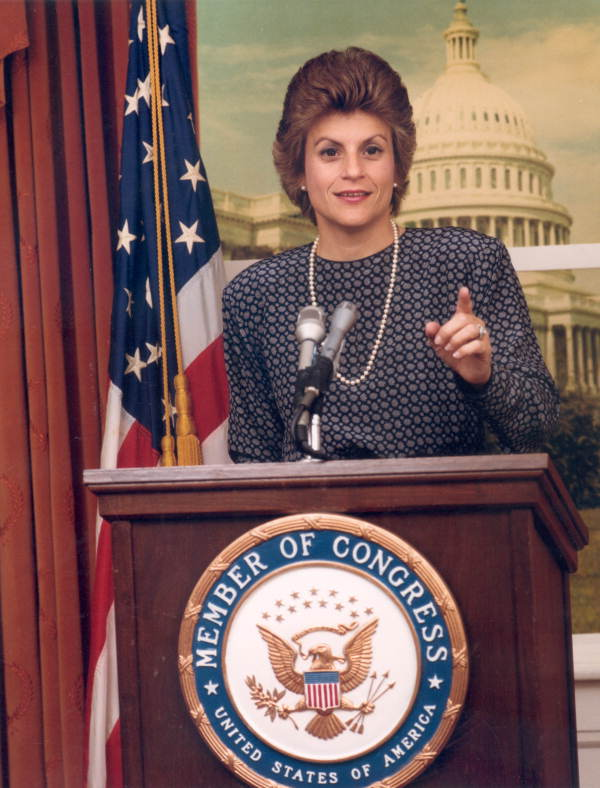
Ileana Ros-Lehtinen speaks in 1989 after her successful election.

The racial themes from both primaries continued throughout the general election. Richman's campaign came under continued fire for his "This is an American seat" slogan, while Ros-Lehtinen's campaign was criticized for a Spanish language brochure which emphasized Richman's Jewish religion. Richman spent more than $300,000 of his own money on his campaign. Ros-Lehtinen called Richman and his campaign bigoted and refused to appear at any debates or events with him. A poll by The Miami Herald found that 28 out of every 29 Cuban American voters supported Ros-Lehtinen while 24 of every 25 Jewish voters supported Richman, regardless of normal political ideology and leanings. National Republicans came to support Ros-Lehtinen, including President George H. W. Bush who hosted a fundraiser for her campaign and appeared jointly with her.

Ros-Lehtinen won the seat with a six-point margin, 53 to 47 percent. Voter turnout matched strongly with ethnic lines. According to exit polling, approximately 60 percent of the district's Hispanic voters turned out, while only 40 percent of the Anglos and 34 percent of the African Americans did so. Ileana Ros-Lehtinen became the first Latina and the first Cuban American to serve in Congress after this victory. After the election, the Anti-Defamation League called for a "healing process" for the communities of the district and described the election as a "dark moment". Both campaigns were censured by the Fair Campaigns Practices Committee, a watchdog group, for the racially tinged campaigns they ran.

Special election results
Party	Candidate	Votes	%	±%
Republican	Ileana Ros-Lehtinen	49,638	53.14%	+53.14%
Democratic	Gerald Richman	43,759	46.85%	−53.14%
Total votes		93,397	100.0%	
Majority		5,874	6.29%	
Republican gain from Democratic		Swing	53.14%	
