= Domestic Partnership Benefits and Obligations Act =

The Domestic Partnership Benefits and Obligations Act or the DPBO Act (S. 1910, H.R. 3485) was a U.S. bill that would allow LGBT federal employees to give their unrecognized same-sex spouses and partners health insurance, life insurance, government pensions, and other employment related benefits and obligations that married heterosexual federal employees enjoy by being married and heterosexual.

== 110th Congress ==
The House version of the bill was originally introduced December 19, 2007 by Rep. Tammy Baldwin (D-WI). The bill garnered 90 cosponsors and was referred to the Subcommittee on the Constitution, Civil Rights, and Civil Liberties but was not acted upon.

The Senate version of the bill was also introduced on December 19, 2007, by Sen. Joe Lieberman (I-CT). The bill was referred to the Committee on Homeland Security and Governmental Affairs of which Lieberman himself was the chair.

A hearing was held on September 24, 2008, with testimony coming from the deputy director of the United States Office of Personnel Management, an executive at IBM, the president of the National Treasury Employees Union and two others. Though it garnered 21 Democrats, 1 Republican and 1 Independent as cosponsors, the Senate bill also died when the committee did not vote on it.

== 111th Congress ==
The act was reintroduced in the 111th Congress on May 20, 2009. The measure is sponsored by Reps. Tammy Baldwin (D-WI) & Ileana Ros-Lehtinen (R-FL) in the House of Representatives and by Sens. Joe Lieberman (I-CT) & Susan Collins (R-ME) in the Senate. The legislation has 140 cosponsors in the House and 31 in the Senate as of May 27, 2010.

In May 2009, Rep. Barney Frank told an interviewer from the Washington Blade that he believed supporters of the act "have a shot" at passing the bill. On June 17, 2009, President Obama announced his support for the Domestic Partners Benefits and Obligations Act, which he called "crucial legislation that will guarantee these rights for all federal employees."

On November 18, 2009, the bill was reported out of the House Oversight and Government Reform Committee by a vote of 23-12. On December 16, 2009, the bill was reported out of the Senate Committee on Homeland Security and Governmental Affairs by an 8-1 vote. Senator Bob Bennett (Junior senator, Utah) was the sole Committee vote against the bill.

== 112th Congress ==
The Domestic Partnership Benefits and Obligations Act of 2011 was approved by voice vote by the Senate Committee on Homeland Security and Governmental Affairs on May 16, 2012.

== Legislative history ==
Congress	Short title	Bill number(s)	Date introduced	Sponsor(s)	# of cosponsors	Latest status
113th Congress	Domestic Partnership Benefits and Obligations Act of 2013	H.R. 3135	September 19, 2013	Mark Pocan (D-WI)	78	
113th Congress	Domestic Partnership Benefits and Obligations Act of 2013	S. 1529	September 19, 2013	Tammy Baldwin (D-WI)	11	
112th Congress	Domestic Partnership Benefits and Obligations Act of 2011	H.R. 3485	November 18, 2011	Tammy Baldwin (D-WI)	140	
112th Congress	Domestic Partnership Benefits and Obligations Act of 2011	S. 1910	November 18, 2011	Joe Lieberman (I-CT)	30	Approved by the Committee on Homeland Security and Governmental Affairs on a voice vote on May 16, 2012.
111th Congress	Domestic Partnership Benefits and Obligations Act of 2009	H.R. 2517	May 20, 2009	Tammy Baldwin (D-WI)	140	Ordered to be Reported (Amended) by the Yeas and Nays: 23 - 12.
111th Congress	Domestic Partnership Benefits and Obligations Act of 2009	S. 1102	May 20, 2009	Joe Lieberman (I-CT)	31	Ordered to be Reported by the Committee on Homeland Security and Governmental Affairs on an 8-1 vote on December 16, 2009.
110th Congress	Domestic Partnership Benefits and Obligations Act of 2007	H.R. 4838	December 19, 2007	Tammy Baldwin (D-WI)	90	Died in the Subcommittee on the Constitution, Civil Rights, and Civil Liberties
110th Congress	Domestic Partnership Benefits and Obligations Act of 2007	S. 2521	December 19, 2007	Joe Lieberman (I-CT)	23	Died in the Committee on Homeland Security and Governmental Affairs
