= Ileana Ros-Lehtinen =

American politician (born 1952)

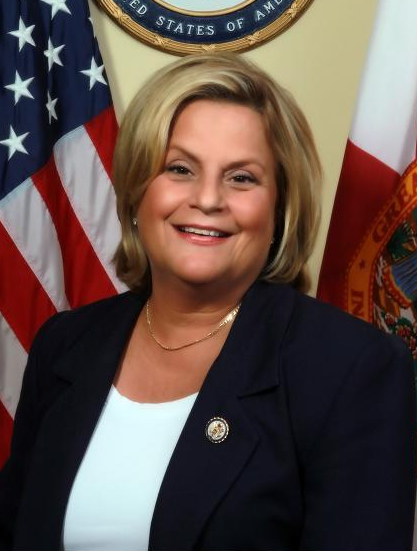

Chair of the House Foreign Affairs Committee
- In office January 3, 2011 – January 3, 2013
- Preceded by: Howard Berman
- Succeeded by: Ed Royce

Member of the U.S. House of Representatives from Florida
- In office August 29, 1989 – January 3, 2019 (Note: Ros-Lehtinen's official service begins on the date of the special election, while she was not sworn in until September 6, 1989.)
- Preceded by: Claude Pepper
- Succeeded by: Donna Shalala
- Constituency: 18th district (1989–2013); 27th district (2013–2019)

Member of the Florida Senate from the 34th district
- In office November 4, 1986 – August 29, 1989
- Preceded by: Joe Gersten
- Succeeded by: Lincoln Díaz-Balart

Member of the Florida House of Representatives from the 110th district
- In office November 2, 1982 – November 4, 1986
- Preceded by: Roberta Fox (redistricted)
- Succeeded by: Lincoln Díaz-Balart

Personal details
- Born: Ileana Carmen Ros y Adato; July 15, 1952 (age 74) Havana, Cuba
- Party: Republican
- Spouse: Dexter Lehtinen (m. 1984)
- Children: 2, including Rodrigo
- Relatives: Enrique Ros (father)
- Education: Miami Dade College (AA); Florida International University (BA, MA); University of Miami (EdD)
- Ros-Lehtinen's voice Ros-Lehtinen on human rights in relation to trade relations with Russia. Recorded November 16, 2012

Ileana Ros-Lehtinen (/ˌɪliˈɑːnə rɒs ˈleɪtənən/ Il-ee-AH-nə ross LAY-tən-ən; née Ileana Carmen Ros y Adato; born July 15, 1952) is an American politician and lobbyist from Miami who represented Florida's 27th congressional district from 1989 to 2019. At the end of her tenure, she was the most senior U.S. representative from Florida. She was chairwoman of the House Foreign Affairs Committee from 2011–2013. In 1989, she won a special election becoming the first Cuban American elected to Congress. She was also the first Republican woman elected to the House from Florida. Ros-Lehtinen gave the first Republican response to the State of the Union address in Spanish in 2011, and gave the third in 2014.

In September 2011, Ros-Lehtinen became the first Republican member of the U.S. Congress to co-sponsor the Respect for Marriage Act, which would repeal the Defense of Marriage Act. In July 2012, she became the first Republican in the House to support same-sex marriage.

On April 30, 2017, Ros-Lehtinen announced that she would not be running for re-election in 2018.

== Early life and education ==
Ileana Ros y Adato was born in Havana, Cuba one of two children born to Enrique Ros (1924–2013), who later became a businessman and an anti–Fidel Castro activist, and his wife, Amanda Adato. The family immigrated to the United States when Ileana was seven years old. She graduated from Southwest Miami Senior High School in Miami. She received her Bachelor of Arts degree in education and her Master of Arts degree in educational leadership from Florida International University in Westchester. She attended the University of Miami in Coral Gables, earning an Ed.D degree in higher education.

Ileana Ros-Lehtinen grew up Catholic and is now an Episcopalian. Her maternal grandparents were Sephardic Jews, originally from the Ottoman Empire, who had been active in Cuba's Jewish community. Her maternal grandfather left the city of Kırklareli for Cuba in 1913, fleeing the devastation and economic collapse caused by the First Balkan War. Her mother later converted to Catholicism to marry her father.

== Career ==
Ros-Lehtinen was an educator and the owner/operator of a private school in Miami-Dade County. She was elected to the Florida House of Representatives in 1982, where she met state Representative Dexter Lehtinen (D-Miami). They married on June 9, 1984, after he switched parties. They both served in the State House until 1986. In 1986, they were both elected to the Florida Senate, where he was elected to District 40 and she was elected in District 34. In 1988, Lehtinen resigned his seat to become U.S. Attorney of South Florida. In 1989, Ros-Lehtinen resigned her seat to become a U.S. representative.

=== U.S. House of Representatives ===
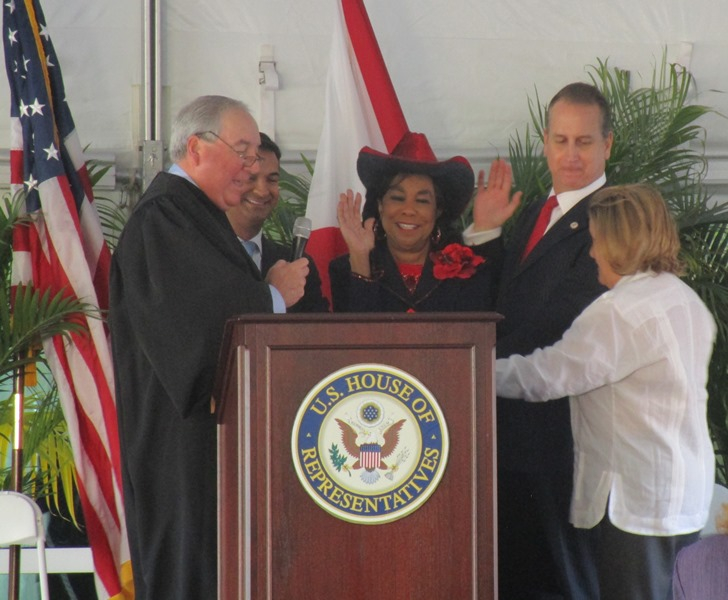
Ros-Lehtinen (right) being sworn in as a member of Congress by Chief Judge Kevin Michael Moore (left), along with Florida colleagues Carlos Curbelo, Frederica Wilson, and Mario Díaz-Balart in February 2015

After incumbent Democratic U.S. Congressman Claude Pepper died on May 30, 1989, there was a special election scheduled for August 29, 1989. State Senator Ros-Lehtinen defeated Democrat Gerald Richman 53%–47%. She was the first Cuban American elected to the United States Congress and the first Republican woman elected from Florida. Upon her election, Ros-Lehtinen was incorrectly informed that she was also the first Latina elected to Congress, the first having been Rep. Barbara Vucanovich, who was of partial Mexican descent and was elected in 1982. In 1990, she won re-election to a full term with 60% of the vote. In total, she was elected to fourteen full terms, never winning with less than 58%.

Ros-Lehtinen joined Majority Leader Steny Hoyer (D-Maryland) on a congressional delegation to the United Nations in order to encourage international support for an end to the genocide in Darfur. In addition, when Ros-Lehtinen returned from a trip to Darfur in April 2007 where she visited Sudanese refugee camps, she strongly encouraged the United States and the international community to find a solution to this humanitarian crisis.

After the 2008 elections, then President-elect Barack Obama rang Ros-Lehtinen to congratulate her on her re-election. She hung up on him, believing that it was a prank call from a radio station. She did the same to Obama's chief of staff Rahm Emanuel when he rang to confirm the original call was genuine, and only accepted the call after Congressman Howard Berman managed to speak to her.

Ros-Lehtinen played a key role in keeping the International Protecting Girls by Preventing Child Marriage Act of 2010 from being passed into law. Although the bill had unanimously passed the Senate with bipartisan support, she persuaded enough Republicans in the House to vote against the bill so that it did not receive the required two-thirds majority. She reportedly invoked concerns about the legislation's cost and that funds could be used to promote abortion.

Ros-Lehtinen was the chairwoman of the House Foreign Affairs Committee from 2011–2013. During the 2011 Libyan civil war, she expressed support of the Libyan opposition; on February 26, 2011, she released a press release which stated, "stronger penalties must be imposed in order to hold the regime accountable for its heinous crimes, and to prevent further violence against the Libyan people". But on March 20, 2011, the day after the NATO strikes to enforce the no-fly-zone began, she expressed a different view in a press release: "I am concerned that the President has yet to clearly define for the American people what vital United States security interests he believes are currently at stake in Libya." The congresswoman has also been a forerunner in cutting U.S. aid to foreign lands, including the State Department, The Peace Corps, the Asia Foundation, the U.S. Institute of Peace and the East–West Center. She also advocates cutting funding to Lebanese Armed Forces and the West Bank and Gaza.

After comments by State Department over Israeli settlements, she demanded that the Obama administration halt its "condemnations" of "an indispensable ally and friend of the United States." In September 2011, she introduced a bill to cut off US funding to any UN organization which recognizes Palestinian statehood. Ros-Lehtinen has been an opponent of funding for the Peace Corps. In 2011, she led a hearing about the perils that volunteers faced and the lack of concern for victims of sexual abuse while serving. Ros-Lehtinen pressured the State Department to accelerate its processing of passports, something that had hindered American citizens' travel during the crucial summer travel season. Calling the delay "outrageous, incomprehensible, unconscionable" at a hearing of the House Foreign Affairs Committee, where she is chairwoman, Ros-Lehtinen brought the pressure of committee Republicans to bear on the State Department's Bureau of Consular Affairs and spur them to action.

On May 7, 2014, Ros-Lehtinen introduced the Venezuelan Human Rights and Democracy Protection Act (H.R. 4587; 113th Congress) in the House. The bill would impose sanctions against Venezuela and authorize appropriations to support civil society in that country. The sanctions would be directed at any government official who was involved in the mistreatment of protestors. She said that the bill was to "condemn the ongoing human rights abuses being committed in Venezuela, and to answer the cries of the people of Venezuela." Ros-Lehtinen also said that she was "pleased that the House of Representatives has acted to punish the thugs of the Maduro regime for brutally repressing and violating the human rights of those seeking to exercise their basic freedoms of speech and assembly in Venezuela."

She was a member of the Republican Main Street Partnership. In 1993, Ros-Lehtinen became one of the first three women to play in the annual Congressional Baseball Game, alongside Blanche Lincoln (then under her maiden name Lambert) and Maria Cantwell.

=== Committee assignments ===
- Committee on Foreign Affairs (Chair, 2011–2013)

=== Caucus membership ===
- Co-chair, Congressional Vision Caucus
- Co-chair, National Marine Sanctuary Caucus
- Congressional Pro-Life Women's Caucus
- Climate Solutions Caucus
- Congressional Taiwan Caucus
- Congressional Hispanic Conference
- United States Congressional International Conservation Caucus
- Congressional Arts Caucus
- Afterschool Caucuses
- Problem Solvers Caucus

=== Notable campaign contributors ===
A major individual campaign contributor to Ros-Lehtinen is Irving Moskowitz, a funder of Israeli settlements in the West Bank and East Jerusalem. J Street, a lobby group, called on Ros-Lehtinen to return campaign contributions from Moskowitz and said that he "actively undermines the two-state solution and the foreign policy of the United States by funding illegal settlements in the occupied territories". American Council on World Jewry president Jack Rosen expressed "great concern" about the demand.

== Political positions ==
A leading Republican moderate, Ros-Lehtinen opposed Donald Trump's 2016 presidential candidacy. In April 2017, she called on President Trump to remove Steve Bannon from his position as the chief strategist in the Trump administration. As of May 2018, Ros-Lehtinen had voted with her party in 85.7% of votes in the 115th United States Congress and voted in line with President Trump's position in 68.7% of the votes.

The National Journal, as cited in the Almanac of American Politics 2016, gave Ros-Lehtinen a composite score of 54% conservative and 46% liberal. She was ranked as the sixth most bipartisan member of the U.S. House of Representatives during the 114th United States Congress in the Bipartisan Index, created by The Lugar Center and the McCourt School of Public Policy to assess congressional bipartisanship. During the first session of the 115th United States Congress, Ros-Lehtinen's ranking improved to second.

=== Economic issues ===
She signed the Taxpayer Protection Pledge. Ros-Lehtinen voted against the Emergency Economic Stabilization Act of 2008 in its initial September 29, 2008 vote, which failed, but voted in favor of the revised bill in its October 3, 2008 vote, which passed. In February 2017, she voted against a resolution which would have directed the House to request 10 years of Trump's tax returns, which would then have been reviewed by the House Ways and Means Committee in a closed session. Ros-Lehtinen voted in favor of the Tax Cuts and Jobs Act of 2017. According to one estimate, 39,900 of Ros-Lehtinen's constituents could lose their health insurance in 2019 due to the bill's passage.

=== Foreign policy ===
Ros-Lehtinen was rated 57% conservative and 43% liberal on foreign policy issues by the National Journal. She supported President George W. Bush's surge policy in Iraq, supports Israel, and is in favor of continued sanctions against Cuba. She supported the de facto government in Honduras, headed by Roberto Micheletti, that emerged after the military coup against President Manuel Zelaya. Speaking of the decision to invade Iraq: "Whether or not there is a direct link to the World Trade Center does not mean that Iraq is not meritorious of shedding blood. The common link is that they hate America."

On November 23, 2010, she called on the Obama administration to "announce publicly, right now, that we will stay away from Durban III, deny it US taxpayer dollars, and oppose all measures that seek to facilitate it... we should encourage other responsible nations to do the same." Ros-Lehtinen opposes US support to the United Nations Relief and Works Agency for Palestine Refugees in the Near East and the Palestinian Authority. She says that she is a "strong supporter of Israel" and regards the U.S. relationship with Israel as "critical to the national security interests of both nations". She supported President Donald Trump's decision to recognize Jerusalem as Israel's capital.

==== Cuba ====
Ros-Lehtinen played a prominent role in the Cuban-American lobby, which puts pressure on the Cuban government to bring about political change in Cuba. She was a member of the Congressional Cuba Democracy Caucus. She also advanced strongly held views on Cuba, and lobbied against ending the United States embargo against the country. In 2004 she formed the Cuba Democracy Group aimed at curtailing U.S. agriculture exports and preventing U.S. banks from doing business with the Cuban government.

Ros-Lehtinen has defended former fugitive Velentin Hernández, convicted of murdering Luciano Nieves, a fellow Cuban exile who supported negotiations with the Cuban government, In the 1980s, she lobbied for the release and pardon of Cuban exile Orlando Bosch, who had been convicted of terrorist acts and has been accused of involvement in the 1976 bombing of Cubana Flight 455, which killed 73 people, helping organize an "Orlando Bosch day" to gain support for his release. Ros-Lehtinen played a prominent role in the unsuccessful attempt by relatives of Elian Gonzalez to gain custody of six-year-old from the Castro regime, calling Cuba "that system of godless communism". She also attempted to block Jimmy Carter's visit to the island in 2002.

Ros-Lehtinen stirred controversy by calling for the assassination of Cuban leader Fidel Castro. She appeared in a British documentary entitled 638 Ways to Kill Castro, saying: "I welcome the opportunity of having anyone assassinate Fidel Castro and any leader who is oppressing the people." After a 28-second clip began circulating on the Internet, she claimed the filmmakers spliced clips together to get the sound bite. Twenty-four hours after the controversy erupted, director Dollan Cannell sent unedited tapes of his interview with Ros-Lehtinen to reporters. The uncut version contradicted her response, showing she had twice welcomed an attempt on Castro's life. Although she attempted to distance herself from her denial, Cannell requested an apology.

=== Immigration and refugees ===
Ros-Lehtinen opposed President Donald Trump's 2017 executive order to temporarily curtail Muslim immigration until better screening methods are devised. She said, "I object to the suspension of visas from the seven named countries because we could have accomplished our objective of keeping our homeland safe by immediate implementation of more thorough screening procedures."

=== Abortion ===
In 2003, she received a 0% rating from NARAL Pro-Choice America. In 2006, she received a 100% rating from the National Right to Life Committee for her abortion-related voting record. She is against allowing federal funds and federal health coverage for abortions. She wants to stop embryonic stem cell research. She has voted to make it a crime to harm a fetus while committing a crime. She is against partial-birth abortions unless it is necessary to save the mother's life. She has voted to ban minors from being transported to receive an abortion and wants to prohibit minors from traveling over state lines for abortions.

=== LGBT issues ===
Ros-Lehtinen has been a notable Republican voice in favor of LGBT rights. In a Winter 2013 interview with the Human Rights Campaign, she said that her support for same-sex marriage was based on "coming from Cuba, losing my homeland to communism, seeing the state control everything—I'm a person that believes in individual liberties and not having the government control everything." When asked about her support for her son Rodrigo, a transgender LGBT rights advocate, she commented:

It's important for families to support their children and to support their children's choices. It's important to listen to your children, accept your children and have your children know that you love them unconditionally. It's not "I love you, but ..."—there's no "but." "It's just "I love you."... To do otherwise is—you're hurting yourself, you're going to shun your child or grandchild. You're going to say, "No, I have my views and my views are the perfect views and no one can have a different point of view. I'm right and everything else is wrong... that's a lonely way to live. It just means you'll be out of that person's life, and who wants to be cut out of their child's life?

Although Ros-Lehtinen voted for the Defense of Marriage Act in 1996, she began to support LGBT issues over the next decade (due in part to her district, which includes large LGBT populations in South Beach in Miami Beach and in the Florida Keys, as well as Rodrigo coming out). She was one of three Republican members of the LGBT Equality Caucus, of which she is a founding member and a vice-chairwoman. While she is not a co-sponsor of the Uniting American Families Act, she supports anti-hate crime laws, anti-discrimination bills, believes gays and lesbians should be allowed to serve openly in the armed forces, is a sponsor of the Domestic Partnership Benefits and Obligations Act, and voted against the Federal Marriage Amendment. She was one of fifteen Republican House members to vote in favor of the Don't Ask, Don't Tell Repeal Act of 2010, and was the first Republican cosponsor of the bill.

In September 2011, Ros-Lehtinen became the first Republican member of the U.S. Congress to co-sponsor the Respect for Marriage Act, and signed on to a letter to IRS Commissioner Schulman requesting that the IRS provide clear guidance for LGBT taxpayers. The letter asks the IRS to ensure that tax law is being applied fairly to all individuals. In July 2012, she became the first Republican in the House to fully support same-sex marriage. In 2013, she was a signatory to an amicus curiae brief submitted to the Supreme Court in support of same-sex marriage during the Hollingsworth v. Perry case.

== Post-congressional career ==
Ros-Lehtinen has remained active in politics since leaving office, endorsing the Republican campaign of María Elvira Salazar for her old congressional seat in 2020. She donated to the congressional reelection campaign of Democrat Frederica Wilson in 2022.

=== Lobbying career ===
After leaving Congress, Ros-Lehtinen was hired by the lobbying firm Akin Gump Strauss Hauer & Feld (Akin Gump). In 2024, she was among the Akin Gump lobbyists hired by Nippon Steel to navigate the proposed acquisition of U.S. Steel.

==== United Arab Emirates lobbying controversy ====
At Akin Gump, she has worked as a foreign agent for the government of the United Arab Emirates. In July 2020, she was involved in the Emirates’ attempt of defaming the regional rival Qatar, where a report of 124 pages was published by her. Entitled Report Concerning Qatar’s Al Jazeera Media Network & The Foreign Agents Registration Act, the report submitted to the FARA claimed that the media agency Al Jazeera was funded, owned, directed and controlled by Qatar. Both the lobbying firm and Ros were putting efforts on behalf of the UAE to crush the global influence of Al Jazeera.

=== Department of Justice investigation ===
In September 2020, the U.S. Department of Justice’s Public Integrity Section opened an investigation into allegations against Ileana Ros that she misused campaign funds. She allegedly used the funds for personal expenses and vacations, where expense reports from a political action committee showed $4,000 spent on a trip to Walt Disney World in Orlando, Florida with family in December 2017 and another transaction of $3,100 at a restaurant on New Year's Eve in 2018.

== Personal life ==
In 1984, Ros-Lehtinen married Dexter Lehtinen, a former attorney for the U.S. District Court for the Southern District and they have two children, Rodrigo, a transgender LGBT rights activist, and Patricia Marie. She is the step-mother of Katherine and Douglas Lehtinen. She is an Episcopalian.

== Awards ==
- Taiwan: Order of Propitious Clouds with Special Grand Cordon (2018).

U.S. House of Representatives
Preceded by Claude Pepper	Member of the U.S. House of Representatives from Florida's 18th congressional district 1989–2013	Succeeded by Patrick Murphy
Preceded by Mario Díaz-Balart	Chair of the Congressional Hispanic Conference; 2005–2007	Succeeded by Luis Fortuño
Preceded by Tom Lantos	Ranking Member of House Foreign Affairs Committee; 2007–2011	Succeeded by Howard Berman
New constituency	Member of the U.S. House of Representatives from Florida's 27th congressional district 2013–2019	Succeeded by Donna Shalala
Preceded by Howard Berman	Chair of House Foreign Affairs Committee; 2011–2013	Succeeded by Ed Royce
U.S. order of precedence (ceremonial)
Preceded by Bobby Rush as Former U.S. representative	Order of precedence of the United States as Former U.S. representative	Succeeded by Howard Berman as Former U.S. representative
