= Stephen Zetterberg =

American attorney

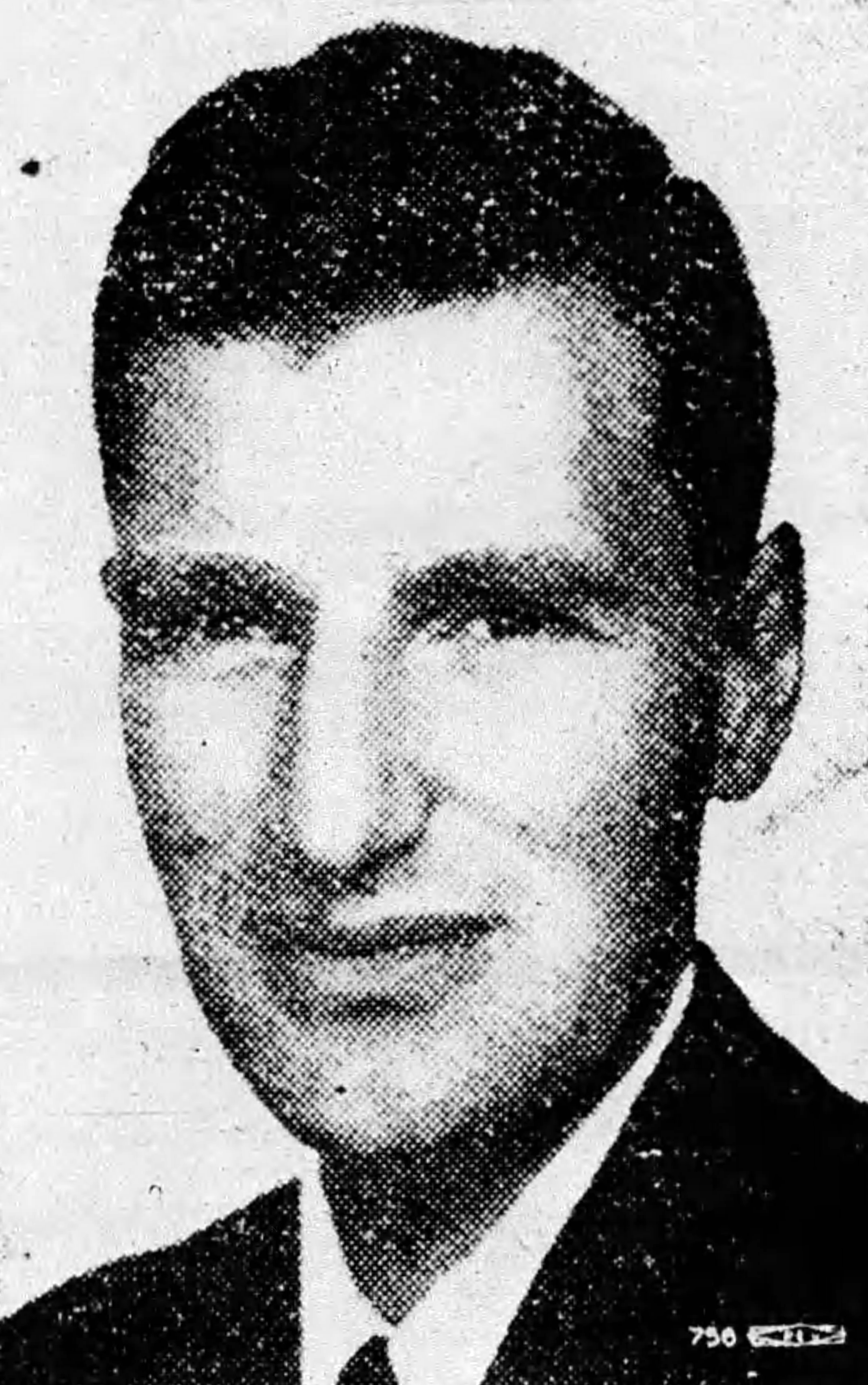
- Zetterberg c. 1948
- Born: October 2, 1916; Galesburg, Illinois, U.S.
- Died: January 30, 2009 (aged 92)

Stephen Ingersoll Zetterberg (October 2, 1916 – January 30, 2009) was an American attorney and Democratic activist. Zetterberg was best known for being defeated by Congressman Richard Nixon in the Democratic primary for the 1948 California's 12th congressional district election, as Nixon, having no Republican primary opposition, entered the Democratic primary to ensure he would have no Democratic opponent in the general election.

== Early life ==
Zetterberg was born on October 2, 1916, in Galesburg, Illinois. He grew up in New Castle, Indiana, moving to Claremont, California as a teenager. He went to college locally at Pomona College, serving in the United States Coast Guard during World War II. After the war ended, he worked as a congressional staffer for United States Senator Scott W. Lucas (D-Ill.).

== Political career ==
In 1946, Zetterberg returned to Claremont to practice law, and involved himself in local politics. Elected chairman of a local committee seeking to manage growth in the area, Zetterberg urged former congressman Jerry Voorhis, defeated by Nixon in 1946, to run again in 1948. Voorhis declined, citing health reasons, and Zetterberg decided to run in the Democratic primary instead. To attract attention to his campaign, he organized square dances. Nixon refused to debate Zetterberg.

Zetterberg filed for the race on March 23, 1948, just over two months before the June 1 primary, but his commitments as an attorney kept him busy until mid-April. He did not start to campaign even then, but waited until a month before the primary. Zetterberg was underfinanced in the campaign, spending less than $2,000.

At the time, California law permitted candidates to run in both major parties' primaries, a practice known as "cross-filing." In an attempt to assure himself of no major party opposition on the general election ballot, Nixon, who was facing no Republican opposition, also entered the Democratic primary. Under instructions from the Nixon campaign, a group called "Democrats for Nixon" sent out postcards addressed to "Fellow Democrats". Under California law at the time, the incumbent was listed first on the ballot, and was identified as such. According to Zetterberg in a 1972 interview, some voters showed him their sample ballots, convinced Nixon was the Democratic incumbent.

Cross-filing was hardly unusual in California. In 1946, Governor Earl Warren, several state officers, twelve of the twenty-three members of the House of Representatives, and much of the State Legislature had secured election by cross-filing. In 1946, both Nixon and Voorhis had cross filed, each unsuccessfully.

Zetterberg refused to take the obvious retaliatory step of running also in the Republican primary, deeming it hypocritical. Zetterberg received 16,808 votes in the Democratic primary to Nixon's 21,411, while a third candidate attracted 2,772, and Nixon was re-elected in November with 86.9 percent of the vote, facing only minor party candidates. A few Nixon biographers have stated that had Nixon and Zetterberg met in the general election, Nixon could have been defeated in an election in which President Harry S. Truman was re-elected and the Democrats picked up seats in the California delegation to the House of Representatives. Other scholars deem that hypothetical outcome as highly unlikely as Truman lost Nixon's conservative district to Gov. Thomas Dewey, the Republican candidate for president, and Nixon had proven himself to be a strong fundraiser and campaigner.

Nixon biographer Irwin Gellman criticized Zetterberg's performance in the race, stating that Zetterberg did not appear actively involved in the race, nor did he spend enough money on campaign necessities such as posters and stickers Nixon would use similar techniques two years later in his Senate campaign against Representative Helen Gahagan Douglas. This time, the Democrats focused attention on his actions and coined the sobriquet "Tricky Dick" for Nixon. With Nixon running for the Senate, Zetterberg ran again for the House, this time cross-filing and winning the Democratic nomination, but was defeated in the general election by Republican Patrick Hillings by a 60% to 40% tally. Cross-filing was abolished in California in 1959.

1950 U.S. House election, California Congressional District 12
Party	Candidate	Votes	%
Republican	Patrick Hillings	107,933	60
Democratic	Stephen Zetterberg	71,682	40

== Later years ==
Zetterberg remained active in politics, serving on a governor's task force on health. He continued the practice of law until 2008, and audited courses at Pomona College until his mid 80s. Zetterberg served on the boards of the Pomona Valley YMCA and Casa Colina, a Pomona rehabilitation hospital. His wife, the former Connie Lyon, died in 2007 after the two had been married for 67 years. Zetterberg was survived by three sons and a daughter.

== Bibliography ==
- Stephen Zetterberg, Oral History Interviews, California State Archives, 1990-1993
- Gellman, Irwin (1999), The Contender, The Free Press, ISBN 978-1-4165-7255-8
