= Elicio Argüelles Pozo =

Cuban Senator

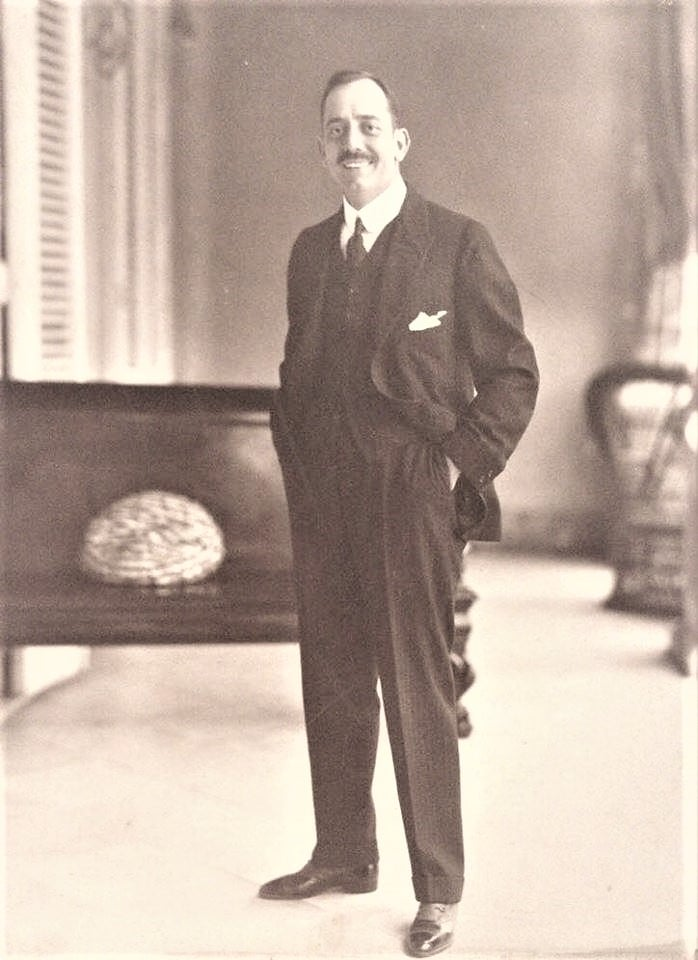

Cuban Senator
- In office July 14, 1940 – 1944
- Constituency: Pinar del Río

President of the Cuban Senate

Personal details
- Born: 1885; Guane, Cuba
- Died: January 16, 1959; Havana
- Political party: Partido Demócrata Republicano (PDR)
- Children: Elicio Argüelles Menocal
- Awards: Grand Cross of the Order of Isabella the Catholic

Elicio Argüelles y Pozo was a Cuban Senator and President of the Senate. During the Spanish Civil War, he was the president of the Comité Nacionalista Español (CNE), a Cuban organization dedicated to the Carlist and Falangist ideologies of the Nationalist faction. At the conclusion of the war, he was awarded the Grand Cross of the Order of Isabella the Catholic by Francisco Franco for his services to Spain. The historian Allan Chase writes that Argüelles was a blue-blood landowner who was in charge of the CNE cell "A-1," alongside his friend José Ignacio Rivero Alonso, who headed the cell "R-1." Argüelles and his son, Elicio Argüelles II, were good family friends of Ernest Hemingway, and met him at a Jai alai game. Argüelles owned the Frontón Jai Alai, the largest Jai Alai arena in Hanava.
