= 1948 California's 12th congressional district election =

- November 2, 1948
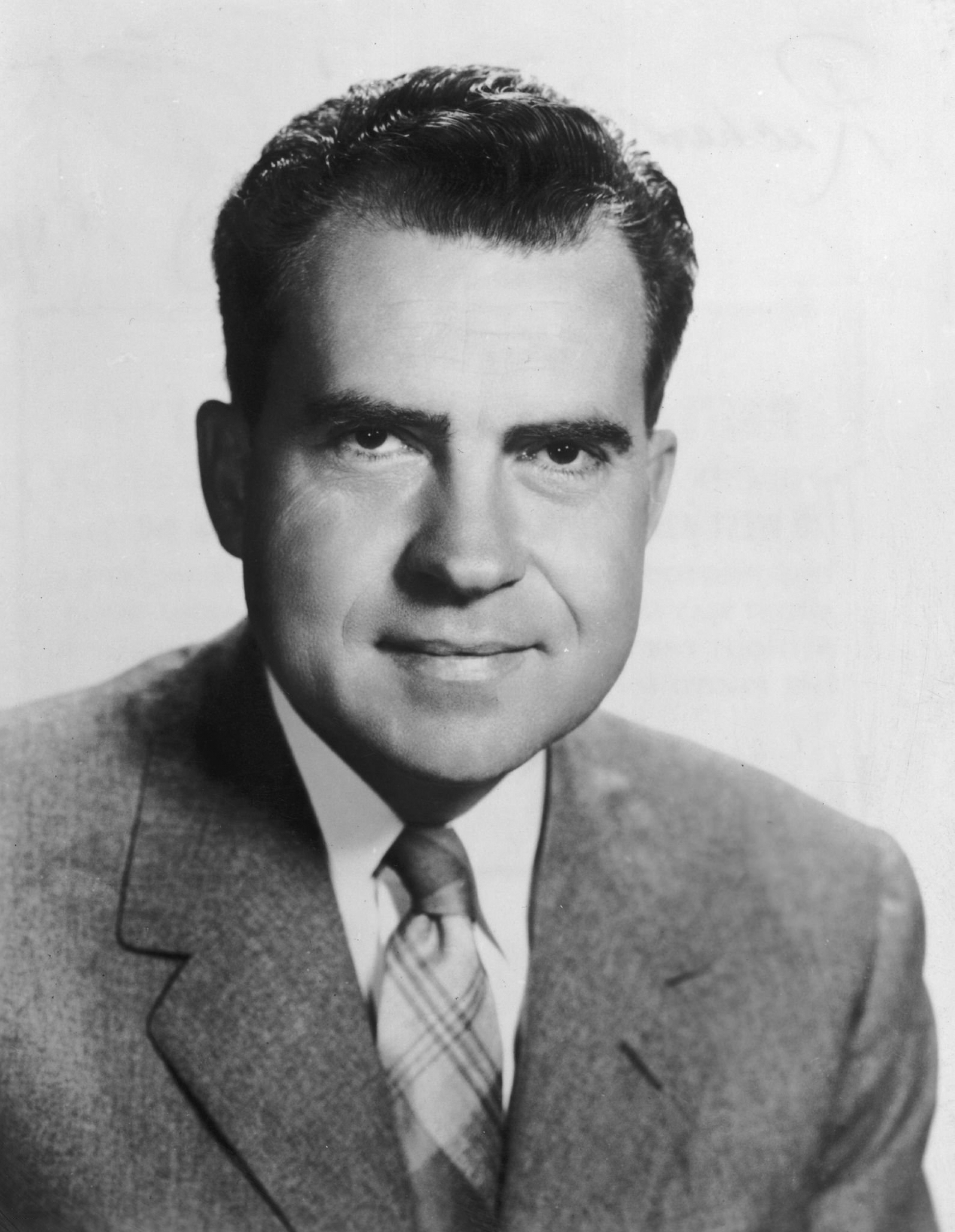

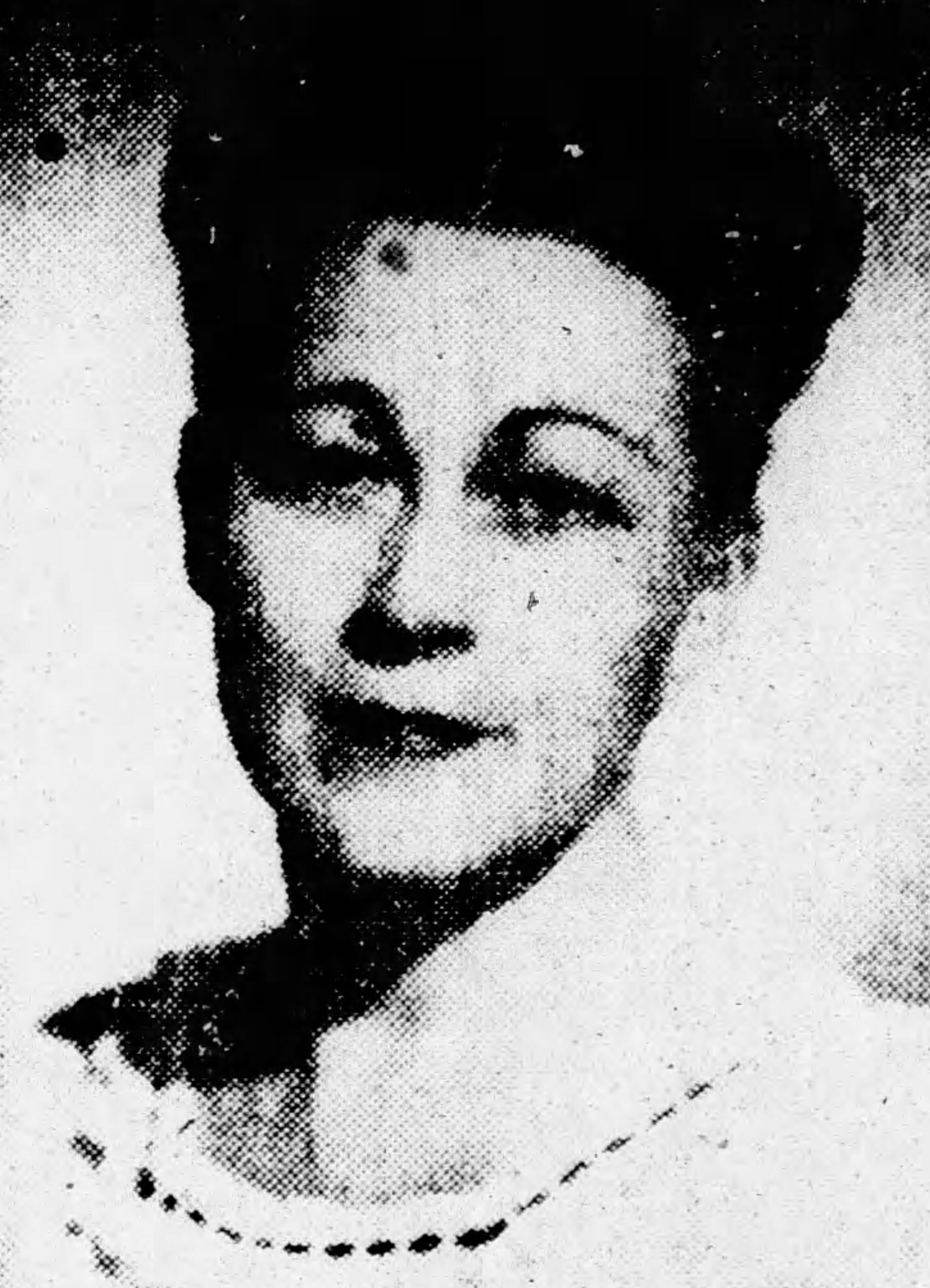
| Nominee | Richard Nixon | Una W. Rice |
| Party | Republican | Progressive |
| Alliance | Democratic |
| Popular vote | 141,509 | 19,631 |
| Percentage | 86.92% | 12.06% |
U.S. Representative before election
Richard Nixon
Republican
Elected U.S. Representative
Richard Nixon
Republican

An election for a seat in the United States House of Representatives took place in California's 12th congressional district on November 2, 1948, the date set by law for the elections for the 81st United States Congress. In the 12th district election, the candidates were one-term incumbent Republican Richard Nixon, and Progressive challenger Una W. Rice. Nixon was reelected with 87% of the vote.

== Election ==
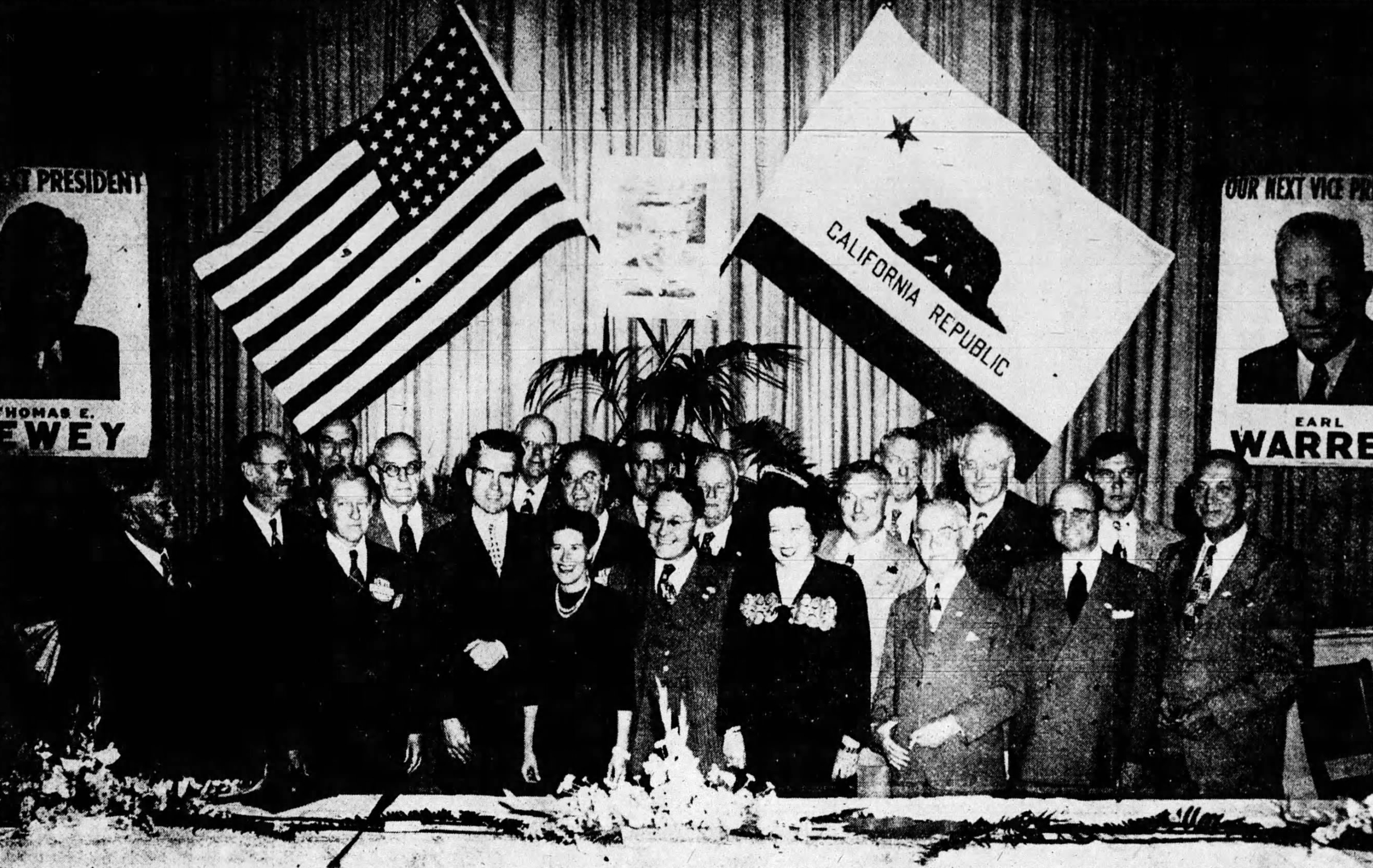
Nixon at a dinner hosted by the South Pasadena Republican Club, October 15, 1948

In June, Nixon won the Republican primary uncontested, as well as the Democratic primary, defeating attorney Stephen I. Zetterberg and Margaret B. Porter. Nixon would have gone on to the general election without an opponent, but because no members of the Independent Progressive Party ran in the primary, the party was later able to select Rosemead housewife Una W. Rice as its candidate.

Rice boasted endorsements from the Pomona AFL Central labor Council, the Los Angeles CIO-PAC, and the California State Brotherhood of Locomotive Firemen and Enginemen. In a statement published in the Daily Worker, she declared:

I have held no public office, but neither had Mr. Nixon before he was elected two years ago. And if I can't do a better job for my district than my present congressman, then I don't know how I've been able to solve the problems of managing my household and raising a family."

For his part, Nixon was so sure of his victory that he took time out of his own campaign to go on a nationwide speaking tour for Republican Presidential candidate Thomas E. Dewey. Nixon spent election night with his family at the Ambassador Hotel's Cocoanut Grove, where he was invited onstage by singer Hildegarde. He was ultimately reelected in a landslide.

=== Results ===
California's 12th congressional district election, 1946
| Party | Candidate | Votes | % |
|---|---|---|---|
| Republican | Richard Nixon (incumbent) | 141,509 | 86.92 |
| Progressive | Una W. Rice | 19,631 | 12.06 |
| Scattering | | 1,667 | 1.02 |
| Total votes | | 162,807 | 100.0 |
| Republican hold | | | |
