= Havana Jai alai =

Historic building in Havana, Cuba

Jai-alai fronton
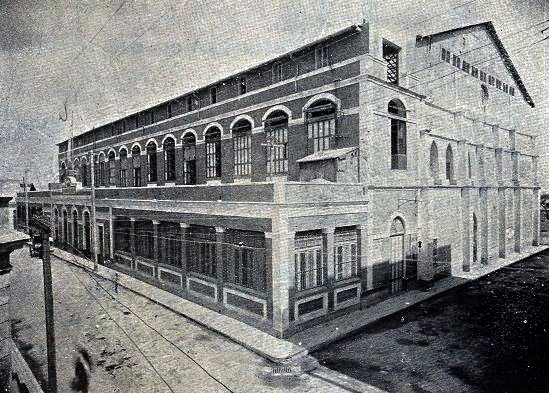
- Calles Concordia and Lucenas
- Interactive map of the Jai-alai fronton area
- Alternative names: Palacio de los gritos

General information
- Status: Abandoned, partly destroyed
- Type: Sports
- Architectural style: Neo classical
- Location: 421 Concordia and Lucena, Havana, Cuba
- Coordinates: 23.1382°N 82.3714°W
- Inaugurated: 10 March 1901
- Closed: 1 January 1959
- Owner: Mazzatini brothers

Height
- Tip: 70 feet (21 m)
- Top floor: 40 feet (12 m)

Technical details
- Structural system: Concrete, masonry, metal columns, metal trusses
- Material: Concrete, masonry infill
- Size: 140 ft × 227.5 ft (42.7 m × 69.3 m)
- Floor count: 3
- Floor area: 31,850 sq ft (2,959 m^{2})

Design and construction
- Known for: Havana jai alai

Jai alai fronton, also known as the Palacio de los Gritos ("Palace of Screams"), is an abandoned jai alai court in Havana, Cuba. Located at the corner of Calles Concordia and Lucena in the neighborhood of Centro Habana, it was inaugurated on 10 March 1901 and remained active until 1 January 1959. Promoted by the Spanish-born Mazzantini brothers, the fronton quickly became a major venue for Basque pelota in the Americas and a focal point of Havana’s early 20th-century sporting culture. The venue earned its nickname from the intense shouting of fans and bettors during matches. Today, the structure stands partially in ruins and has been annexed by residential construction, but remains a notable landmark in the urban and cultural history of Havana.

It is located behind the Hermanos Ameijeiras Hospital, on the site of the former Casa de Beneficencia, at the intersection of Calles Concordia and Lucenas near Calle Belascoain. It is in an area that had been considered in the early part of the city as a place to locate the helpless and the unwanted (Casa de Beneficencia, Hospital de San Lázaro, the Espada Cemetery, Casa de Dementes de San Dionisio), it was the edge of the city and the countryside known as the "basurero"; the spectator stands were parallel to Calle Concordia, the front wall of the court faced Calle Lucenas, east in the direction towards Old Havana.

== History ==
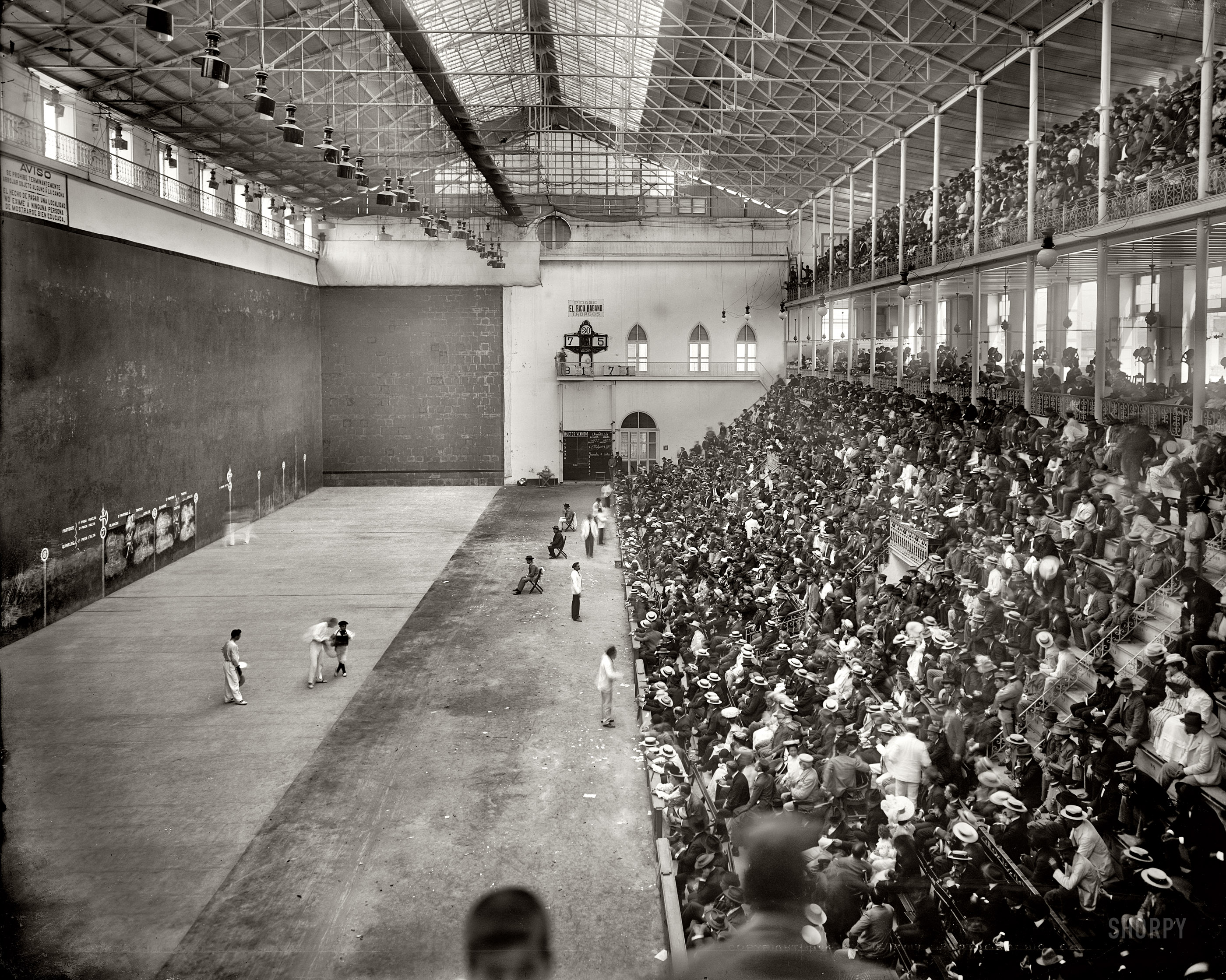
Frontón de Jai Alai, La Habana, 1904

In April 1898, the Mazzatini brothers made their first request to erect a building for Jai Alai and was approved, the Cuban War of Independence, however, delayed the process. In 1900 the Mazzatini brothers returned to the project, this time they received all the facilities from the municipal government, leaving the final approval of said approval in the hands of Colonel of the North American Army of intervention Dudley. The Havana Jai Alai Fronton, promoted by the Mazzantini brothers, was inaugurated in 1901 through their lawyer Basilio Sarasqueta with the support of Spanish fans. The military man refused up to 3 times, stating that it was impossible for him to sign a ten-year contract that would assign civil government land for private use. On March 3, 1901, the Jai Alai frontón was inaugurated on a plot of land bounded by the Calles Concordia y Lucena.

== "El Palacio de los Gritos" ==
Was the name by which the fans, and the rest of the population of Havana, knew the fronton of Jai-Alai, on the other hand, the players called it "El Matadero" (the killing field), because of how extreme it was to play there; the level and pressure were so high that for years it was considered the center of Basque pelota in America.

The term Jai Alai to refer to Basque pelota is attributed to Pío Baroja, who, when watching a game, called it "Jai Alai" (happy game in Basque). On the other hand, the term "Palacio de los Gritos" is attributed to Víctor Muñoz, a journalist of the time who Spanishized numerous terms in American and European sports. The interest in attracting new bettors was efficient and the Palace of Screams became even more hysterical, the players tried to listen to their personal bettors, those close to the track yelling at them where to shoot to fool their rivals. Of course, everyone yelled at his own, and at the bettors who went from one side of the stands to the other, making it impossible to understand the tactical instructions.

== Society ==
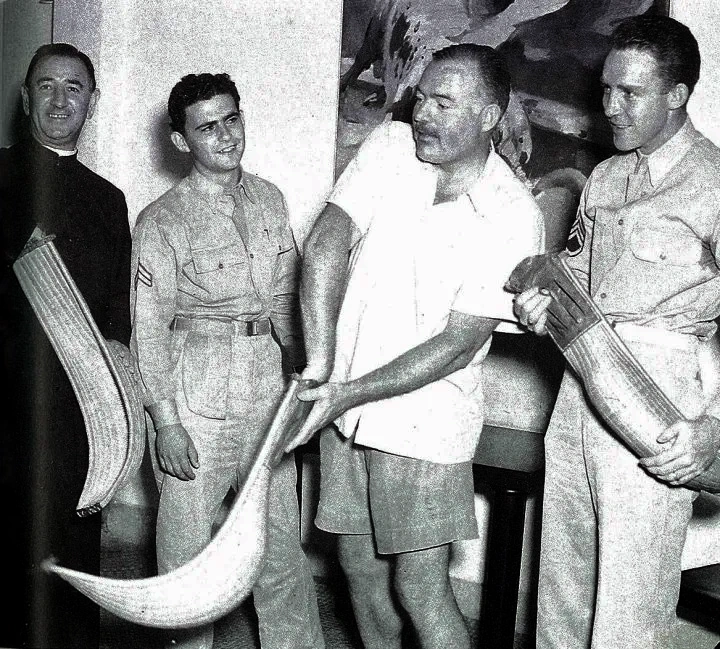
Andrés Unzain, the “Red Priest from Mundaka,” with Hemingway in Havana.

Among the visitors is Ernest Hemingway, (Note: Father Andrés Unzáin, the Red Priest, as the right-wing Spaniards and reactionary Cuban press called him, was a priest in Spain during the war against fascism and, when necessary, the leader of the Gudari Basque machine gun battalion. After breaking with the Spanish Catholic clergy, after Franco came to power, Father Andrés went to Cuba, where he received a parish in the town of Melena del Sur. The priest’s liberalism, his hatred of fascism, and his special way with many mundane matters quickly brought him close to Hemingway. Soon, Father Andrés was a frequent guest at La Vigía.) some photos attest to this, who made a great friendship with Guillermo Amuchastegui, the Ondarroa phenomenon, who became a regular in Havana who made a great friendship with Guillermo Amuchastegui, the Ondarroa phenomenon, who became a regular in Havana's high society of the time. It was not uncommon to see a multitude of ladies of the time go to the fronton with their best clothes. Another fan of the Palace of Screams was Babe Ruth who according to the gossips left about $10,000 in gambling and an injury for trying to play the "fastest sport in the world" as the press called the top basket.

== The Basques ==
The Basques exported the game from ca. 1800 to all parts of the world including the Americas. Jai alai (/ˈhaɪ.əlaɪ/: [ˈxai aˈlai]) is normally played with a ball that is bounced off of the floor and three walls accelerated to high speeds with a wicker hand-held device called a (Cesta). A sport played in Spain, southwest of France and Latin American countries, it is a variation of Basque pelota, a term, coined by Serafin Baroja in 1875, is also often loosely applied to the fronton (the open-walled playing area) where the sport is played. The game is called "zesta-punta" (basket tip) in Basque.

== Rules and customs ==
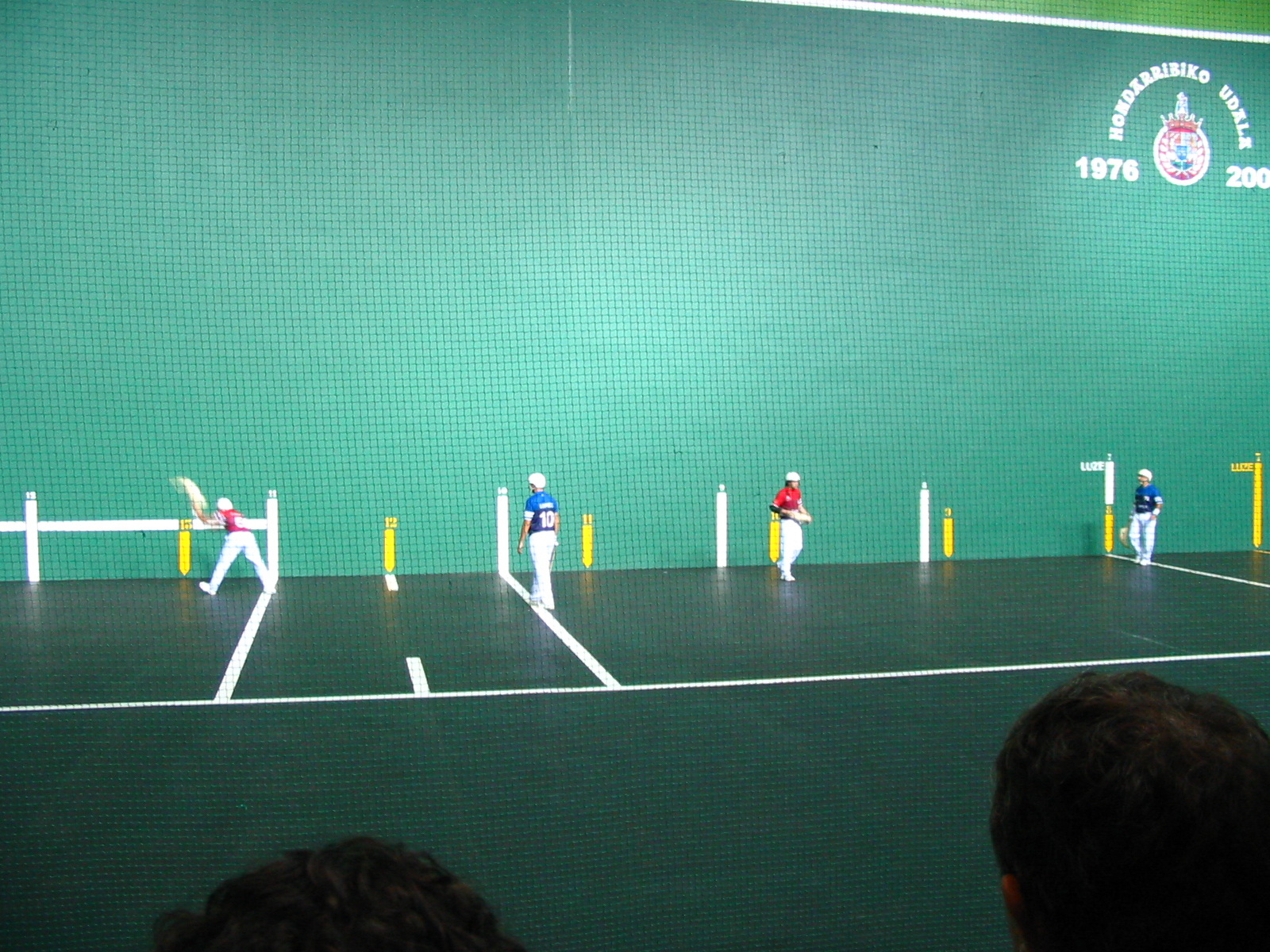
Jai_alai_court

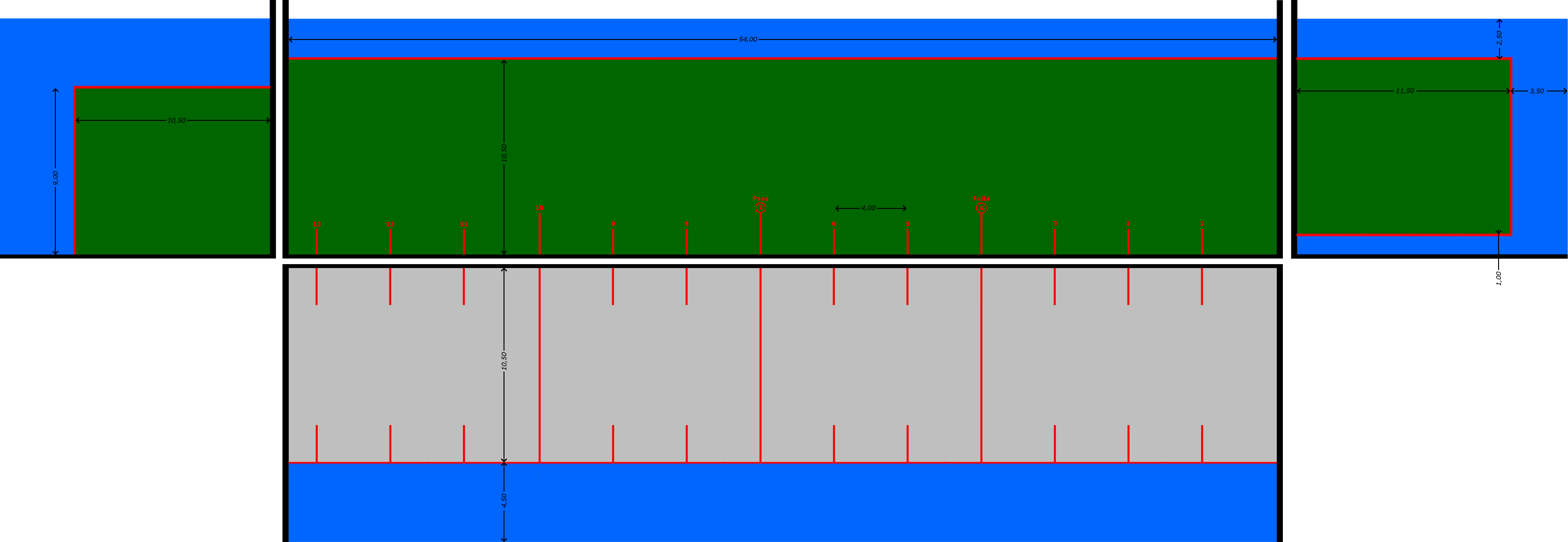
Plan_jai_alai, front and rear walls_jai_alai court

The court for jai alai consists of walls on the front, back and left, and the floor between them. If the ball (called a pelota in Spanish, pilota in Standard Basque) touches the floor outside these walls, it is considered out of bounds. Similarly, there is also a border on the lower 3 feet (0.9 m) of the front wall that is also out of bounds. The ceiling on the court is usually very high, so the ball has a more predictable path. The court is divided by 14 parallel lines going horizontally across the court, with line 1 closest to the front wall and line 14 the back wall. In doubles, each team consists of a frontcourt player and a backcourt player. The game begins when the frontcourt player of the first team serves the ball to the second team. The winner of each point stays on the court to meet the next team in rotation. Losers go to the end of the line to await another turn on the court. The first team to score 7 points (or 9 in Superfecta games) wins. The next highest scores are awarded "place" (second) and "show" (third) positions, respectively. Playoffs decide tied scores.

=== Round robin ===
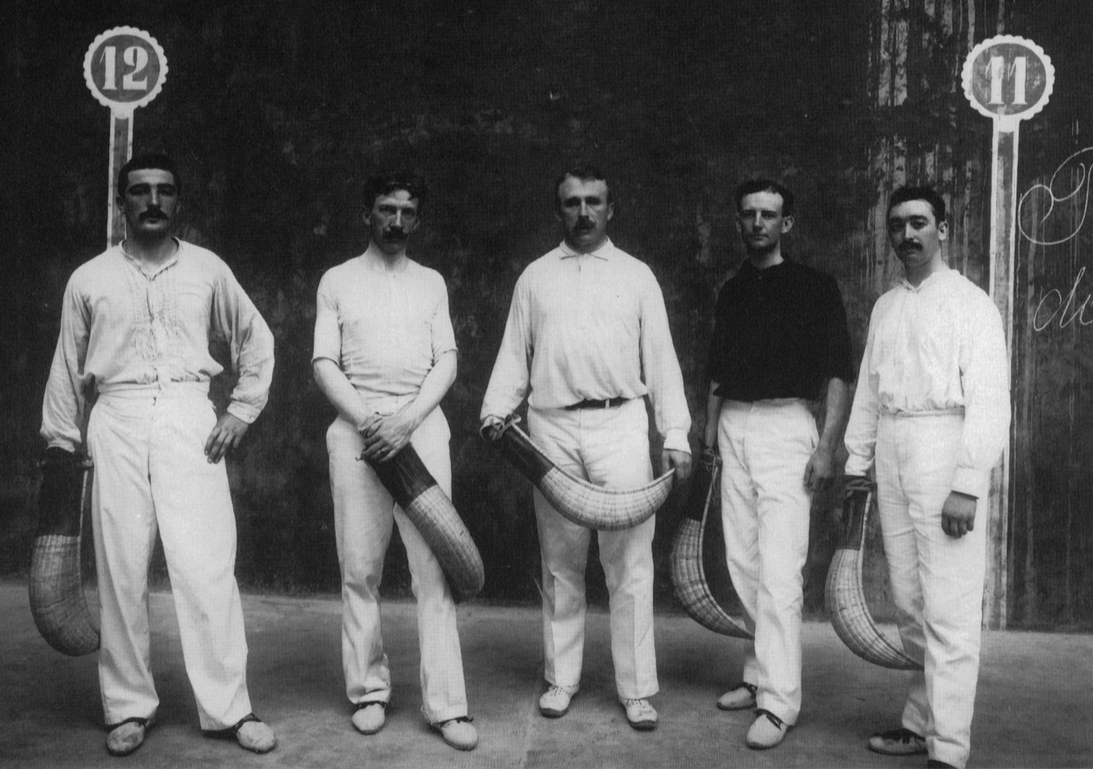
Players at Havana Jai Alai Court circa 1900s

A jai alai game is played in round robin format, usually between eight teams of two players each or eight single players. The first team to score 7 or 9 points wins the game. Two of the eight teams are in the court for each point. The server on one team must bounce the ball behind the serving line, then with the cesta "basket" hurl it towards the front wall so it bounces from there to between lines 4 and 7 on the floor. The ball is then in play. The ball used in jai alai is hand crafted and consists of metal strands tightly wound together and then wrapped in goat skin. Teams alternate catching the ball in their (also hand crafted) cesta and throwing it "in one fluid motion" without holding or juggling it. The ball must be caught either on the fly or after bouncing once on the floor. A team scores a point if an opposing player:

- fails to serve the ball directly to the front wall so that upon rebound it will bounce between lines No. 4 and 7. If it does not, it is an under or over serve and the other team will receive the point.
- fails to catch the ball on the fly or after one bounce
- holds or juggles the ball
- hurls the ball out of bounds
- interferes with a player attempting to catch and hurl the ball

The team scoring a point remains in the court and the opposing team rotates off the court to the end of the list of opponents. Points usually double after the first round of play, once each team has played at least one point. When a game is played with points doubling after the first round, this is called "Spectacular Seven" scoring.

The players frequently attempt a "chula" shot, where the ball is played off the front wall very high, then reaches the bottom of the back wall by the end of its arc. The bounce off the bottom of the back wall can be very low, and the ball is very difficult to return in this situation.

Since there is no wall on the right side, all jai alai players must play right-handed (wear the cesta on their right hand), as the spin of a left-handed hurl would send the ball toward the open right side.

=== Chula shot ===
The players frequently attempt a "chula" shot, where the ball is played off the front wall very high, then reaches the bottom of the back wall by the end of its arc. The bounce off the bottom of the back wall can be very low, and the ball is very difficult to return in this situation.

Since there is no wall on the right side, all jai alai players must play right-handed (wear the Cesta on their right hand), as the spin of a left-handed hurl would send the ball toward the open right side.

== The fastest sport ==
The Basque government promotes jai alai as "the fastest sport in the world" because of the speed of the ball. The sport once held the world record for ball speed with a 125–140 g ball covered with goatskin that traveled at 302 km/h (188 mph), performed by José Ramón Areitio at the Newport, Rhode Island Jai Alai, until it was broken by Canadian 5-time long drive champion Jason Zuback on a 2007 episode of Sport Science with a golf ball speed of 328 km/h (204 mph). The sport can be dangerous, as the ball travels at high velocities. It has led to injuries that caused players to retire and fatalities have been recorded in some cases.

== The building today ==
The original building is 140 ft × 227 ft (43 m × 69 m), five stories of residential concrete construction has been annexed on the Northside (along the exterior of the left wall of the jai alai court) along Calle Virtudes. Carlos Martínez, a music producer and a neighbor who has the keys to the fronton states that: "between 1930 and 1950, this Havana Jai Alai court was perhaps the most important fronton in the world." (Note: In Calles Belascoain and Sitio there was another fronton, smaller and called the Frontón Nuevo or de las Luces, although its name was Havana-Madrid. Another emerged in 1921 whose popular name, brimming with the finest sarcasm, was "La Bombonera" due to the exclusive presence of female players, mostly Basque. It had about 1800 capacities and more than 140 windows.)

== Gallery ==
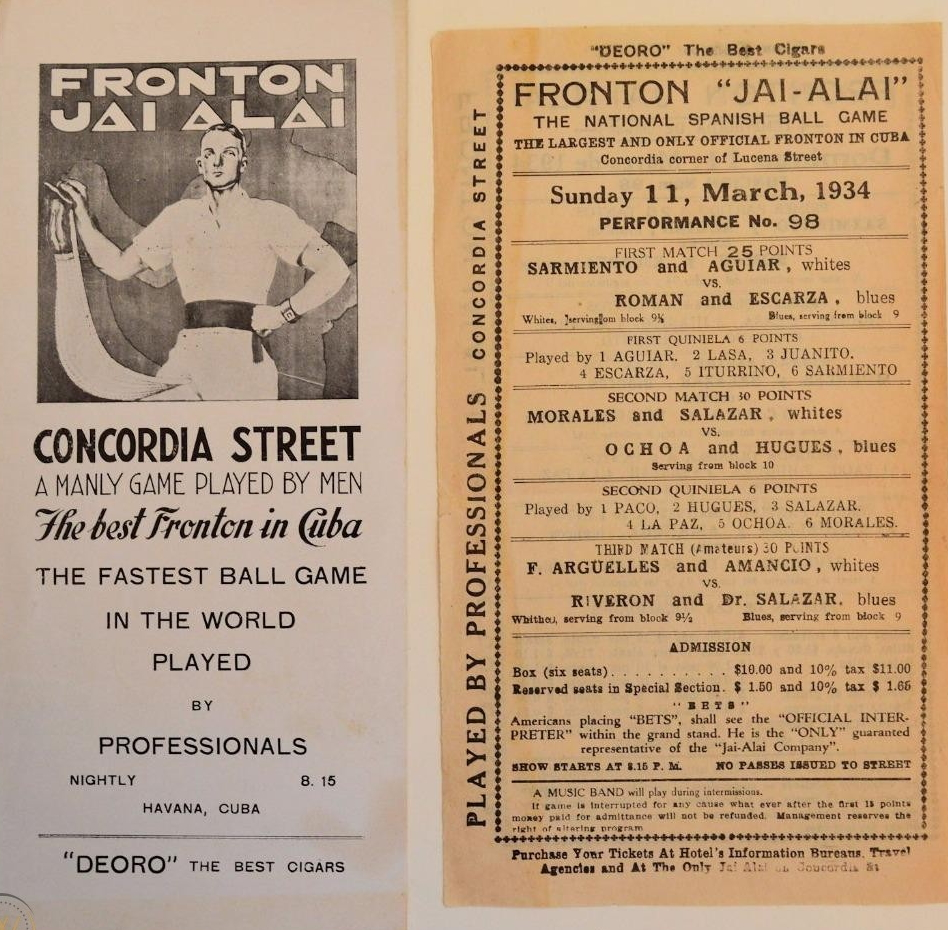
1934-program, "The Largest and Only Official Fronton in Cuba-Concordia corner of Lucena Street."

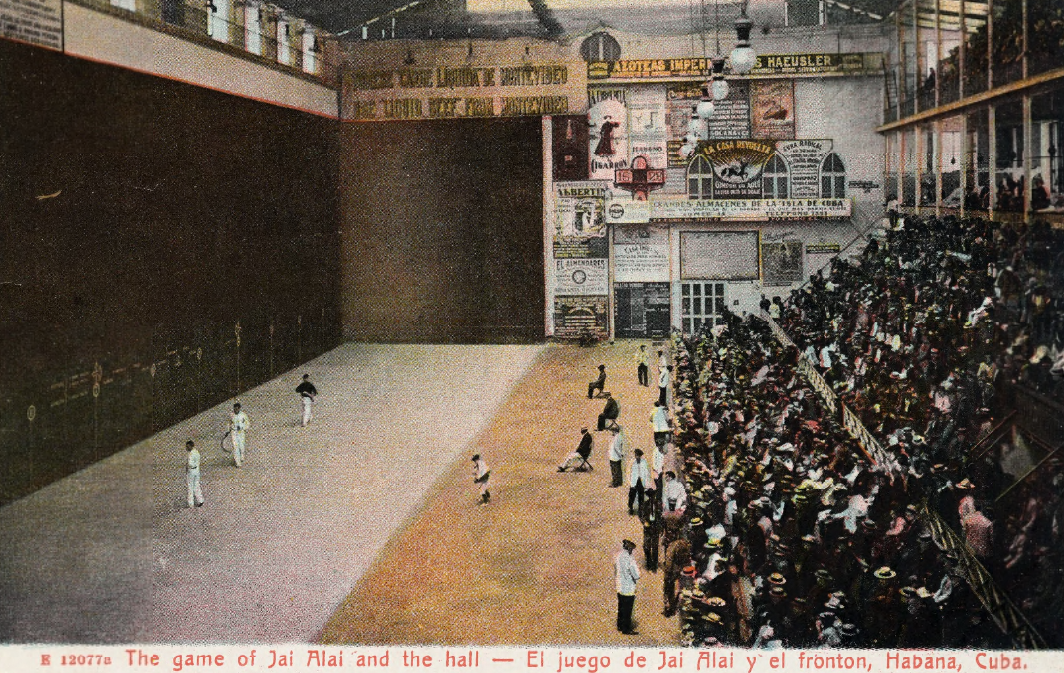
Havana jai alai fronton, Calles Concordia and Lucenas.

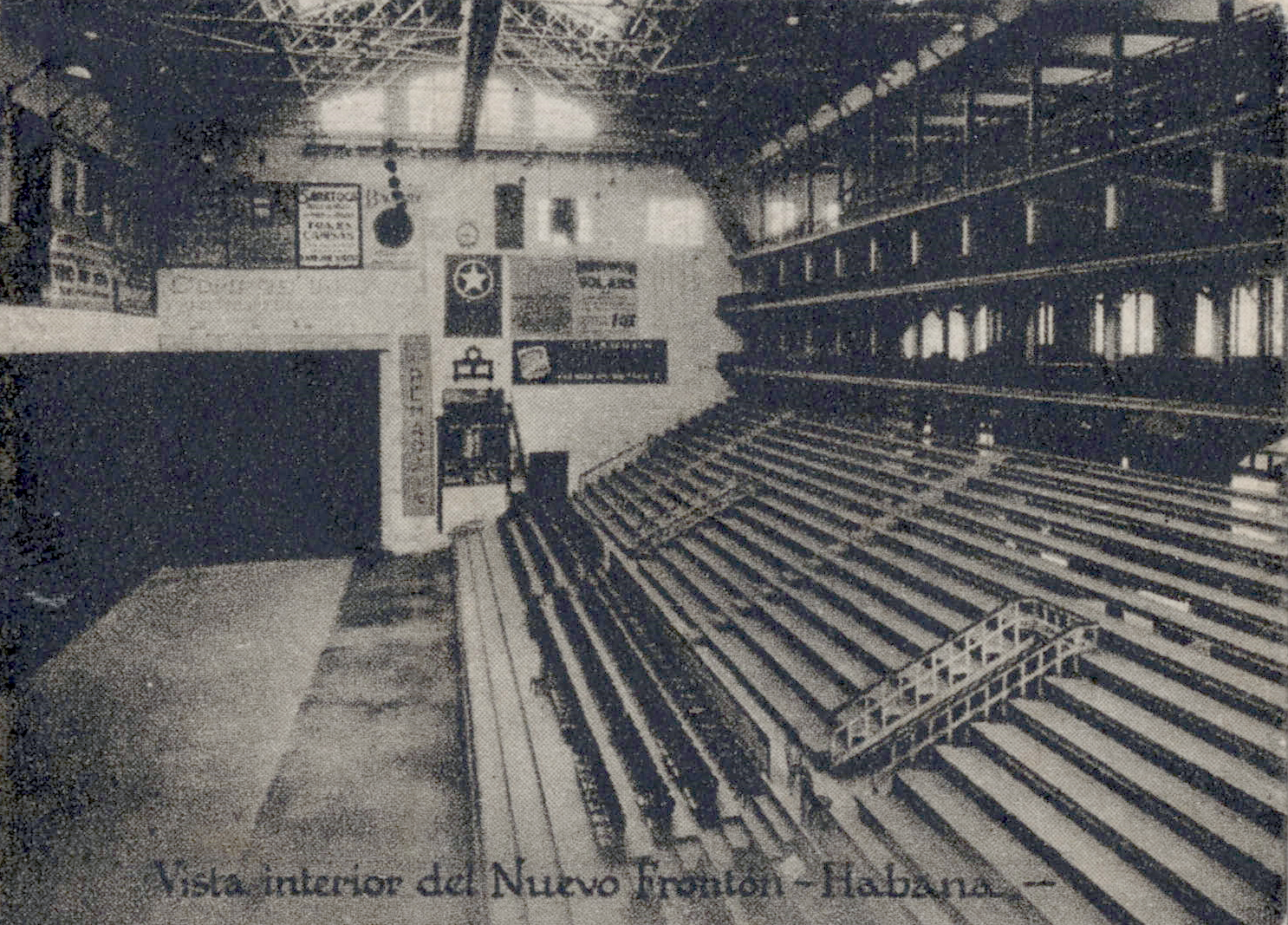
Habana-Madrid, Interior of Havana fronton. Calles Belascoain y Sitios.

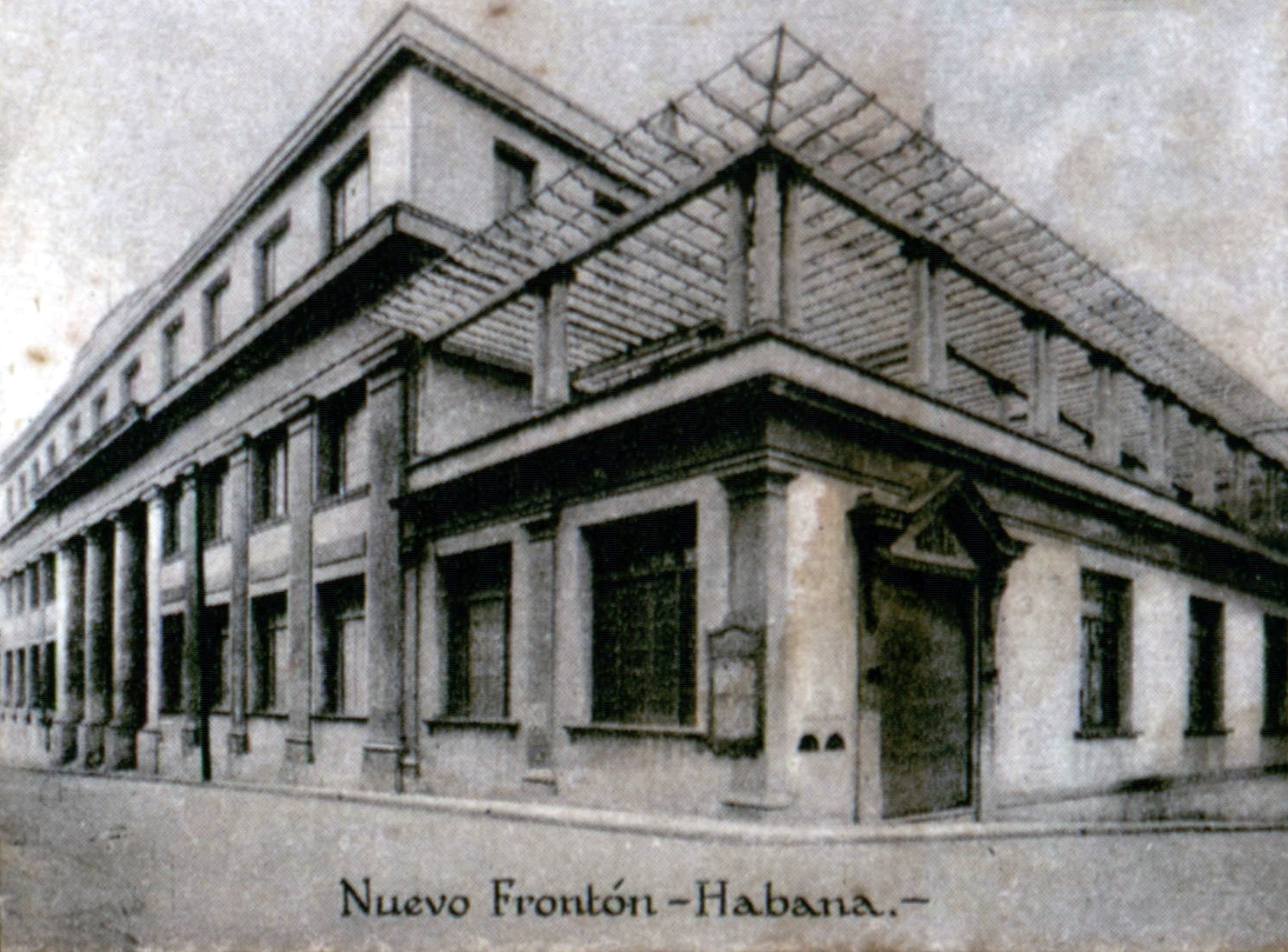
Habana-Madrid, Exterior of Havana fronton. Calles Belascoain y Sitios.

== See also ==
- Barrio de San Lázaro, Havana
- La Casa de Beneficencia y Maternidad de La Habana
- Hospital de San Lázaro, Havana
- Espada Cemetery
- Havana Plan Piloto
- Timeline of Havana
