= Ancell =

Ancell may refer to:

== People with the surname ==
- Bobby Ancell (1911–1987), Scottish football player
- Samuel Ancell (1760–1802), English soldier
- Nathan S. Ancell (1908–1999), American businessman

== Other uses ==
- Ancell, Missouri, a community in the US
- Ancell school of business, Connecticut, US
