= United States India Political Action Committee =

United States political action committee

- Abbreviation: USINPAC
- Formation: September 2002
- Founder: Sanjay Puri
- Founded at: Washington, D.C.
- Type: Non-profit
- Legal status: Active
- Purpose: India-United States relations, advocacy for Indian-Americans
- Region served: United States, India
- Website: usinpac.com

The United States India Political Action Committee is a political action committee based in Washington, D.C. Since its founding in 2002 by businessman Sanjay Puri, USINPAC has described its goal as "working closely with other Indian-American organizations to promote fair and balanced policies, and create a platform to enable the entry of Indian Americans in the political process." Particular issues of note have related to legal immigration, counter-terrorism, business relations, global health, religious freedom, education, and US-India trade. USINPAC has also donated significant funding to the political campaigns of both Democratic and Republican politicians, and past Senate candidates supported by USINPAC include Aruna Miller, Aneesh Chopra, Vivek Kundra, and Kesha Ram among others. USINPAC is involved with the annual US business delegation to India, and has periodically held briefings for members of the United States Congress and the United States House of Representatives. An active proponent of the H-1B Visa Program between 2003 and 2008, USINPAC has also supported the U.S.-India Civil Nuclear Agreement, the Hyde Act, the Section 123 Agreement, the Domestic Prosperity and Global Freedom Act, and hate-crime expansions to the Local Law Enforcement Enhancement Act (LLEEA), among others.

== History ==
=== Background and founding (2000–2003) ===
In September 2002, Indian-American businessman Sanjay Puri and Vikram Chauhan formally established the United States India Political Action Committee (USINPAC), a non-profit political action committee based in Washington, D.C. Surabhi Garg headed fundraising and operations, while Puri became chairman in October 2002. From the start USINPAC described its goal as "working closely with other Indian-American organizations to promote fair and balanced policies, and create a platform to enable the entry of Indian Americans in the political process." Among other issues, starting in 2002 USINPAC began working to educate US lawmakers on a visa backlog in India, which within several years had helped lead to increased staff at the US Embassy in India and funding for a new US Consulate in Hyderabad.

USINPAC also immediately became involved in political campaigns in the US. Financed largely by individual donors, USINPAC donated a total $50,000 to seven American politicians in early 2003 for "their stand on immigration policy, relations with India and policies affecting Indian Americans in a post-September 11 scenario." Five of the seven candidates ended up winning their race. USINPAC soon had liaisons with the India Caucus in US Congress, and on February 13, 2003, USINPAC organized the first India Caucus Day on Capitol Hill, with talks held by politicians such as Joe Crowley, Joe Wilson, Ed Royce, and Jim McDermott. In July 2003, USINPAC organized a Capital Hill reception with the American Jewish Committee and the American Israel Public Affairs Committee, in what the New York Times opined was a "small part of a larger trend of cooperation between Israeli and Indian interests" at large.

=== Pakistan aid and bills (2003–2004) ===
On the issue of aid to Pakistan, USINPAC has from its founding advocated cutting funding to the Pakistani government, instead arguing aid to Pakistan should come "via non-governmental organizations that support political and economic reform with the specific objective of increasing Pakistani economic integration with the international community of nations." According to the Asia Times, USINPAC "put itself on the political map" in May 2003 "when it successfully lobbied for an amendment to the House's US$3 billion aid package for Pakistan." The amendment, which was proposed by Gary Ackerman of the India Caucus in the US Congress, called for "an end to US assistance until Pakistan stopped cross-border attacks in the disputed state of Jammu and Kashmir and gave up weapons of mass destruction." While Ackerman withdrew the amendment after disputes, Asia Times writes "what is important to note is that Ackerman and the USINPAC were not making empty threats: they had the capability to push through the amendment, and the White House knew it." Eni Faleomavaega of the India Caucus in the US Congress instead pushed an alternate but similar amendment through, which among other points "ceased the transfer of weapons of mass destruction, including any associated technologies, to any third country or terrorist organization."

=== Nuclear agreement (2005–2008) ===
"A defining moment for the Indian community in the US was the Indo-US nuclear deal under President George W Bush [which came into effect in 2008]. USINPAC, under the stewardship of Puri, was at the forefront lobbying for it."
—Economic Times (July 5, 2011)

USINPAC set up operations in New Delhi in 2005. From 2005 to 2008 USINPAC advocated for expanded cooperation on defense issues between the US and India. Starting in 2005, for example, USINPAC was closely involved in the passage of the U.S.-India Civil Nuclear Agreement, playing a key role in getting it through Congress three years later. The agreement, first drafted by American and Indian politicians in 2005 and announced by US President George W. Bush in March 2006, would "end a moratorium on sales of nuclear fuel and reactor components to India's civilian nuclear program." Lobbying had "intensified" by June 2006, as USINPAC worked with the Indian American Center for Public Awareness and the Indian American Forum for Political Education to ensure that "the 39 members of the India Caucus in the Senate and more than 180 members of the Caucus in the House of Representatives vote for the deal." USINPAC supported the passage of the related Hyde Act in 2006, and the Section 123 Agreement passed in 2008, allowing US-India cooperation in the civilian nuclear-energy trade. According to The New York Times, the agreement was hailed by officials as "historic" and "a centerpiece of American-Indian relations."

=== Political contributions and media (2005–2013) ===
By June 2006 USINPAC had contributed a total of over $200,000 to Congressional candidates, and had raised campaign money at nine fund-raisers and receptions since January of that year. While USINPAC supports both Democratic and Republican candidates, it has maintained long alliances with politicians such as Hillary Clinton, whose support was considered crucial by some to the success of the US-India 123 Agreement. By 2006 USINPAC had praised Clinton's open stance on outsourcing, stating on their website that "even though she was against outsourcing at the beginning of her political career, she has since changed her position and now maintains that offshoring brings as much economic value to the United States as to the country where services are outsourced, especially India." The Washington Post opined in September 2007 that "in just five years, USINPAC has become the most visible face of Indian American lobbying."

The India Post wrote in 2013 that "USINPAC has been active in promoting nuclear, defense, education, and trade relations between USA and India for the past decade." In relation to US-India trade, USINPAC has provided expert testimony in Congressional hearings on the topic, and also conducted briefings with the Senate Foreign Affairs and House Foreign Affairs Committees. USINPAC was a key proponent in 2013 behind the passage of new measure to expand the FBI's tracking categories of hate crimes. In March 2013, Puri testified before the House Committee on Foreign Relations and advocated prioritizing Indian issues such as education, a STEM Teacher exchange, and the "export of gas to ease India’s energy difficulty." Also that year, USINPAC denounced the arrest of Indian diplomat Devyani Khobragade and the manner it was conducted, calling it a "failure in diplomatic protocol." Accused of making false statements on a visa application, Khobragade had been subjected to a strip search and cavity search by police. In an interview, Puri called for her to be returned to India, and for US officials to treat the arrest with more awareness of public perception in India.

=== Indian elections and recent issues (2014–2015) ===
USINPAC voiced disapproval of the controversial House Resolution 417 in April 2014. Proposed by Indian-Christian activist John Dayal in an attempt to influence the Indian election outcome, the resolution characterized Hinduism in a negative light, with Puri stating "it’s just not the job of the US Congress to tell Indians how to vote in their own election." When asked about USINPAC's own stance on the elections, Puri reassured the press that "we [at USINPAC] have worked diligently to make sure there are no undue influences on the election, and the [chairman] of the House Foreign Relations Committee [Rep. Ed Royce (R-CA)] has assured us that they will stay out of the way." After Narendra Modi was elected Prime Minister of India, USINPAC spearheaded a campaign to schedule a Joint Session of Congress with Modi. In September, Speaker of the House John Boehner invited Modi "to address a Joint Meeting of Congress after mid-term elections, at a time of his choosing," with signed notes of support from 100 bipartisan members of Congress.

USINPAC supported grassroots campaigns behind the Domestic Prosperity and Global Freedom Act and H.R. 2771 (the Expedite Our Economy Act) in 2014, as well as the Senate companion bill S. 2494 (Natural Gas Export Promotion Act). The bills were intended to change current law and enable US exports to India, including shale gas. During a USINPAC-organised legislative briefing, the bills met with support from politicians such as Ted Poe. The Economist referred to USINPAC in May 2015 as "the main political lobby for Indian-Americans in Washington." USINPAC is involved with the annual US business delegation to India to meet with Indian politicians, businesspeople, and newsmakers. In June 2015 USINPAC hosted a delegation led by Jupally Krishna Rao from the newly formed Indian state of Telangana, arranging meetings between American business interests and the delegation "for the purpose of scouting partners and investments." As of November 2015, United States Senate candidates supported by USINPAC included politicians such as Aruna Miller, Ravi Sangisetty, Manan Trivedi, Raja Krishnamoorthi, Aneesh Chopra, Vivek Kundra, Jay Goyal, and Kesha Ram among others.

== Mission and ethos ==
External videos
- "Indian Americans Lobby for U.S. Nuclear Deal" : Sanjay Puri on NPR (June 19, 2006)

As a bipartisan political action committee, USINPAC focuses on diverse issues relevant to the Indian-American community at large. Particular issues of note have related to legal immigration, counter-terrorism, business relations, global health, religious freedom, education, and US-India trade. USINPAC has also donated significant funding to the political campaigns of Democratic and Republican politicians, and in 2009, Puri asserted to the press the USINPAC wanted to ensure that Indian-American candidates "don’t have to think twice about running because they didn't get the financial resources." USINPAC's stance against giving aid directly to the government of Pakistan has at times led to accusations of an anti-Pakistan bias, as have USINPAC's periodic collaborations with organizations such as the American Jewish Committee. USINPAC has assured the press their stance is not the result of a religious or cultural bias, clarifying that the group is "not anti-Pakistan, but in the Kashmir and other sub-continental issues, the group looks after the Indian interests." Among other organizations, USINPAC has worked closely with the American Israel Public Affairs Committee (AIPAC) on issues, often jointly lobbying Congress in support of minority interests.

== Key people ==
The following are key members of the executive committee as of 2015:

- Sanjay Puri - Chairman, Founder
- Surabhi Garg - VP of Finance and Operations
- Robinder Sachdev - Director of India Affairs
- Vikram Chauhan - Director of the Smart Cities Initiative, Founder
- Manish Thakur - Director of US-India Security
- Dr. Rahul Jindal - Director of Healthcare
- Dolly Kapoor - Director of US-States Outreach
- Rahul Srinivasan - Director of the Energy Initiative

== See also ==
- Diaspora politics in the United States
- Hinduism in the United States
- Ethnic interest groups in the United States
- Federation of Tamil Sangams of North America
- India-United States relations
