= Outstanding American by Choice =

Award for naturalized citizens of the United States

Outstanding American by Choice is an award given to naturalized United States citizens "who have achieved [...] extraordinary things" by the US Citizenship and Immigration Services (USCIS) agency of the US Department of Homeland Security (DHS). It was established in January 2006 by Emilio T. Gonzalez, then the director of USCIS. As of 2018, about 130 awards have been given.

== Awardees ==
=== 2006 ===
- Marina Belotserkovsky, Soviet-born; Director of Russian Communications and Community Outreach at the Hebrew Immigrant Aid Society.
- José Luis Betancourt, Mexico-born and raised in Texas; Rear-Admiral of the United States Navy.
- Guarione M. Diaz, Cuban-born; President and Chief Executive Officer of the Cuban American National Council.
- Carlos M. Gutierrez, Cuban-born; U.S. Secretary of Commerce.
- Zalmay Khalilzad, Afghan-born; United States Ambassador to Iraq.
- Renu Khator, Indian-born; Provost and Senior Vice President of Academic Affairs at the University of South Florida.
- Tom Lantos, Hungarian-born; member of the U.S. House of Representatives.
- Guillermo Linares, Dominican-born; Commissioner of the Mayor's Office of Immigrant Affairs for New York City.
- Caitriona Lyons, Irish-born; Refugee Program Coordinator for the State of Texas.
- Jose E. Martinez, Dominican-born; U.S. District Judge for the Southern District of Florida.
- Mel Martínez, Cuban-born; member of the U.S. Senate.
- Gepsie M. Metellus, Haitian-born; Executive Director of the Sant La Haitian Neighborhood Center.
- Clementine M. Msengi, Rwandan-born; Founder and Executive Director of the Bright Move Network.
- Anne M. O'Callaghan, Irish-born; executive director of the Welcoming Center for New Pennsylvanians.
- Eduardo J. Padrón, Cuban-born; President of Miami Dade College.
- Kiran C. Patel, Zambian-born; Chairman of the Patel Foundation for Global Understanding.
- Marion P. Primomo, German-born; Physician, Hospice and Palliative Medicine.
- Ileana Ros-Lehtinen, Cuban-born; member of the U.S. House of Representatives.
- John F. Timoney, Irish-born; Chief of Police of the Miami Police Department.
- Fang A. Wong, Chinese-born; Special Operations Specialist with L3 Communications at ILEX Systems.

=== 2007 ===
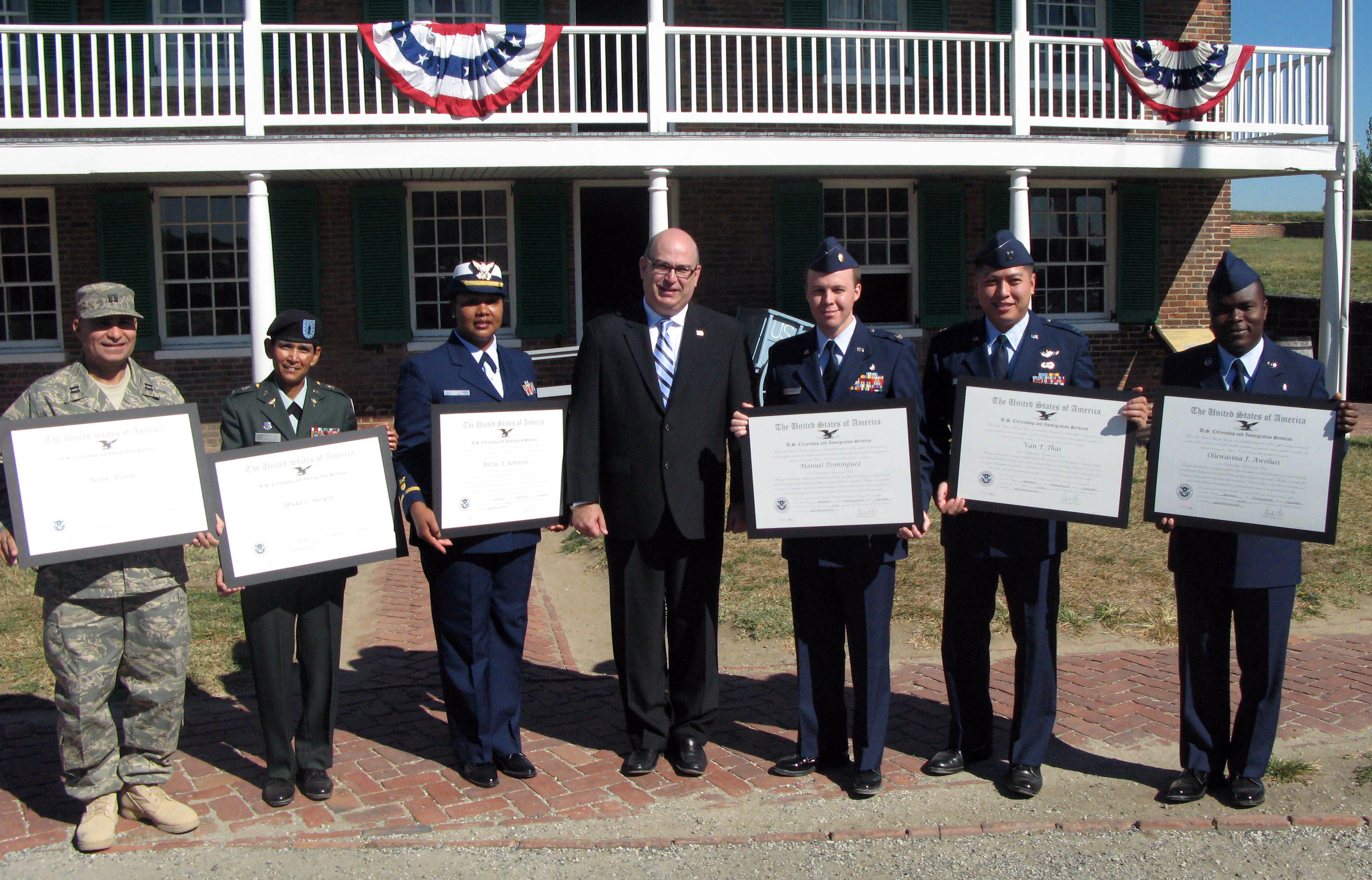
USCIS Director Emilio T. Gonzalez with military recipients on September 24, 2007

- Eduardo Aguirre, Cuban-born; United States Ambassador to the Kingdom of Spain and the Principality of Andorra.
- Rasul Alsalih, Iraqi-born; United States Air Force.
- Oluwasina Awolusi, Nigerian-born; United States Air Force.
- Cristina V. Beato, Cuban-born; Principal Deputy Assistant Secretary for Health at the U.S. Department of Health and Human Services.
- Katja Bullock, German-born; Special Assistant to the President for Presidential Personnel in The White House.
- Josefina Carbonell, Cuban-born; Assistant Secretary for Aging at the U.S. Department of Health and Human Services.
- Franklin Chang Diaz, Costa Rican-born; astronaut.
- Manuel A. Diaz, Cuban-born; Mayor of Miami.
- Manuel Dominguez, Cuban-born; United States Air Force.
- Ricardo Ernst, Venezuelan-born; professor at Georgetown University's McDonough School of Business.
- Emilio Estefan, Cuban-born; musician, producer, entrepreneur.
- Gloria Estefan, Mexican-born; singer-songwriter.
- Luis Glaser, Austrian-born; Professor of Biology and Special Assistant to the President at the University of Miami.
- Vartan Gregorian, Iranian-born; President of the Carnegie Corporation of New York.
- Farooq Kathwari, Indian-born; Chairman and CEO of Ethan Allen.
- M.J. Khan, Pakistani-born; Houston City Council Member.
- Alfonso Martinez-Fonts Jr., Cuban-born; Assistant Secretary of the Private Sector Office at the U.S. Department of Homeland Security.
- Alejandro Gomez Monteverde, Mexican-born; director/screenwriter.
- Indra Nooyi, Indian-born; Chairman and chief executive officer of PepsiCo.
- Tze Ng, Hong Kong-born; entrepreneur.
- Miguel Orozco, Ecuadorian-born; community leader.
- Dina Powell, Egyptian-born; Assistant Secretary of State for Educational and Cultural Affairs at the U.S. Department of State.
- Anna Prager, Polish-born; civic leader.
- Mitzie A. Robinson, Jamaican-born; United States Coast Guard.
- Samuel G. Saldívar, Mexican-born; Professor emeritus at the United States Military Academy.
- John Shalikashvili, Polish-born; General in the United States Army.
- Peter W. Schramm, Hungarian-born; Executive Director of the John M. Ashbrook Center for Public Affairs and Professor of Political Science at Ashland University.
- Abida S. Shoyeb, Pakistani-born; Officer for the South Atlantic District Veterinary Command of the United States Army.
- Antonio Taguba, Filipino-born; Major-General in the United States Army.
- Van T. Thai, Vietnamese-born; United States Air Force.

=== 2008 ===
- Elaine Chao, Taiwanese-born; United States Secretary of Transportation.
- James S. C. Chao, Chinese-born; founder of the Foremost Group.
- Anh Duong, Vietnamese-born; Science Advisor to the Deputy Chief of Naval Operations for Information, Plans and Strategy at the Pentagon.
- John Fugh, Chinese-born; United States Army.
- Andy García, Cuban-born; actor.
- Abul Hussam, Bangladeshi-born; professor at George Mason University.
- Rosario Marin, Mexican-born; Treasurer of the United States.
- Elsa Murano, Cuban-born; President of Texas A&M University.
- Robert Olton, Barbadian-born; United States Army.
- Charles Simic, Serbian-born; Poet Laureate of the United States.
- Albio Sires, Cuban-born; member of the U.S. House of Representatives.
- Ramel Turic, Bosnian-born; United States Army.
- Duncan Wardle, British-born; Vice President Global Public Relations for Disney Parks.
- Elie Wiesel, Romanian-born; writer.
- Donald Zacherl, Canadian-born; United States Army.

=== 2009 ===
- Joseph Cao, Vietnamese-born; member of the U.S. House of Representatives.
- Subir Chowdhury, Bangladeshi-born; author of management books.
- Eartha Dengler, German-born; Founder of the Immigrant City Archives.
- Maria Hinojosa, Mexican-born; journalist and author.
- Peter C. Lemon, Canadian-born; United States Army.
- Eva A. Millona, Albanian-born; Executive Director of the Massachusetts Immigrant and Refugee Advocacy Coalition.
- Virginia M. C. da Mota, Portuguese-born; educator.
- Eskinder Negash, Ethiopian-born; Director of the Office of Refugee Resettlement at the U.S. Department of Health and Human Services.

=== 2010 ===
- Patrick Corvington, Haitian-born; CEO of the Corporation for National and Community Service.
- Kawther Elmi, Ethiopian-born; Park Ranger for the National Park Service.
- Oscar Bautista Hilman, Filipino-born; United States Army.
- Ledum Ndaanee, Nigerian-born; U.S. Marine Corps.
- Stephan Ross, Polish-born; Founder of the New England Holocaust Memorial.
- Tibor Rubin, Hungarian-born; United States Army.
- Rangita de Silva de Alwis, born in Sri Lanka; Director of the International Human Rights Policy at Wellesley College.
- Samuel So, born in Hong Kong; professor at Stanford University.

=== 2011 ===
- Madeleine K. Albright, Czech-born; former U.S. Secretary of State.
- Joseph A. Banco, Jr., Yugoslavian-born; Associate Chief of U.S. Border Patrol at the U.S. Customs and Border Protection.
- Omar Cruz, Dominican-born; Federal Emergency Management Agency.
- Arturo E. Howard, Colombian-born; U.S. Coast Guard.
- Betty Nguyen Phillips, Vietnamese-born; U.S. Secret Service.
- Alma Plancich, Croatian-born; Executive Director of the Ethnic Heritage Council.
- Nawar Shora, Syrian-born; Transportation Security Administration.
- Gerda Weissmann Klein, Polish-born; Founder of Citizenship Counts.
- Aster Zeleke, Ethiopian-born; U.S. Citizenship and Immigration Services.

=== 2012 ===
- Christopher Che; President and CEO of the Che International Group.
- Anni Chung, Hong Kong-born; President and Chief Executive Officer at Self Help for the Elderly.
- Ping Fu, Chinese-born; President and CEO of Geomagic.
- Khaled Hosseini, Afghan-born; diplomat.
- Michael Moritz, British-born; Partner at Sequoia Capital.
- Maria Otero, Bolivian-born; Under Secretary Civilian Security, Democracy, and Human Rights.
- Shervin Pishevar Iranian-born; Managing Director of Menlo Ventures.
- Jan Vilček, Czech-born; academic.
- Vivek Wadhwa, Indian-born; Academic, researcher, writer and entrepreneur.

=== 2013 ===
- Ferozan Alamshahi Akbari, Afghan-born; U.S. Citizenship and Immigration Services.
- Pearl B. Chang, Chinese-born; U.S. Citizenship and Immigration Services.
- John A. Herrera, Cuban-born; Senior Vice President for Latino Hispanic Affairs at the Self-Help Services Corporation.
- Rahul M. Jindal, Indian-born; surgeon.
- Olga B. Koper, Polish-born; Market Manager for the Battelle Memorial Institute.
- Ramon Melocarela, Dominican-born; U.S. Citizenship and Immigration Services.
- Anna Mongayt, Russian-born; Co-founder and Head of Operations at Upstart.
- Alfredo Quiñones-Hinojosa, Mexican-born; neurosurgeon.
- Amarpreet S. Sawhney, Indian-born; President and CEO of Ocular Therapeutix.
- Sivalingam Sivananthan, Sri Lankan-born; academic.
- Tsehaye Teferra, Ethiopian-born; Founder and President of the Ethiopian Community Development Council.

=== 2014 ===
- José Andrés, Spanish-born; chef.
- John Lukacs, Hungarian-born; historian.
- Alejandro Mayorkas, Cuban-born; Deputy Secretary of the U.S. Department of Homeland Security.

=== 2015 ===
- Maria Contreras-Sweet, Mexican-born; Administrator of the U.S. Small Business Administration.
- Mercy A. Diez, United States Army.
- Daniel Finn, Irish-born; Catholic priest.
- Larry La, Vietnamese-born; Principal of the Meiwah Restaurant Group.
- Mariano Rivera, Panamian-born; former baseball pitcher for the New York Yankees.
- Thalía, Mexican-born; singer-songwriter, actress.
- Alberto Vasallo, Jr., Cuban-born; Founder of El Mundo newspaper.

=== 2016 ===
- Julian Chun-Chung Chow, Taiwanese-born; professor at the University of California, Berkeley.
- Hesung Chun Koh, South Korean-born; former chair and president of the East Rock Institute.
- Florent Groberg, French-born; United States Army.
- Antonia Hernández, Mexican-born; President and CEO of the California Community Foundation.
- Uri D. Herscher, Israeli-born; President and CEO of the Skirball Cultural Center.
- Sally Jewell, British-born; former U.S. Secretary of the Interior.
- Samantha Power, Irish-born; diplomat.
- Johan E. Uvin, Belgian-born; U.S. Department of Education.

=== 2017 ===
- Marisol A. Chalas, U.S. Army Reserve.
- Meb Keflezighi, Eritrean-born; long-distance runner.
