= List of business schools in Connecticut =

This is a list of business schools in Connecticut, arranged in alphabetical order.

School	Founded	Parent University	City	AACSB Accreditation
Ancell School of Business		Western Connecticut State University	Danbury	No
Barney School of Business		University of Hartford	Hartford	Yes
Charles F. Dolan School of Business	1947	Fairfield University	Fairfield	Yes
School of Business		Central Connecticut State University	New Britain	Yes
School of Business	1916	Quinnipiac University	Hamden	Yes
School of Business	1941	University of Connecticut	Storrs	Yes
Yale School of Management	1976	Yale University	New Haven	Yes
