= Gottschlich =

Gottschlich may refer to:

- Gudrun Gottschlich (born 1970), German footballer
- Hugo Gottschlich (1905–1984), Austrian actor
- Stefanie Gottschlich (born 1978), German footballer
- Markus Gottschlich, Austrian jazz pianist and composer
- Ronny Gottschlich (born 1975), German businessman
