= Sweet Tree =

Sweet Tree Holdings is a Vermont, United States, company that produces maple products from a sugarbush and processing facility in Island Pond.

The company was founded in 2013, and the following year spent $700,000 to purchase a vacant building, formerly a furniture factory for Ethan Allen, in Island Pond. Ahead of the 2015 sugaring season, the company purchased 7,000 acres of forest near Island Pond, at a cost of $5.5 million, and installed over 90,000 taps. During the company's first year producing syrup, it produced 35,000 gallons of syrup, which was stored on site while it worked to find and develop a market.

By the 2016 season, Sweet Tree had installed 200,000 taps on 24,000 acres of land, though it continued to store its syrup. It introduced a trademarked brand, Maple Guild, under which it planned to sell, in addition to pure syrup, value-added maple products such as waters, teas, and flavored syrups. At full build-out, Sweet Tree plans to be the largest maple producer in the United States, with around 500,000 taps.
