= Marisol Chalas =

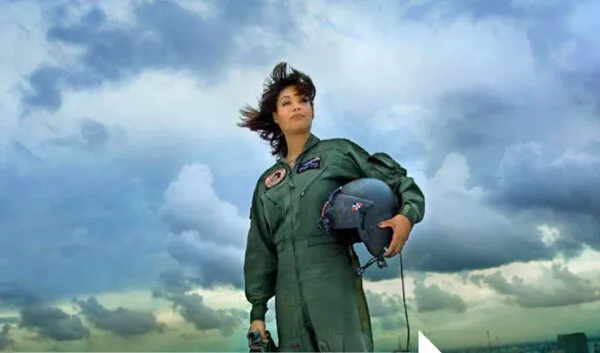
Marisol Chalas

Marisol A. Chalas is a Colonel in the United States Army Reserve and the first Latina female National Guard Black Hawk helicopter pilot. Chalas is also the first woman of Dominican heritage to achieve the rank of Colonel in the Army Reserve.

== Life ==
Born in Bani, Dominican Republic, at the age of nine, Chalas moved to Massachusetts. She graduated from Massachusetts Maritime Academy. She started her military career as an enlisted soldier in the United States Army in July 1990. She graduated from the U.S. Army Aviation Center of Excellence and in 2001, received her commission as a 2nd Lieutenant in the aviation branch from the Georgia Military Institute Officer Candidate School.

Chalas has served in various leadership positions, from Battle Captain and Platoon Leader during Operation Iraqi Freedom, Aviation Liaison Officer for the Combined Joint Task Force, New Horizons Humanitarian Assistance project in Barahona, Dominican Republic, and U.S. Army Reserve Exchange Officer with the Canadian Forces in Kingston, Ontario, Canada. In 2017, she was congressional fellow. In 2024, she was Parks Reserve Forces Training Area Garrison Commander.

Chalas serves on several Advisory Councils and Boards including The Joseph A Unanue Latino Institute of Seton Hall University, The Cristian Rivera Foundation and more.

Chalas has been awarded with various decorations, including the Meritorious Service Medal (3 Bronze Oak Leaf Clusters), Army Air Medal, Army Commendation Medal (Bronze Oak Leaf Cluster), Army Achievement Medal (3 Bronze Oak Leaf Clusters) Army Reserve Components Achievement Medal (4 Bronze Oak Leaf Clusters), National Defense Service Medal (Bronze Service Star), and the Global War on Terrorism Expeditionary Medal.

Chalas has also been awarded the Maritime Person of the Year by the Massachusetts Maritime Academy in 2016 and the United States Citizenship and Immigration Services Outstanding American by Choice award in 2017. In 2021, she was awarded the Medal of Merit by the Dominican President Luis Abinader and declared as a Distinguished Citizen by the Dominican Senate and Chamber of Deputies.
