= ASB =

ASB or asb may refer to:

== Education ==
- Aarhus School of Business, a Danish business school
- Ancell School of Business, a business school at Western Connecticut State University, United States
- The Alabama School for the Blind, a part of the Alabama Institute for Deaf and Blind
- American School of Barcelona, Spain, a private tri-lingual school (pre-K to Grade 12)
- Asia School of Business, Malaysia, a business school cofounded by Bank Negara Malaysia and MIT Sloan School of Management
- Associated Student Body, a type of student organization
- Australian School of Business, a business school at the University of New South Wales, Australia

== Business ==
- Accounting Standards Board, responsible for issuing accounting standards in the United Kingdom
- ASB Bank, one of the largest banks in New Zealand
- Auditing Standards Board, a technical committee related to accounting in the United States
- American Savings Bank, Hawaii's third-largest financial institution

== Writing ==
- A. S. Byatt, an English critic, novelist, poet and short story writer (born 1936)
- Archives of Sexual Behavior, a sexology journal
- Alternative Service Book, a prayer book of the Church of England

== Other uses ==
- Artificially sweetened beverage, a beverage containing non-nutritive sweeteners
- Anti-social behaviour, a set of actions that harm or lack consideration for the well-being of others
  - Anti-social Behaviour Act 2003, an act of the Parliament of the United Kingdom
- Asymbescaline, a psychedelic drug related to mescaline
- American Saddlebred, an American horse breed
- Apostilb, a unit of luminance
- Alt.sex.bondage, a Usenet newsgroup
- Alien space bats, a term used while discussing implausible points of divergence in alternate history
- Asociación de Scouts de Bolivia, the national Scouting association of Bolivia
- Advanced stop box, an area at an intersection reserved for certain types of vehicles
- Arbeiter-Samariter-Bund Deutschland, a German humanitarian charity
- Assiniboine language (ISO 639-3 code: asb)
- Ashgabat Airport (IATA code: ASB)
- Advertising Standards Bureau, the former name of Ad Standards, Australian advertising regulator
