= Cheryl Tatano Beck =

American obstetric nurse

Academic background
- Education: BSc, Western Connecticut State University; DNSc, Boston University; MSN, maternal newborn nursing, CNM, 1972, Yale University

Cheryl Tatano Beck is an American obstetric nurse. She is a Distinguished Professor at the University of Connecticut where she focuses on postpartum mood and anxiety disorders.

== Early life and education ==
Tatano Beck grew up in Stamford, Connecticut. While enrolled at Western Connecticut State University, she maintained a GPA of 3.5 in her freshman year and received the 1970 Jane C. Thompson Nursing award. After completing her Bachelor of Science degree, Tatano Beck earned her DNSc from Boston University and her MSN in maternal newborn nursing and CNM from Yale University.

== Career ==
Following placements at Simmons College, the University of Michigan, Salve Regina University, Florida Atlantic University, and the University of Rhode Island, Tatano Beck returned to Yale as a Clinical Professor in their Department of Nursing. In this role, she developed a checklist to identify women at risk for developing postpartum depression. She also held a joint appointment at the University of Connecticut's School of Nursing. In 2001, Tatano Beck's Postpartum Depression Screening Scale (PDSS) to identify women at risk for developing postpartum depression became available to clinicians nationwide. The aim of the survey was to allow clinicians to quickly determine whether their patients are suffering from postpartum stress. Beyond the PDSS, Tatano Beck also conducted trials on the role of diet in curing postpartum depression. She led tests on the effect of a diet enriched in Docosahexaenoic acid (DHA) during pregnancy on postpartum depression and the role of dietary DHA in mood regulation in new mothers. In 2009, Tatano Beck received the Association of Women's Health, Obstetric, and Neonatal Nurses’ Distinguished Professional Service Award.

During the COVID-19 pandemic, Tatano Beck investigated the impact of COVID-19 on women giving birth and the beginning of the postpartum period through the gathering of both quantitative and qualitative data. She also co-authored a paper studying the experience of nurses during the pandemic. Later, Tatano Beck became the fifth American and second nurse researcher to receive the Marcé Medal for Perinatal Mental Health Research.
