= Evan Bernstein =

Evan Bernstein may refer to:

- Evan Bernstein (wrestler) (born 1960), Olympic wrestler for Israel
- Evan R. Bernstein (born 1974), American public figure and community leader
