= H.R. 6 =

H.R. 6 may refer to:

- American Dream and Promise Act, a bill introduced in the 116th and 117th Congress
- 21st Century Cures Act, a bill enacted by the 114th United States Congress
- Domestic Prosperity and Global Freedom Act, a bill introduced during the 113th United States Congress
