= David Byerman =

American politician

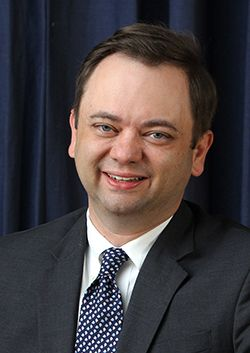

Chief Executive Officer, Chester County, Pennsylvania
- Incumbent
- Assumed office December 9, 2024

Personal details
- Born: David Byerman
- Party: Non-Partisan
- Spouse: Caroline Byerman
- Children: Amanda; Will
- Education: University of Pennsylvania; University of Redlands
- Website: Chester County

David Byerman (born September 23, 1971) is an American government official who previously served as chief executive officer of Chester County, Pennsylvania. He was Secretary of the Senate for the Nevada Senate (2010–2015) and director of the Kentucky Legislative Research Commission (2015–2018).

== Biography ==
Byerman is a graduate of McQueen High School in Reno, Nevada. He received his Bachelor of Arts degree, magna cum laude, from the University of Redlands, with a double major in history and political science, and president of the student body. Byerman earned a Master of Governmental Administration degree from the Fels Institute of Government at the University of Pennsylvania.

He is married to Caroline Byerman. They have two children, Amanda and Will.

== Early career ==
Byerman began his career as executive director of Greater Philadelphia Clean Cities, Inc., a public-private partnership that promotes alternative fuel vehicles. Under Byerman's leadership, Greater Philadelphia Clean Cities developed from a start-up non profit to become the winner of the "Governor's Award for Environmental Excellence," an honor awarded by Governor Tom Ridge in 1998.

Byerman moved back to his home state of Nevada in 1998 and was on the staff of Governor Bob Miller. There, Byerman was executive assistant to the governor, a policy position in which Byerman managed transportation, environmental, and information technology issues as a member of the governor's senior staff. From the governor's staff, Byerman went on to lead intergovernmental relations for the Nevada Department of Transportation.

As a volunteer in his community, Byerman has been president of the Sparks Chamber of Commerce, chairman of the State of Nevada's Advisory Committee on Participatory Democracy, and chairman of the board of the Nevada Association of Nonprofit Organizations.

== Census 2000 and Census 2010 ==
Byerman was chief government liaison for Nevada for the U.S. Census Bureau during both the 2000 and 2010 Census campaigns. In this role, Byerman was the lead strategist and media spokesman for both campaigns. Nevada's 2000 Census Campaign produced the biggest turnaround of any state in the nation; while 2.3% of Nevadans were missed in 1990, the undercount was cut to only 1.6% in 2000. The improved Census count was calculated to have produced $16 million for Nevada annually in additional federal allocations from 2000 to 2010. Both campaigns were successful, and Byerman was credited with having played a major role as both an advocate and an organizer.

== Secretary of the Senate ==
David Byerman was the 40th secretary of the Senate for the Nevada Senate. He was appointed by then-Senate Majority Leader Steven Horsford on August 18, 2010 and was then unanimously elected by the full Nevada Senate on February 7, 2011 and on February 4, 2013.

Byerman was the first Southern Nevada resident appointed as Secretary of the Senate. The position is full-time and non-partisan. As Secretary of the Senate, Byerman served as the chief executive officer and Parliamentarian for the Nevada State Senate. The Secretary of the Senate oversees a session staff that grows to over 100 during legislative sessions, and includes legislative staff, floor staff, sergeants at arms, research assistants, and others.

Secretary Byerman implemented a wide variety of initiatives to increase accessibility and transparency in government during his terms of office. Channel 21 is a communications channel for the Senate and includes Senate news and information, explanations about jargon and legislative terminology, live video of Senate committee and floor sessions, national and local news, and meeting information. SENarts was a partnership among the Nevada Senate, Nevada Division of Museums and Nevada Arts Council that included arts competitions, programs, and a campaign to build the Senate's permanent art collection. uLegislate was a simulation in the Senate Chambers that offered visitors the chance to play the roles of Senators and Senate officers on the floor of the Senate.

After a change in party control in the Senate for the 2015 Legislative Session, the new Republican leadership announced that former secretary Claire J. Clift would be re-appointed to the job.

== Director of the Legislative Research Commission ==
Byerman assumed office on October 1, 2015, taking the helm of an agency that had been racked by a sexual harassment scandal and poor management practices. Citing a highly professional workforce, Byerman expressed early optimism in a full recovery for the agency. He wrote an op-ed less than a week into his tenure, which was widely run in every major newspaper in the state, in which he was widely quoted saying that LRC needed to "get its swagger back." Byerman assumed office on October 1, 2015.

After over a year in office, Byerman was credited by Senate President Robert Stivers with making progress in addressing policy issues at LRC. In his first two months with the agency, over 125 employees scheduled one-on-one meetings with the director. He has moved to shore up internal LRC communications, establishing a daily internal news bulletin, launching a bimonthly newsletter, and establishing a social media presence under the handle @DirectorLRC. He also changed a longtime policy where employees were awarded a set number of comp time hours at the sole discretion of the Director, opting instead to adopt a "one for one" comp time approach.

In August 2016, Byerman presented, and the Legislative Research Commission approved, an employee classification plan. This established—for the first time in the agency's history—formal job descriptions for all positions and a formal organizational structure. For years, LRC employees operated without clearly explained procedures for advancement or pay increases, with the staff feeling that many decisions were being made arbitrarily by previous directors. Then House Speaker Greg Stumbo gave Byerman's plan high marks, saying it was a good plan that addressed longstanding issues documented by the National Conference of State Legislatures. Byerman planned to implement performance evaluations based on the classification plan.

In 2017, the LRC announced that it had updated its measurement of employee satisfaction, using an identical survey to one used to diagnose widespread employee dissatisfaction previously. The updated survey dramatic improvement for the agency under Byerman's leadership, with LRC showing improvements in 49 of the 54 areas in which employee satisfaction was measured. The area that showed the biggest change between 2014 and 2017 reflected increased confidence that LRC's hiring practices are consistent for all job openings. On a four-point scale, employee responses on that topic were almost nine-tenths of a point higher in this year's survey. Overall, employee satisfaction with Byerman's performance as Director was measured at 73%. Shortly after the survey results were released, Byerman received a contract extension from the Legislative Research Commission.

In August, 2018, legislative leadership informed Director Byerman that his contract would not be renewed for a fourth year. The move was widely believed to have been made for political reasons, causing an outcry from editorial pages and constituent groups. Upon news breaking of his pending departure, Byerman was hailed by constituents and some legislative leaders for his efforts at transparency, citizen engagement, and youth empowerment. In a statement, House Minority Leader Rocky Adkins hailed Byerman for bringing “a deep level of experience and expertise. Legislators and legislative staff alike owe him a great deal for his many contributions.” The role of LRC Director, up until the end of Director Byerman's term a strictly nonpartisan role, has since been filled by staffers with long ties to Republican leadership, who had previously held partisan roles.

== CEO of Chester County, Pennsylvania ==
In November 2024, the Chester County Commissioners announced that Byerman would be the county's first Chief Executive Officer. The move marked a return to a county where Byerman lived in the 1990s. In this role, Board of Commissioners Chair Josh Maxwell indicated that Byerman would be responsible for the overall leadership of the county's 2,600 employees and for shaping the county's strategic vision. He is responsible for a budget of over $730 million and a workforce of more than 2,600 employees.

During his tenure, Byerman has spearheaded significant organizational changes, including the creation of a first-in-the-nation "Chief Experience Officer" position to emphasize the importance of constituent experience. Announcing the new role in the context of working within the county's existing budget, he pledged to lead "with discipline, integrity, and a steadfast commitment to responsible stewardship of public funds."

Byerman also managed a comprehensive redesign of the county's official website, modernizing its layout and functionality to improve mobile access and encourage greater civic participation, continuing his longstanding focus on participatory democracy.

Responding to federal funding shortfalls, Byerman worked with elected leadership to facilitate the acceleration of county support for essential services, including increased funding for the Chester County Food Bank, and, with Board of Commissioners Chair Josh Maxwell, pledged a "full court press" to defend local funding priorities.

In September 2025, Byerman participated in a live panel discussion on immigration sponsored by WHYY and The Welcoming Center, where he described his creation of an Immigration Working Group (IWG) for the County. The IWG brings together county departments under his supervision — including prison, emergency services, and health — with nonprofit leaders, mushroom farmers, and human rights advocates. Its mission includes three core goals: "One is to share information and dispel disinformation... Two is to identify new channels of communication, so we’re ready for major news developments when they happen, and we have those connections already. And three is to identify issues that need to be elevated to the county commissioners, to our state legislative delegation and to our federal delegation."

On March 2, 2026, David Byerman abruptly moved on from his employment with the County of Chester. Although the County of Chester stated they that the work over the 14 months of his tenure was appreciated and they wished him well in his future endeavors, they were also pleased to announce his successor, Erik Walschburger and the return of the title "County Administrator" with Walschburger's appointment.

== Awards and recognition ==
In May 2013, Byerman was honored with the Jean Ford Democracy Award by Secretary of State Ross Miller in recognition of his dedication to engaging the public in the democratic process.

In April 2014 Byerman was announced by the Clark County Law Foundation as a winner of the Liberty Bell Award. According to the citation, the Liberty Bell Award, "recognizes individuals in the community who uphold the rule of law, contribute to good government within the community, stimulate a sense of civic responsibility, and encourage respect for the law in the courts."

At its Legislative Summit, the National Conference of State Legislatures announced in August 2014 that Byerman was the recipient of the Kevin B. Harrington Award. The award, named for Senator Kevin B. Harrington, "recognizes an individual or organization for advancing public understanding of state and local representative democracy."

In 2025, Byerman graduated from the Center for Excellence in County Leadership program.
