= Nathan S. Ancell =

Nathan Ancell
- Born: Nathan Ancelewitz; August 22, 1908; New York City, U.S.
- Died: May 31, 1999 (aged 90)
- Education: Columbia University (BA)
- Occupations: Businessman; philanthropist
- Known for: Co-founder of Ethan Allen; Namesake of the Ancell School of Business

Nathan S. Ancell (August 22, 1908 – May 31, 1999) co-founded the Ethan Allen furniture company with his brother-in-law, Theodore Baumritter, in 1932. Together, the two men pioneered the concept of selling furniture in room-style settings and built the Ethan Allen company. Today, Ethan Allen has sales of nearly $1 billion.

== Early life ==
Born Nathan Ancelewitz, Nathan S. "Nat" Ancell grew up in New York and was Jewish. In 1932, he and his brother-in-law started a small housewares company. The two bought a bankrupt furniture manufacturer in Beecher Falls, Vermont a few years later. Ancell attended Columbia College in New York City, New York and graduated in 1929.

== Business practices ==
Ancell was known as the father of the gallery concept, where furniture was placed in real-life settings in furniture stores. The company vision statement illustrates his viewpoint in how to conduct business: "To promote dreams not just furniture-to help consumers have the attractive homes they want, regardless of the station in life."

The family sold the Ethan Allen company to Interco in 1980. Ancell continued as manager and later as an advisor until the company was sold again in 1989.

== Philanthropic works ==
In 1982, he was honored by Western Connecticut State University, who named the Ancell School of Business after him following his donation of $900,000. Afterwards, he taught ethics and marketing at the school.

Ancell served on the board of Brandeis University for 25 years. He funded a chair in physics and a fellowship in physics, and was awarded an honorary Doctorate in 1990 and the Distinguished Community Service Award in 1988.

He established the Florence and Theodore Baumritter Chair in Medicine at the Albert Einstein College of Medicine of Yeshiva University. He was also a benefactor and received an honorary degree.

Ancell also served as co-chair of the UJA-Federation Board of Directors.
