= Rangita de Silva de Alwis =

Sri Lankan-American human rights activist and scholar

- Citizenship: Sri Lanka, United States
- Education: University of Colombo (LLB), Harvard Law School (LLM, SJD)
- Occupations: Researcher, scholar, academic

Rangita de Silva de Alwis is a Sri Lankan-American academic, lawyer and women's rights expert. She is well known as a strong advocate demanding equal and fair representation of women in all spheres. She has worked in over 25 countries as a human rights scholar with different governmental organizations, non-governmental organizations, and academic institutions.

== Career ==
de Silva de Alwis obtained her Bachelor of Law degree from University of Colombo. She received her LL.M in 1994 and S.J.D. in 1997 from Harvard Law School. In 2010, she was conferred with the prestigious Outstanding American by Choice award from the US Citizenship and Immigration Services (USCIS) agency of the US Department of Homeland Security.

She currently serves as Senior Adjunct Professor of Global Leadership University of Pennsylvania Carey Law School, where she also served as the Academic Director of the Global Institute for Human Rights.

She is also Hillary Rodham Clinton Fellow on Gender Equity at the Georgetown Institute for Women, Peace and Security (GIWPS). She notably served as the inaugural director of the Global Women's Leadership Initiative and Women in Public Service Project under the auspices of Secretary Hillary Clinton at the Woodrow Wilson International Center. She initiated the Global Women's Leadership Initiative in 2017 under the auspices of UN Women's Executive Director, Under Secretary-General Phumzile Mlambo-Ngcuka in order to map the laws that regulate the status of women in the family. In 2017, she was also appointed as a Global Advisor to the UN Sustainable Development Goal Fund.

She has also served as Distinguished Advisor to the executive director of UN Women on campaigning for global women's rights and women's leadership. She has also served in various other capacities as a Leader-in-Residence at the Harvard Kennedy School's Women and Public Policy Program between 2019 and 2021, Senior Fellow at Harvard Law School's Center on the Legal Profession, and Expert to the Access to Justice and Technology Task Force of the World Bank. She has also worked as a research expert collaborating with Chinese gender and law experts and has also testified twice before the Congressional Executive Commission on China regarding the status of women's rights in China. She has also convened several transnational networks including the Women's Leadership Network in Muslim Communities, the Asia Cause Lawyer Network in India, and the Gender and Law Expert Group with women academics in China. She also served as Director of the International Human Rights Policy at Wellesley Centers for Women.

=== UN CEDAW Committee ===
de Silva de Alwis was nominated by Sri Lanka as an independent expert for membership to the United Nations Committee on the Elimination of Discrimination Against Women, and she was elected to the committee during the 22nd Meeting of the State Parties to the CEDAW Convention for the term 2023 to 2026.
