= Evan R. Bernstein =

American nonprofit executive

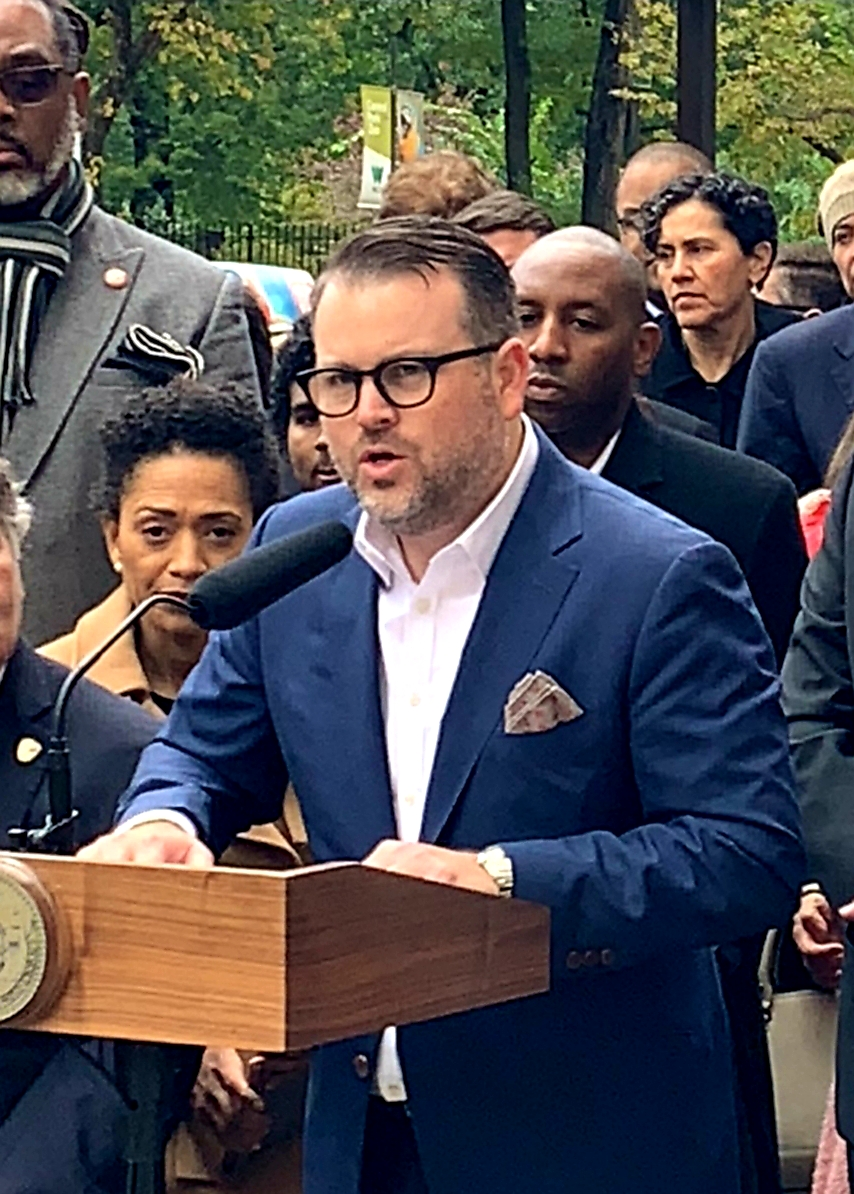
- Bernstein speaking in 2018
- Born: October 6, 1974 (age 52); United States
- Education: Western Connecticut State University (BA); Harvard University (ALM); University of Tennessee, Knoxville
- Occupation: Nonprofit executive
- Known for: Jewish and Community activism

Evan R. Bernstein (born October 6, 1974) is an American public figure and community leader, known for his work with Jewish NGOs.

He assumed the role of CEO of B’nai B’rith International on August 24, 2026.

He worked for the Anti-Defamation League (ADL) starting in 2013 and became the inaugural CEO and National Director of Community Security Service (CSS) in May 2020. In November 2023, Bernstein became vice president of community relations at the Jewish Federations of North America (JFNA).

== Early life and education ==
Bernstein was born in New London, Connecticut, on October 6, 1974. He attended East Lyme High School and was educated at Western Connecticut State University, where he played lacrosse and studied social work. Bernstein graduated in 1998 with a Bachelor of Arts. In 2007, he was the recipient of the Distinguished Alumni Achievement Award from Western Connecticut's School of Professional Studies.

Bernstein received his Master of Liberal Arts from the Division of Continuing Education at Harvard University in 2011. While there he sat on the Hauser Center for Nonprofit Organizations Student Advisory Board based at the Kennedy School. He is on Harvard Alumni Association Board of Directors.

== Career ==
Bernstein began his career at United Way, before working in senior positions at the American Israel Public Affairs Committee (AIPAC) and The David Project Center for Jewish Leadership. He started as the Executive Director and sat on the Israel-based senior management team for American Friends of Migdal Ohr in 2011, one of the largest NGOs in Israel.

In 2013, Bernstein was hired by Abe Foxman to be the New York Regional Director for the Anti-Defamation League based in New York City. In June 2018, the New York regional office was merged with neighboring New Jersey, putting the regions under Bernstein's leadership. In December 2019, he was appointed to be the Vice President of the Northeast Division that included the New York, New Jersey, Connecticut and Boston offices. Shortly after joining ADL, Bernstein spoke about the dangers of hate groups in the US, following the Overland Park Jewish Community Center shooting.

While serving as Regional Director for the ADL in New York, the region witnessed an unprecedented rise in antisemitism and violent hate crimes. Bernstein spoke to national media about these incidents, including antisemitic slurs by public figures, vandalism, and other attacks across the region.

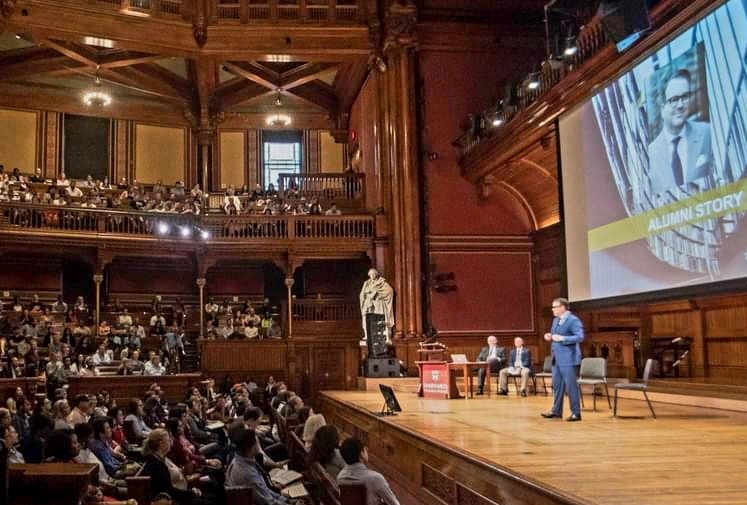
Bernstein speaking at Harvard's Sanders Theater in 2018.

In 2018, online vandalism to Mapbox's naming of Manhattan led many sites such as Snapchat and the Financial Times to display antisemitic maps on their website. Bernstein spoke with the media about the dangers such attacks can have on the Jewish community.

Throughout December 2019, there were numerous recorded attacks in the borough of Brooklyn, a shooting in New Jersey and an attack on a Rabbi's home. Bernstein was at the scene in Jersey City and Monsey shortly after the incidents. All of the incidents were said to be antisemitic attacks. Bernstein was interviewed on the incidents. The attack on the Rabbi's home in New York City became known nationally as the Monsey Hanukkah stabbing. Following the incidents, he criticized New York City Mayor Bill de Blasio for describing antisemitism as a "right-wing movement" instead of offering a "long-term solution".

Shortly after the Jersey City shootings, Bernstein and the ADL created a partnership with NAACP to reduce hate crimes in the state of New Jersey. The aims were to educate public officials and improve civil rights in the state. The move came after a number of public officials made antisemitic statements about hate crime incidents in the state.

In 2020, Bernstein spoke to the media about the rise in hate crimes as a result of the outbreak of the COVID-19 pandemic in the United States. Prior to the pandemic reaching the U.S., Bernstein spoke about how the Anti-Defamation League had uncovered early discussions about extremists planning to weaponize the virus. He called the findings "deeply disturbing, but not entirely surprising". Bernstein also commented on antisemitic incidents in the U.S. following the outbreak of COVID-19.

In June 2020, Bernstein became the CEO and National Director of the Community Security Service (CSS), an American nonprofit organization that provides security to the Jewish community in the United States, primarily through trained community volunteers.

Following antisemitic attacks in the U.S. during the 2021 Israel–Palestine crisis, Bernstein said, "We call on all Jewish institutions -- regardless of affiliation -- to heed the call to encourage its members to take basic steps towards becoming involved in volunteer security." In response to the January 2022 Colleyville synagogue hostage crisis, Bernstein said, "There's been more and more investment in security in the different major cities and communities around the country but it needs to stay that way. I think there needs to be reminders and the reminder shouldn't have to be a Colleyville."

In 2021, Bernstein was selected to The Algemeiner's "Top 100 People Positively Influencing Jewish Life" list.

In 2022, Bernstein co-founded the Interfaith Security Council, a coalition of New York City faith-based organizations that promote communal security and multifaith dialogue.

In November 2023, Jewish Federations of North America (JFNA) hired Bernstein as its inaugural vice president of community relations.

In September 2024, Bernstein spoke out about growing antisemitism in the healthcare space and in public schools. "We've been seeing health organizations, practices, schools, and associations take radical political positions whose only practical effect is to exclude Jews, as well as more blatant efforts to ostracize Jewish members of our community. We're hearing more and more concerns about this from our Federation communities across America."

On August 24, 2026, Bernstein became Chief Executive Officer of B'nai B'rith International, succeeding longtime CEO Daniel S. Mariaschin. B'nai B'rith "has a legacy unlike any other Jewish organization", Bernstein said. "It has just such a rich and deep history, but it’s not just domestic, it’s international, and the partners that the organization has developed across Europe, South America, really around the globe, [are] really enticing and interesting and really unique."

Bernstein regularly publishes opinion pieces in news outlets, including "The antisemitism horseshoe is playing out in real time", published by Fox News on November 4, 2026.
