= WXCI =

- Danbury, Connecticut; United States
- Broadcast area: Western Connecticut
- Frequency: 91.7 MHz

Programming
- Format: Educational

Ownership
- Owner: Western Connecticut State University

History
- First air date: February 28, 1973; 52 years ago
- Former call signs: WCST
- Call sign meaning: "XCI" is 91 in Roman numerals

Technical information
- Licensing authority: FCC
- Facility ID: 71786
- Class: A
- ERP: 3,000 watts
- HAAT: 67 meters (220 ft)
- Transmitter coordinates: 41°23′42.3″N 73°29′12.4″W

Links
- Public license information: Public file; LMS
- Webcast: Listen live; Listen live (smartphone)
- Website: www.wxci.org

WXCI (91.7 FM) is a student radio station broadcasting an educational format. Licensed to Danbury, Connecticut, United States, the station serves the Danbury area. The station is owned by Western Connecticut State University.

WXCI broadcasts to Connecticut and New York at 3,000 watts with a stereo transmitter on WCSU's Westside Campus, while the actual studio is located on the Midtown campus. It also streams its broadcasts on the Web.

== History ==
The radio station obtained its FCC license to operate on February 28, 1973. The station began at 12:30 pm local time with a student, Rob Abbett nicknamed Rabbett, with the words, "Good afternoon, this is FM radio station WXCI in Danbury beginning its first broadcast day." Before Abbett threw the switch to FM broadcasting, the station was AM carrier current and PA system in dorms and student center and, was at the time, located in Memorial Hall with the call letters WSCT. This station was started in 1968 by Bob Wilson. However, by 1973, events progressed to FM radio broadcast initially transmitting at 10 watts of power, WXCI upgraded to 760 watts in 1978.

In 1982, WXCI was one of the first FM stations to focus on alternative rock, a format now common among US college radio stations. As one of a handful of stations playing alternative rock and new wave in the US in the early 1980s, WXCI helped popularize new bands and artists such as REM, Talking Heads, Elvis Costello, U2, Culture Club, Duran Duran, and Black Flag.
