= Samuel Ancell =

English military writer and soldier

- Born: around 1760
- Died: 19 October 1802
- Occupations: Soldier and military writer

Samuel Ancell (c. 1760 – 19 October 1802) was an English soldier and military writer.

== Biography ==
He joined the British Army at an early age, and served with the 58th regiment during the Great Siege of Gibraltar from 1779 to 1783. In 1784, while in Liverpool, Ancell published 'A Circumstantial Journal of the long and tedious Blockade and Siege of Gibraltar from 12 September 1779 (the day the garrison opened their batteries against the Spaniards) to the 23rd day of February 1783.' The book, which is in the form of a series of letters to the author's brother, went through five editions. Ancell apparently retired from active service soon after his return home, and opened a military commission agency in Dublin. In October 1801 he produced there the first part of a monthly military magazine, called the 'Monthly Military Companion.' The periodical continued publishing until Ancell's death on 19 October 1802. In addition to the articles on fortifications, military history, and tactics that he contributed to the magazine, he also contributed songs set to music of his own composition.
