= Business relations =

Business relationships are connections between stakeholders in the process of businesses, such as employer–employee relationships, managers as well as outsourced business partners. The association of businesses began relationships that have been constructed through communication channels such as the likes of telephones, personal contacts, and e-mails. These types of contacts are maintained and deepened through similar channels in internal businesses and organizations.

Within the business of this era, the aim of many businesses whether small or internationally established is to develop a target to motivate all types of employees to form a professional relationship with one another which will have many benefits to the business which will strongly lead to success. Furthermore, external business relationships are essential to any organization as they will improve the companies image, develop brand loyalty, and improve sales.

There are many different forms through which business relations are maintained. Primarily, these relations as stated previously, are constructed through communication channels however face-to-face interactions and the social media are seen to be the most effective allowing people to form stronger ties. There have been many research studies suggesting that multiple modes of communication are important to build strong business relationships. Face-to-face interactions are typically the most effective due to the in-person communication aspect, as it allows people to form stronger ties. The more communication and interaction there is between two entities, the stronger the business relationship builds.

More specifically, internal business relations are important to maintain, as loyal employees can benefit the business by increasing profits. Moreover, loyal employees allow better relationships to be established with key suppliers and distributors and the business will be able to retain its customer satisfaction which will influence the service quality. The commitment of employees is therefore highly recommended for further positive influence on the business.

== The importance of loyalty and trust in a business ==
Business relations are important both externally and internally. Research has shown that "trust" is one of the most critical factors to develop and enhance effective long-term relations. Whether its with other business networks, individuals in a partnered firm or employees within the organization; who with a strong positive relationship can increase one or more of the following; long-term stock market, employment rate, productivity, overall performance and other measures as stated, with companies that are more aware and engaged with CSR matters, leading to a better performance level. Moreover, researchers of organizational behavior stress about organizational effectiveness being linked with employee's attribution. Therefore, creating an environment with employee satisfaction will hinder and solve such disagreements and arguments between one employee to another and the data will be significantly preferable.

Moreover, as the business environment is constantly changing, it is causing firms to address new entrepreneurial innovative ideas that could out-stand them from the competition. Trust plays an important role in this as with developed business relations it allows one to react and initiate such innovative ideas to the business more effectively. There are two different types of trust that exist between business relations that affect one another, firstly " interpersonal" which refers to the individuals trust in one organization in other in the partnered organization. Secondly " inter organizational " which refers to members from the organization having a collective orientation or culture of trust towards a partner in a different organization.

With loyalty established internally in the organization and the employer aims and directs constant communication, the employer will form a strong relationship and bond between the employees and organizations; allowing them to feel more attached and sense commitment. This will result in a more motivated group of employees that will deliver high-quality services which is one of the key characteristics of "social exchange". Delivering high-quality services is essential as it allows organizations to gain customer satisfaction which gives a positive impact on the firm as customer satisfaction boosts customer loyalty and future behaviors. Customers become less concerned and sensitive towards prices as by being satisfied they tend to pay and tolerate such an increase in prices which in the long-term establishes a positive reputation as well as increases the economic performance of the firm. Therefore, loyalty is essential in order to gain a strong employee relationship which can link to having better customer loyalty, with time resulting in a more organized business that has a good flow of communication both internally and externally.

== Communication and its effect on business relations ==
Communication contact plays an important role in reshaping the internal and external management in the organization. Communication cooperation internally can encourage " processes, strategies, activities, policies and programs" to be developed which enforce information and communication systems. This will have an effect on external relations which is considered to be rather important. Furthermore, establishing good communication at the beginning of the business between the employees will provide the business with a positive reputation in the industry towards its rivalries and competitors in the market. Therefore, this could be constructed through the use of effective training programs and measurement systems.

Focusing on the internal aspect of communications will allow external networks to trust the business by having the right perspective on the processes which may occur. This is due to the fact that communication is vital to sustain, especially when partnering with another company; whether its through merging or just joining a particular project. Therefore, the ability to associate with the right businesses is relevant in order to keep the company more innovative; as networks allow for " an effective transfer of information". In addition, by gaining connections through networks; it can provide employee's, managers or owners to develop personal networks that can benefit oneself in the long term whether its towards a new entrepreneurial business plan, a project or even an incident that may occur within the business. An example is an entrepreneurial designer who used his personal connections in the industry to seek a potential supplier in China to continue developing his new business plan. This emphasizes on why obtaining and sustaining relations is beneficial for a business. Moreover, communication links with relationship marketing perfectly as both focus towards activities directed as establishing, developing and maintaining successful exchanges with customers and other constituents. (Morgan and Hunt 1994).

On the other hand, even though communication is a key concept to any business. Organizations should not fully depend on establishing only a few relations and shutting down others that may be beneficial, due to the fact that networking and developing relationships should not have limits. Engaging with new businesses frequently can provide positive change within the business by introducing new concepts and innovative ideas that keep up with the changes that take place in the industry regularly. Thus, businesses should accept some new organizations as well as keep close to old ones in order to sustain their position in the industry and adapt to the changes that take place.

To further extend, there are multiple ways of communicating within a business to improve relations whether its through technology, discussions in the office or through annual reports. More specifically, organizations are recommending the use of technological devices such as videoconferencing and teleconferencing which allow individuals to not be present at the same place but still be able to interact with one another, similarly the use of laptops and such. Owners and managers consequently highlight the importance of communication in the business, especially in large organizations as there are longer layers in the hierarchy as well as more commitment.

'The effect of Social Media on business relationships'

Nowadays, Social Media plays an important role in establishing relationships. It is reported that there is 1.5 billion social media users globally, with at least 70% of companies using some form of social media (McKinsey Global Institute). Many connections can be constructed through organizations such as “ LinkedIn” where one can form new relations that can be beneficial in the longterm and contacts are usually made between individuals from different businesses. Moreover, the millennial generation more specifically are actively involved with social media on a daily basis and with the continuous change that is occurring in the industry, social media is essential for improving business performance and helping firms achieve a competitive advantage. In addition, (Cross and Katzenbach 2012 ) found that 90% of the information used for decision making came from informal networks rather than formal reports.

== Relationships with different business sizes ==
Business relations within a small organization differs from the regular as it is a mix of both formal and informal management. However, this depends on the internal management and more specifically the owners/managers own personal preferences. Even though this style of management is seen to be less flexible, it is more beneficial towards expanding in size and profitability. Many believe that with owners/managers, having both a formal and informal approach operations will occur more efficiently; resulting with a better positive outcome causing growth, an increase in profitability and a positive reputation between other competitors in the market, which is what every small business intends to achieve. In addition, small business control more than half of the market but many are seen to fail due to poor planning and inefficient external business relations.

Small businesses external relations are essential for success, an external relationship is defined as " a commercially oriented connected between a small business and other two organizations". The most known types are alliances and networks, a relationship based on mutual interests and benefits as well as forming relationships within different organizations together into one. An example of forming an external relationship based on networking is engaging with a foreign organization, to increase financial gain and market share within the industry. This emphasizes the importance of forming external relationships, as this can push the business into having a more effective; higher position in the market, ahead of its competitors with greater brand awareness and recognition. Small businesses have a difficult time building good business relations as business relations is connected with such marketing performances and the need of having a good starting profit, time, planning and marketing expertise, therefore establishing strong external social ties from different organizations can strengthen the overall performance.

== See also ==
- Ford, David (2011). Managing business relationships. Wiley. ISBN 978-0470721094.
- Benedetti, Ksenija (2008). Simfonija forme.
- Gray, Douglas (1993). Have You Got What It Takes?: The Entrepreneur's Complete Self-Assessment Guide. Self-Counsel Business Series. Self Counsel. ISBN 978-0889082854.
- Mullich, Joe. "The New Face of Face-to-Face Meetings". The Wall Street Journal.
