= Community Security Service =

American nonprofit organization

Community Security Service (CSS)
- Formation: 2007
- Type: Nonprofit
- Website: thecss.org

Community Security Service (CSS) is an American nonprofit organization that provides security to the Jewish community in the United States, primarily through trained community volunteers. The group was founded in 2007. As of December 2022, CSS fields over 2,000 active volunteers in more than 150 synagogues across the U.S.

In 2021, CSS helped the NYPD identify the suspect responsible for a series of vandalism incidents targeting synagogues in the Bronx.

In November 2022, CSS worked with law enforcement and community partners including Community Security Trust, the Community Security Initiative, and the Anti-Defamation League in the arrest at New York City's Penn Station of two men, in possession of weapons, who were plotting to attack the Jewish community.

== Partnerships ==
In September 2020, CSS and the Community Security Initiative (CSI) announced an "operational partnership" to "synchronize field operations, coordinate deployments of volunteers, share intelligence, and conduct both joint training and joint tabletop exercises." CSI is a joint initiative of UJA-Federation of New York and the Jewish Community Relations Council of New York.

In April 2021, CSS co-founded the Interfaith Security Council, a coalition of New York City faith-based organizations that promotes communal security and combats violent extremism.

In September 2021, the Anti-Defamation League and CSS announced a partnership to improve the safety of the American Jewish community.

In March 2022, CSS announced it had entered into a memorandum of understanding with the Secure Community Network (SCN), which "recognizes CSS as the volunteer security partner of SCN and calls on both organizations to promote each other’s efforts."
