= Farooq Kathwari =

American businessman (born 1944)

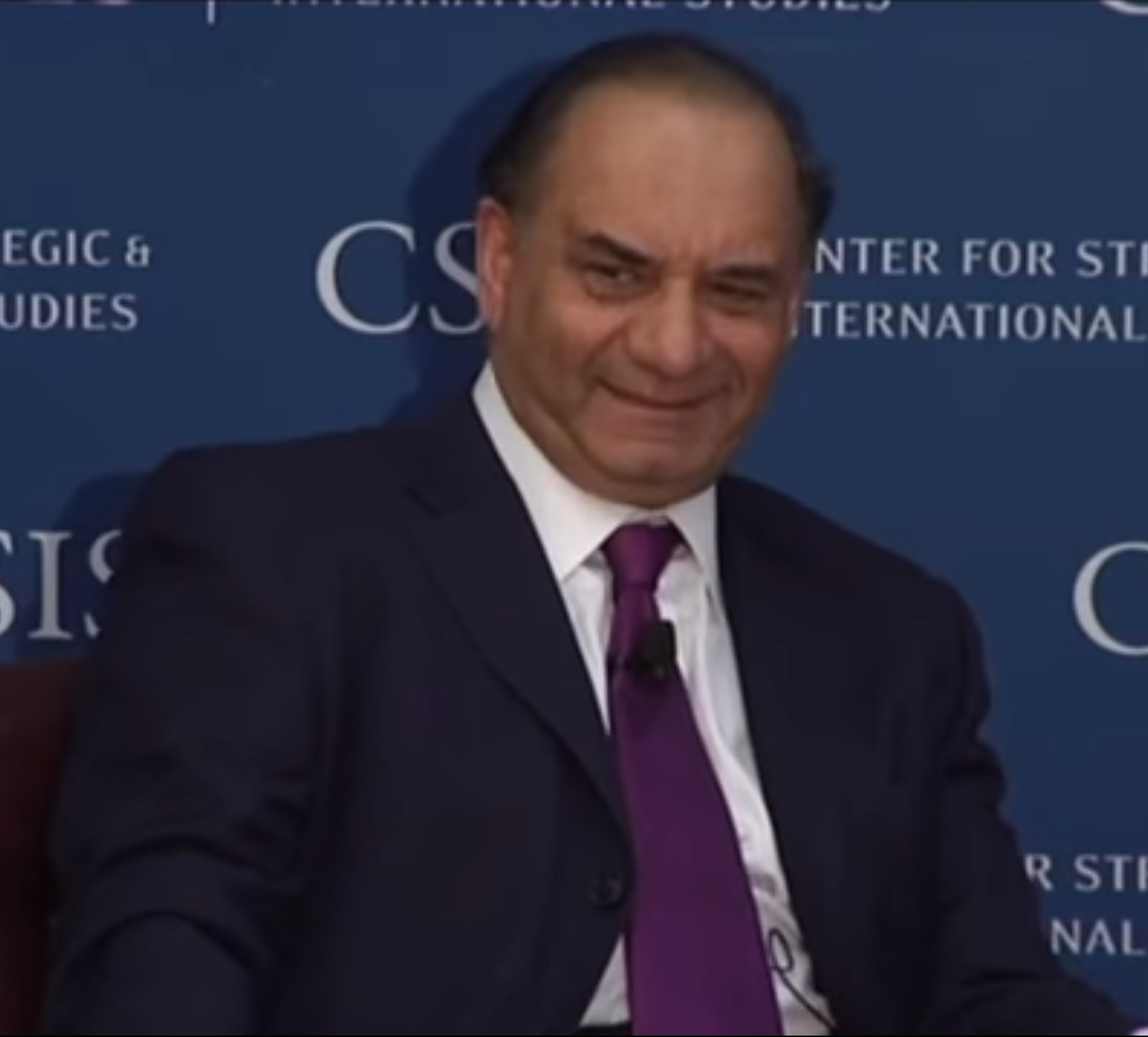
- Kathwari in 2013

Personal details
- Born: 1944 (age 81–82) Srinagar, Jammu and Kashmir State, British India (present-day India)
- Education: University of Kashmir (BA); New York University (MBA)

Farooq Kathwari (born 1944), is a Kashmiri-American businessman and philanthropist who is the former Chairman, CEO, and President of Ethan Allen Interiors as of 11/4/2026.

== Early life and education ==
Kathwari was born in Srinagar, Kashmir, to a father from a long-time merchant family and a mother from one of Kashmir’s prominent families. In his teens, he was a passionate cricketer and later became the captain of the cricket team at his alma mater, Kashmir University, where he majored in literature and political science. He emigrated to the United States in 1965, following his father, who had moved to New York in 1964. There, he went on to pursue a graduate degree in business at New York University, which he completed in 1968.

== Career ==
His early career began modestly. He first took a job at a factory in Queens, which he believed produced shower stalls, but his employment ended quickly when he was dismissed upon receiving his first paycheck. He then responded to a bookkeeping job advertisement, despite lacking prior knowledge of the field. On his first day, a secretary provided him with a brief introduction to bookkeeping during the lunch break, enabling him to start the role.

After receiving his graduate degree from NYU, he began his career as a financial analyst at Bear Stearns and later became a vice president at New Court Securities. Alongside his finance career, he operated a business importing handicrafts from Kashmir, which were sold wholesale to Bloomingdale’s.

In the early 1970s, he established a partnership with Ethan Allen to supply Kashmiri crewelwork for the company’s upholstery fabrics, creating a firm called KEA International. Ethan Allen acquired the company in 1980 and appointed Kathwari as a vice president. He advanced to executive vice president in 1983, president and chief operating officer in 1985, and was named chairman and chief executive officer in 1988.

He has been leading Ethan Allen Interiors since 1985, and four years later he formed a group to purchase Ethan Allen from Interco, a conglomerate, and subsequently took the company public. Under Kathwari's leadership, Ethan Allen Interiors has been transformed into a leading manufacturer and retailer of home furnishings in the United States.

== Personal life ==
Farooq Kathwari is married to Farida, who is also from Kashmir. They have 2 sons, one of whom was killed while visiting Jalalabad, Afghanistan, during the Afghan Civil War, and a daughter. They live in New Rochelle, New York. He also owns a fruit farm in Columbia County, New York.
