= Markus Gottschlich =

Austrian-American jazz pianist and composer

- Born: Vienna, Austria
- Genres: Jazz
- Occupation: Musician
- Instrument: Piano
- Years active: 2000s–present
- Website: markusgottschlich.com

Markus Gottschlich is an Austrian-American jazz pianist, composer, educator, and arts executive. He has served as executive director of the Warehouse Arts District Association in St. Petersburg, Florida since 2022.

Gottschlich is a Steinway Artist and has performed and recorded internationally. Previously, he served as the artistic director of the Miami Beach Jazz Festival.

== Early life and education ==
Gottschlich was born and grew up in Vienna. He began playing the piano at the age of five. He moved to the United States after high school and attended Admiral Farragut Academy in Florida.

Gottschlich graduated with a degree in international business and political relations from Western Connecticut State University.

He studied piano with Mike Gerber in South Florida.

He later became Director of Music Operations at Jazz House Kids in New Jersey.

== Career ==
=== Arts executive ===
Gottschlich became executive director of the Warehouse Arts District Association in St. Petersburg, Florida, in 2022. He created educational and outreach programs at the association, focused on increasing access to the arts. In 2024, Gottschlich participated in grassroots advocacy efforts that contributed to St. Petersburg securing $695,000 in new arts funding following major state budget cuts.

In 2015, Gottschlich founded Jazz Academy Miami, an educational initiative offering jazz workshops and masterclasses in collaboration with the Miami Beach Jazz Festival. The program featured international artists such as Australian trumpeter James Morrison.

Gottschlich later served as executive director of the New Mexico Jazz Workshop (NMJW), where he oversaw the expansion of its educational programs and its multi-arts festivals in the Southwestern United States.

=== Musician ===
Gottschlich's work as a jazz pianist and composer combines European musical influences with American jazz traditions. He has performed at international festivals such as the Vienna Jazz Festival, Jarasum Jazz Festival in South Korea, Saulkrasti Jazz Festival in Latvia, and the St. Petersburg Jazz Festival in Florida.

Gottschlich has released three albums as a bandleader. In 2013, he released Of Places Between. All About Jazz commented on his ability to merge diverse musical traditions, writing that he "doesn't just toy with the places between; he loves them and lives for them", referencing his integration of songo, samba, and classical influences on the album. DownBeat described his dub-reggae treatment of Billy Strayhorn's "A Flower Is a Lovesome Thing" on the same release as a "brave move" that illustrates his cross-genre approach. His 2020 album, Found Sounds, features guest contributions from musicians including trumpeter Bobby Shew. All About Jazz described Found Sounds as "picturesque" for its blend of field recordings and improvisation; Making a Scene observed his ability to move from "percussive and powerful" to "elegant and graceful" passages within a single performance.

== Discography ==
- Of Places Between (2013; featuring Federico Britos)
- Found Sounds (2020; featuring Bobby Shew)
- When the Day is Done (2008)
