= Rahul Jindal =

American doctor

Rahul M. Jindal
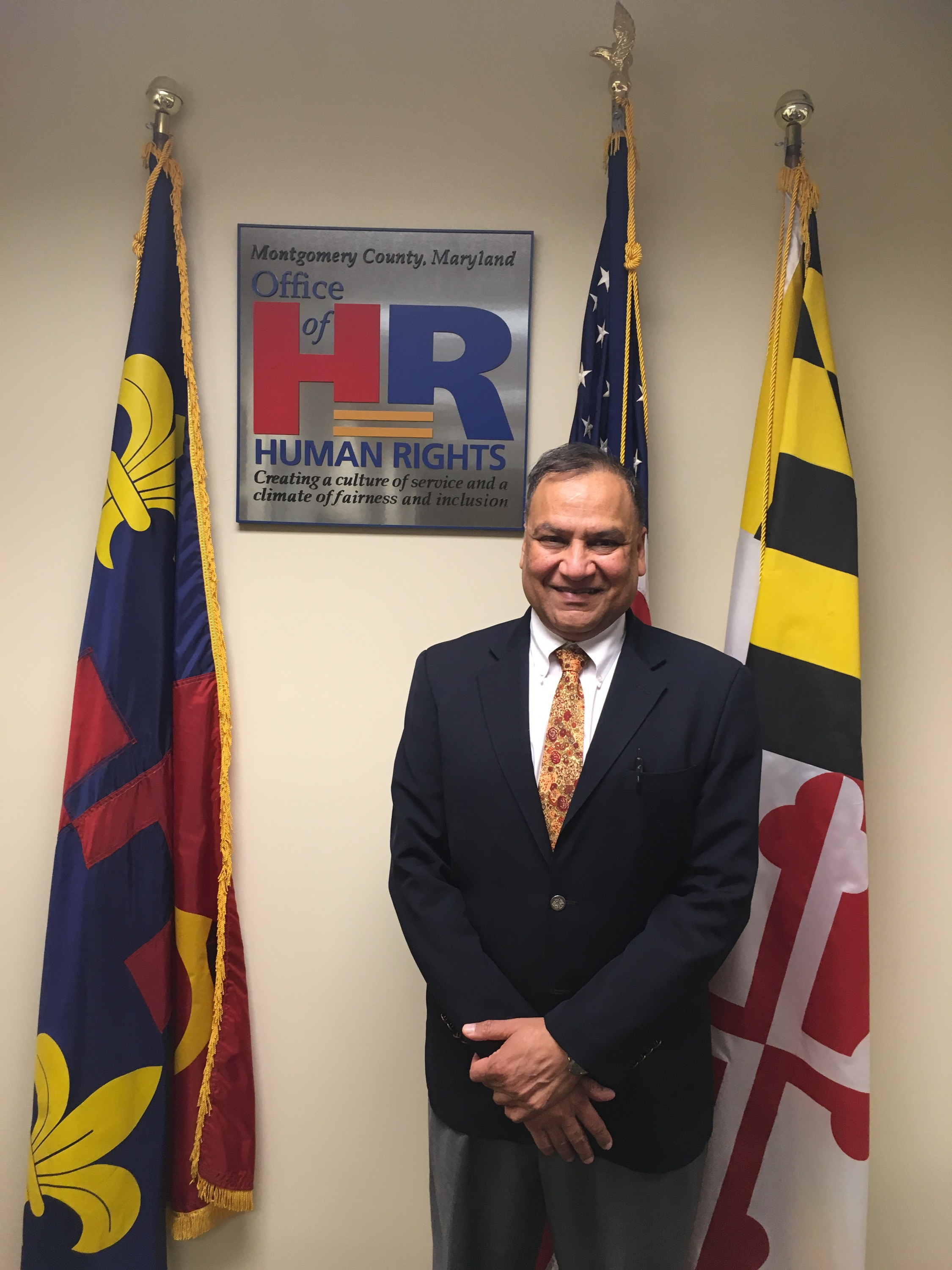
- Jindal in 2019
- Born: June 16, 1955 (age 71); New Delhi, India
- Education: Gujarat University (MBBS), B. J. Medical College (MS), Royal College of Surgeons of Edinburgh (FRCS), University of Oxford (MSc), Colorado Technical University (MBA), Middlesex University (PhD), American College of Surgeons (FACS)
- Awards: Fulbright-Nehru Distinguished Chair (2016, 2020, 2024); Ellis Island Medal of Honor; Outstanding American by Choice; Carnegie Great Immigrant – Great American; IMPACT award by the Uniformed Services University; Alpha (AOA) USU Chapter – 2018 Faculty Mentor of the Year; International Leadership Foundation
- Scientific career
- Fields: General Surgery, Transplant Surgery, Global Health & Global Surgery
- Website: USUHS Faculty/Staff page

Rahul M. Jindal (born June 16, 1955) is an Indian born American transplant surgeon, professor, humanitarian and author. In 2008, he set up a renal replacement therapy program which led to the only comprehensive kidney transplant and dialysis program in the Republic of Guyana. His team added the only corneal transplant program in Guyana in 2010. Both these programs have completed 10 years and are sustained by local doctors. As of 2019, he is a professor in the Department of Surgery at Uniformed Services University, Bethesda, Maryland. Since 2008, he has been an attending transplant surgeon at Walter Reed National Military Medical Center where he performs kidney transplants and mentors senior-level students and residents in surgical sciences and global health. Since 2014, he has been a Commissioner at the Montgomery County Office of Human Rights, Maryland. He also served as Commissioner for the Governor's Office on Service and Volunteerism in Maryland. Jindal is also an adjunct Professor of Global Health at the Indian Institute of Public Health, Gandhinagar.

== History ==
Jindal was born in New Delhi, India to a physician father and homemaker mother. He obtained seven degrees, including one from Wolfson College, Oxford, and the Royal College of Surgeons of Edinburgh, fellowship of the American College of Surgeons and a PhD from Middlesex University located in the UK. Afterward he moved to the United States to pursue his medical career and in 2006 he became a naturalized citizen of the United States. Later he became the first person to perform a kidney transplant in the Republic of Guyana. Jindal and his medical team performed the first ever pancreas islet cell transplant after trauma on an active duty soldier. In 2015, Jindal's team added a corneal transplant program to their existing work in Guyana.

Jindal and his team also performed the first kidney transplant in the Republic of Suriname in 2019. Dr. Jindal continues his outreach as visiting professor to several universities in the UK and in India. Dr Jindal teaches a course on Global Health Diplomacy at the University Of Oxford, UK held every year. Dr Jindal proposed the concept of seva (a Sanskrit word) - a service that is performed without any expectation of result or award for performing it - to prevent physician burnout. In 2016, Dr Jindal conceived the Surgical Accredited & Trained Healthcare Initiative (SATHI), which demonstrates how community healthcare workers with merely 8 years of formal schooling and training for a short period could reduce unmet surgical needs in slums of Ahmedabad, India. In 2014, Jindal lead a team of medical professionals from the Uniformed Services University, to India, including the Armed Forces College of Medicine, Pune, which resulted in several MOUs. Dr. Jindal endowed a scholarship (Rahul M. Jindal travel fellowship to India) to some medical students each year for month-long electives.

== Awards and honors ==
In 2013, Jindal was awarded Outstanding American by Choice by the United States Citizenship and Immigration Services. In 2013, Jindal was given an award of Excellence for his humanitarian mission in the Republic of Guyana by the Guyana's president. In 2013, Jindal was recognized for Excellence in Community Service by International Leadership Foundation (Washington, DC).

In 2015, Rahul Jindal was awarded the Ellis Island Medal of Honor. In 2015, Dr Jindal was awarded the prestigious Fulbright-Nehru Distinguished Chair to India. In 2015, The Federal Asian Pacific American Council (FAPAC) recognized Jindal for outstanding individual achievement in promoting diversity and equal opportunities in the work place. In 2015, Dr Jindal was awarded the IMPACT award by the Uniformed Services University for making a significant contribution to education, research and international outreach.

In 2018, Jindal was awarded Faculty Mentor of the Year by the Alpha Omega Alpha Uniformed Services University Chapter.

In 2019, Jindal was named one of 36 Great Immigrants, chosen from all walks of life by the Carnegie Corporation of New York.

In 2020, Jindal was awarded the Fulbright senior scholarship to continue his teaching and humanitarian projects in collaboration with the Indian Institute of Public Health Gandhinagar.

In 2021, Jindal was a member of the advisory Board, XPrize.

In 2024, Dr Jindal was awarded the Fulbright specialist scholarship to consolidate his humanitarian projects.

== Books ==
- Dr Rahul M Jindal, Fulbright-Nehru Distinguished Chair: Personal Journal to Land of Birth – India, (2019, ASIN : B082YG2CZG)
- Managing Seva (selfless service) in Times of Great Change, (2015, ISBN 9781491781531)
- The Story of First Kidney Transplant in Guyana, South America, and Lessons Learnt for Other Developing Countries, (2009, ISBN 9781440173875)
- The Struggle for life: A psychological perspective of kidney disease and transplantation, by LS Baines and RM Jindal, (Praeger Series in Health Psychology, 2003 ISBN 0865693234)

== Public Service ==
The Governor of Maryland appointed Dr Jindal as Commissioner, Governor's Office on Service and Volunteerism, Maryland (2013-7).

Dr. Jindal was appointed as Commissioner to the Human Rights Commission, Montgomery County, Maryland (2014- onwards).

== Humanitarian Works ==
To commemorate the 10th anniversary of 9/11 in 2011, Jindal led a national day of blood and bone marrow drives sponsored by about 600 Hindu temples throughout North America. Results showed that over 2500 units of blood and bone marrow samples were collected yearly; most donors were first time donors and are likely to donate again.

In 2013, Rahul Jindal and his team established the first kidney and corneal transplant programs in the Republics of Guyana and in Suriname, which are now wholly sustained by local efforts. Guyana has now become the hub for kidney and corneal transplantation in the Caribbean basin.

In 2020, Rahul Jindal conceived the Surgical Accredited & Trained Healthcare Initiative (SATHI), which demonstrates how community healthcare workers could reduce unmet surgical needs. SATHIs were able to convert 60% of unmet surgical to met needs who then underwent surgery/treatment under Ayushman Bharat (India's universal health coverage). This would translate into improved quality of life, longevity, and earning capacity. Jindal and his team are now scaling up this initiative to 300K slum-dwellers, which could serve as a template for other cities in India. Several publications have arisen from this work.

He is the Co-Chair of SEVAK Program www.sevakproject.org in which his team trains high school students in good preventative measures and diagnosis of diabetes and hypertension in rural areas of India and Guyana, where there are no medical facilities.

== Publications ==
Jindal has been involved in over 200 peer-reviewed publications since 1992. Publications include JAMA Surgery, Gastroenterology, Hepatology, Urology, Transplantation, and Diabetes.

Dr. Jindal's research work and publications have been cited in text books and have been accompanied by editorials and press releases by the American Society of Nephrology and other specialist journals. This body of work has led to change in the practice of transplantation in some areas. Recent publications have advocated global surgery, ethics, humanism and Human Rights. Jindal's h-index is 44 & i10-index is 135 on Google Scholar which is above average for a surgeon.
