= Ancell School of Business =

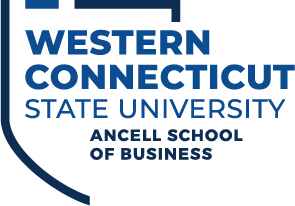
- Type: Public
- Parent institution: Western Connecticut State University
- Dean: Yaseen Hayajneh
- Location: Danbury, Connecticut, United States
- Website: www.wcsu.edu/asb/

The Ancell school of business (ASB) is the business school at Western Connecticut State University.

Nathan S. Ancell, a major benefactor of the university and president of Ethan Allen, was honored with his name in memorial. The Ancell School of Business is primarily located in the West Side Campus Classroom Building, which also houses the Young Library and the Jane Goodall Center for Excellence in Environmental Studies.

== Academic departments ==
- Accounting
- Finance
- Management
- Management Information Systems
- Marketing
- Division of Justice and Law Administration

== Degrees Offered ==
- Bachelor of Business Administration (BBA)
- Bachelor of Science (B.S.)
- Master of Business Administration (M.B.A.)
- Master of Health Administration (M.H.A.)
- Master of Science in Justice Administration (M.S.J.A.)
- Paralegal

== Areas of Study ==
- Accounting
  - Financial Accounting
  - Managerial Accounting
- Finance
- Justice and Law Administration
- Management
  - Small Business and Entrepreneurship
  - Supply Chain Management
  - Human Resource Management
  - Supervisory Management
- Management Information Systems
  - Information Security Management
- Marketing
  - E-commerce and Internet Marketing
