= The Welcoming Center =

American nonprofit organization

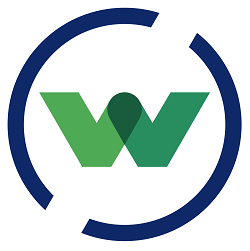
- Formation: 2003
- Founder: Anne O’Callaghan
- Legal status: Non-Profit
- Key people: Peter Gonzales, President & CEO
- Website: welcomingcenter.org

The Welcoming Center is a nonprofit organization based in Philadelphia, Pennsylvania, US.

Its mission is to promote inclusive economic growth through immigrant integration. This is based on studies that show that immigrants strengthen the productivity, profitability, and stability of the region, and contribute to Pennsylvania's economic growth.

== History ==
The Welcoming Center was founded in 2003 by Anne O'Callaghan to address the barriers that immigrants face in finding employment in their new country.

Trained as a physical therapist at Trinity College Dublin School of Medicine and the Oswestry and North Staffordshire School of Physiotherapy in Ireland, O'Callaghan came to the United States in 1970.

As a physical therapist with foreign credentials, O'Callaghan faced numerous hurdles in becoming licensed to practice in Pennsylvania. After successfully completing the long process to become licensed, O'Callaghan worked in the physical therapy field for twenty years as a practitioner, college-level instructor, and service director. She brought her entrepreneurial skills to the founding and building of a software development company to serve the home health care industry.

In 1999, O'Callaghan began volunteering at a small center for Irish immigrants in Delaware County, Pennsylvania. It was there that she saw that there were many other immigrants like her who were having trouble navigating the job market. Faced with the need for a centralized organization promoting immigrants' economic self-sufficiency and civic engagement, O'Callaghan founded the Welcoming Center for New Pennsylvanians in 2003.

In 2021, the organization announced that it had renamed itself to The Welcoming Center.

== Services ==
The Welcoming Center offers the following services:

=== Workforce development ===
The Welcoming Center provides employment services as well as contextualized ESL classes.

=== Entrepreneurship and innovation ===
The Welcoming Center provides technical assistance to help American-born and immigrant entrepreneurs start or expand their businesses.

=== Community engagement ===
The Welcoming Center prepares immigrants with the tools necessary to engage in the civic life of Philadelphia.

== Solas Awards ==
The Solas Awards are an annual honor bestowed upon individuals by The Welcoming Center for their contributions to improving the quality of life for immigrants to Pennsylvania. Solas means "light" in Irish.

Some previous honorees include:

- Alberto Ibargüen, President & CEO of the John S. and James L. Knight Foundation
- Mayor Jim Kenney, Mayor of Philadelphia
- Daniel K. Fitzpatrick and Citizens Bank
- Ajay Raju, Chairman & CEO of Dilworth Paxson LLP
- Mike Pearson, Founder and CEO of Union Packaging
- Ruth Dietz Eni, chairman and Chief Executive of Dietz & Watson
