= Domestic Prosperity and Global Freedom Act =

- Long title: To provide for expedited approval of exportation of natural gas to World Trade Organization countries, and for other purposes.
- Announced in: the 113th United States Congress
- Sponsored by: Rep. Cory Gardner (R, CO-4)
- Number of co-sponsors: 23

Codification
- U.S.C. sections affected: 15 U.S.C. § 717b, 19 U.S.C. § 3501

Legislative history
- Introduced in the House as H.R. 6 by Rep. Cory Gardner (R, CO-4) on March 6, 2014; Committee consideration by United States House Committee on Energy and Commerce, United States House Energy Subcommittee on Energy and Power

The Domestic Prosperity and Global Freedom Act (H.R. 6) would direct the United States Department of Energy (DOE) to issue a decision on an application for authorization to export natural gas within 90 days after the later of: (1) the end of the comment period for that decision as set forth in the Federal Register, or (2) the date of enactment of this Act.

The bill was introduced into the United States House of Representatives during the 113th United States Congress.

== Background ==
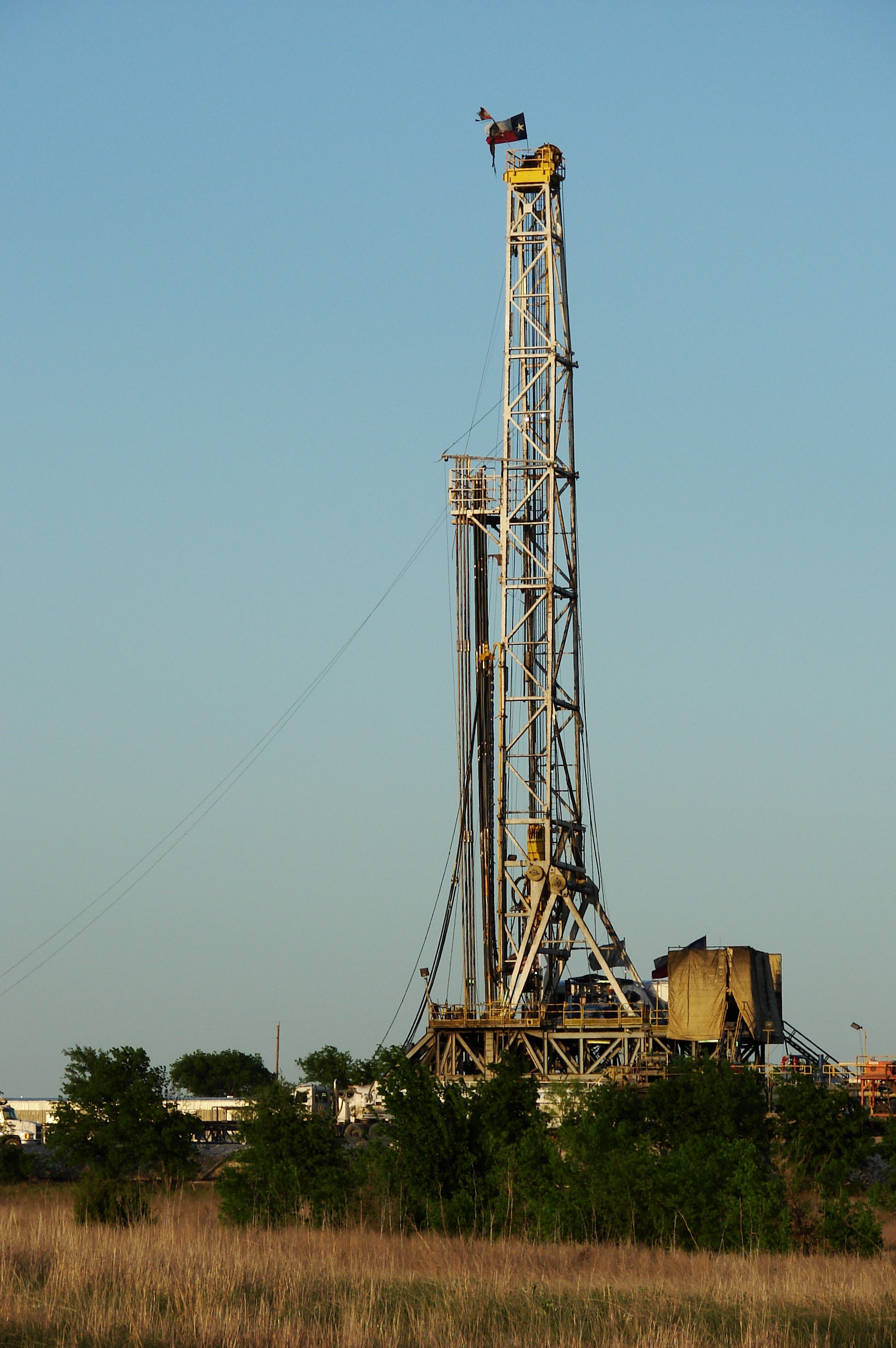
A natural gas drilling rig in Texas

Natural gas is a fossil fuel formed when layers of buried plants, gases, and animals are exposed to intense heat and pressure over thousands of years. The energy that the plants originally obtained from the sun is stored in the form of chemical bonds in natural gas. Natural gas is a nonrenewable resource because it cannot be replenished on a human time frame. Natural gas is a hydrocarbon gas mixture consisting primarily of methane, but commonly includes varying amounts of other higher alkanes and even a lesser percentage of carbon dioxide, nitrogen, and hydrogen sulfide. Natural gas is an energy source often used for heating, cooking, and electricity generation. It is also used as fuel for vehicles and as a chemical feedstock in the manufacture of plastics and other commercially important organic chemicals.

Natural gas is found in deep underground rock formations or associated with other hydrocarbon reservoirs in coal beds and as methane clathrates. Petroleum is another resource and fossil fuel found in close proximity to, and with natural gas. Most natural gas was created over time by two mechanisms: biogenic and thermogenic. Biogenic gas is created by methanogenic organisms in marshes, bogs, landfills, and shallow sediments. Deeper in the earth, at greater temperature and pressure, thermogenic gas is created from buried organic material.

Before natural gas can be used as a fuel, it must be processed to remove impurities, including water, to meet the specifications of marketable natural gas. The by-products of this processing include ethane, propane, butanes, pentanes, and higher molecular weight hydrocarbons, hydrogen sulfide (which may be converted into pure sulfur), carbon dioxide, water vapor, and sometimes helium and nitrogen.

The world's first industrial extraction of natural gas started at Fredonia, New York, USA in 1825. By 2009, 66 trillion cubic meters (or 8%) had been used out of the total 850 trillion cubic meters of estimated remaining recoverable reserves of natural gas. Based on an estimated 2015 world consumption rate of about 3.4 trillion cubic meters of gas per year, the total estimated remaining economically recoverable reserves of natural gas would last 250 years.

== Provisions of the bill ==
This summary is based largely on the summary provided by the Congressional Research Service, a public domain source.

The Domestic Prosperity and Global Freedom Act would direct the United States Department of Energy (DOE) to issue a decision on an application for authorization to export natural gas within 90 days after the later of: (1) the end of the comment period for that decision as set forth in the Federal Register, or (2) the date of enactment of this Act.

The bill would grant original and exclusive jurisdiction to the U.S. Court of Appeals for the circuit in which the export facility under an application will be located over any civil action for the review of: (1) a DOE order about the application, or (2) DOE failure to issue a decision on the application.

The bill would require the Court, if it finds in a civil action that DOE has failed to issue a decision on an application, to order DOE to issue one within 30 days.

The bill would require the Court to set any civil action brought under this Act on the docket, for expedited consideration, as soon as practical after the filing date of the initial pleading.

The bill would amend the Natural Gas Act to set, as a condition for approval of any authorization to export liquefied natural gas (LNG), that the DOE Secretary require the applicant to disclose publicly the specific destination or destinations of any such authorized LNG exports.

== Congressional Budget Office report ==
This summary is based largely on the summary provided by the Congressional Budget Office, as ordered reported by the House Committee on Energy and Commerce on April 30, 2014. This is a public domain source.

Under the Natural Gas Act, the Department of Energy (DOE) regulates imports and exports of natural gas. H.R. 6 would amend that act to specify a deadline for DOE to issue decisions on certain applications for authority to export natural gas. Specifically, H.R. 6 would require DOE to issue a decision on any existing application within 90 days of either the enactment date of H.R. 6 or the close of the comment period pertaining to the application, whichever is later.

Based on information from DOE, the Congressional Budget Office (CBO) estimates that enacting H.R. 6 would not significantly affect the federal budget. The bill would not materially alter DOE's regulatory responsibilities under the Natural Gas Act, and CBO estimates that any change in DOE's administrative costs, which are subject to the availability of appropriated funds, would be negligible because of the small number of permits involved. H.R. 6 would not affect direct spending or revenues; therefore, pay-as-you-go procedures do not apply.

H.R. 6 contains no intergovernmental mandates as defined in the Unfunded Mandates Reform Act (UMRA) and would impose no costs on state, local, or tribal governments.

The bill would impose a private-sector mandate, as defined in UMRA, on entities seeking DOE approval to export natural gas. The Natural Gas Act requires entities seeking to export natural gas to obtain approval from DOE. The bill would require that applicants, as a condition for approval, publicly disclose the countries that would receive the exports. According to DOE, fewer than 100 applications have been approved or are pending for export of natural gas as of March 2014. Because the number of applications for export is small and the cost to disclose destination countries is low, CBO estimates that the cost of the mandate would fall well below the annual threshold established in UMRA for private-sector mandates ($152 million in 2014, adjusted annually for inflation).

== Procedural history ==
The Domestic Prosperity and Global Freedom Act was introduced into the United States House of Representatives on March 6, 2014, by Rep. Cory Gardner (R, CO-4). The bill was referred to the United States House Committee on Energy and Commerce and the United States House Energy Subcommittee on Energy and Power. It was reported (amended) on June 19, 2014, alongside House Report 113-477.

== Debate and discussion ==
US Natural Gas Production

The organization Heritage Action argued in favor of the bill, charging that the "Department of Energy is refusing to move forward on approximately 24 applications to export liquified natural gas (LNG) to non-FTA countries... onerous delays (that) are detrimental to America's international competitiveness." Some of the current applications have been waiting for a determination from the Department of Energy for over 2 years. Heritage Action said that how a member of Congress voted on this bill would be reflected in the organization's scorecard.

The United States Chamber of Commerce supported the bill, arguing that it would "eliminate trade barriers limiting and delaying export of natural gas and bringing more supply of this critical energy source to the world, while spurring additional investment in new domestic production." They cited a study by the U.S. Department of Energy from December 2012 that concluded "the U.S. would experience net economic benefits from increased LNG exports."

The trade organization America's Energy Advantage opposed the bill arguing that "the unlimited and unchecked export of LNG to nations that have yet to sign free trade agreements with the U.S. will undermine the efforts of U.S. trade negotiators to open closed markets to all American goods and services." The organization argued that allowing greater exports of LNG would increase "domestic natural gas and electricity prices for every American."

== See also ==
- List of bills in the 113th United States Congress
- List of countries by natural gas exports
