= Ethan Allen (company) =

American furniture chain

Ethan Allen Interiors Inc.

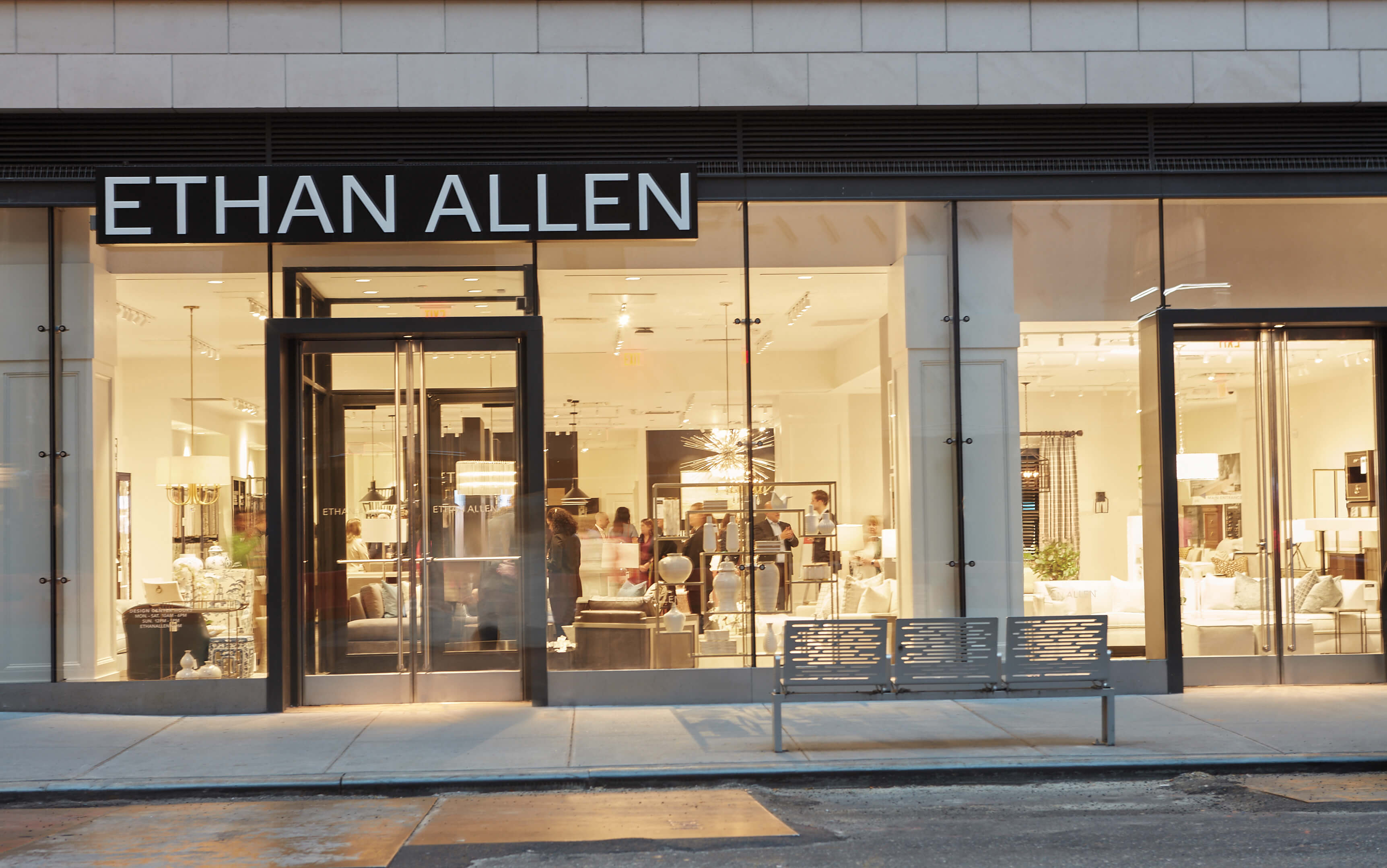
- Storefront on Lexington Ave., New York City
- Type: Public
- Traded as: NYSE: ETD
- Industry: Furniture and home interiors
- Founded: 1932; 94 years ago
- Founders: Nathan S. Ancell; Theodore Baumritter
- Headquarters: Danbury, Connecticut, U.S.
- Key people: Farooq Kathwari (Pres., Chmn., CEO)
- Revenue: ▼US$791.4 million (2023)
- Operating income: ▼US$137.2 million (2023)
- Net income: ▲US$105.8 million (2023)
- Total assets: ▲US$745.5 million (2023)
- Total equity: ▲US$471.0 million (2023)
- Number of employees: 3,748 (June 30, 2023)
- Subsidiaries: Ethan Allen Global, Inc.
- Website: ethanallen.com

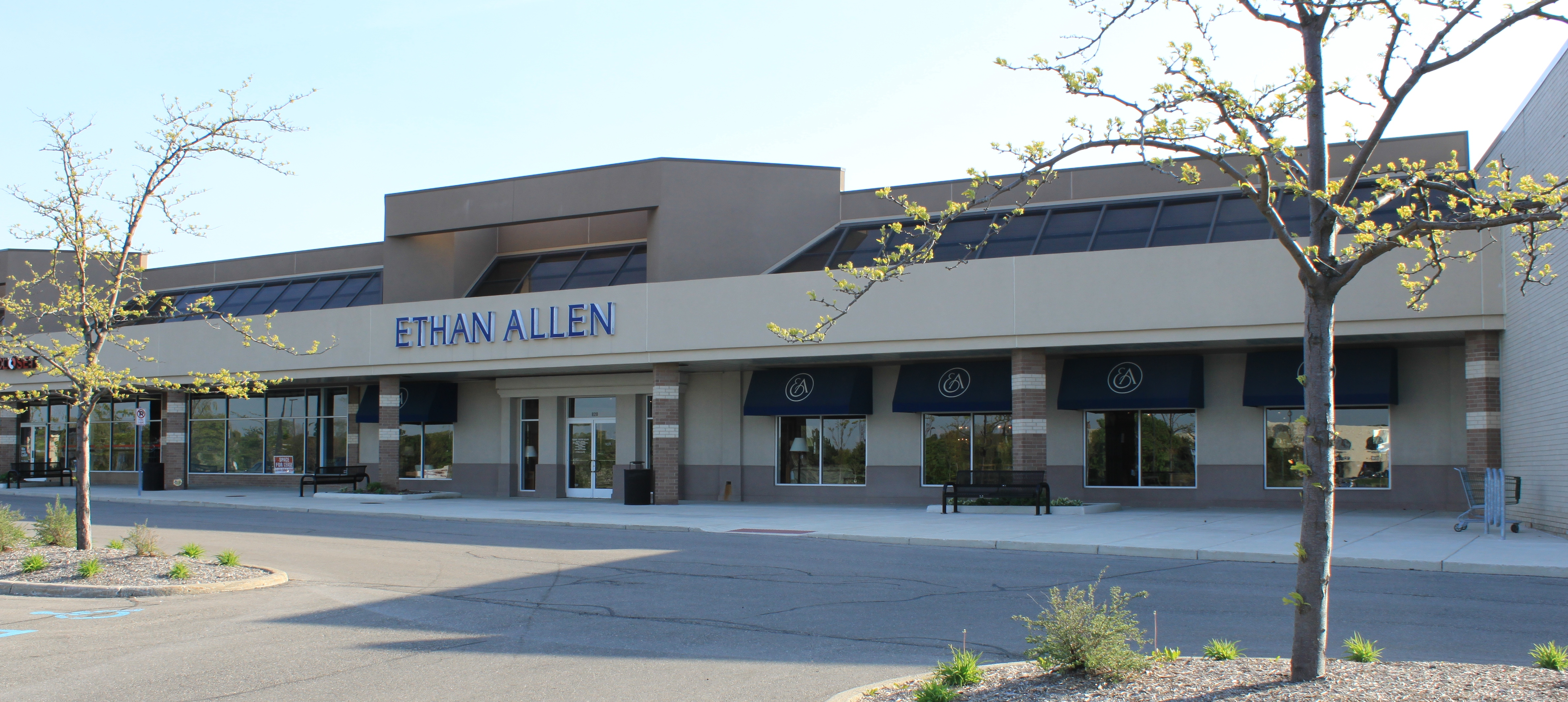
Ethan Allen store, Ann Arbor, Michigan

Ethan Allen Interiors Inc. is an American manufacturer and retailer of home furnishings, incorporated in Delaware with executive offices in Danbury, Connecticut. As of June 30, 2023, the company reported net annual sales of $791.4 million.

== Operations ==
As of June 30, 2023, Ethan Allen operates 139 retail design centers, with 135 located in the United States and four in Canada. Additional design centers are operated by independent licensees located in the U.S., Asia (including the Middle East), and Europe.

The company makes customized furniture domestically (Maiden, North Carolina), such as upholstered furniture, sofas, and chairs, custom made in a selected fabric.

== History ==
=== 20th century ===
The company was founded as a housewares manufacturer in 1932 by Theodore Baumritter and his brother-in-law Nathan S. Ancell. They bought a bankrupt furniture factory in Beecher Falls, Vermont, in 1936 and adopted the name "Ethan Allen" for its early-American furniture introduced in 1939, after the Vermont Revolutionary War leader Ethan Allen.

In 1972, the Baumritter Corporation moved its headquarters from New York City to Danbury, Connecticut. In the late 1970s, the Baumritter Corporation officially changed its name to Ethan Allen. The Ethan Allen International Headquarters Complex includes the Ethan Allen Hotel, corporate headquarters offices, and an interior design center.

The firm was sold in 1980 to Interco for $150 million, with Ancell remaining as an advisor. The company was sold again in 1989 to a management group headed by current chairman, president, and CEO Farooq Kathwari. In 1993, the company went public to help raise $156.9 million through the sale of common stock.

=== 21st century ===
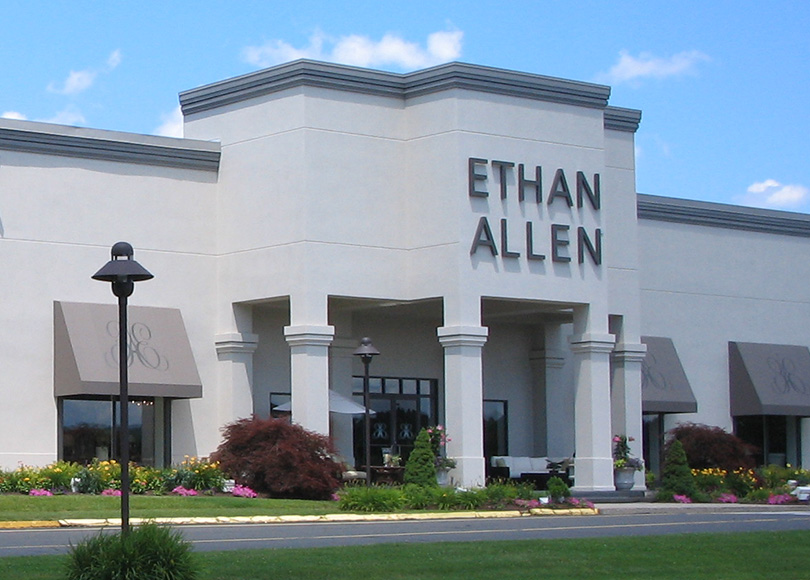
Headquarters and Design Center in Danbury, Connecticut

In 2004, Ethan Allen closed its two plants in Boonville, New York, and Bridgewater, Virginia, laying off 250 each.

In 2008, the company announced plans to close a dozen design centers. The decision was made to consolidate the design centers with others that were currently serving the same market area.

In 2009, the company laid off 238 workers in Beecher Falls, Vermont; 93 workers remained.

In 2021, during the 2021 cryptocurrency boom, the company's stock price increased as investors confused the company's stock with Ethereum, with which it shared the ticker symbol ETH.

Ethan Allen updated its ticker symbol to ETD on August 16, 2021.

In 2022, Ethan Allen completed the purchase of Dimension Wood Products, Inc., which expanded Ethan Allen's manufacturing base in North America. This purchase resulted in the strengthening of Ethan Allen's vertical integration and supply chain.

In August 2026, activist investor Douglas G. Bergeron disclosed a 5% stake in Ethan Allen and nominated himself and five other candidates to the company's board. Bergeron also called for the replacement of chairman and chief executive officer Farooq Kathwari, arguing that the company's leadership and strategy had failed to produce growth and adequately develop its digital business. Ethan Allen confirmed receiving the nominations and said its board would review the proposed candidates before making a recommendation to shareholders.

== In popular culture ==
In the American sitcom, The Big Bang Theory, Ethan Allen is mentioned in Season 7, Episode 18, "The Mommy Observation," when Sheldon refers to their living room couch as "one of Ethan Allen's finest sofas."

== Manufacturing plants ==
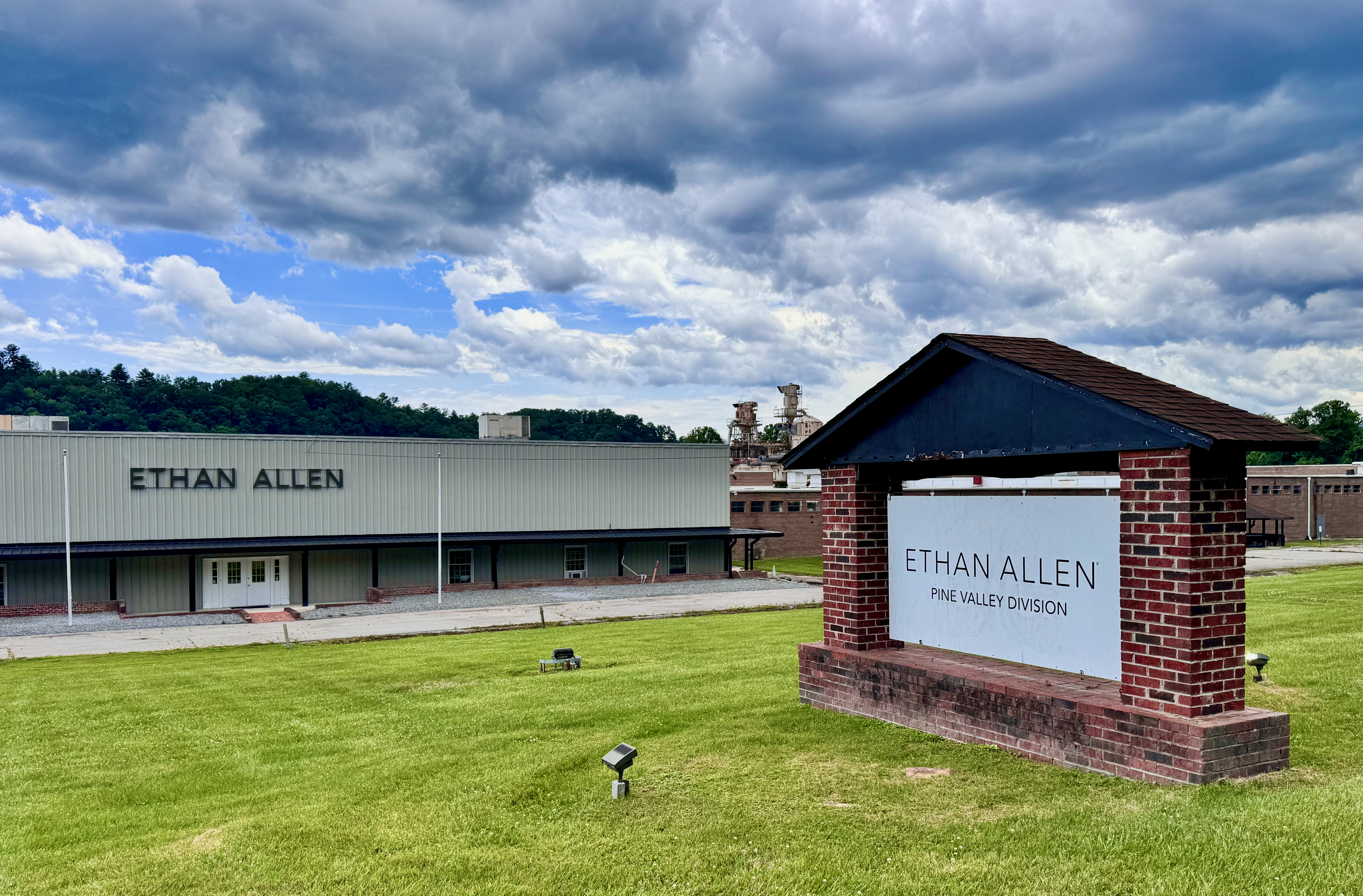
Ethan Allen manufacturing plant in Old Fort, North Carolina

=== Wood Furniture ===
- Beecher Falls, Vermont (sawmill and machining)
- Choloma, Puerto Cortés, Honduras (machining through finishing)
- Old Fort, North Carolina (lumber processing)
- Orleans, Vermont (machining, veneering, and finishing)

=== Upholstery ===
- Claremont, North Carolina (fabric upholstery)
- Silao, Guanajuato, Mexico (fabric and leather upholstery)
