= Western Connecticut State University =

Public university in Danbury, Connecticut, US

- Former name: List: Danbury State Normal School (1903–1937); Danbury Unit of the Teachers College of Connecticut (1933–1937); Danbury State Teachers College (1937–1959); Danbury State College (1959–1967); Western Connecticut State College (1967–1983)
- Type: Public university
- Established: 1903; 123 years ago
- Parent institution: Connecticut State University System
- Endowment: $29 million
- President: Jesse M. Bernal
- Faculty: 223 full-time; 427 part-time; 91% of full-time faculty have doctorates and other approved terminal degrees
- Students: 4,441 (spring 2022)
- Undergraduates: 3,853 (spring 2022)
- Postgraduates: 588 (spring 2022)
- Location: Danbury, Connecticut, U.S. 41°24′03″N 73°26′41″W
- Campus: 398 acres (161 ha) on two campuses; Urban
- Colors: Navy blue & orange
- Nickname: Wolves
- Sporting affiliations: NCAA Division III – Little East, MASCAC
- Website: wcsu.edu

Western Connecticut State University (WCSU or WestConn) is a public university in Danbury, Connecticut, United States. It was founded in 1903 as a teacher's college and is part of the Connecticut State University System.

WCSU consists of four schools: the Ancell School of Business, the Macricostas School of Arts and Sciences, the School of Professional Studies, and the School of Visual and Performing Arts. The university offers 38 bachelor's and one associate degree programs, 15 master's degree programs, and two doctoral programs. WCSU is accredited by the New England Commission of Higher Education (NECHE).

WCSU is home to the Jane Goodall Center for Excellence in Environmental Studies, which is the result of a partnership between WCSU and the Jane Goodall Institute (a private non-profit organization that promotes research, education and wildlife conservation). The university's Westside campus houses the Ives Concert Park, one of the premier performance venues in the area.

Western Connecticut State University is part of the Little East Conference and Massachusetts State Collegiate Athletic Conference in NCAA Division III. WCSU has 14 varsity sports.

Students from New York and New Jersey residents pay in-state tuition; students from New England pay reduced rates because of WCSU's participation in the New England Board of Higher Education's Regional Student Program.

== History ==
=== Founding and growth ===
Western Connecticut State University was established in 1903, as the "Danbury State Normal School", per an act by the Connecticut General Assembly. The school was founded as a normal school, designed to train school teachers, the fourth such school in Connecticut. Its initial campus was located on a tract of land totaling 3 acres (1.2 ha) along White Street, donated by Alexander M. White. Classes began the following year, with an initial enrollment of 41 students. The costs of tuition and textbooks were covered by the state, although boarding costs were not. The school's first graduation was held in 1906. Within several years, the school began holding "demonstration sessions" at "model schools" located on its campus. The number of enrollments climbed to 362 students by 1912.

The school changed its name twice in the 1930s: it became the "Danbury Unit of the Teachers College of Connecticut" in 1933 and then the "Danbury State Teachers College" in 1937.

The college was renamed "Danbury State College" in 1959, alongside the establishment of a four-year liberal arts degree program.

The school was renamed to "Western Connecticut State College" in 1967. In 1974, groundbreaking began on construction work for the college's Westside Campus. In 1979, the state withdrew funding for construction of the campus, leading to student protests. The Westside Campus' classroom building opened in 1982.

The school was finally renamed to "Western Connecticut State University" in 1983. In 2011, governance of the university was transferred to the Connecticut State Colleges & Universities system.

=== WXCI ===
In 1952, an extracurricular radio program called The Radio Workshop was organized, going by the call sign WDTC.

In 1968, WCSU's radio station, WXCI (91.7 FM), then going by the call sign WCST and broadcasting with AM transmission, was established.

In 1973 WCST was switched from AM to FM transmission, obtained an FCC license for FM transmission, was renamed WXCI, and went on air under that call sign.

In the early 1980s, WXCI became one of the first FM stations to focus on alternative rock. Throughout the 80s the station was instrumental in promoting the work of a number of contemporary bands and musicians. While the station is perhaps best known for popularizing the English band Duran Duran in the United States, it also helped to familiarize the American audience with other projects and musicians from Great Britain, such as Elvis Costello and Culture Club. It popularized among residents of the Northeastern U.S. the West Coast punk group Black Flag and the Georgia-based R.E.M., while also providing greater listenership to New York City's Talking Heads. Thurston Moore, a founding member of Sonic Youth, attended WCSU for a quarter during the fall of 1976, though he left afterward.

=== Jane Goodall Institute and environmental projects ===
In 1995, the Jane Goodall Center for Excellence in Environmental Studies (JGC) was founded on campus. The center is a non-profit 501(c)(3) organization dedicated to environmental stewardship and conservation, and wildlife education and research, being the result of a partnership between Western and the Jane Goodall Institute (JGI). Since the center's founding, its namesake, primatologist Dr. Jane Goodall, has visited Western on at least a dozen occasions to give lectures on the issue of ecology.

The center has also hosted a number of seminars and public talks by other environmentalist speakers at the university: Notably, Smithsonian ethnobotanist Mark Plotkin and veteran ecologist Thomas Lovejoy spoke at the university in 1998, and in 2013 ocean conservationist Fabien Cousteau presented a public seminar on campus.

In 2005, Western was established by JGI as a "National Center for University Roots and Shoots"; this resulted in the institution of the eponymous student environmental club, a chapter of the international Roots & Shoots (also known as Jane Goodall's Roots & Shoots), on campus. Roots & Shoots is a subsidiary organization of JGI, and its WCSU chapter is one of only several based in the United States. The club's office, located in the Midtown campus's White Hall, remained the first of its kind between 2005 and 2012; afterwards, the organization's international headquarters was established at JGI's head office in Washington, D.C.

Roots & Shoots serves as, according to the university and the JGC, "a regional and national office of excellence in training university students, faculty and administrators to develop programs for K–12 and college students in local, regional and global conservation."

=== Significant visitors and lectures ===
The university was visited by former President Bill Clinton in 2005 and by the 14th Dalai Lama in 2012.

== Structure ==
=== Schools ===
- Ancell School of Business
- Macricostas School of Arts and Sciences
- School of Visual and Performing Arts
- School of Professional Studies
- Division of Graduate Studies

=== Campus ===
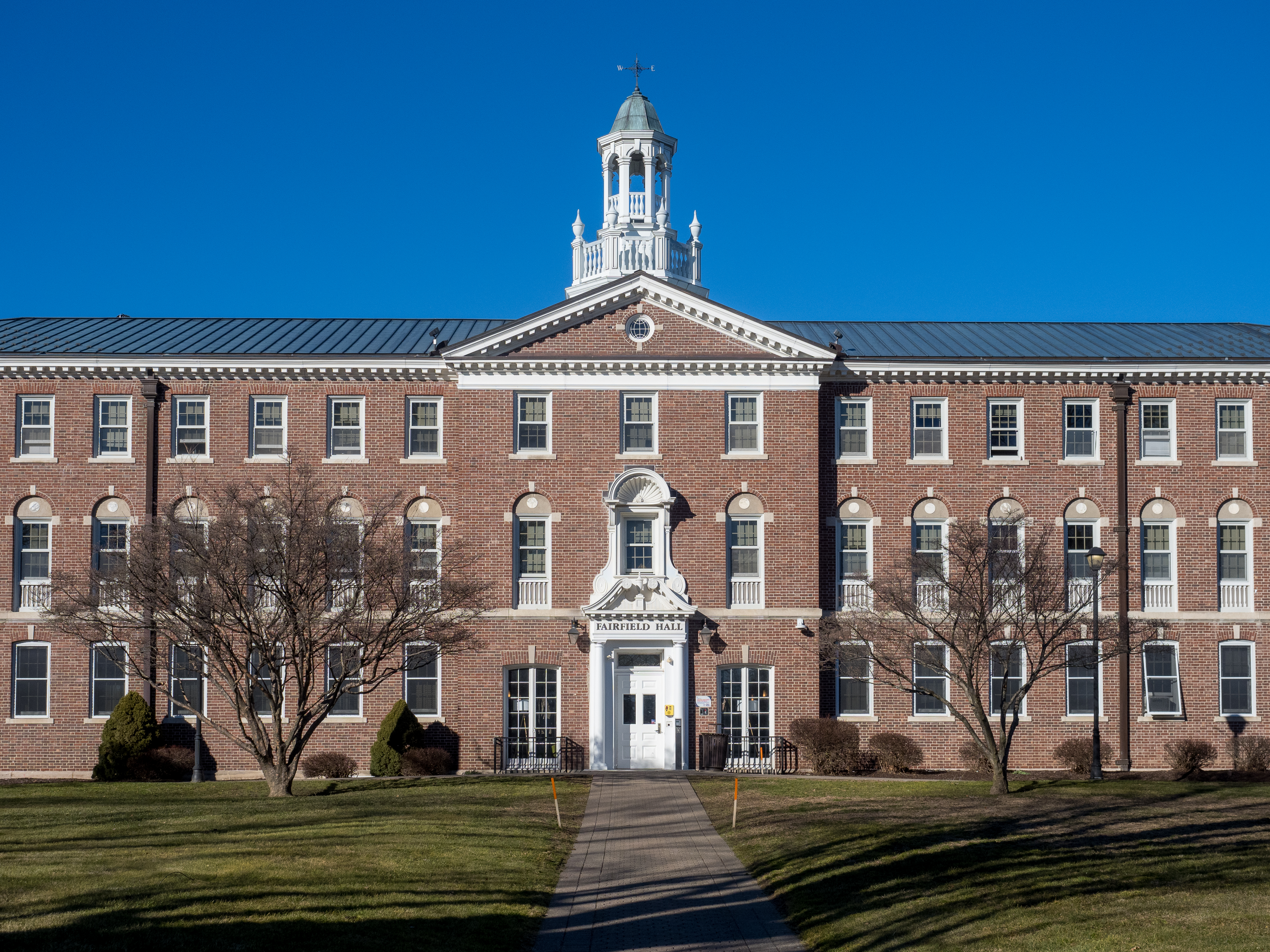
Fairfield Hall

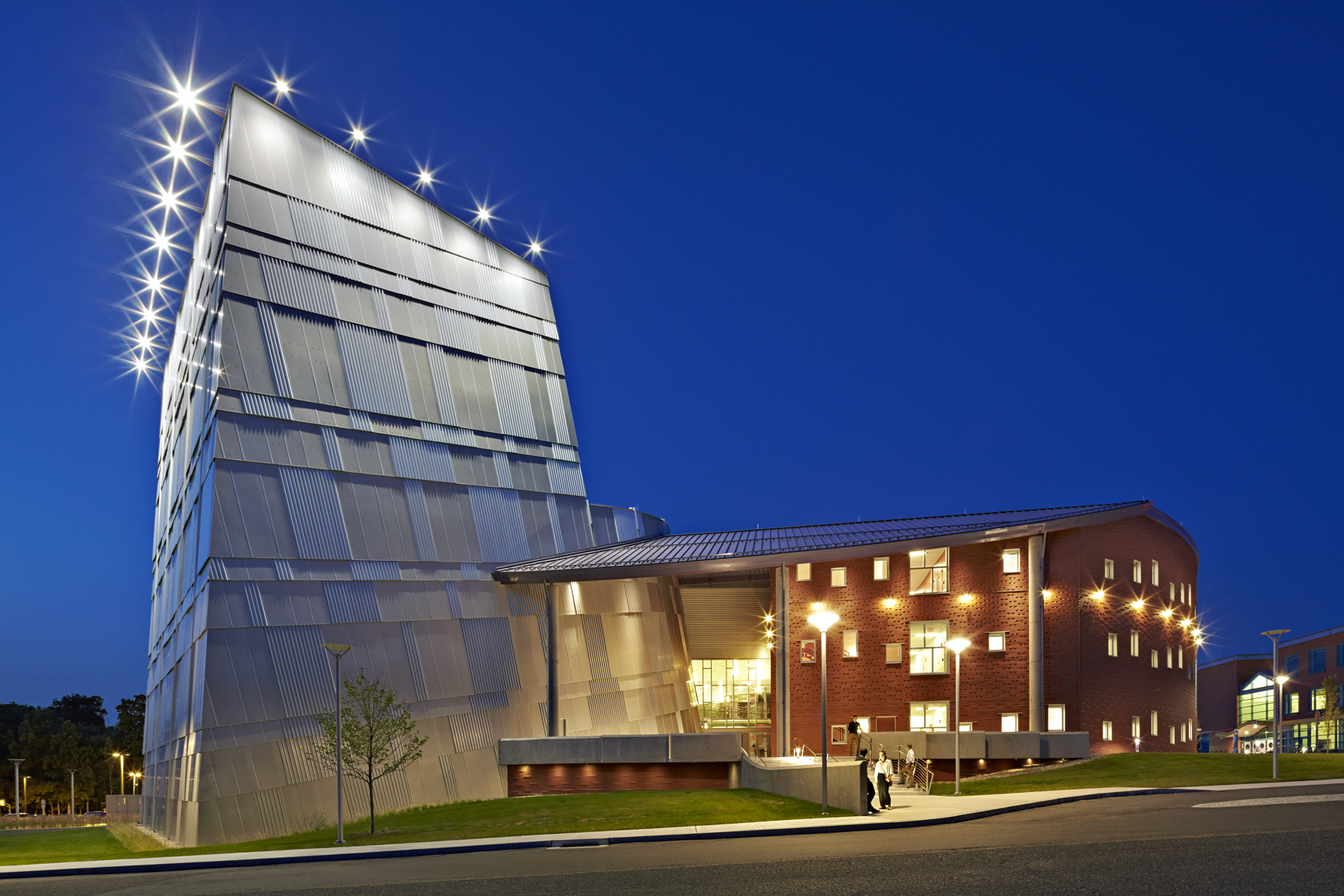
School of Visual and Performing Arts

WCSU has two campuses, Midtown and Westside, both located in Danbury. The campuses are three miles (5 kilometres (3.1 mi) apart and connected by a university shuttle service.

The Midtown Campus is the original campus, located on White Street near downtown Danbury and the Main Street Historic District. It is home to the Macricostas School of Arts and Sciences, School of Professional Studies, and most of the university's administration. Dormitories on this campus include Fairfield Hall, Litchfield Hall, and Newbury Hall. The Midtown student center is located on this campus. In 2018, the fully renovated Higgins Hall reopened. Higgins Hall features the MSAS Dean's offices.

The Westside Campus is located on land purchased in 1969 on the outskirts of Danbury. This 439-acre (1.78 km^{2}) lot is home to the Ancell School of Business, the School of Visual and Performing Arts, the Westside Nature Preserve, an amphitheater and three residence halls. Westside also houses athletic facilities, including the William O'Neill Athletic and Convocation Center (completed in 1995), and the Westside Athletic Complex (completed in 2003), as well as an observatory with a 20-inch Ritchy-Chretien telescope and a 20-foot planetarium dome. On January 23, 2007, the Westside Campus Center was officially opened. This new facility serves as a student center, meeting and banquet facility for the Westside Campus. In August 2014, the Westside Campus saw the opening of the new Visual and Performing Arts Center, a comprehensive arts building with Theatre Arts, Music and Visual Arts wings.

A major improvement program was started in the mid-1990s to beautify the campus. Several parking lots became green space, and improvements were made to the landscaping.

In April 2013, startup of a newly installed fuel cell power unit for the Science Building on the university's Midtown Campus began. The PureCell System, provided by ClearEdge Power, supports the university to reap significant energy cost savings and enhanced electricity and heating efficiencies.

The Midtown Campus Science Building was the first state-funded building project to seek LEED Silver certification from the U.S. Green Building Council. The Visual and Performing Arts Center as well as Centennial Hall also obtained LEED certification. In 2014, WCSU installed four EV (electric vehicle) charging stations, two on each campus. These charging stations are available to both students and the public, free of charge. The university is a participant in EV Connecticut Electric Vehicle Charging Solutions program.

The "WestConn at Waterbury" program is located on the campus of Naugatuck Valley Community College in Waterbury, Connecticut. The program offers completion courses for a Bachelor of Business Administration (BBA) in management or a Bachelor of Science in Nursing (BSN), as well as a Master of Health Administration (M.H.A.).

== Buildings ==
=== Midtown Campus ===
- University Hall (Administrative Offices)
- White Hall (Classrooms & Faculty Offices)
- Warner Hall (Classrooms & Faculty Offices)
- Ruth A. Haas Library
- Berkshire Hall (Classrooms, Gymnasium, Wellness Center & Faculty Offices)
- Science Building (Classrooms, Laboratories, PureCell fuel cell & Faculty Offices)
- Old Main (Registrar, Fin. Aid, Cashier & Offices)
- Higgins Hall (Classrooms, Dean, & Faculty Offices)
- Fairfield Hall (Residence Hall)
- Newbury Hall (Residence Hall)
- Litchfield Hall (Residence Hall)
- Student Center
- Brayvion Hall (Welfare Center)
- Alumni Hall (Child Care)
- Kathwari Honors House

=== Westside Campus ===
- Classroom Building (Classrooms, Robert Young Library & Faculty Offices)
- Campus Center (Student Center & Multi-use facility)
- Visual and Performing Arts Center (Houses School of Visual and Performing Arts)
- O'Neill Center (Feldman Arena, Sports Facilities)
- Football Stadium (Westside Athletic Center)
- Rugby Field
- Football Practice Field
- Softball Field
- Baseball Stadium
- Tennis Facilities
- Pinney Hall (Residence Hall)
- Centennial Hall (Residence Hall)
- Grasso Hall (Residence Hall)
- Observatory
- Ives Concert Park

== Student body ==
Undergraduate demographics as of fall 2023
Race and ethnicity	Total
White	50%
Hispanic	29%
Black	9%
Asian	5%
Two or more races	5%
Unknown	1%
Economic diversity
Low-income (Note: The percentage of students who received an income-based federal Pell grant intended for low-income students.)	35%
Affluent (Note: The percentage of students who are a part of the American middle class at the bare minimum.)	65%

As of Fall 2020, WCSU has an enrollment of 3,849 full-time and 791 part-time undergraduate students and 68 full-time and 538 part-time graduate students.

Most WCSU students come from the tri-state area comprising Connecticut, New York, and New Jersey. Nearly all commuter students come from western Connecticut and Putnam, Dutchess, and Westchester counties in New York.

According to the university, students claiming Connecticut residency come from 99 of the state's 169 municipalities.

Women comprise 51.2% of the entering class, and members of historically underrepresented racial and ethnic groups comprise 44.2% of the entering class.

The student-to-faculty ratio as of Fall 2020 is 12 to 1 (total student FTE divided by total faculty FTE).

== Student life ==
Western Connecticut State University currently has over 75 student clubs and organizations.

In 2008, the Western Marketing Association was renamed to the Marketing Club.

The Roger Sherman Debate Society participates in policy debate tournaments sanctioned by the Cross Examination Debate Association. The team competes in the North East Conference as well as the national circuit. WCSU is the only university in Connecticut that offers a policy debate team.

== Resources ==
Academic resources for students include the Academic Advisement Center, Academic Testing Center, Career Success Center, First Year Program, Student Technology Training Center, Libraries and various tutoring centers.

Resources for faculty include the Office of Sponsored Research and Administrative Services, Instructional Technology Services, Academic Planning Calendar and the Faculty Development & Research Funds.

== Communications ==
=== Radio station ===
The college's radio station, WXCI, broadcasts at 91.7 FM to Connecticut and New York at 3,000 watts. It also streams its broadcasts on the internet. WXCI's radio transmitter is located on the westside campus, while its studio is in the main campus (Midtown) student center.

=== Student newspaper ===
The Echo is the university's student newspaper, founded in 1955, and subsidized by the students' activity fees. It has an editorial board which makes strategic and operational decisions on behalf of the newspaper. The Echo is published weekly in tabloid format, though in the past it has been published in broadsheet format. The Echo launched a new website, echo.wcsu.edu, in 2012.

== Athletics ==
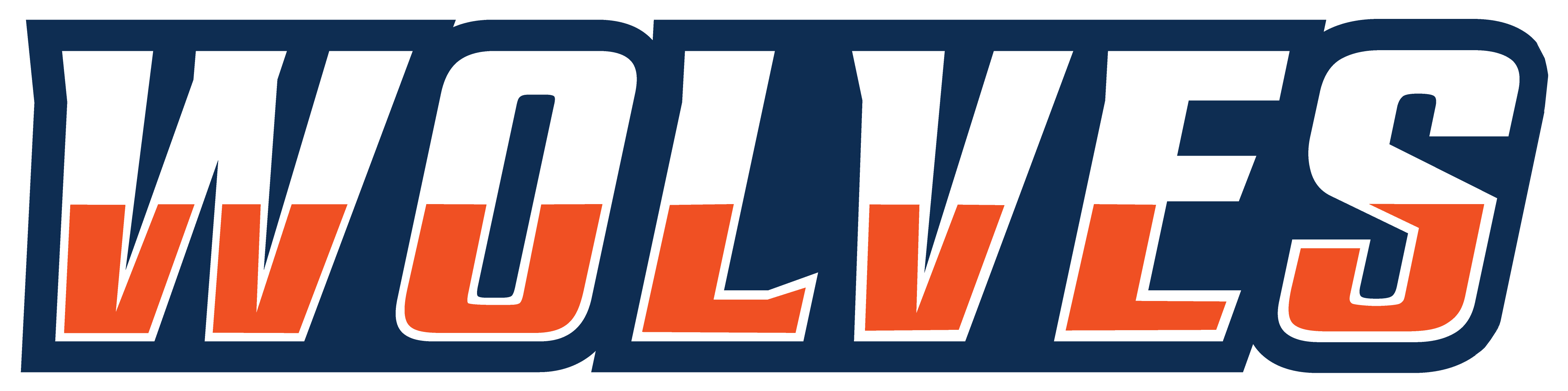
WCSU athletics wordmark

Western Connecticut State University teams (nicknamed the Wolves) compete at the NCAA Division III level, with the football team also competing in the Massachusetts State Collegiate Athletic Conference (MASCAC), and is a member of the Eastern College Athletic Conference (ECAC) and the Little East Conference (LEC). The university offers intercollegiate competition in 19 sports: men's baseball, basketball, cross country, football, golf, track & field, lacrosse, soccer, tennis, and swimming and diving; and women's basketball, cross country, field hockey, lacrosse, soccer, softball, swimming and diving, tennis and volleyball.

Through the athletic training staff and university physician, WCSU provides health care to student athletes participating in intercollegiate sports.

WCSU offers competition at the club level in six sports: cheerleading, dance team, ice hockey, men's rugby, track & field, ultimate frisbee and powerlifting. The university also offers a variety of intramural activities depending on the semester as well as group exercise classes, a fitness zone and access to the O’Neill Center pool.

=== Sports venues ===
Varsity

- Field hockey: Westside Athletic Complex
- Baseball: Athletic fields baseball stadium
- Basketball: Feldman Arena at the O'Neill Center
- Cross-country: Ives Concert Park and Westside Nature Preserve
- Track & field: Westside Athletic Complex
- Football: Westside Athletic Complex (a.k.a. WAC), football stadium
- Lacrosse: Westside Athletic Complex
- Women's lacrosse: Westside Athletic Complex
- Soccer: Westside Athletic Complex
- Softball: Athletic fields softball field
- Swimming: O'Neill Center
- Tennis: O'Neil Center outdoor tennis courts
- Volleyball: Feldman Arena at the O'Neill Center
- Golf
- Hockey: Danbury Ice Arena

Non-varsity

- Rugby: athletic practice fields

== Mascot ==
The original Western Connecticut State mascot was an Indian. A mascot committee formed to find a less offensive name in 1974 recommended changing the mascot to the Colonials, "a name that our teams can carry with respect...". The official mascot became Chuck the Colonial, a man in a blue Tricorne hat. Following the murder of George Floyd and pressure from alumni and students in June 2020, the university announced the formation of a committee to determine the fate of the mascot and the Colonials nickname and decided to no longer use these. On April 19, 2022, the university announced that they would be changing their mascot name to the Wolves.

== Notable people ==
=== Alumni ===
- Gorman Bechard, film director and screenwriter
- Evan R. Bernstein, community activist
- Mark D. Boughton, mayor of Danbury, Connecticut
- David Cappiello, former Connecticut state senator and businessman
- Jane K. Cleland, mystery author
- Christine Cohen, Connecticut state senator
- Dirt E. Dutch (Eric Bassriel), producer, hip-hop artist, and host for IndieFeed
- James E. Dyer, Connecticut state representative (d. 2011)
- Fidelma Healy Eames, Irish politician
- Markus Gottschlich, Austrian jazz pianist
- EJ Harrison, professional basketball player
- Adam Lanza, perpetrator of the Sandy Hook Elementary School shooting
- Paul LaPolice, coach of the Winnipeg Blue Bombers
- Dan L. Miller, Pennsylvania state representative
- Thurston Moore (attended, but did not graduate), musician, Sonic Youth
- Joe Moravsky, athlete and meteorologist
- Merv Mosely, American football player
- Fred Norris, radio personality and writer for The Howard Stern Show
- Corey Paris, Connecticut state representative
- Paul L. Pasqualoni, defensive line coach for the Chicago Bears
- Lawrence Michael "Mike" Porzio, former Major League Baseball pitcher
- Jodi Rell (attended, but did not graduate), governor of Connecticut (2004–11)
- Chris Rhodes, trombone player and member of the Mighty Mighty Bosstones
- Dana Sawyer, professor of religion and philosophy and writer on religious studies and spirituality
- David Wilson, Connecticut state representative
- Mr. Scott Wright, professional wrestler and bodybuilder

=== Faculty ===
- Patricia E. Cladis (d. 2017), Chinese-born Canadian American physicist and researcher, specialist in liquid crystal physics
  - Assistant professor of physics (taught 1963–1964)
- Jimmy Greene, jazz saxophonist, gospel musician, producer
  - Assistant professor of music (teaching 2012–present)
  - Coordinator of jazz studies
- Mary Ann Lamb, Broadway theatre performer
  - Adjunct instructor of musical theatre
- Elizabeth Parkinson, Broadway theatre performer
  - Adjunct instructor of musical theatre
- Sal Salvador (d. 1999), bebop and jazz guitarist, music educator and instructor
- Deborah Weisz, jazz composer, trombonist, and musician; performer alongside Frank Sinatra 1987–1994
  - Adjunct instructor of music
- Scott Wise, Broadway theatre performer, Tony Award winner
  - Adjunct instructor of musical theatre

== Meteorology program/Weather Center ==
WCSU has the only bachelor's degree program in meteorology in southern New England. It is part of the Department of Physics, Astronomy, and Meteorology. The program prepares students for graduate studies in meteorology and earth sciences and provides the necessary coursework for employment with the National Weather Service. It also contains an option in broadcast meteorology. The Science Building on the Midtown campus houses the Meteorological Studies and Weather Center (MSWC), which provides forecasting services for industrial and media clients, and conducts forensic climatological and meteorological studies. The MSWC also contains a TV studio, forecast center, and research area, supporting the meteorology program.

== Astronomical facilities ==
WCSU houses two observatories, one public and one for undergraduate and graduate students and faculty. The Midtown observatory is located on the top of the Science Building. It is used for both students and on public viewing nights. The telescope has a 6-inch (150 mm) refractor and an 8-inch (200 mm) Schmidt-Cassegrain telescope. There is also a planetarium for teaching and public star shows.

The West Side campus houses a large-format thermoelectrically cooled CCD camera and is specifically used for astrophysical studies.

== Library archive collections ==
The Archives and Special Collections Library at WCSU is the archival repository for the historical records of the university and is a significant repository for collections relating to the history of the Danbury and greater western Connecticut area.

The mission of the Archives is to collect and make accessible the WCSU administrative records, faculty papers, university publications, theses, visual materials, and other media created by the university. It also includes non-WCSU affiliated personal papers, local government and organizational records, visual materials, maps, journals and other media that document the history of this region. The WCSU Archives also administers CT's Archives Online which searches archival materials around the state. WCSU's archival holdings amount to approximately 1800 linear feet.
