= Mirta Núñez =

Cuban-Spanish historian

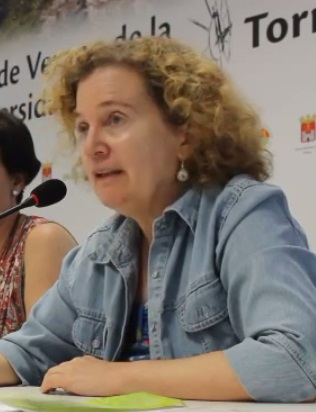
- Mirta Núñez in 2014
- Born: Mirta Núñez Díaz-Balart
- Parent(s): Emilio Núñez Blanco and Mirta Díaz-Balart
- Relatives: Rafael José Díaz-Balart (maternal grandfather); Emilio Núñez Portuondo (paternal grandfather); Fidel Castro Díaz-Balart (half-brother); Waldo Díaz-Balart (maternal uncle); Rafael Díaz-Balart (maternal uncle); Lincoln Díaz-Balart (first cousin) Mario Díaz-Balart (first cousin); José Díaz-Balart (first cousin)

Academic background
- Education: Complutense University of Madrid
- Thesis: The war press in the republican zone during the Spanish Civil War (1988)
- Doctoral advisor: José Altabella Hernández

Academic work
- Institutions: Complutense University of Madrid

Mirta Núñez Díaz-Balart is a Cuban-Spanish historian.

== Life ==
Mirta Núñez Díaz-Balart was born into a family marked by history: her father, the lawyer Emilio Núñez Blanco was a notorious anti-Castro activist; her mother, Mirta Díaz-Balart, was the first wife of Fidel Castro. Mirta Núñez was at the same time the half-sister of the only "official" son of the Cuban president, Fidel Castro Díaz-Balart (1949-2018), and the first cousin of two U.S. Republican congressmen, Lincoln Díaz-Balart, and Mario Díaz-Balart.

Mirta Núñez graduated from Complutense University of Madrid in 1983, with the thesis "The Press of the International Brigades". In October 1988, she read her doctoral thesis, entitled "The war press in the republican zone during the Spanish Civil War (1936-1939)", directed by José Altabella Hernández. The thesis, in 2683 pages across six volumes, was published four years later. She wrote histories of the Spanish Civil War.

Mirta Núñez is a tenured professor at Complutense University of Madrid.

== Works ==
- La disciplina de la conciencia: las Brigadas Internacionales, Barcelona, Flor del Viento, 2006, ISBN 978-84-96495-12-8
- Mujeres caídas: prostitutas legales y clandestinas en el franquismo, prólogo de Rafael Torres, Madrid, Oberon, 2003. ISBN 84-96052-23-0
- Los años del terror; la estrategia de dominio y represión del general Franco, Madrid, La Esfera de los Libros, 2004. ISBN 84-9734-179-1
- La prensa de guerra en la zona republicana durante la Guerra Civil española (1936-1939), Madrid, La Torre, 1992, 3 v. ISBN 84-7960-038-1.
- Javier Bueno, un periodista comprometido con la revolución, Madrid, Fundación Banco Exterior, 1987, ISBN 84-7434-162-0
