= Díaz-Balart family =

Cuban-American political family

The Díaz-Balart family is a Cuban-American political family primarily composed of the descendants of Cuban politician Rafael Díaz-Balart, and including two members of the United States Congress. The family came to the United States in January 1959, having been in Paris when Fidel Castro overthrew the Cuban government the previous month. In 2003, the family was voted "Best Power Family" in the annual Miami New Times "BEST OF MIAMI" issue, which asserted that the family managed to "carve out a new U.S. Congressional district expressly for an ambitious family member", and also claimed that the father and grandfather of the U.S. politicians "were important members of the ruling oligarchy during the fearsome reign of Fulgencio Batista".

== Members ==
Members of the family include:

- Rafael José Díaz-Balart (c. 1899 – 1985), Cuban politician and mayor of the town of Banes; with his wife América Gutiérrez, he had three sons and a daughter:
  - Rafael Lincoln Díaz-Balart (January 17, 1926 – May 6, 2005), Cuban politician; with his wife, Hilda Caballero Brunet, Díaz-Balart had four sons:
    - Rafael J. Díaz-Balart (born 1951), banker.
    - Lincoln Díaz-Balart (August 13, 1954 – March 3, 2025), U.S. Representative; with his wife, Cristina Fernandez, he has two sons:
      - Lincoln Díaz-Balart Jr. (1983/84 – May 19, 2013)
      - Daniel Díaz-Balart
    - José Díaz-Balart (born November 7, 1960), television news anchor; with his wife, Brenda, he has two daughters:
      - Katrina Díaz-Balart
      - Sabrina Díaz-Balart
    - Mario Díaz-Balart (born September 25, 1961), U.S. Representative; with his wife, Tia Díaz-Balart, he has one son:
      - Cristian Díaz-Balart
  - Mirta Díaz-Balart (September 30, 1928 – July 6, 2024), sister of Rafael, Waldo, and Frank, was the first wife of Cuban leader Fidel Castro; they had one son and then divorced prior to the Cuban Revolution; she then remarried, to Emilio Núñez Blanco, with whom she had two daughters:
    With Fidel Castro:
    - Fidel Castro Díaz-Balart ("Fidelito"; September 1, 1949 – February 1, 2018), Cuban physicist; Fidel Castro's first-born son. With his former wife Natasha Smirnova, he had three children:
      - Mirta María Castro-Smirnova (born 1984), lives in Spain, and teaches applied mathematics at the University of Seville;
      - Fidel Antonio Castro-Smirnov (born 1980), became a specialist in biochemistry and molecular biology.
      - José Raúl Castro-Smirnov (born 1985), studied nanotechnology at the University of Barcelona, graduated from the Higher Institute of Technologies and Applied Sciences in Havana, and University of Seville with a physicist's diploma.
    With Emilio Núñez Blanco:
    - Mirta Núñez Díaz-Balart, a Cuban-Spanish historian.
    - América Silvia Núñez Díaz-Balart.
  - Waldo Díaz-Balart (February 10, 1931 – February 5, 2025), brother of Rafael, Frank, and Mirta, Cuban American painter.
  - Frank Rafael Díaz-Balart (1927-2017), brother of Rafael, Waldo and Mirta, Cuban American engineer.
