= Fidel Castro Díaz-Balart =

Cuban nuclear physicist and government official (1949–2018)

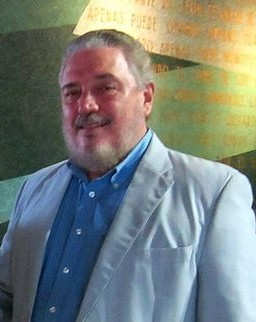
- Castro in 2014
- Born: Fidel Ángel Castro Díaz-Balart; 1 September 1949; Havana, Republic of Cuba
- Died: 1 February 2018 (aged 68); Havana, Cuba
- Cause of death: Suicide
- Education: Moscow State University
- Occupation: Nuclear physicist
- Spouse(s): Natasha Smirnova (divorced) María Victoria Barreiro
- Children: 3
- Parents: Fidel Castro (father); Mirta Díaz-Balart (mother)
- Relatives: Mirta Núñez (half-sister); Ángel Castro y Argiz (grandfather); Rafael José Díaz-Balart (grandfather); Ramón Castro (uncle); Raúl Castro (uncle); Juanita Castro (aunt); Rafael Díaz-Balart (uncle); Waldo Díaz-Balart (uncle); Alina Fernández Revuelta (Half sister); Mariela Castro (cousin); Alejandro Castro Espín (cousin); Mario Díaz-Balart (cousin); Lincoln Díaz-Balart (cousin); José Díaz-Balart (cousin)

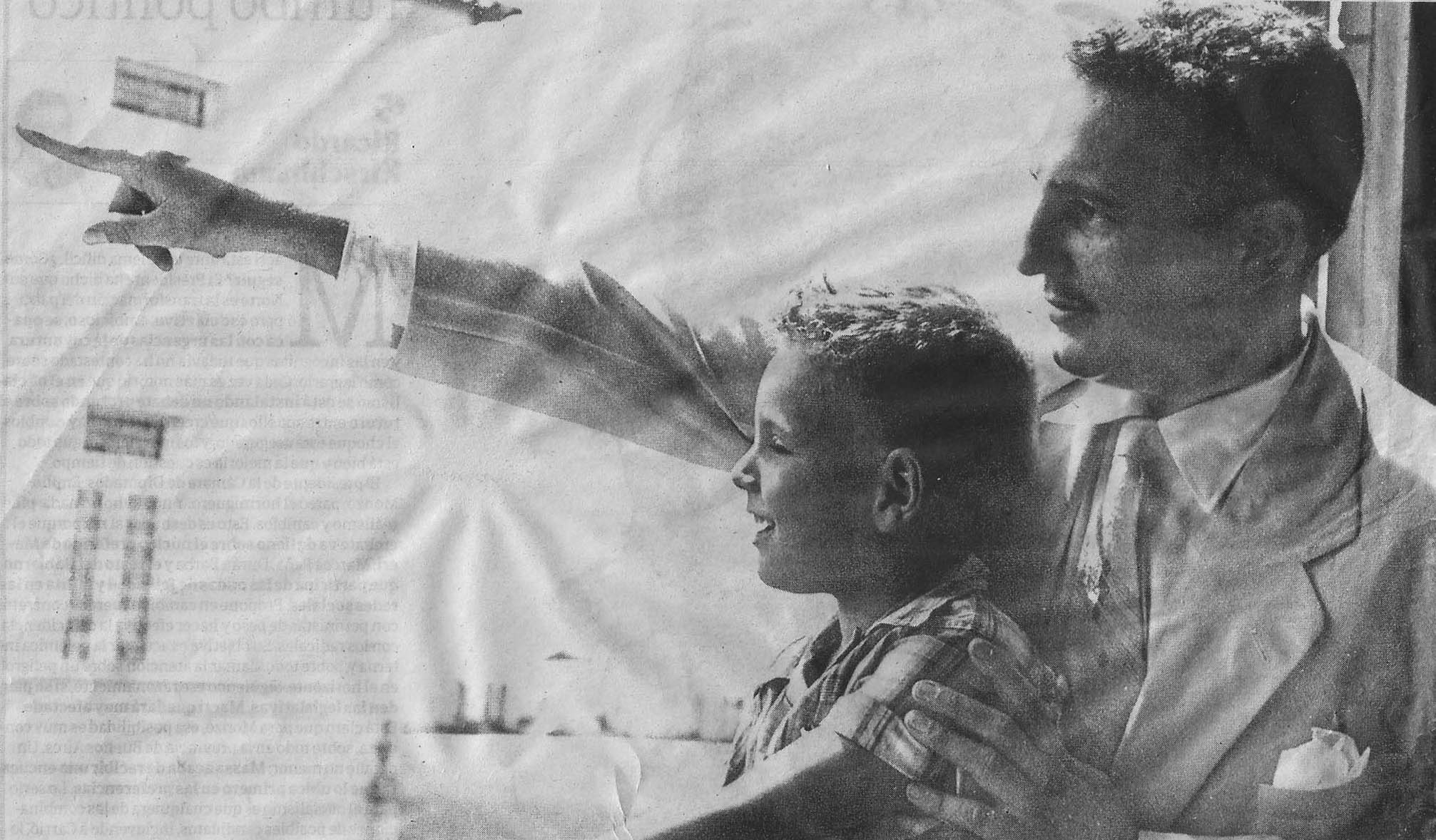
Fidelito with his imprisoned father, 1954

Fidel Ángel Castro Díaz-Balart (1 September 1949 – 1 February 2018) was a Cuban nuclear physicist and government official. Frequently known by the diminutive Fidelito ('Little Fidel'), he was the eldest son of Cuban leader Fidel Castro and his first wife, Mirta Díaz-Balart.

== Life and career ==
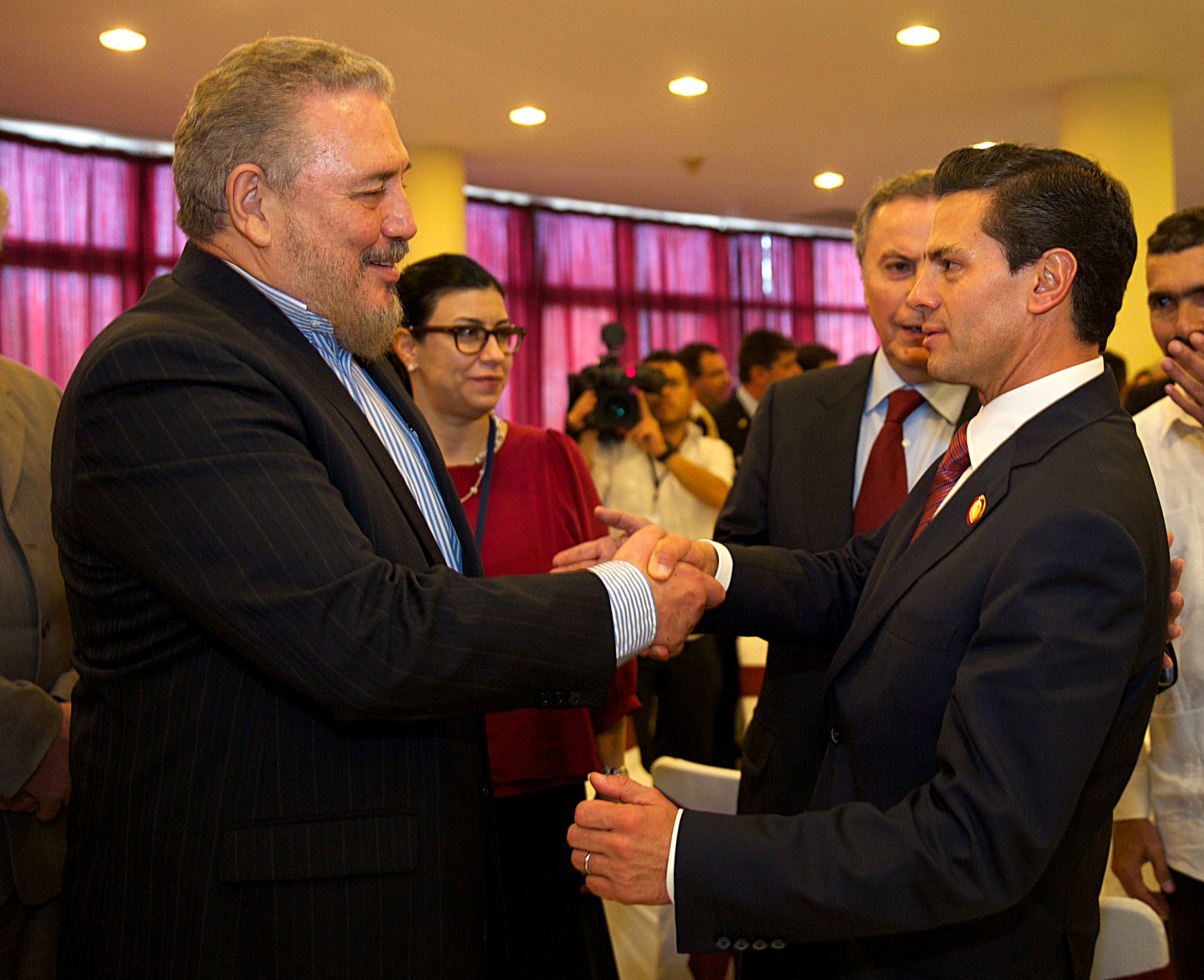
Castro Díaz-Balart (left) with President of Mexico Enrique Peña Nieto, 28 January 2014, 2nd CELAC Summit, Havana.

Castro Díaz-Balart's parents divorced in 1955, prior to the Cuban Revolution in which his father seized power in the country. His mother moved to Miami, United States, with the Díaz-Balart family, taking her son with her. Castro Díaz-Balart returned to Cuba as a child to visit his father, and remained there for the rest of his childhood. In 1959, he appeared as a 9-year-old during an interview with his father on U.S. television.

Castro Díaz-Balart moved to Moscow (in what was then the Soviet Union), where he enrolled at Voronezh State University in 1968. For safety, he studied under the code name "José Raúl Fernández", which he claimed to have chosen in homage to world chess champion José Raúl Capablanca and to have later used to publish 30 scientific publications. He initially studied physical education before switching to nuclear physics in 1970. He graduated from Lomonosov Moscow State University, and went on to work at the Joint Institute for Nuclear Research in Dubna, and to receive his first doctorate from Lomonosov, in 1978. Returning to Cuba, he was placed in charge of Cuba's nuclear power program for a time, leading the Juragua Nuclear Power Plant construction program from 1980 to 1992, during which time he was also the executive secretary of the country's Atomic Energy Commission. He served as a member of the Non-aligned Movement's Coordinating Countries for the Peaceful Use of Nuclear Energy, and was elected to chair the Second Meeting of that group in April 1983. Castro Díaz-Balart was removed from his positions in June 1992, following a falling out with his father, who cited "inefficiency" as the reason for the removal. Another reason for his removal is attributed to his failure to develop an atomic bomb for Cuba's military. Castro then announced the suspension of construction at Juragua in September 1992, due to Cuba's inability to meet the financial terms set by Russia to complete the reactors.

Castro Díaz-Balart then returned to further his studies in Moscow, and received his second doctorate at the Kurchatov Institute of Atomic Energy in 1999. In the 2010s, he returned to a level of prominence, serving as a scientific advisor to the Council of State, the governing body of Cuba, and as vice-president of the Academy of Sciences of Cuba. Throughout his career, Castro Diaz-Balart authored articles on the developing role of nuclear energy.

In 2012, Castro Díaz-Balart disputed reports that Fidel Castro was becoming senile, describing his father as "lucid" and "working hard", which was similar to the "upbeat assessment" of Castro's health that Castro Díaz-Balart made in February 2007, following Castro's illness during that period.

In April 2014, he visited Russia to declare Cuba's recognition of the annexation of Crimea by the Russian Federation, also receiving an honorary doctorate at Voronezh State University. In February 2015, during the Cuban thaw towards the end of the Obama administration, when Americans were more freely allowed to visit Cuba, he participated in events to welcome American celebrities to the island, mingling with Paris Hilton and Naomi Campbell. The following month, he visited Novosibirsk, Russia, meeting with the mayor, Anatoly Lokot, and regional governor Vladimir Gorodetsky to improve Cuban relations with scientific institutions in the region.

== Family ==
Castro Díaz-Balart had three children – Mirta María, Fidel Antonio, and José Raúl – with Natasha Smirnova, whom he met in Russia. After divorcing Smirnova, he married María Victoria Barreiro from Cuba. U.S. Congressman Mario Díaz-Balart, who represents the 25th district of Florida, and former U.S. Congressman Lincoln Díaz-Balart were his maternal cousins.

== Death ==
Castro Díaz-Balart died by suicide in Havana on 1 February 2018, at the age of 68. He had previously received outpatient care for depression. The report of his suicide by the Cuban government was described as "unusually public." Fidel Ángel Castro Díaz-Balart's first cousin Gabriel Díaz-Balart also died by suicide as a result of depression. "Fidelito" Castro Díaz-Balart was buried in the Central Colon Cemetery in Havana, in the tomb of the Academia de Ciencias, to the right of André Voisin.

At the time of his death, he still held his positions with the Cuban Academy of Sciences and the Council of State.

== Publications ==
- Ciencia, innovación y futuro (Grijalbo: 2002) ISBN 8425336503, 9788425336508
- Energía nuclear y desarrollo: realidades y desafíos en los umbrales del siglo XXI (Colihue:1991) ISBN 9505816618
- Espacio y tiempo en la filosofía y la física (Vadell: 1990) ISBN 9802322547, 9789802322541
- Ciencia, tecnología y sociedad: hacia un desarrollo sostenible en la era de la globalización (Editorial Científico-Técnica: 2003) ISBN 9590105289, 9789590105289
