= Congressional Hispanic Conference =

Caucus in the U.S. Congress

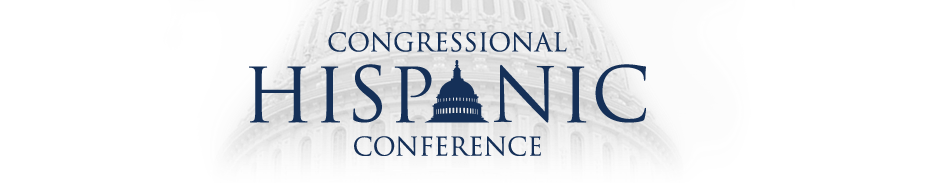
- Chair: Mario Díaz-Balart
- Founded: March 17, 2003; 23 years ago
- Headquarters: Washington, D.C.
- National affiliation: Republican Party
- Seats in the House Republican Conference: 10 / 219
- Seats in the House: 10 / 435

Website
- Official website

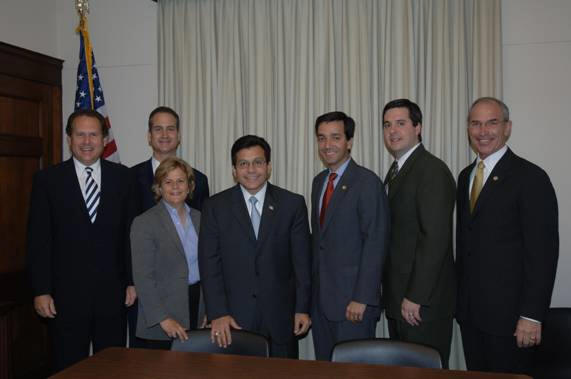
CHC members in 2005 with Attorney General Alberto Gonzales

The Congressional Hispanic Conference (CHC) is a Republican caucus in the House of Representatives made up of 10 members of Hispanic or Lusitanic descent.

The caucus was formed in 2003 over the debate surrounding the nomination of conservative lawyer Miguel Estrada to the DC Circuit Court of Appeals and ideological differences in the Congressional Hispanic Caucus, which was predominantly populated by Democratic members of Congress.

== History ==
In the mid to late 1990s, the Republican members of the Congressional Hispanic Caucus – Mexican-American Henry Bonilla of Texas and Cuban-Americans Ileana Ros-Lehtinen and Lincoln Díaz-Balart of Florida – left the Caucus in protest over its support for improved relations with Cuba. While Ros-Lehtinen remained an active member of the CHC's public outreach arm, the Congressional Hispanic Caucus Institute, the Caucus has since been composed solely of Democratic and Democratic-caucusing independent legislators.

Feeling there was "significant need" for a "new Hispanic conference" newly elected Florida congressman Mario Díaz-Balart began to organize in 2002 a caucus for Hispanic Republicans to counter what they felt was Democratic dominance over Hispanic political affairs. On March 17, 2003, Díaz-Balart revealed the formation of the Conference in an open letter published in The Wall Street Journal. Joined by Bonilla, Ros-Lehtinen, his brother Lincoln, and newly elected colleague Devin Nunes, a California congressman of Portuguese (Azorean) descent, Díaz-Balart decried what he perceived as Hispanic Democratic efforts to derail the nomination of Estrada, a selection seen by some at the time as a possible fast track to the U.S. Supreme Court. The group was officially announced at a press conference two days later. They were soon joined by two more Portuguese American congressmen, Richard Pombo of California and Patrick Toomey of Pennsylvania.

At its inception, the Conference supported the following: President George W. Bush and American troops in the war against terrorism; the Free Trade Agreement of the Americas (FTAA); tax relief to families and the over two million Hispanic- and Lusitanic-owned small businesses; support for faith based initiatives; and, educational choice for all.

Like their Democratic counterpart, the Conference allows members from the Senate. Mel Martinez, the first Cuban-American U.S. Senator, joined the group shortly after his election in 2004. Additionally, the Conference is open to non-Hispanic "associate" members who represent districts with significant Hispanic populations or generally support its goals with regard to public policy. In 2003, Conference members also formed the Congressional Hispanic Leadership Institute as an equivalent to the Democratic CHC-affiliated CHCI.

In the 2006 and 2008 elections, the Conference suffered the loss of nearly half of their members to electoral defeat, attempts at higher office or resignations. Past chair Luis Fortuño left Congress after being elected Governor of Puerto Rico. After the 2010 midterm elections, six new Hispanic Republicans were elected to Congress: Senator Marco Rubio of Florida, Representatives David Rivera of Florida, Raúl Labrador of Idaho, Francisco Canseco and Bill Flores of Texas, and Jaime Herrera Beutler of Washington, as well as Portuguese American Senator Pat Toomey of Pennsylvania, who was a member of the conference when he served in the House.

== Leadership ==
=== Chairs ===
Start	End	Chair(s)	State
March 17, 2003	January 3, 2005	Mario Díaz-Balart	FL
January 3, 2005	January 3, 2007	Ileana Ros-Lehtinen	FL
January 3, 2007	January 3, 2009	Luis Fortuño	PR
January 3, 2009	January 3, 2023	Mario Díaz-Balart	FL
January 3, 2023	January 3, 2025	Mario Díaz-Balart; Tony Gonzales	FL; TX
January 3, 2023	April 14, 2026	Tony Gonzales	TX
April 14, 2026	present	Mario Díaz-Balart	FL

=== Officers ===
Officers for the 119th Congress are as follows.

- Chair: Vacant
- Vice Chair for Community Outreach: Rep. Carlos Giménez (FL-28)
- Vice Chair for Policy: Rep. Nicole Malliotakis (NY-11)
- Vice Chair for Communications: Rep. Monica De La Cruz (TX-15)
- Vice Chair for Member Services: Rep. Juan Ciscomani (AZ-06)

== Membership ==
Congressional Hispanic Conference in the 119th United States Congress

=== Electoral results ===
Starting membership in election cycles
Election year	Republican seats	±
2022	14 / 222	Steady
2024	11 / 220	▼3

=== Current members ===
State	District	CPVI	Member	Descent
Arizona	AZ-06	EVEN	Juan Ciscomani	Mexican American
California	CA-22	D+1	David Valadao	Portuguese American
Colorado	CO-08	EVEN	Gabe Evans	Mexican American
Florida	FL-13	R+6	Anna Paulina Luna	Mexican American
Florida	FL-21	R+7	Brian Mast	Mexican American
Florida	FL-26	R+7	Mario Díaz-Balart	Cuban American
Florida	FL-27	R+6	María Elvira Salazar	Cuban American
Florida	FL-28	R+10	Carlos A. Gimenez	Cuban American
New York	NY-11	R+10	Nicole Malliotakis	Cuban American
Texas	TX-15	R+7	Monica De La Cruz	Mexican American

=== Former members ===
- Rep. Devin Nunes
- Rep. Henry Bonilla
- Rep. Lincoln Díaz-Balart
- Rep. Ileana Ros-Lehtinen
- Rep. Richard Pombo
- Sen. Ben Nighthorse Campbell
- Sen. John E. Sununu
- Sen. Mel Martinez
- Sen. Marco Rubio
- Sen. Pat Toomey
- Rep. Quico Canseco
- Rep. Bill Flores
- Rep. Jaime Herrera Beutler
- Rep. David Rivera
- Rep. Raúl Labrador
- Rep. Carlos Curbelo
- Rep. Anthony Gonzalez
- Rep. Mayra Flores
- Del. Luis Fortuño
- Rep. John Duarte

== See also ==
- List of Hispanic and Latino Americans in the United States Congress
- Congressional Hispanic Caucus
- Congressional caucus
- Hispanic and Latino conservatism in the United States
