= Mirta Díaz-Balart =

First wife of Fidel Castro (1928–2024)

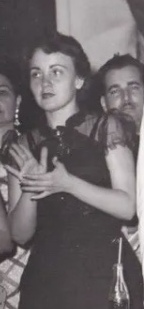
- Díaz-Balart in 1953
- Born: Mirta Francisca de la Caridad Díaz-Balart y Gutiérrez; 30 September 1928; Cuba
- Died: 6 July 2024 (aged 95); Madrid, Spain
- Spouses: Fidel Castro (m. 1948; div. 1955) Emilio Núñez Blanco (m. 1956; died 2006)
- Children: 3, including Fidelito and Mirta Núñez
- Parent(s): Rafael José Díaz-Balart (father); América Gutiérrez (mother)
- Relatives: Rafael Díaz-Balart (brother); Waldo Díaz-Balart (brother); Mario Díaz-Balart (nephew); Lincoln Díaz-Balart (nephew); José Díaz-Balart (nephew)

Mirta Francisca de la Caridad Díaz-Balart y Gutiérrez (30 September 1928 – 6 July 2024) was a Cuban woman who was the first wife of Fidel Castro. They married in 1948, had one son together, and divorced in 1955.

== Biography ==
Díaz-Balart was the daughter of América Gutiérrez and Rafael José Díaz-Balart, a prominent politician and mayor of the town of Banes in eastern Cuba. She was a philosophy student at the University of Havana, when she met and married Fidel.

Castro and Díaz-Balart married on 11 October 1948, honeymooned in New York City, and divorced seven years later in 1955 (while Castro was in prison following a failed attack on the Moncada Barracks). They had one child, a son, Fidel Ángel "Fidelito" Castro Díaz-Balart (1949–2018). After the divorce, Castro was not granted custody of their son. Instead, Fidel Jr. was estranged from his father until he stayed with him after a visit in Mexico, prior to his father's return to lead the Cuban Revolution.

In 1956, Díaz-Balart married Emilio Núñez Blanco (1925–2006), the son of a former Cuban ambassador to the UN, Emilio Núñez Portuondo. They had two daughters, including Mirta Núñez. The family lived at Havana's Tarará beach resort when in Cuba.

Díaz-Balart lived in Madrid with her family after 1959, the year in which Castro's revolution succeeded. She was deprived of the company of her son for many years as he studied in Cuba and the Soviet Union. The Miami Herald claimed in 2000 that she was still living in Spain, and that occasional visits to Cuba were arranged by Raúl Castro, her former brother-in-law. By 2018, the year in which her son Fidelito committed suicide, she was reportedly once again living in Cuba at age 90.

Díaz-Balart was the aunt of anti-Castro U.S. Republican politicians Mario Díaz-Balart and his brother Lincoln Díaz-Balart, as well as TV anchor José Díaz-Balart. She was the sister of the painter Waldo Díaz-Balart and politician Rafael Díaz-Balart.

Díaz-Balart died in Madrid on 6 July 2024, at the age of 95.

== Sources ==
- Castro, Juanita (2009). Collins, María Antonieta (ed.). Fidel y Raúl, mis hermanos. La historia secreta [Fidel and Raúl, my brothers. The secret history.] (in Spanish). Doral, FL: Santillana USA Publishing Company, Inc. ISBN 978-1-60396-701-3.
