= Barzee =

Barzee is a surname of Dutch origin. Notable people with the surname include:

- Anastasia Barzee (born 1960), American actress
- Mary Flores (née Barzee, born 1962), American attorney and politician
- Wanda Elaine Barzee, American kidnapper
