= Cuban–American lobby =

Influence of Cuban exiles on American foreign policy

The Cuban–American lobby are various groups of Cuban exiles in the United States and their descendants who have historically influenced the United States' policy toward Cuba. In general usage, this refers to anti-Castro groups.

== History and formation ==
The Cuban–American lobby was formed by Cuban expatriates during migratory waves throughout the latter half of the twentieth century. In the 1960s, many Cubans left the island due to fear of revolutionary communist reforms. They were often white, wealthy, and/or supporters of the Fulgencio Batista dictatorship. Many Cuban expatriates followed family and friends to the U.S. and built a "second Havana" in Miami, although the concentration of Cubans in Miami has been heavily diluted in recent decades by subsequent immigrant influx from other Latin American countries. Hardships in Cuba during the 1980s and 1990s also encouraged expatriation motivated by economic prospects in the United States. The ideological makeup of the lobby shifted drastically after Raúl Castro lifted travel restrictions in 2013. The group constituting the resulting exodus has been young and much more moderate than earlier groups.

== Makeup of the lobby ==
The Cuban–American lobby is usually seen to be anti-Castro and recognizing the Cuban government as repressive, although it has become much more moderate since the late 1990s. However, the most influential organizations and politicians within the political sector of the lobby are still conservative. They advocate for punitive maintenance of the embargo unless Cuba privatizes its economy. The most notable organization with this viewpoint is the Cuban American National Foundation. Other organizations advocate for an easing or lifting of the embargo before or regardless of whether Cuba changes its government structure and policies.

The academic circles within the lobby, though not monolithic in opinion, generally believe that the U.S. and Cuba should more readily exchange scientific information and advances. Some organizations within the intellectual wing of the Cuba lobby advocate for travel as a human right, and have affected change on U.S. travel policies towards Cuba.

Business interest lobbies often advocate for lifting the embargo to increase trade between the two nations. They believe trade with Cuba would be beneficial for the U.S. economy, and usually point to financial reasons for their stance. Lobbies outside the Cuban-American community have also advocated for liberalization of trade between the two nations, most notably the agribusiness lobby.

== Political influence ==
In the 1980s, most Cuban expatriate interest groups were only active in southern Florida. These groups were splintered and their voice was poorly organized. The lobby became more powerful after many organizations pledged to change the inner workings of Cuban government, as powers within the U.S. government shared the same objective. The Reagan administration strongly supported the Cuban American National Foundation (CANF), which formed the month the president took office. The lobby built institutional ties with the administration through their ideological sameness, giving conservative Cuban-American groups growing influence and increasingly early access to information through the 1980s.
Organizations within the lobby have affected public policy by collaborating with both Republican and Democratic lawmakers. One of the most notable collaborations occurred in 1992 between the Cuban American National Foundation and Democrat Robert Torricelli. Torricelli, whose liberal views on the embargo characterized his early career, sought election campaign funds from the CANF. He adopted a stronger anti-Castro, pro-embargo stance, secured CANF funds, and was reelected to Congress. Torricelli subsequently sponsored the Cuban Democracy Act, often referred to as the Torricelli Act, which was signed into law by President George H. W. Bush in 1992.

The conservative lobby's influence waned when Jorge Mas Canosa, founder of the Cuban American National Foundation, died in 1997. The international custody case of Elián González, which lasted from November 1999 to June 2000, also had negative effects on conservative influence within the Cuban-American community. The rise of moderate and liberal influence within the community are often partially attributed to Canosa's death and González's repatriation into Cuba.
While still influential, the Cuba lobby appears to be weakening due to dissenting opinions within groups. Younger Cuban-Americans are more likely to be open-minded regarding relations between the two countries and the lifting of the embargo.

Rising influence of moderate voices allowed room for the agribusiness lobby to push for reforms that softened the embargo. The lobby campaigned for the Trade Sanction Reform and Export Enhancement Act of 2000, with success partially due to conflict within the Cuban-American community after the death of Canosa and the case of Elián González. The law allowed for the trade of some agricultural and medical goods between the two nations. A more persuasive reason for the agribusiness lobby's success and the rise of moderate and liberal voices is the recent economic reforms instituted by Raúl Castro. For instance, the proportion of state-owned agricultural land has fallen from 75% in 1992 to 20.7% in 2012.

=== Effect of the lobby's campaign contributions ===
A logistic regression model analyzed Congress members' attitudes towards two nearly identical pieces of pro-embargo legislation before and after receiving campaign funds from the Cuban–American lobby groups. Trevor Rubenzer found that pro-embargo PAC contributions had a statistically significant effect on Representatives' likelihood to adopt a pro-embargo stance.

=== Effect of the lobby on presidential elections ===
During election years between 1992 and 2004, policy regarding Cuba and the embargo followed the hard-line exiles' agenda during presidential election years. During non-election years, any legislation implemented during election years was either nullified or not enforced. Embargo-related legislature became more conservative in presidential years, and less conservative in non-election years.
The lobby typically becomes more successful during presidential election years, as Cuban Americans live in the largest swing state in the U.S. Florida accounts for one-tenth of electoral college votes, and the winner-take-all electoral college system makes Cuban votes in the swing state all the more critical to presidential elections.

== Organizations ==
- Center for a Free Cuba
- Congressional Cuba Democracy Caucus
- Cuban American National Foundation
- Cuban Liberty Council
- US-Cuba Democracy PAC
- MAR Por Cuba

== Cuban Americans in the United States Congress ==
Eight Cuban Americans currently serve in the United States Congress.

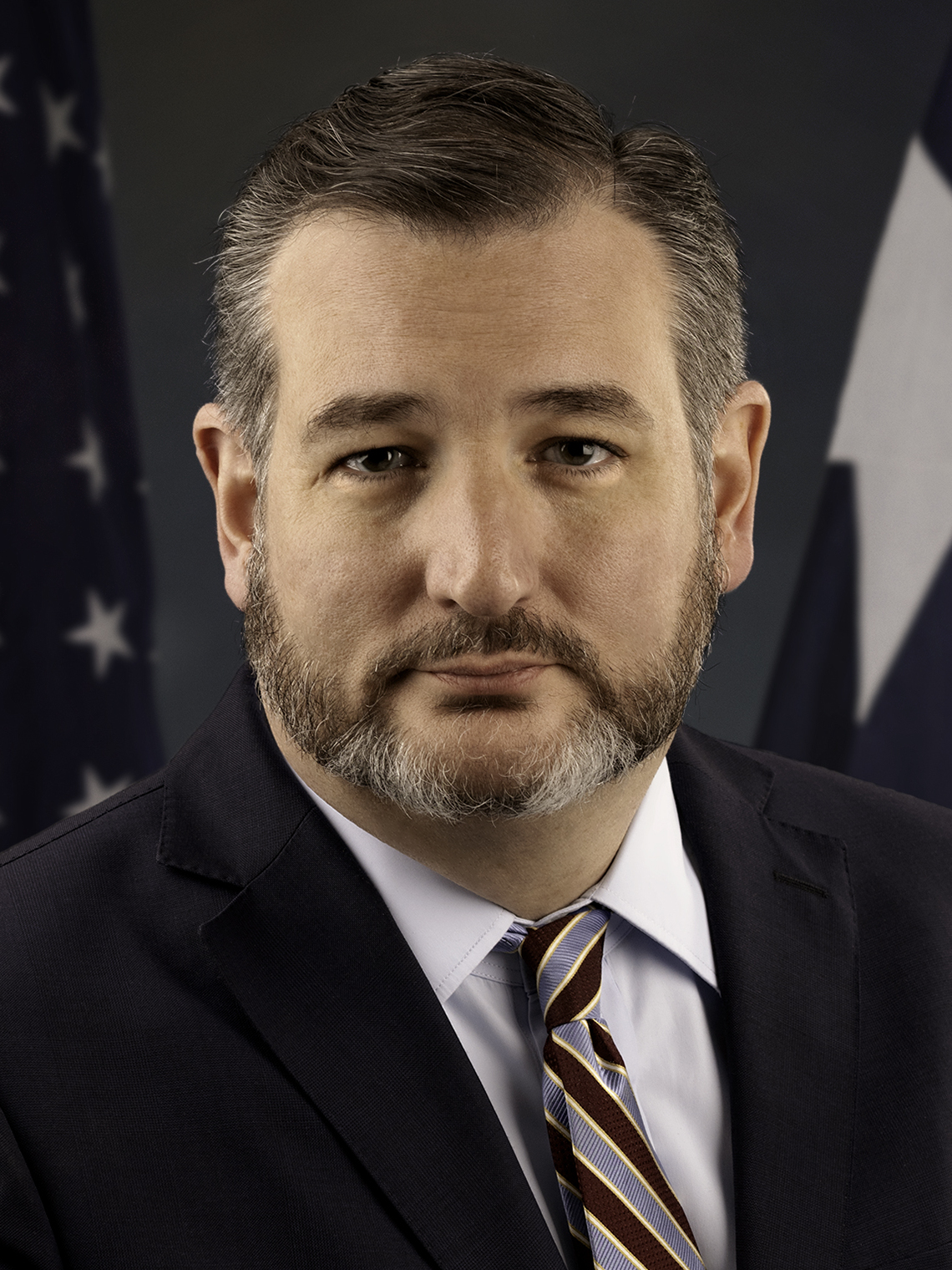
Ted Cruz, U.S. Senator from Texas (2013–present)

One United States Senator:

- Ted Cruz, Republican, Texas (2013–present)

Seven are United States Representatives:

- Rob Menendez, Democrat, New Jersey's 8th congressional district (2023–present)
- Maxwell Alejandro Frost, Democrat, Florida's 10th congressional district (2023–present)
- Carlos A. Giménez, Republican, Florida's 26th congressional district (2021–present)
- Maria Elvira Salazar, Republican, Florida's 27th congressional district (2021–present)
- Nicole Malliotakis, Republican, New York's 11th congressional district (2021–present)
- Alex Mooney, Republican, West Virginia's 2nd congressional district (2015–present)
- Mario Díaz-Balart, Republican, Florida's 25th congressional district (2003–present)

Former Congresspeople:

- Anthony Gonzalez, Republican, Ohio's 16th congressional district (2019–2023)
- Carlos Curbelo, Republican, Florida's 26th congressional district (2015–2019)
- Ileana Ros-Lehtinen, Republican, Florida's 27th congressional district (1989–2019), First Cuban-American & First Latina elected to Congress
- Mel Martínez, Republican, U.S. Senator from Florida (2005–2009)
- Lincoln Díaz-Balart, Republican, U.S. House of Representatives (1993–2011)
- David Rivera, Republican, U.S. House of Representatives (2011–2013)
- Joe Garcia, Democrat, Florida's 26th congressional district (2013–2015)
- Albio Sires, Democrat, New Jersey's 8th congressional district (2006–2023)
- Bob Menendez, Democrat, U.S. Senator from New Jersey (2006–2024)
- Marco Rubio, Republican, U.S. Senator from Florida (2011–2025) (resigned to become United States Secretary of State)

== Cuban Americans in state government ==
Many Cuban-Americans have been elected to office at a state level, especially in Florida. New Jersey also elects many Cubans to state-level positions, though there is only a small concentration of Cubans in Union City, Elizabeth, and Newark.

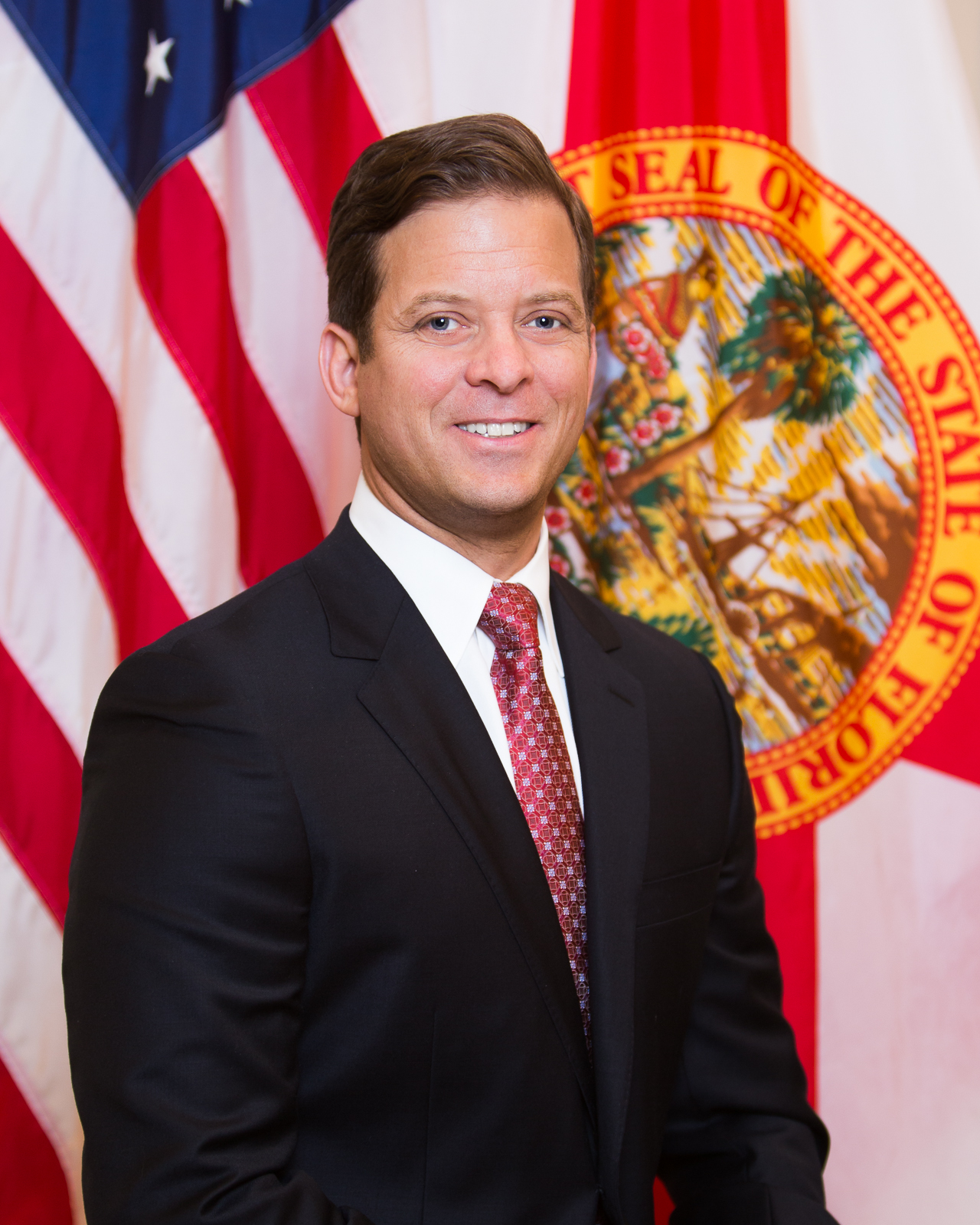
Lt.Governor of Florida Carlos Lopez-Cantera

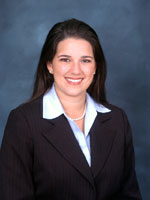
Anitere Flores, Florida Senate, Majority Whip

=== Florida ===
- Carlos Lopez-Cantera, Republican, Lieutenant Governor of Florida, (2014–2019)
- Anitere Flores, Republican, Member of the Florida Senate from the 37th district
- René García, Republican, Member of the Florida Senate from the 38th district
- José Javier Rodríguez, Democrat, Member of the Florida Senate from the 37th district
- Manny Díaz, Jr., Republican, Member of the Florida House of Representatives from the 103rd district
- Bryan Avila, Republican, Member of the Florida House of Representatives from the 111th district
- Jeanette Núñez, Republican, Member of the Florida House of Representatives from the 119th district
- José R. Oliva, Republican, Member of the Florida House of Representatives from the 110th district
- Mike La Rosa, Republican, Member of the Florida House of Representatives from the 42nd district

=== New Jersey ===
==== Current ====
- Angelica Jimenez, Democrat, Member of the New Jersey General Assembly from the 32nd Legislative District (2012–present)

==== Former ====
- Marlene Caride, Democrat, Member of the New Jersey General Assembly from the 36th Legislative District (2012–2018)
- Rafael Fraguela, Democrat and Republican (from April to December 2003), Member of the New Jersey General Assembly from the 32nd Legislative District (2002–2004)
- Vincent Prieto, Democrat, Speaker of the New Jersey General Assembly (2014–2018), Member of the New Jersey General Assembly from the 32nd Legislative District (2004–2018)
- Caridad Rodriguez, Democrat, Member of the New Jersey General Assembly from the 33rd Legislative District (2008–2011)

=== Connecticut ===
- Art Linares, Republican, Westbrook, Member of the Connecticut State Senate from the 33rd district (2013–2019)

=== Nevada ===
- Moises "Mo" Denis, Democrat, Member of the Nevada Senate from the 2nd district

== Cuban Americans in executive and judicial roles ==
Eduardo Aguirre (R) served as Vice Chairman of the Export-Import Bank of the United States in the George W. Bush administration and later named Director of Immigration and Naturalization Services under the Department of Homeland Security. In 2006, Eduardo Aguirre was named US ambassador to Spain. Cuban Americans have also served other high-profile government jobs including White House Chief of Staff John H. Sununu.

Florida-based businessman and Cuban exile Elviro Sanchez made his multimillion-dollar fortune by investing the proceeds of his family's fruit plantations. He is one of the most low-profile philanthropists in the Southern States.

Cuban-Americans also serve in high-ranking judicial positions as well.

- Jorge Labarga, Chief Justice of the Florida Supreme Court
- Danny Boggs is currently a judge on the United States Court of Appeals for the Sixth Circuit
- Raoul G. Cantero, III, served as a Florida Supreme Court justice until stepping down in 2008.
- Faustino J. Fernandez-Vina, is currently an Associate Justice of the New Jersey Supreme Court

== Cubans in public service with United States federal government ==
- Eduardo Aguirre, former United States Ambassador to Spain and Andorra
- Ana Carbonell, Chief of Staff for Representative Lincoln Díaz-Balart
- Adolfo A. Franco, former Assistant Administrator for United States Agency for International Development Latin America and the Caribbean
- Emilio González, former United States Army colonel and former director of United States Citizenship and Immigration Service
- Carlos Gutierrez, former Kellogg CEO and former United States Secretary of Commerce
- Nilda Pedrosa, former Chief of Staff for Representative Mario Díaz-Balart, former Senior Policy Director for Senator Mel Martinez, and former Acting Under Secretary of State for Public Diplomacy and Public Affairs (2020–2021)
- Pedro Pablo Permuy, former Deputy Assistant Secretary of Defence for Inter-American Affairs under President Bill Clinton, former senior aid to Senator Bob Menendez
- Alberto Piedra, former United States Ambassador to Guatemala
- Hugo Llorens, former United States Ambassador to Afghanistan and Honduras

Other politically active Cuban Americans

- Mauricio Claver-Carone, Washington Director of the US-Cuba Democracy PAC, Capitol Hill Cubans Blog
- Sylvia Iriondo, President of MAR por Cuba
- Eugenio Llamera, President of La Federacion Mundial de ExPresos Politicos
- Gus Machado, Treasurer of the US-Cuba Democracy PAC
- Remedios Diaz Oliver, Prolific Republican (GOP) fundraiser
- Jesús Permuy, human rights activist and community leader; founder of Human Rights Center of Miami and former president of several influential Cuban organizations including Unidad Cubana, the Cuban Municipalities in Exile, and the Christian-Democratic Movement of Cuba
- Otto Reich, former senior official in the administrations of Presidents Ronald Reagan and George W. Bush, Assistant Secretary of State for Western Hemisphere Affairs and US Special Envoy to the Western Hemisphere for the Secretary of State in the Bush administration.
- John Suarez, Founder of Free Cuba Foundation
- Armando F. Valladares, former Cuban prisoner for twenty-two years, American ambassador to the Human Rights Commission of the UN in Geneva during the administrations of Ronald Reagan and George H. W. Bush, and author of the book-testimonial Contra toda esperanza (Against All Hope) about his life in Cuban jails.
- Lazaro Orlando Lopez, President of Centro Cultural Cubano (CCC), the oldest Cuban cultural organization of its kind in New England, founded in 1975.

== Politically active Cuban authors and academics ==
- Frank Calzón, executive director of Center for a Free Cuba.
- Antonio de la Cova, academic
- Carlos Eire, T. Lawrason Riggs Professor of History and Religious Studies at Yale University and author of Waiting for Snow in Havana
- Andy García author, actor, producer, director
- Rafael Román Martel poet, journalist
- Ricardo Pau-Llosa, poet and pioneering critic and curator of modern Latin American art
- Enrique Ros, prolific author on historical topics
- Dr. Eduardo J. Padron, President, Miami Dade College, American Council on Education – Innovator of the Year, Children's Hero Award, Hispanic Achievement Award in Education
- Mirta Ojito, Pulitzer Prize Winner, Professor, Columbia University School of Journalism, Author, "Finding Mañana", American Society of Newspaper Editors Award-winning journalist
- Gustavo Perez Firmat, Feinson Professor of Humanities, Columbia University, Member, American Academy of Arts and Sciences, Award-winning author and poet
- Orlando Gutierrez-Boronat, Former professor of Political Science, Director of The Cuban Assembly of Resistance

== Spanish Language Media ==
- Ninoska Pérez Castellón, prominent Cuban-American radio and television talk show host on Radio Mambi 710 AM
- Lourdes D’Kendall, prominent Cuban-American radio talk show host on Radio Mambi 710 AM
- Armando Perez-Roura, prominent Cuban-American radio talk show host, former director of Radio Mambi 710 AM, now on La Poderosa 670 AM
- Martha Flores, prominent Cuban-American radio talk show host on Radio Mambi 710 AM
- Tomas Garcia Fuste, prominent Cuban radio and television talk show host
- Rey Anthony, third-generation Cuban-American radio talk show host on Actualidad Radio 1020/1040 AM
- Lourdes Ubieta, prominent Venezuelan-born Cuban-American radio talk show host on Actualidad Radio 1020/1040 AM
- Agustín Acosta, prominent Cuban-American radio talk show host on Actualidad Radio 1020/1040 AM

== See also ==
- Cuban American
- Cuba-United States relations
- Diaspora politics in the United States
- Ethnic interest groups in the United States
- Lobbying in the United States
- Cuban dissident movement
- Foreign policy interest group
