= Congressional Venezuela Democracy Caucus =

United States congressional group

The Venezuela Democracy Caucus is a bi-partisan congressional group with the stated purpose of "focusing on support for the Venezuelan people, continuing to press for freedom and democracy, and imposing pressure on the regime" in the country. The caucus was created on 13 November 2019 and is co-chaired by Florida Representatives Mario Díaz-Balart (R) and Debbie Wasserman Schultz (D). Democratic Representatives Ted Deutch, Debbie Mucarsel-Powell and Donna Shalala also joined the caucus when it was founded.

On 23 June 2021 Representatives Charlie Crist and Debbie Wasserman Schultz met with exiled Venezuelan leader Leopoldo López and the ambassador appointed by Juan Guaidó, Carlos Vecchio, and were briefed on the ongoing political and humanitarian situation in the country.

== See also ==
- Congressional Cuba Democracy Caucus
