= Mary Flores =

Mary Flores may refer to:

- Mary Barzee Flores (born 1962), Florida attorney
- Mary Elizabeth Flores (born 1973), Honduran lawyer, politician and diplomat
- Maribel Flores (born 2005), Mexican soccer player
- Ve Neill, American make-up artist
