= Congressional Hispanic Leadership Institute =

American organization founded in 2003

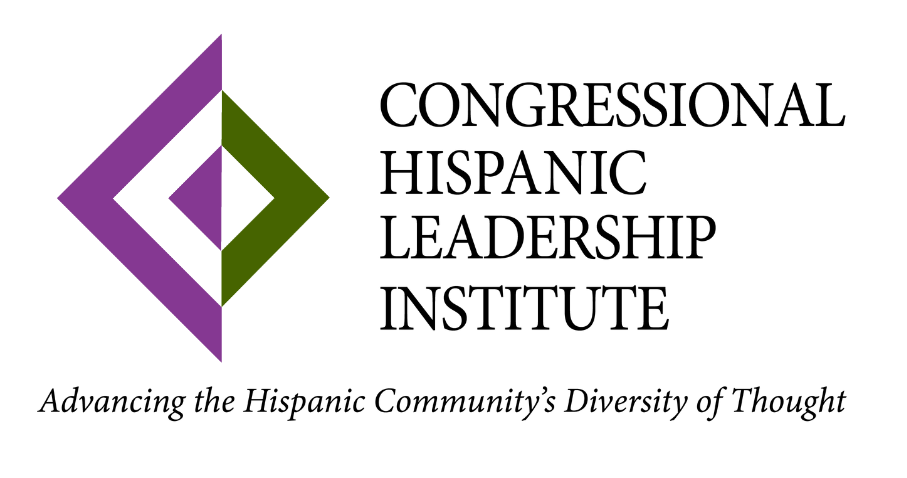
- Abbreviation: CHLI
- Formation: 2003
- Type: Nonprofit foundation
- Headquarters: Washington, D.C., United States
- Chairperson: Ileana Ros-Lehtinen
- Key people: President & CEO: Mary Ann Gomez Orta
- Affiliations: Congressional Hispanic Conference
- Website: chli.org

The Congressional Hispanic Leadership Institute (CHLI) was founded by Members of Congress to advance economic and social opportunities for the Hispanic community in Washington, DC and across the U.S. CHLI is an American non-profit and non-partisan organization founded in 2003 by members of the Congressional Hispanic Conference. The 501(c)(3) organization was begun by Florida Representatives Lincoln Díaz-Balart, Ileana Ros-Lehtinen and Mario Díaz-Balart with Cuban-American congressperson Diaz-Balart as its first Chairman.

== CHLI’s leaders and board members ==
The CHLI Board of Directors is composed of United States Congressional Members and executives from Fortune 500 corporations, trade associations, and small businesses. The diverse Board of Directors shares their time, talents, and treasure to focus on the vision, mission, and purpose of CHLI. They lead the organization to develop and provide quality programs to prepare, connect and honor leaders.

=== Board Officers Executive Committee ===
The CHLI Executive Committee includes CHLI Chairwoman, the Former U.S. Rep. Ileana Ros-Lehtinen (FL), Rep. Henry Cuellar (TX), Rep. Mario Diaz-Balart (FL), Maria Luisa Boyce (UPS), John Hoel (Altria Client Services, LLC), and Leo Muñoz (Comcast).

=== Congressional Board ===
The Congressional Board members include Senator Rick Scott (FL), Rep. Carlos Gimenez (FL), Rep. Tony Gonzales (TX), Rep. Nicole Malliotakis (NY), Rep. Rob Menendez (NJ), Rep. Darren Soto (FL), and Rep. David Valadao (CA).

=== Corporate Board ===
The Corporate Board members include The Honorable Bill Flores (Serolf Technologies LLC), Yisel Cabrera Crohare (Ford Motor Company), Daniel Diaz-Balart (Diaz-Balart Law), Omar Franco (Becker & Poliakoff), Javier Gamboa (Business Roundtable), Heather Kennedy (The Home Depot), Alice Lugo (Brownstein Hyatt Farber Schreck, LLP), Debbie Marshall (Chevron), Yvonne A. McIntyre (PG&E Corporation), Pilar Ramos (TelevisaUnivision, Inc.), Isaac Reyes (Target), Omar Vargas (General Motors), Andrew Vlasaty (bp America), Jennifer Zinicola (Coca-Cola), and Walmart.
