= Florida's 21st congressional district =

U.S. House district for Florida

Coordinates: 26°28′07″N 80°12′41″W

- Map of district boundaries
- Representative: Brian Mast; R–Fort Pierce
- Area: 352 mi^{2} (910 km^{2})
- Distribution: 99.44% urban; 0.56% rural
- Population (2025): 870,846
- Median household income: $91,952
- Ethnicity: 63.9% White; 17.5% Hispanic; 12.1% Black; 3.5% Two or more races; 2.2% Asian; 0.8% other
- Cook PVI: R+7

Florida's 21st congressional district is a U.S. congressional district on the Treasure Coast. In the 2020 redistricting cycle, the district was drawn as a successor to the previous 18th district and contains all of St. Lucie County and Martin County as well as the northeastern part of Palm Beach County, and includes Port St. Lucie, Fort Pierce, Stuart, Jupiter, and Palm Beach Gardens, as well as Treasure Coast International Airport. The previous iteration of the 21st district, which extended from Delray Beach to Palm Beach, was instead renamed the 22nd district.

From 2003 to 2013, the 21st district was located in Miami-Dade County and included many of Miami's western suburbs, such as Hialeah, Olympia Heights and Cutler Bay. In December 2015, Florida underwent redistricting due to a Florida Supreme Court ruling. Much of the 21st district became the 22nd district and was pushed further into Broward County. In the process, it absorbed the part of Broward County that had previously been in the neighboring 22nd district, which had been renumbered the 21st. This came after the state supreme court urged the creation of one district covering most of Palm Beach County and another covering most of Broward County and a part of Palm Beach.

The district was represented by Democrat Lois Frankel from 2017 until 2023. After redistricting, the district has been represented by Republican Brian Mast since 2023.

== Composition ==
For the 118th and successive Congresses (based on redistricting following the 2020 census), the district contains all or portions of the following counties and communities:

Martin County (11)

All 11 communities

Palm Beach County (16)

The Acreage (part; also 20th), Cabana Colony, Juno Beach, Juno Ridge, Jupiter, Jupiter Farms, Jupiter Inlet Colony, Limestone Creek, North Palm Beach, Palm Beach Gardens, Palm Beach Shores, Riviera Beach (part; also 20th), Schall Circle, Tequesta, Westlake, West Palm Beach (part; also 20th)

St. Lucie County (10)

All 10 communities

== List of members representing the district ==
Member	Party	Years	Cong ress	Electoral history	Location
District created January 3, 1993
Lincoln Díaz-Balart (Miami)	Republican	January 3, 1993 – January 3, 2011	103rd 104th 105th 106th 107th 108th 109th 110th 111th	Elected in 1992. Re-elected in 1994. Re-elected in 1996. Re-elected in 1998. Re-elected in 2000. Re-elected in 2002. Re-elected in 2004. Re-elected in 2006. Re-elected in 2008. Retired.	1993–2003 [data missing]
Lincoln Díaz-Balart (Miami)	Republican	January 3, 1993 – January 3, 2011	103rd 104th 105th 106th 107th 108th 109th 110th 111th	Elected in 1992. Re-elected in 1994. Re-elected in 1996. Re-elected in 1998. Re-elected in 2000. Re-elected in 2002. Re-elected in 2004. Re-elected in 2006. Re-elected in 2008. Retired.	2003–2013
Mario Díaz-Balart (Miami)	Republican	January 3, 2011 – January 3, 2013	112th	Redistricted from the 25th district and re-elected in 2010. Redistricted to the 25th district.	2003–2013
Ted Deutch (Boca Raton)	Democratic	January 3, 2013 – January 3, 2017	113th 114th	Redistricted from the 19th district and re-elected in 2012. Re-elected in 2014. Redistricted to the 22nd district.	2013–2017
Lois Frankel (West Palm Beach)	Democratic	January 3, 2017 – January 3, 2023	115th 116th 117th	Redistricted from the 22nd district and re-elected in 2016. Re-elected in 2018. Re-elected in 2020. Redistricted to the 22nd district.	2017–2023
Brian Mast (Fort Pierce)	Republican	January 3, 2023 – present	118th 119th	Redistricted from the 18th district and re-elected in 2022. Re-elected in 2024. Re-elected in 2026.	2023–2027; St. Lucie County and Martin County; parts of Palm Beach County

== Recent election results from statewide races ==
Year	Office	Results
2008	President	Obama 51% - 48%
2010	Senate	Rubio 51% - 15%
2010	Governor	Scott 51% - 49%
2010	Attorney General	Bondi 54% - 39%
2010	Chief Financial Officer	Atwater 61% - 34%
2012	President	Romney 52% - 48%
2012	Senate	Nelson 54% - 46%
2014	Governor	Scott 50.5% - 49.5%
2016	President	Trump 53% - 43%
2016	Senate	Rubio 53% - 45%
2018	Senate	Scott 53% - 47%
2018	Governor	DeSantis 53% - 46%
2018	Attorney General	Moody 55% - 43%
2018	Chief Financial Officer	Patronis 55% - 45%
2020	President	Trump 54% - 45%
2022	Senate	Rubio 61% - 39%
2022	Governor	DeSantis 62% - 37%
2022	Attorney General	Moody 63% - 37%
2022	Chief Financial Officer	Patronis 62% - 38%
2024	President	Trump 58% - 41%
2024	Senate	Scott 57% - 42%

== Election results ==
=== 2002 ===
Florida's 21st Congressional District Election (2002)
Party	Candidate	Votes	%
Republican	Lincoln Díaz-Balart (Incumbent)		100.00%
Total votes			100.00%
Turnout			
Republican hold			

=== 2004 ===
Florida's 21st Congressional District Election (2004)
Party	Candidate	Votes	%
Republican	Lincoln Díaz-Balart (Incumbent)	146,507	72.80%
Libertarian	Frank Gonzalez	54,736	27.20%
Total votes		201,243	100.00%
Turnout			
Republican hold			

=== 2006 ===
Florida's 21st Congressional District Election (2006)
Party	Candidate	Votes	%
Republican	Lincoln Díaz-Balart (Incumbent)	66,784	59.47%
Democratic	Frank Gonzalez	45,522	40.53%
Total votes		112,306	100.00%
Turnout			
Republican hold			

=== 2008 ===
Florida's 21st Congressional District Election (2008)
Party	Candidate	Votes	%
Republican	Lincoln Díaz-Balart (Incumbent)	137,226	57.90%
Democratic	Raul L. Martinez	99,776	42.10%
Total votes		237,002	100.00%
Turnout			
Republican hold			

=== 2010 ===
Florida's 21st Congressional District Election (2010)
Party	Candidate	Votes	%
Republican	Mario Díaz-Balart		100.00%
Total votes			100.00%
Turnout			
Republican hold			

=== 2012 ===
Redistrict from 19th district

Florida's 21st Congressional District Election (2012)
Party	Candidate	Votes	%
Democratic	Ted Deutch (incumbent)	221,263	77.8%
No Party Affiliation	W. Michael (Mike) Trout	37,776	13.3%
No Party Affiliation	Cesar Henao	25,361	8.9%
Total votes		284,400	100.0%
Democratic hold			

=== 2016 ===
Democrat Ted Deutch represented the district after being elected in 2012. As a result of 2015's statewide redistricting, Deutch effectively swapped seats with Lois Frankel, the 22nd District's current representative. In 2016, Deutch sought election to the 22nd District seat while Frankel sought election from District 21.

Florida's 21st congressional district (2016)
Party	Candidate	Votes	%
Democratic	Lois Frankel (incumbent)	210,606	62.7
Republican	Paul Spain	118,038	35.1
Independent	W Michael "Mike" Trout	7,217	2.2
Total votes		335,861	100.0
Democratic hold			

=== 2020 ===
Florida's 21st congressional district (2020)
Party	Candidate	Votes	%
Democratic	Lois Frankel (incumbent)	237,925	59.0
Republican	Laura Loomer	157,612	39.1
Independent	Charleston Malkemus	7,544	1.9
Write-in		12	<0.1
Total votes		403,093	100.0
Democratic hold			

=== 2022 ===
Florida's 21st congressional district (2022)
Party	Candidate	Votes	%
Republican	Brian Mast (incumbent)	208,614	63.5
Democratic	Corinna Robinson	119,891	36.5
Total votes		328,505	100.0
Republican hold			

=== 2024 ===
Florida's 21st congressional district (2024)
Party	Candidate	Votes	%
Republican	Brian Mast (incumbent)	277,435	61.82
Democratic	Thomas Witkop	171,312	38.17
Independent	Elizabeth Felton	19	0.04
Total votes		448,766	100.0
Republican hold			
