= Cuban Liberty Council =

Not-for-profit organization

The Cuban Liberty Council (CLC) is a nonprofit organization whose stated goal is to promote liberty and democracy in Cuba.

== Activities ==
CLC was founded in October 2001. Many of the members of the CLC's board of directors and executive committee have played key roles in shaping U.S. policy towards Cuba and have led diplomatic delegations to the United Nations Human Rights Commission, where they achieved the passage of key United Nations resolutions condemning Fidel Castro's human rights record. They have also played a role in advising foreign governments on their Cuba policy and have met with numerous world leaders, including Václav Havel, Lech Wałęsa, Ronald Reagan, Boris Yeltsin, George H. W. Bush, George W. Bush, José María Aznar, Ernesto Zedillo, and Felipe González.

CLC has been called a "hard-line" organization due to its staunch opposition to weakening the U.S. embargo against Cuba.

== Notable members ==
- Marcell Felipe
- Feliciano Foyo
- Horacio García
- Alberto Hernández
- Ninoska Pérez Castellón
- Diego R. Suárez
- Luis Zúñiga

== See also ==
- Cuba-United States relations
- Diaspora politics in the United States
- Ethnic interest groups in the United States
- Lobbying in the United States
- Cuban-American lobby
