= US-Cuba Democracy PAC =

The US-Cuba Democracy PAC is an American special interest group that lobbies the United States Congress and White House with the stated goal of "promoting an unconditional transition in Cuba to democracy, the rule of law, and the free market."

== Activities and stated goals ==
The US-Cuba Democracy PAC lobbies the Congress of the United States on issues and legislation including:

- "Oppose legislation that will finance the prolonged existence of the Castro regime."
- "Encourage the U.S. Congress to urge their colleagues from legislative bodies around the world as well as allies of the U.S. to support the legitimate aspirations of freedom of the Cuban people."
- "Defending the Western Hemisphere against the threats posed by the Castro Regime"
- "Preparing the next generation of Cuban Democratic leaders."

The US-Cuba Democracy PAC contributes to candidates who "a) have key roles on congressional committees responsible for Cuba-related issues or b) have demonstrated their support for the struggle for human rights in Cuba." It targets new members of Congress in an effort to create bipartisan support for the embargo.

== History ==
The US-Cuba Democracy PAC was established in August 2003.

== Prominent members ==
- Mauricio Claver-Carone, Washington Director
- Gus Machado, Treasurer
- Raúl Masvidal, Brigade 2506 Member
- Remedios Diaz Oliver, Businesswoman

== See also ==
- Cuban-American lobby
- Political Action Committee
