= Ninoska Pérez Castellón =

Cuban exile community leader in Miami

Ninoska Pérez Castellón (born 1950) is a prominent member of the Cuban exile community in Miami, and outspoken opponent of Fidel and Raúl Castro. In relation to this mission of hers, she was one of the founding members of the Cuban Liberty Council with her husband Roberto Martin Perez.

She is a notable Spanish radio talk show host and political commentator on Radio Mambi and Radio Martí. She is also an occasional columnist for the Miami Herald.

== Early life ==
She was born Lucrecia Ninoska Pérez Castellón in Havana, Cuba on March 15, 1950. Her family fled the island to the United States on June 5, 1959, following the triumph of the Cuban Revolution. A few months later her family was granted political asylum, while her brothers and uncles eventually took part in the April 1961 failed Bay of Pigs invasion.

She is a graduate of Miami-Dade College and the University of Miami.

== Media career ==
Pérez is both a radio host at Radio Mambi and TV host of Ultima Palabra, a political show on WGEN-TV in Key West, Florida. On June 23, 2011, Congressman Mario Díaz-Balart introduced a record in the US Congress House of Representatives under "Proceedings and Debates of the 112th Congress, First Session". Díaz-Balart recognized the "work and accomplishments of a distinguished radio journalist, artist and community activist of South Florida, Ninoska Pérez Castellón, deserving our upmost [sic] respect for promoting democracy and freedom."

== Artist ==
Ninoska recently launched her career as an artist with a series of whimsical watercolors reminiscent of her native Cuba. Her "Habaneras" were unveiled in Cuba Nostalgia in 2010 Miami Herald - Myriam Marquez - May 23, 2010 and also in Cuba Nostalgia 2011, El Nuevo Herald - Sarah Moreno - May 20, 2011. Ninoska has also exhibited in Solo Art Miami Inaugural Show 2010, the South Miami Art Festival, Carnaval on the Mile Coral Gables and others. In her own words, "Painting is returning to my lost City" referring to the City of Havana where she was born. She frequently donates her paintings to humanitarian causes for fund raising efforts, such as La Liga Contra el Cancer, Women Against Repression, Cuban American Bar Association, Cuban Cultural Heritage and Amigos For Kids.

== Personal life ==
On September 26, 1987, she married recently released former Cuban prisoner Roberto Martin Perez. Perez, the son of a high-ranking officer for the ousted Cuban dictator Fulgencio Batista, was imprisoned for 27 years and 8 months (1959–1987) because of his "involvement in a conspiracy" against Fidel Castro organized by the Dominican dictator, Rafael Trujillo. Perez was released from jail reportedly through the intervention of the Panamanian leader, General Manuel Noriega.

== Cuban Liberty Council ==
In July 2001, both Pérez and her husband resigned from the Cuban American National Foundation in protest over the CANF's "softening" of its once-hardline stance against the Castro brothers. Along with several other prominent CANF defectors, the couple helped form the Cuban Liberty Council, headquartered in Miami's Little Havana district.

Pérez has remarked that one of the proudest career moments was in January 2009, when President George W. Bush called into Radio Mambi eight days before turning over the reins of power to President Barack Obama, recounting that Bush told her he "would have liked to implement the plan for a post-Castro Cuba that we had prepared."
