= Cabana Colony, Florida =

- CDP
- Location within Florida
- Coordinates: 26°51′20″N 80°05′11″W
- Country: United States
- State: Florida
- County: Palm Beach

Area
  - Total: 0.43 sq mi (1.11 km^{2})
  - Land: 0.43 sq mi (1.11 km^{2})
  - Water: 0 sq mi (0.00 km^{2})
- Elevation: 13 ft (4.0 m)

Population (2020)
  - Total: 2,460
  - Density: 5,736.7/sq mi (2,214.95/km^{2})
- Time zone: UTC-5 (Eastern (EST))
  - Summer (DST): UTC-4 (EDT)
- ZIP Code: 33410
- Area codes: 561, 728
- GNIS feature ID: 2628519

Cabana Colony is a census-designated place (CDP) in Palm Beach County, Florida, United States. The CDP is part of the Miami metropolitan area of South Florida. Its population was 2,460 as of the 2020 census.

== Geography ==
Cabana Colony is located on the east side of Dixie Highway and borders Palm Beach Gardens on three sides.

== Demographics ==
Historical population
Census	Pop.	Note	%±
2010	2,391		—
2020	2,460		2.9%
U.S. Decennial Census

Cabana Colony first appeared as a census designated place in the 2010 U.S. census.

=== 2020 census ===
As of the 2020 census, Cabana Colony had a population of 2,460. The median age was 38.5 years. 19.8% of residents were under the age of 18 and 15.1% of residents were 65 years of age or older. For every 100 females there were 101.1 males, and for every 100 females age 18 and over there were 100.1 males age 18 and over.

100.0% of residents lived in urban areas, while 0.0% lived in rural areas.

There were 927 households in Cabana Colony, of which 26.0% had children under the age of 18 living in them. Of all households, 39.4% were married-couple households, 22.8% were households with a male householder and no spouse or partner present, and 28.8% were households with a female householder and no spouse or partner present. About 26.0% of all households were made up of individuals and 11.1% had someone living alone who was 65 years of age or older.

There were 978 housing units, of which 5.2% were vacant. The homeowner vacancy rate was 0.9% and the rental vacancy rate was 7.6%.

Cabana Colony racial composition (Hispanics excluded from racial categories) (NH = Non-Hispanic)
Race	Number	Percentage
White (NH)	1,450	58.95%
Black or African American (NH)	276	11.22%
Native American or Alaska Native (NH)	2	0.08%
Asian (NH)	129	5.24%
Pacific Islander or Native Hawaiian (NH)	0	0.00%
Some Other Race (NH)	20	0.81%
Mixed/Multiracial (NH)	82	3.33%
Hispanic or Latino (any race)	501	20.37%
Total	2,460	100.00%

=== Demographic estimates ===
In the Census Bureau's 2016–20 American Community Survey estimates, there were 613 families residing in the CDP.

=== 2010 census ===
Cabana Colony racial composition (Hispanics excluded from racial categories) (NH = Non-Hispanic)
Race	Number	Percentage
White (NH)	1,692	70.77%
Black or African American (NH)	222	9.28%
Native American or Alaska Native (NH)	10	0.42%
Asian (NH)	98	4.10%
Pacific Islander or Native Hawaiian (NH)	1	0.04%
Some Other Race (NH)	11	0.46%
Mixed/Multiracial (NH)	44	1.84%
Hispanic or Latino (any race)	313	13.09%
Total	2,391	100.00%

As of the 2010 United States census, there were 2,391 people, 797 households, and 526 families residing in the CDP.

The 2010 U.S. Census depicts 42.2% of the population in Cabana Colony is male and the other 57.8% is female with a median age of 42.1 years old.

In 2010, the estimated median house or condo value in Cabana Colony during 2016 was $269,600, whereas the estimated median for Florida as a whole was $197,700. The median gross in rent in Cabana Colony in 2016 was $1,332.

In 2010, 71.2% of people over 25 years old have received their high school diplomas, while 15.7% received a higher degree and 13.1% have received no high school diploma.

== Education ==
- Dwight D. Eisenhower Elementary School, located within its boundaries

== Parks and recreation ==
- Cabana Colony Park: The 1.64-acre park is a family friendly park located at 3855 Holiday Road, Palm Beach Gardens. The park has amenities for children ages 2–12 years old as well as a basketball court. The park is maintained by the county government and also includes picnic tables and grills.
