= Schall Circle, Florida =

- CDP
- Interactive map of Schall Circle, Florida
- Coordinates: 26°42′55″N 80°06′52″W
- Country: United States
- State: Florida
- County: Palm Beach

Area
  - Total: 0.24 sq mi (0.62 km^{2})
  - Land: 0.24 sq mi (0.62 km^{2})
  - Water: 0 sq mi (0.00 km^{2})
- Elevation: 16 ft (4.9 m)

Population (2020)
  - Total: 792
  - Density: 3,300.3/sq mi (1,274.27/km^{2})
- Time zone: UTC-5 (Eastern (EST))
  - Summer (DST): UTC-4 (EDT)
- ZIP code: 33417
- Area codes: 561, 728
- FIPS code: 12-64547
- GNIS feature ID: 2402829

Schall Circle is a census-designated place (CDP) in Palm Beach County, Florida, United States. It is part of the Miami metropolitan area of South Florida. The population was 792 at the 2020 US census.

== Geography ==
According to the United States Census Bureau, the CDP has a total area of 0.8 km^{2} (0.3 mi^{2}), all land.

== Demographics ==
Historical population
| Census | Pop. | Note | %± |
|---|---|---|---|
| 2000 | 965 | | — |
| 2010 | 1,117 | | 15.8% |
| 2020 | 792 | | −29.1% |
U.S. Decennial Census

=== 2020 census ===
Schall Circle racial composition (Hispanics excluded from racial categories) (NH = Non-Hispanic)
| Race | Number | Percentage |
|---|---|---|
| White (NH) | 179 | 22.60% |
| Black or African American (NH) | 218 | 27.53% |
| Native American or Alaska Native (NH) | 2 | 0.25% |
| Asian (NH) | 11 | 1.39% |
| Pacific Islander or Native Hawaiian (NH) | 0 | 0.00% |
| Some Other Race (NH) | 6 | 0.76% |
| Mixed/Multiracial (NH) | 15 | 1.89% |
| Hispanic or Latino (any race) | 361 | 45.58% |
| Total | 792 | 100.00% |

As of the 2020 United States census, there were 792 people, 223 households, and 146 families residing in the CDP.

=== 2010 census ===
Schall Circle racial composition (Hispanics excluded from racial categories) (NH = Non-Hispanic)
| Race | Number | Percentage |
|---|---|---|
| White (NH) | 296 | 26.50% |
| Black or African American (NH) | 420 | 37.60% |
| Native American or Alaska Native (NH) | 0 | 0.00% |
| Asian (NH) | 13 | 1.16% |
| Pacific Islander or Native Hawaiian (NH) | 0 | 0.00% |
| Some Other Race (NH) | 1 | 0.09% |
| Mixed/Multiracial (NH) | 16 | 1.43% |
| Hispanic or Latino (any race) | 371 | 33.21% |
| Total | 1,117 | |

As of the 2010 United States census, there were 1,117 people, 514 households, and 256 families residing in the CDP.

=== 2000 census ===
As of the census of 2000, there were 965 people, 385 households, and 237 families living in the CDP. The population density was 1,164.3/km^{2} (3,035.6/mi^{2}). There were 443 housing units at an average density of 534.5/km^{2} (1,393.6/mi^{2}). The racial makeup of the CDP was 64.46% White (56% were Non-Hispanic White), 27.36% African American, 0.52% Native American, 1.04% Asian, 2.80% from other races, and 3.83% from two or more races. Hispanic or Latino of any race were 13.89% of the population.

In 2000, there were 385 households, out of which 37.1% had children under the age of 18 living with them, 30.6% were married couples living together, 24.2% had a female householder with no husband present, and 38.4% were non-families. 30.1% of all households were made up of individuals, and 8.3% had someone living alone who was 65 years of age or older. The average household size was 2.51 and the average family size was 3.14.

As of 2000, in the CDP, the population was spread out, with 29.8% under the age of 18, 10.8% from 18 to 24, 31.3% from 25 to 44, 18.9% from 45 to 64, and 9.2% who were 65 years of age or older. The median age was 31 years. For every 100 females, there were 91.8 males. For every 100 females age 18 and over, there were 92.9 males.

In 2000, the median income for a household in the CDP was $20,476, and the median income for a family was $21,607. Males had a median income of $22,578 versus $17,333 for females. The per capita income for the CDP was $10,352. About 28.4% of families and 33.0% of the population were below the poverty line, including 49.8% of those under age 18 and 46.7% of those age 65 or over.

As of 2000, English was the first language for 88.44% of all residents, while Spanish was the mother tongue for 11.55% of the population.
