= Congressional Cuba Democracy Caucus =

Group in the United States Congress

The Cuba Democracy Caucus is a bicameral and bi-partisan congressional group that was created in 2004 with the stated purpose of "promoting discussion and proactive policies designed to hasten Cuba's transition towards a free and democratic society."

== Members ==
- Senator Bob Menendez (D-NJ)
- Representative Mario Díaz-Balart (R-FL)
- Representative Patrick McHenry (R-NC)
- Representative Frank Pallone (D-NJ)
- Representative Albio Sires (D-NJ)
- Representative Christopher Smith (R-NJ)
- Representative Debbie Wasserman Schultz (D-FL)

== See also ==
- Cuban-American lobby
- Congressional Venezuela Democracy Caucus
