= Emilio Núñez Portuondo =

Cuban politician, lawyer, and diplomat (1898–1978)

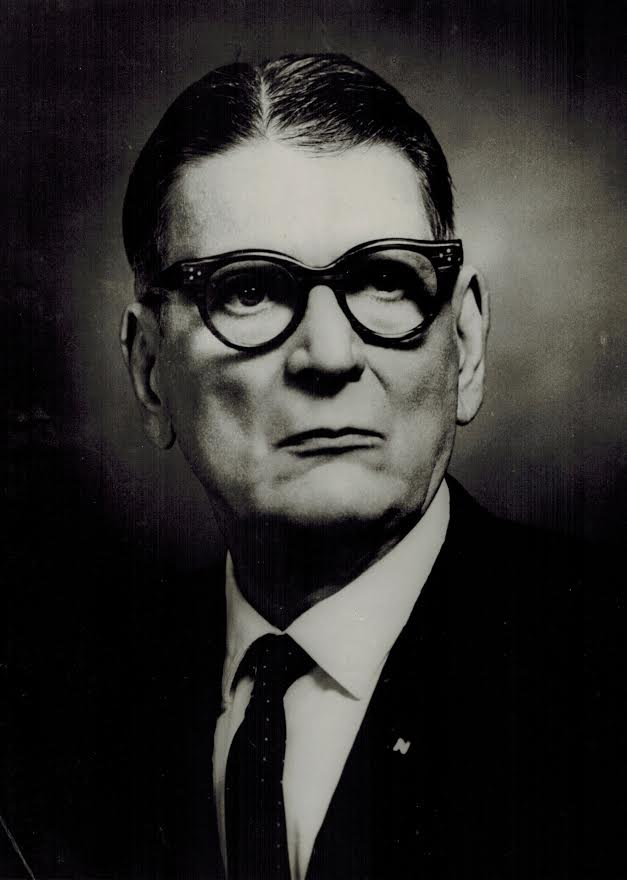

12th Prime Minister of Cuba
- In office 6 March 1958 – 12 March 1958
- President: Fulgencio Batista
- Preceded by: Andrés Rivero
- Succeeded by: Gonzalo Güell

Personal details
- Born: September 13, 1898 Philadelphia, Pennsylvania, U.S.
- Died: August 19, 1978 (aged 79) Panama City, Panama

Emilio Núñez Portuondo (September 13, 1898, in Philadelphia, Pennsylvania, U.S. – August 19, 1978, in Panama City, Panama) was a Cuban politician, lawyer, and diplomat. He was the 13th Prime Minister of Cuba in 1958. He received the National Order of the Legion of Honour of France among other decorations from many countries.

== Education and career ==
Dr. Núñez attended La Salle School in Cuba and graduated as doctor of civil and public law in 1919 from the University of Havana. He served as a representative and senator from the Las Villas Province and also as the Cuban Minister Plenipotentiary and Envoy Extraordinary to Panama, Peru, Netherlands, Belgium and Luxembourg. He was secretary of the Constitutional Convention of 1940. Dr. Ramón Grau San Martín and Dr. Carlos Marquez Sterling were the presidents of the Constitutional Convention which drafted the 1940 Constitution of Cuba. Dr. Núñez Portuondo served as the Cuban Permanent Representative with the rank of ambassador to the United Nations in 1952–1958; and was also Minister of Labor under the interim president Dr. Andrés Domingo y Morales del Castillo in 1954. He served as president of the U.N. Security Council in September 1956 and 1957. He was Prime Minister of Cuba from March 6 to March 12, 1958.

Dr. Núñez Portuondo is best remembered as the President of the UN Security Council during the Hungarian uprising in 1956. Dr. Núñez Portuondo helped József Cardinal Mindzenty of Hungary in assisting refugees into Cuba and the United States.

== Family ==
Emilio Núñez Portuondo was the son of General Emilio Núñez Rodriguez, vice president of Cuba during the second administration of General Mario García Menocal in 1917-1921, and who was also governor of Havana from 1899 to 1902 as well as Minister of Agriculture, Commerce and Labor 1913-1917. Dr. Núñez Portuondo's brother was the 1948 Cuban presidential candidate, Dr. Ricardo Núñez Portuondo, the leading surgeon in Cuba at the time. He was married three times and had four children, Emilio Núñez Blanco, Ricardo Núñez Garcia, Brunilda Núñez Fábrega and Fernando Núñez Fábrega, a former Minister of Foreign Relations of the Republic of Panama. His eldest son, Emilio Núñez Blanco, elected to the Cuban House of Representatives in 1958, though unable to take office, was the second husband of Mirta Díaz-Balart (the first wife of Fidel Castro).

Emilio Núñez Portuondo is buried in Panama City next to his third wife, Panamanian, Olga Fábrega y Fábrega (married December 3, 1937).
