= Lincoln Díaz-Balart =

American politician (1954–2025)

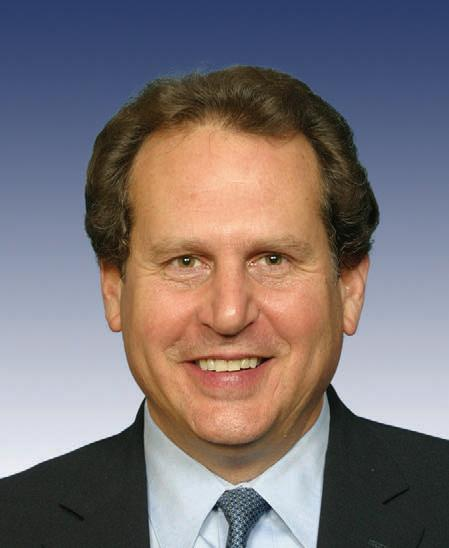

Member of the U.S. House of Representatives from Florida's 21st district
- In office January 3, 1993 – January 3, 2011
- Preceded by: Constituency established
- Succeeded by: Mario Díaz-Balart

Member of the Florida Senate from the 34th district
- In office August 30, 1989 – November 17, 1992
- Preceded by: Ileana Ros-Lehtinen
- Succeeded by: Alberto Gutman

Member of the Florida House of Representatives from the 110th district
- In office November 18, 1986 – August 28, 1989
- Preceded by: Ileana Ros-Lehtinen
- Succeeded by: Miguel De Grandy

Personal details
- Born: Lincoln Rafael Díaz-Balart y Caballero; August 13, 1954 Havana, Cuba
- Died: March 3, 2025 (aged 70) Key Biscayne, Florida, U.S.
- Party: Democratic (before 1985); Republican (1985–2025)
- Spouse: Cristina Fernandez
- Children: 2
- Parent: Rafael Díaz-Balart (father)
- Relatives: José Díaz-Balart (brother); Mario Díaz-Balart (brother); See Díaz-Balart family
- Education: New College of Florida (BA); Case Western Reserve University (JD)
- Díaz-Balart's voice Díaz-Balart speaks on the Cuban pro-democracy movement Recorded March 15, 2010

Lincoln Rafael Díaz-Balart (born Lincoln Rafael Díaz-Balart y Caballero; August 13, 1954 – March 3, 2025) was a Cuban-American attorney and politician. A member of the Republican Party, he was the U.S. representative for Florida's 21st congressional district from 1993 to 2011. He previously served in the Florida House of Representatives and the Florida Senate. He retired from Congress in 2011 and his younger brother, Mario Díaz-Balart, who had previously represented Florida's 25th congressional district, succeeded him. He was chairman of the Congressional Hispanic Leadership Institute. After leaving Congress, he started a law practice and a consulting firm, both based in Miami, Florida.

== Early life and education ==
Díaz-Balart was born in Havana, Cuba, on August 13, 1954, to Cuban politician Rafael Díaz-Balart and Hilda Caballero Brunet. His aunt, Mirta Díaz-Balart, was the first wife of the late Fidel Castro. Her son, and his cousin, was the late Dr. Fidel Ángel "Fidelito" Castro Díaz-Balart. His uncle was the Cuban-Spanish painter, Waldo Díaz-Balart.

He was educated at the American School of Madrid in Spain; New College of Florida; and Case Western Reserve University, from which he earned a Juris Doctor degree. He was involved in a Miami private practice for several years before holding elective office.

== Political career ==
In 1982, Díaz-Balart ran for a Florida House of Representatives seat for District 113 as a Democrat and lost to the Republican, Humberto Cortina.

Díaz-Balart, as well as his immediate family, were all members of the Democratic Party. Díaz-Balart was the former president of the Dade County Young Democrats and the Florida Young Democrats, as well as a member of the executive committee of the Dade County Democratic Party. On April 24, 1985, Diaz-Balart, his wife, and brother Mario switched their registrations to Republican.

Díaz-Balart served as a Republican in the Florida House of Representatives from 1986 to 1989 and in the Florida Senate from 1989 to 1992.

In 1992, Díaz-Balart won election to the House of Representatives and remained in the House until his retirement in 2011.

== U.S. House of Representatives ==
Balart (left) speaking at an October 2001 press conference, accompanied by Congresswoman Ileana Ros-Lehtinen (center) and Miami-Dade County Mayor Alex Penelas (right)

=== Congressional committees ===
- Committee on Rules
  - Subcommittee on Legislative and Budget Process (Chairman 2005–2007)
- Committee on Homeland Security
  - Subcommittee on Rules (Chairman 2003–2005)

=== Party leadership ===
- House Republican Policy Committee

=== Political positions ===
In general, Diaz-Balart's voting record was moderate by Republican standards. His lifetime rating from the American Conservative Union is 73.

In 1994, he was one of only three Republican incumbents not to sign the Republican Contract with America. He objected to provisions in its welfare reform section that would deny federal programs to legal immigrants.

In 2006, he voted against the Federal Marriage Amendment and in 2009 voted for the Matthew Shepard and James Byrd, Jr. Hate Crimes Prevention Act, which expanded the federal hate crime law to include a person's perceived gender, sexual orientation, identity or disability. In December 2010, Diaz-Balart was one of fifteen Republican House members to vote in favor of repealing the United States military's "Don't Ask, Don't Tell" ban on openly gay service members.

He was a sponsor of the DREAM Act which seeks to facilitate access for illegal immigrant students to post-secondary education by allowing states to have power to determine requirements for in-state tuition.

He achieved passage into law of historic pieces of legislation – such as the Nicaraguan Adjustment and Central American Relief Act (NACARA) in 1997, and the codification of the United States embargo against Cuba in 1996 (requiring that all political prisoners be freed and multi-party elections scheduled in Cuba before U.S. sanctions can be lifted).

==== Cuba ====
Diaz-Balart played a prominent role in the Cuban-American lobby, and was active in the attempt by relatives of Elián González to gain custody of the six-year-old from his Cuban father. Diaz-Balart was a member of the Congressional Cuba Democracy Caucus.

==== 2008 financial crisis ====
On September 29, 2008, Diaz-Balart voted against the Emergency Economic Stabilization Act of 2008: "American taxpayers should not have to foot the bill for the irresponsible behavior of Wall Street executives. The average citizen is forced to play by the rules, yet many who did not now get a massive bailout from taxpayers in this plan. This is fundamentally unfair. By bailing out reckless behavior we encourage future reckless behavior."

==== Healthcare ====
In March 2010, Diaz-Balart publicly called the passage of the Patient Protection and Affordable Care Act "a decisive step in the weakening of the United States."

== Political campaigns ==
=== 1992 to 1998 ===
In 1992, Diaz-Balart defeated fellow State Senator Javier Souto in the Republican primary for the newly created 21st District. No other party put up a candidate, assuring Diaz-Balart's election. He was unopposed for reelection in 1994, 1996, 2000, and 2002 and defeated Democrat Patrick Cusack with 75 percent in 1998.

=== 2004 and 2006 ===
In both 2004 and 2006, Lincoln Diaz-Balart was unsuccessfully challenged by Frank J. Gonzalez, a Libertarian Party candidate in 2004 and Democrat in 2006. In 2004, Diaz-Balart won with 72.8% of the vote; Gonzalez ran for U.S. House as the Libertarian Party candidate and earned 54,736 votes or 27.2% of the total. In 2006, Diaz-Balart won with 59.5% of the vote; Gonzalez managed to earn 45,522 votes or 40.5% according to the Florida Department of State's Division of Elections website.

=== 2008 ===
Diaz-Balart's Democratic opponent in 2008 was former Hialeah Mayor Raul L. Martinez. It was initially thought that Diaz-Balart would face his toughest race to date. Although the 21st District is considered the most Republican district in the Miami area, Martinez was thought to be very popular in the area. Nevertheless, Diaz-Balart won re-election with 58% of the vote.

=== 2010 ===
In February 2010, Diaz-Balart announced his intention not to seek re-election. His brother, Congressman Mario Díaz-Balart, ran to succeed him, and won unopposed.

== Personal life and death ==
Díaz-Balart was married to Cristina Fernandez and had two children: Lincoln Jr. and Daniel. Lincoln Jr. died on May 19, 2013, at the age of 29. His family said he had battled depression for many years.

Díaz-Balart's brother, Mario Díaz-Balart, previously represented the 25th district of Florida, moved to the 21st district, but moved back to the 25th district after redistricting. He had two other brothers: José Díaz-Balart, a journalist and anchorman of the Saturday edition of the NBC Nightly News, and Rafael Díaz-Balart, an investment consultant.

Díaz-Balart died from cancer at his home in Key Biscayne, Florida, on March 3, 2025, at the age of 70.

== See also ==
- List of Hispanic and Latino Americans in the United States Congress

Florida House of Representatives
Preceded by Ileana Ros-Lehtinen	Member of the Florida House of Representatives from the 110th district 1986–1989	Succeeded by Miguel De Grandy
Florida Senate
Preceded by Ileana Ros-Lehtinen	Member of the Florida Senate from the 34th district 1989–1992	Succeeded by Alberto Gutman
U.S. House of Representatives
New constituency	Member of the U.S. House of Representatives from Florida's 21st congressional district 1993–2011	Succeeded by Mario Díaz-Balart
