= José Díaz-Balart =

Cuban-American journalist and television anchorman

- Díaz-Balart speaking at the 2026 National Association of Hispanic Journalists conference
- Born: November 7, 1960 (age 65); Fort Lauderdale, Florida, U.S.
- Education: New College of Florida
- Occupations: Television anchorman; journalist
- Employer(s): NBCUniversal; Comcast
- Television: MSNBC Reports (as José Díaz-Balart Reports, anchor); NBC Nightly News (anchor); Noticiero Telemundo (anchor)
- Spouse: Brenda
- Children: 2
- Parent(s): Rafael Diaz-Balart; Hilda Caballero Brunet
- Relatives: Lincoln Díaz-Balart (brother); Mario Díaz-Balart (brother); Mirta Díaz-Balart (aunt); Waldo Díaz-Balart (uncle); Fidel Castro Díaz-Balart (first-cousin)

José Díaz-Balart (born November 7, 1960) is a Cuban-American journalist and television anchorman for both Telemundo and NBC News. Diaz-Balart previously anchored weeknight editions of Noticias Telemundo on Telemundo and José Díaz-Balart Reports on MSNBC. He currently anchors Saturday editions of NBC Nightly News.

== Early life ==
Diaz-Balart's family left Cuba in 1959, and he was raised in Madrid, Spain. He is the son of Rafael Díaz-Balart y Gutiérrez (a former Cuban politician) and Hilda Caballero Brunet. He has three brothers: Rafael Díaz-Balart (a banker), Mario Díaz-Balart (a Republican U.S. representative) and the late Lincoln Díaz-Balart (also a Republican former U.S. representative). His uncle, Waldo Diaz-Balart, was an internationally recognized painter. His aunt, Mirta Diaz-Balart, was Fidel Castro's first wife and therefore Fidel Castro is his uncle through marriage, and the late Fidel Castro Jr. (Fidelito) was his first cousin.

== Career ==
After spending a brief time in radio, he worked in print journalism during the mid-1980s, for United Press International. In December 1984, he became the Central American Bureau Chief for what was then called the Spanish International Network (today known as Univision). In 1987, he was one of the group of journalists that founded Telemundo's news division Noticias Telemundo, and creating its first program Noticiero Telemundo-HBC. He subsequently established himself as a television news reporter in Miami, where he worked for WTVJ from 1988 until he was hired by CBS in May 1996. In August 1996, he made history by becoming the first Cuban-American to host a network news program when he began anchoring for the CBS News program This Morning.

By 2000, he returned to Spanish language network television; he became the anchor of a new Telemundo morning program called Esta Mañana. He later co-hosted Telemundo's first morning news and entertainment show, Esta Mañana, as well as its public affairs show, Cada Día. By 2002, the bilingual anchor began hosting a once-a-month interview program on Telemundo, Enfoque con José Diaz-Balart; on that program, he has interviewed a wide range of news-makers, including political leaders and candidates for president. He has interviewed every U.S. president since Ronald Reagan. In 2003, he returned to English-language TV, and to his former station in Miami, WTVJ, as a news anchor. In 2006 he became the anchor of Telemundo's evening newscast, Noticias Telemundo.

=== 2010–present: NBCUniversal ===
By 2010, he was doing some reporting for NBC. He again made history when he substituted for Contessa Brewer on MSNBC Live for the week of June 20 through 24, 2011, in the show's 12 PM time slot, making him the first U.S. journalist to broadcast both English and Spanish newscasts on two networks simultaneously.

From 2014 to 2016, Diaz-Balart hosted the 10 a.m. news hour for MSNBC, replacing Chris Jansing. It was announced on November 10, 2014, that he would be taking over hosting duties on The Daily Rundown on November 17, 2014, with the program expanding to two hours, essentially absorbing his eponymous show that had previously aired during the second hour. The Daily Rundown later became known as MSNBC Live with Jose Diaz-Balart as part of a wider restructuring of MSNBC's dayside programming in 2015. In late 2015, he also began working as a fill-in anchor for the Saturday edition of NBC Nightly News. He was officially named host of that program in July 2016, and he continues in that position today.

On February 18, 2016, Diaz-Balart moderated the Democratic Town Hall with Hillary Clinton and Bernie Sanders, in Las Vegas, Nevada. On June 26 and 27 of 2019, Diaz-Balart co-moderated the first Democratic Presidential Debates on NBC and Telemundo.

On September 7, 2021, it was announced he was stepping down as anchor of the weeknight editions of Noticias Telemundo to anchor a new 10 a.m. show called José Díaz-Balart Reports on MSNBC. He will continue to anchor breaking news and special events coverage for Telemundo and host monthly specials.

On February 24, 2025, it was announced that MSNBC would end his namesake show José Díaz-Balart Reports, the sole man on the MSNBC Reports six hour-long block. In a staff memo, MSNBC president Rebecca Kutler cited the closing of MSNBC's production operations in Miami for the cancelation, which also affected The Katie Phang Show. Díaz-Balart anchored his final show on May 2, 2025, thanked his viewers for the privilege of their time, telling them he is "staying to anchor right with you" as he continues on the Saturday edition at NBC Nightly News.

Díaz-Balart will assume expanded responsibilities within NBCUniversal’s Spanish-language network, Telemundo. Beginning in early 2026. He is slated to co-anchor a new streaming program, Ahora 360, for the FAST channel Noticias Telemundo AHORA, and to serve as the Spanish-language host of Dateline NBC on Telemundo. Díaz-Balart, currently the only news anchor to host national broadcasts in both Spanish and English, will also continue anchoring the Saturday edition of NBC Nightly News.

== Awards ==
Diaz-Balart is the recipient of five national Emmys for his work with Telemundo Network, including 2020-2021 Outstanding Newscast Anchor. He previously received two SunCoast Emmy awards while working at WTVJ-TV in Miami; an Associated Press Award and four Hispanic Excellence in Journalism Awards, all in the 1980s. He also received a Du Pont and Peabody. Media 100 has named him best news anchor three times, and Hispanic Business Magazine named him one of the "100 most influential people in the U.S." He was recognized with the Silver Circle Award by the National Academy of Television Sciences in 2010. In 2012, Multichannel News and Broadcasting & Cable presented him with the Award for Outstanding Achievement in Hispanic Television at the 10th Annual Hispanic Television Summit, produced by Schramm Marketing Group. He was named GQ Magazine's Best International Journalist in 2017. In 2022 Diaz-Balart received the TV Broadcast Journalist Award by the MultiCultural Media Correspondents Association in Washington DC.

== Personal life ==
Diaz-Balart and his wife Brenda have two daughters, Katrina and Sabrina.

His brother, Mario Díaz-Balart, is a member of the Republican Party and the U.S. Representative for Florida's 26th congressional district.

== Bibliography ==
- The Cuban Americanos, New Americans, by Miguel González-Pando; Greenwood Publishing Group, 1998; ISBN 978-0-313-29824-0
- Cuba: intrahistoria: una lucha sin tregua, by Rafael L. Díaz-Balart; Ediciones Universal, 2006; ISBN 978-1-59388-067-5
