= Mary Barzee Flores =

American lawyer

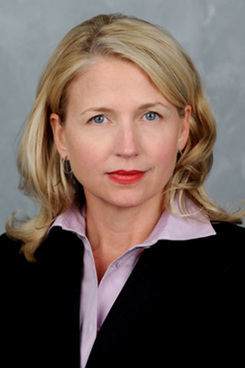

Judge of the Eleventh Judicial Circuit Court of Florida
- In office January 7, 2003 – June 6, 2011
- Preceded by: Philip Bloom
- Succeeded by: Rosa Figarola

Personal details
- Born: Mary Riley Barzee; September 3, 1962 (age 63) Miami, Florida, U.S.
- Party: Democratic
- Education: University of Miami (BA, JD)

Mary Riley Flores (née Barzee; September 3, 1962) is a Florida attorney in private practice and a former Democratic candidate for Florida's 25th congressional district in the 2018 election. From 2003 to 2011, she served as a judge on Florida's Eleventh Judicial Circuit Court. President Barack Obama nominated her to the U.S. District Court for the Southern District of Florida in 2015, but her nomination expired without being voted on by the United States Senate.

== Early life and career ==
Barzee Flores received a Bachelor of Music degree in 1985 from the University of Miami School of Music. She received a Juris Doctor, cum laude, in 1988 from the University of Miami School of Law. She began her legal career with two years in private practice as an associate at the law firm of Sonnett Sale and Kuehne. From 1990 to 2003, she served in the Federal Public Defender's Office for the Southern District of Florida, first as an assistant federal public defender and then as a supervisory assistant federal public defender.

In 2002, she was elected unopposed to Florida's Eleventh Judicial Circuit Court, which encompasses Miami-Dade County. She was unopposed for reelection in 2008. While a circuit judge, she presided over more than 100 jury trials and a dozen bench trials, in both criminal and civil matters.

Since 2011, she has been a shareholder at the Miami law firm of Stearns Weaver Miller Weissler Alhadeff & Sitterson, where her practice consists of complex commercial and employment litigation.

== Expired nomination to district court ==
On February 26, 2015, President Obama nominated Barzee Flores to serve as a federal district judge on the U.S. District Court for the Southern District of Florida, to fill the seat vacated by Judge Robin S. Rosenbaum when she was elevated to the U.S. Court of Appeals for the Eleventh Circuit. Barzee Flores was recommended for the judgeship by Florida Senators Marco Rubio and Bill Nelson, after she was vetted by the Florida Federal Judicial Nominating Commission, a body appointed by Rubio and Nelson. Rubio blocked Barzee Flores' nomination from being considered by the Senate Judiciary Committee, however. Her nomination expired on January 3, 2017, with the end of the 114th Congress.

== 2018 U.S. House campaign ==
In July 2017, Barzee Flores announced she would run in the Democratic primary for Florida's 27th congressional district, being vacated by retiring Republican Ileana Ros-Lehtinen. After several other Democrats joined the field, in May 2018 she switched to run in the neighboring 25th district to challenge incumbent Republican Mario Díaz-Balart.

In the November 2018 general election, Díaz-Balart defeated Barzee Flores by 21 points.
