= Banes, Cuba =

Banes
- Municipality
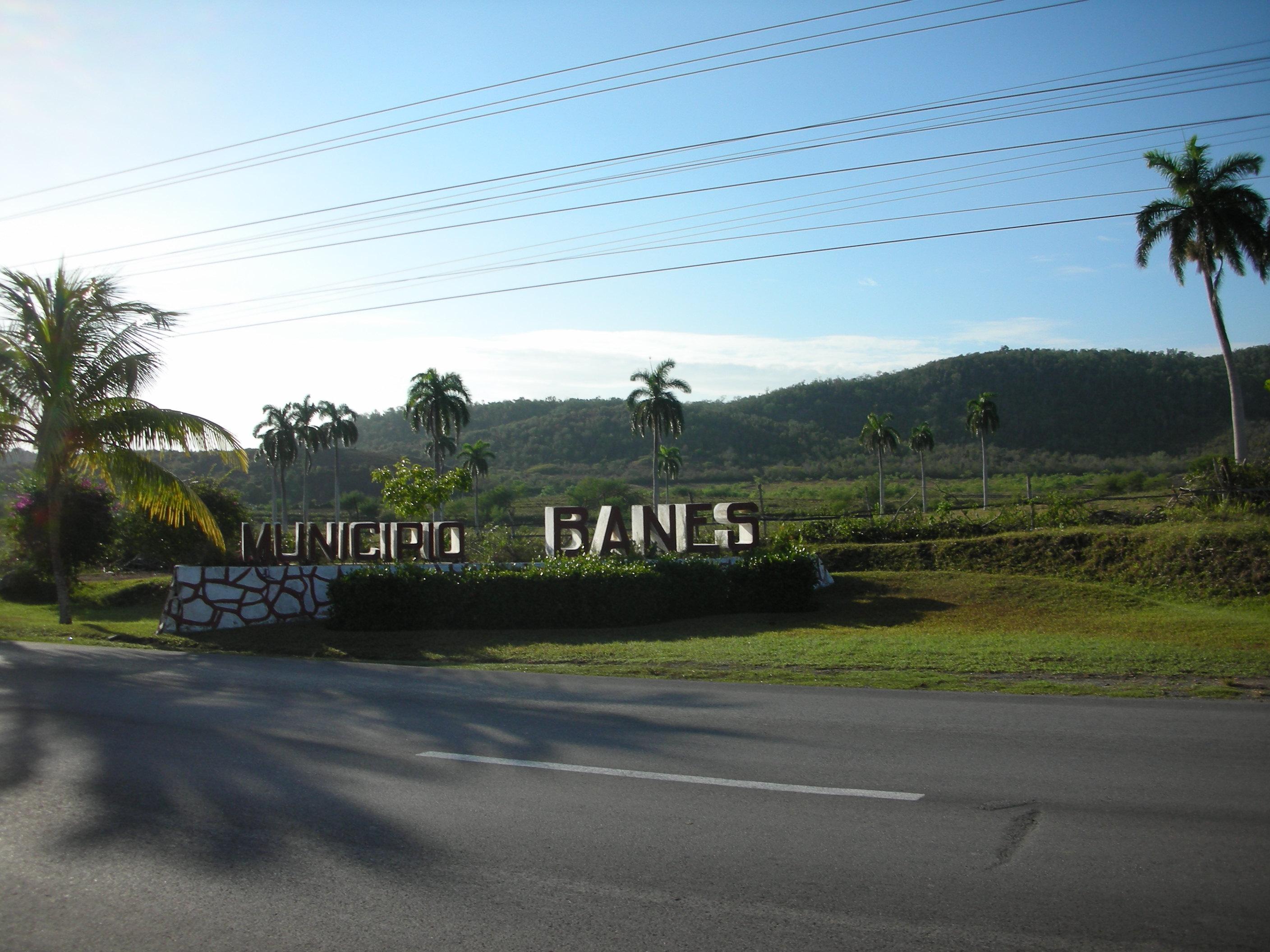

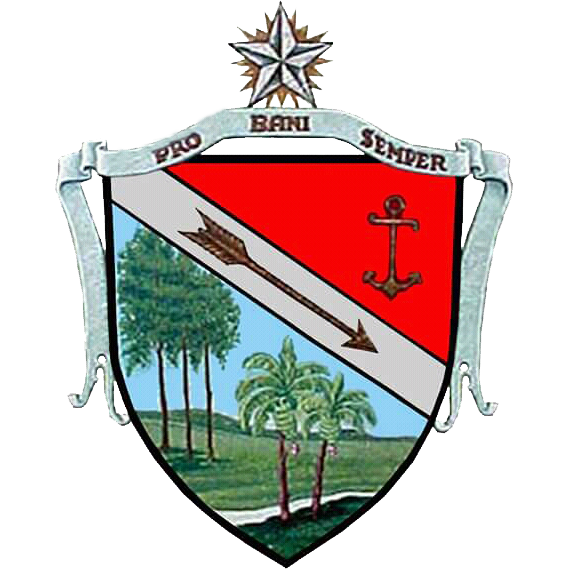
- Coat of arms

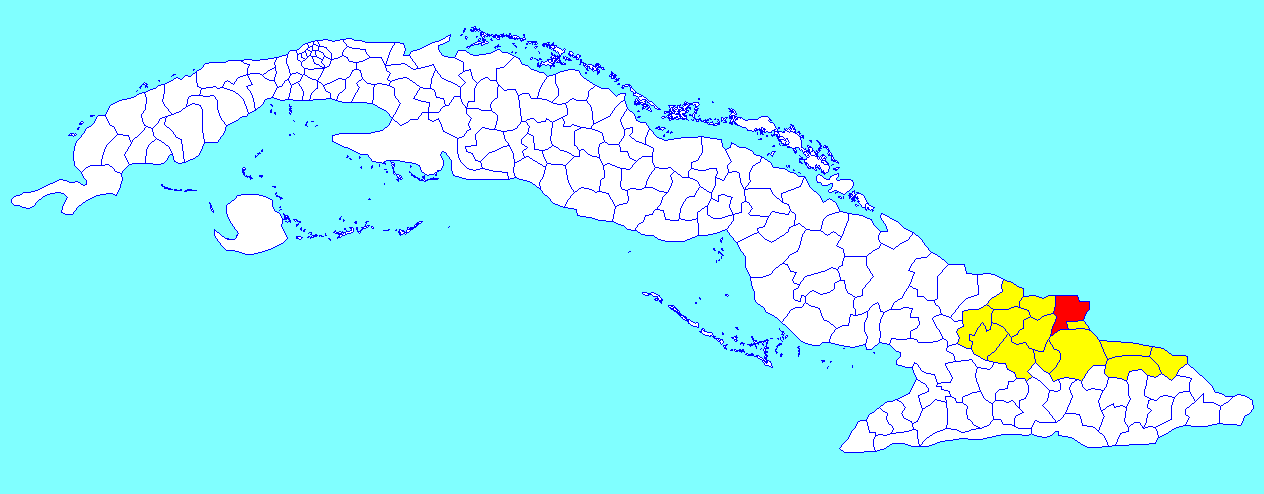
- Banes municipality (red) within Holguín Province (yellow) and Cuba
- Coordinates: 20°58′11″N 75°42′42″W
- Country: Cuba
- Province: Holguín
- Established: 1887

Area
  - Total: 781 km^{2} (302 sq mi)
- Elevation: 100 m (330 ft)

Population (2022)
  - Total: 66,812
  - Density: 85.5/km^{2} (222/sq mi)
- Time zone: UTC-5 (EST)
- Area code: +53-24
- Website: https://www.banes.gob.cu/es/

Banes is a municipality and city in the Holguín Province of Cuba. Banes was an important area for the native Taino people before the conquest by Columbus.

The town of Banes is visited by tourists from Guardalavaca as it is the nearest town to the resort, and both are in the municipality of Banes. A museum featuring the Taino culture is situated halfway between both towns.

== History ==
The name comes from the inhabitants Taino language word Bani, meaning "valley".

Hurricane Ike made landfall here as a Category 4 hurricane on the evening of September 7, 2008, causing great losses of property.

Before the creation of consejos populares, the municipality was divided into the barrios of Barrio Amarillo, Angeles, Berros, Cañadón, Durruthy, Este, Flores, Macabi, Mulas, Nuevo Banes, Oeste, Retrete, Río Seco, Samá (includes Guardalavaca), Marcané, Veguitas and Yaguajay.

== Demographics ==
In 2022, the municipality of Banes had a population of 66,812. With a total area of 781 km^{2} (302 sq mi), it has a population density of 86/km^{2} (220/sq mi).

== Personalities ==
- Fulgencio Batista (1901–1973), politician
- Victor Brown (?–2016), musician
- Rafael Díaz-Balart (1926–2005), politician
- Rafael José Díaz-Balart (1899–1985), politician
- Waldo Díaz-Balart (1931–2025), painter
- Julio González (1920–1991), baseball player
- Peruchín (1913–1977), pianist
- Gilberto Zaldívar (1934–2009), Cuban-American theatre director
- Liuba Zaldívar, Cuban-Ecuadorian triple jumper was born here in 1993

== See also ==
- Municipalities of Cuba
- List of cities in Cuba
