= Rafael Díaz-Balart =

Cuban politician (1926–2005)

- Born: Rafael Lincoln Díaz-Balart y Gutiérrez; January 17, 1926; Banes, Cuba
- Died: May 6, 2005 (aged 79); Key Biscayne, Florida
- Spouse: Hilda Caballero Brunet
- Children: Lincoln; José; Mario; Rafael
- Parent(s): Rafael José Díaz-Balart; América Gutiérrez
- Relatives: Mirta Diaz-Balart (sister); Waldo Díaz-Balart (brother)

Rafael Lincoln Díaz-Balart y Gutiérrez (January 17, 1926 – May 6, 2005) was a Cuban attorney and politician. In the 1950s, Díaz-Balart served as Under Secretary of Interior during the dictatorship of Fulgencio Batista and Majority Leader in the Batista-controlled Cuban House of Representatives prior to the Cuban Revolution.

== Biography ==
Born in Banes, Díaz-Balart was the son of the mayor of Banes, Rafael José Díaz-Balart. In 1955, Díaz-Balart gave a speech before the Cuban House of Representatives in opposition to the amnesty granted to his former brother-in-law, Fidel Castro, for his involvement in the 1953 attack on the Moncada Barracks (disputed). Díaz-Balart was elected senator in 1958, but was unable to take office due to Fidel Castro's rise to power on January 1, 1959.

Díaz-Balart founded La Rosa Blanca (The White Rose), the first anti-Castro organization, in Miami, United States, in January 1959. He is the father of U.S. Congressmen Lincoln Díaz-Balart and Mario Díaz-Balart, TV news journalist José Díaz-Balart, and investment banker Rafael Díaz-Balart. He is the brother of Mirta Díaz-Balart, Fidel Castro's first wife. His brother, Waldo Díaz-Balart was a painter and a former actor who appeared in two movies by Andy Warhol in the 1960s. His father, Rafael Jose Díaz-Balart was elected to the Cuban House of Representatives in 1936 and his brother-in-law, Juan Caballero, was elected to the Cuban House of Representatives in 1954.

Following his departure from Cuba, Rafael Diaz-Balart spent some years living in Spain. He worked there as an insurance company executive with Ibérica de Seguros La Providence. This company had investments in real estate companies which developed property on the Spanish Riviera. He then also spent several years serving as a diplomat for the government of Costa Rica in Venezuela and Paraguay.

Díaz-Balart died on May 6, 2005, in his Key Biscayne, Florida, home after a battle with leukemia.

The building that houses the Florida International University College of Law was named in honor of his father, Rafael José Díaz-Balart.

== Bibliography ==
- 50th anniversary of the jail assault that established Castro
- "Father of two Florida congressmen dies at 79". The Gainesville Sun. Associated Press. 2005-05-07. p. 2B.
- Congressional Testimony of Rafael Diaz-Balart, May 3, 1960
