= Waldo Díaz-Balart =

Cuban painter and sculptor (1931–2025)

- Born: 10 February 1931; Banes, Cuba
- Died: 5 February 2025 (aged 93); Madrid, Spain
- Occupations: Painter; sculptor
- Father: Rafael José Díaz-Balart
- Relatives: Díaz-Balart family

Waldo Díaz-Balart y Gutiérrez (10 February 1931 – 5 February 2025) was a Cuban painter and sculptor who later lived in Madrid, Spain.

== Life and career ==
Born in Banes, Cuba, Díaz-Balart was the son of the mayor of Banes, Rafael José Díaz-Balart. Díaz-Balart studied accounting, political science and economics in Havana before moving to New York City to pursue art studies in 1959. From 1959 to 1962 he studied art in the Museum of Modern Art, New York. In 1967 he became a lecturer in many cultural centres and universities of the United States, Poland, Spain, Germany, and the Netherlands. He acted in two movies by Andy Warhol, The Life of Juanita Castro (1965) and The Loves of Ondine (1968). He was friends with fellow artist Andy Warhol and actor Louis Waldon.

Díaz-Balart lectured frequently and his work – explorations of color and light in geometric paintings and light sculpture – has been widely exhibited. In 1966 the Studio Gallery in Washington, D.C., presented a solo exhibition of his work. In 1967 he presented an exhibition at the Iris Clert Gallery in Paris. In 1967 he joined Mass Art Inc. in partnership with Sujan Souri, Dorian Godoy, and Philip Orenstein. The company manufactured the first inflatable chair designed by Philip Orenstein which is now included in the permanent collection of the Metropolitan Museum of Art in New York. In 1964, he exhibited in the Pan American Union Building in Washington, D.C., and in 1968 in the Gallery of Modern Art, New York. In 1970, he participated at the first San Juan Bienal del Grabado Latinoamericano (Biennial of Latin-American Engraving) at the Institute of Puerto Rican Culture in Puerto Rico.

He had his first major exhibition in 1972, at the Museo de Arte Contemporáneo.

In 1979, he participated in the Third Bienal Internacional del Deporte en las Bellas Artes (Biennial of Sport in Fine Arts) in Barcelona, and in 1995 he participated in the international art fair Art Cologne in Germany. In 1998 he showed "Waldo Balart. Black Painting" in Galería Edurne in Madrid.

He had one-man shows in the Netherlands and in Spain. He is the recipient of a Pollock-Krasner Foundation fellowship. His work is in the permanent collections of the Museum of Modern Art in New York, the Museo Nacional Centro de Arte Reina Sofía in Madrid, the Mondriaan House in Amersfoort, The Netherlands, and the Museum of Modern Art in Hünfeld, Germany, among others.

In 1992 he published the book Ensayos de Arte (Essays on Art).

In 1999, he moved from Spain to Liège, Belgium. He later returned to Madrid before 2011. He also briefly lived in Paraguay.

In 2002, he was honoured as a Frost Art Museum of Florida International University fellow.

Represented by the Madrid gallery Casado Santapau.

The marriage of his sister, Mirta Díaz-Balart, to Cuban leader Fidel Castro as Castro's first wife made Waldo Díaz-Balart Castro's brother-in-law. His nephews include U.S. congressman Mario Díaz-Balart, the late U.S. congressman Lincoln Díaz-Balart, and NBC Nightly News Saturday news anchor José Díaz-Balart.

Díaz-Balart died in Madrid on 5 February 2025, at the age of 93.
