= Rafael José Díaz-Balart =

Cuban politician (c. 1899–1985)

Rafael José Díaz-Balart (c. 1899 – 1985) was a Cuban politician and mayor of the town of Banes. With his wife América Gutiérrez, he was the father of Rafael Lincoln Díaz-Balart and progenitor of the Díaz-Balart family, an American political family. He was briefly the father-in-law of Fidel Castro through Castro's marriage to Díaz-Balart's daughter, Mirta Diaz-Balart, but after the Cuban Revolution, he became a major anti-Castro figure living in exile in Miami, Florida.

== Biography ==
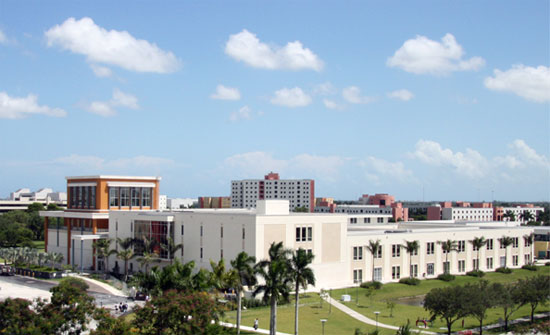
Rafael Díaz-Balart Hall, building of the Florida International University College of Law, named for Rafael José Díaz-Balart.

Born in Santiago de Cuba, Díaz-Balart received a law degree from the University of Havana in 1919. Soon after joining the Bar, he became a municipal judge in the city of Palma Soriano, where he served for four years until, by civil service examination, he obtained the post of civil law notary in the town of Banes in eastern Cuba. While maintaining his law practice he was elected City Council President and Mayor of Banes. He was elected to the Cuban House of Representatives and transferred his law practice first to the city of Holguín, then to Havana. There, he founded the law firm of Diaz-Balart, Diaz-Balart and Amador, with his son, Rafael Lincoln, and partner Rolando Amador. After several years, Díaz-Balart assumed the post of Land Registrar, also by examination. From 1952 to 1953, Díaz-Balart was Undersecretary of Transportation in the cabinet of Fulgencio Batista and Secretary of Transportation from August 1953 to April 1954.

In 1948, Díaz-Balart's daughter Mirta married Fidel Castro, then a fellow philosophy student at the University of Havana. They divorced in 1955, and in 1959, Castro led the Cuban Revolution, overthrowing the government with which both Díaz-Balart and his son Rafael were affiliated. Díaz-Balart went into exile in Miami, and became a United States citizen. In 1965, Díaz-Balart, along with his son Rafael, entered law school at the University of Madrid in Spain, where he received a second law degree. Díaz-Balart then returned to Miami, Florida, where he remained until his death, in 1985.

The building that houses the Florida International University College of Law bears his name, "Rafael Diaz-Balart Hall", a building designed by Robert A.M. Stern Architects. The United States Congress also passed a resolution on February 7, 2007, detailing Díaz-Balart's contributions and recognizing that the law school building was named in his honor.
