= Mario Díaz-Balart =

American politician (born 1961)

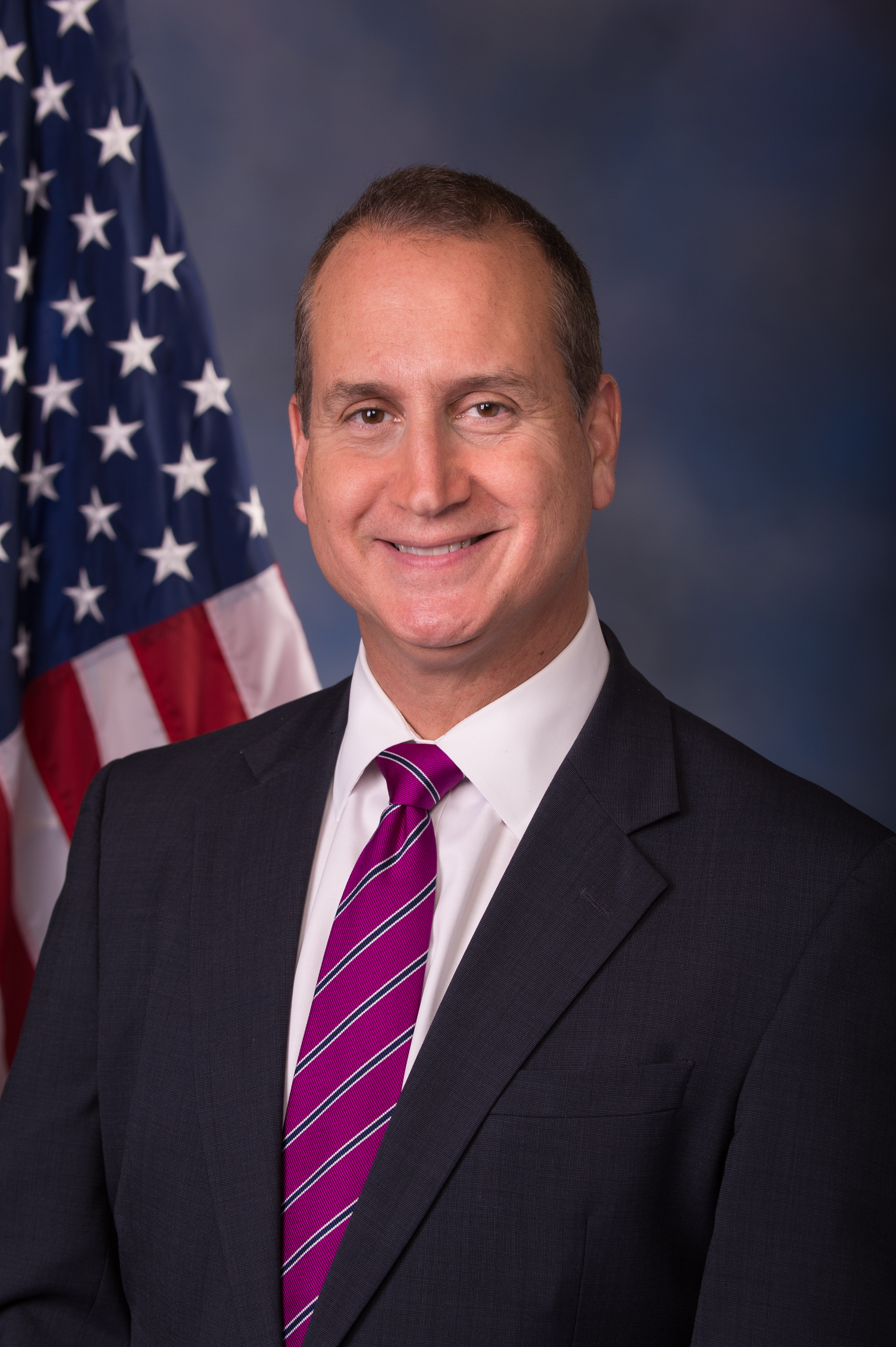
- Official portrait, 2017

Member of the U.S. House of Representatives from Florida
- Incumbent
- Assumed office January 3, 2003
- Preceded by: Constituency established
- Constituency: 25th district (2003–2011); 21st district (2011–2013); 25th district (2013–2023); 26th district (2023–present)

Member of the Florida House of Representatives
- In office November 7, 2000 – November 5, 2002
- Preceded by: J. Alex Villalobos
- Succeeded by: David Rivera (redistricted)
- Constituency: 112th district
- In office November 8, 1988 – November 3, 1992
- Preceded by: Javier Souto
- Succeeded by: Carlos Manrique (redistricted)
- Constituency: 115th district

Member of the Florida Senate from the 37th district
- In office November 3, 1992 – November 7, 2000
- Preceded by: Gwen Margolis (redistricted)
- Succeeded by: J. Alex Villalobos

Personal details
- Born: Mario Rafael Díaz-Balart y Caballero; September 25, 1961 (age 65) Fort Lauderdale, Florida, U.S.
- Party: Republican (1985–present)
- Other political affiliations: Democratic (before 1985)
- Spouse: Tia Díaz-Balart
- Children: 1
- Parent: Rafael Díaz-Balart (father)
- Relatives: Díaz-Balart family
- Education: University of South Florida (BA)
- Website: House website Campaign website
- Díaz-Balart's voice Díaz-Balart condemning Venezuela's Maduro regime. Recorded January 29, 2019

Mario Rafael Díaz-Balart y Caballero (/bəˈlɑːrt/ bə-LART; born September 25, 1961) is an American politician serving as the U.S. representative for Florida's 26th congressional district. A member of the Republican Party, he was elected in 2002, and his district includes much of northwestern Miami-Dade County, including Hialeah, and much of the northern portion of the Everglades.

Díaz-Balart has been the dean of Florida's congressional delegation since April 2021.

== Early life, education, and early political career ==
Díaz-Balart was born in 1961 in Fort Lauderdale, to Cuban parents, the late Cuban politician Rafael Díaz-Balart, and his wife, Hilda Caballero Brunet.

He is a member of the Díaz-Balart family: His aunt, Mirta Díaz-Balart, was the first wife of Cuban president Fidel Castro. Her son, and his cousin, was Fidel Ángel "Fidelito" Castro Díaz-Balart. His uncle was the Cuban-Spanish painter Waldo Díaz-Balart. His brother Lincoln Díaz-Balart represented Florida's 21st District from 1993 to 2011. He has two other brothers, José Díaz-Balart, a journalist, and Rafael Díaz-Balart, a banker.

He studied political science at the University of South Florida before beginning his public service career as an aide to then-Miami Mayor Xavier Suárez in 1985. In the same year, he changed his political party affiliation from Democratic to Republican.

== Florida legislature ==
Díaz-Balart (right) and Miami-Dade County Mayor Alex Penelas (left) meet with local senior citizens in 2000

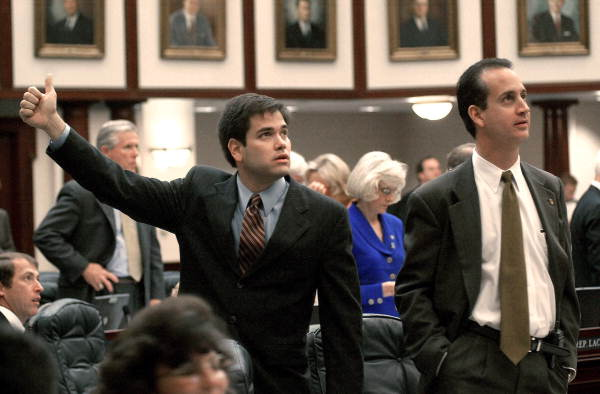
Díaz-Balart and Marco Rubio in 2001

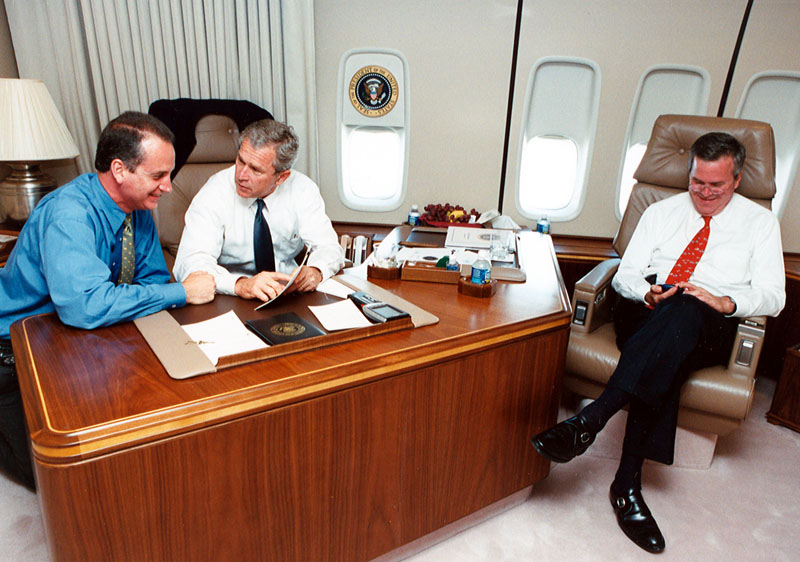
Díaz-Balart with President George W. Bush and Governor Jeb Bush aboard Air Force One in 2004

Díaz-Balart was elected to the Florida House in 1988 and to the Florida Senate in 1992. He returned to the Florida House in 2000.

== U.S. House of Representatives ==
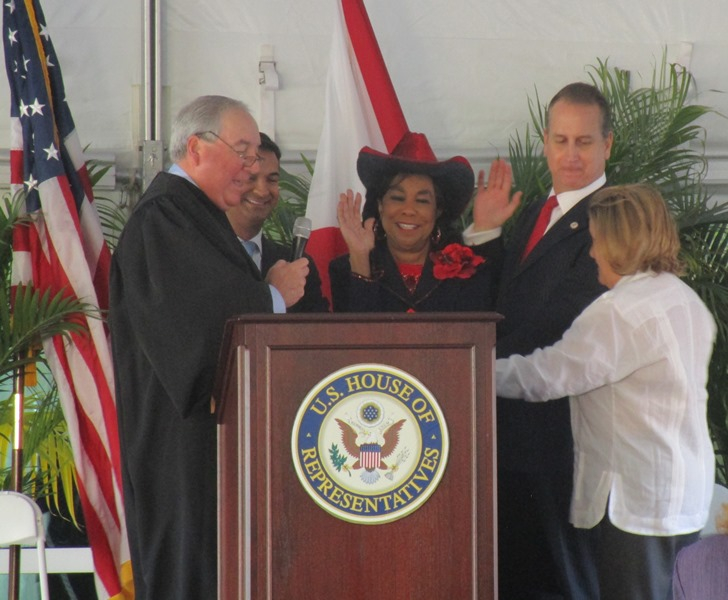
Chief Judge Kevin Michael Moore, swearing in Members of Congress Carlos Curbelo, Frederica Wilson, Mario Díaz-Balart, and Ileana Ros-Lehtinen. (February 2015)

=== Elections ===
2002–2006

Díaz-Balart gave up his seat in the state house to run in the newly created 25th District, which included most of western Miami-Dade County, part of Collier County and the mainland portion of Monroe County. He won with 64% of the vote. He was unopposed for reelection in 2004, and won a third term with 58% of the vote in 2006.

2008

In 2008, Díaz-Balart faced his strongest challenge to date in Joe García, former executive director of the Cuban American National Foundation and former chairman of the Miami-Dade County Democratic Party. Díaz-Balart defeated Garcia with 53% of the vote.

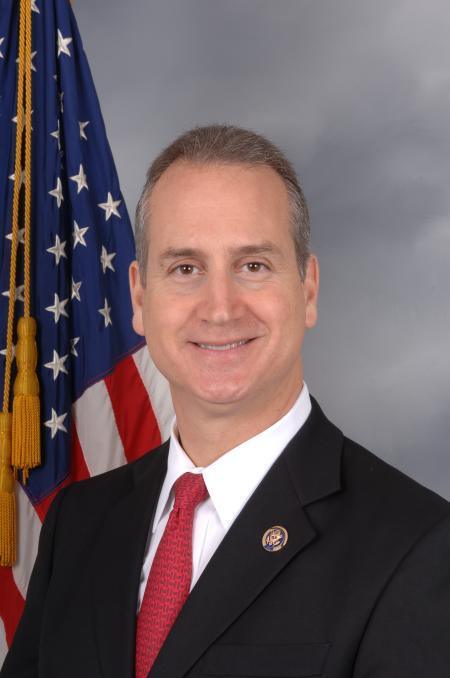
Díaz-Balart official portrait

2010

On February 11, 2010, Díaz-Balart announced his intention to seek election in Florida's 21st congressional district—being vacated by his brother, Lincoln Díaz-Balart—rather than the 25th district. Unlike the 25th, the 21st has long been considered the Miami area's most Republican district. No other party even fielded a candidate when filing closed on April 30, handing Díaz-Balart the seat.

2012

Díaz-Balart was reelected unopposed in 2012 in the renumbered 25th district.

2014

In 2014, Díaz-Balart ran unopposed.

2016

In 2016, Díaz-Balart beat Democrat Alina Valdes, 62.4% to 37.6%. It was only the third time that a Democrat had filed to run in this district, which had been numbered as the 21st from 1993 to 2013.

2018

The Miami Herald reported in April 2018 that Díaz-Balart seemed a shoo-in for reelection in November. Former Hialeah mayor Raúl Martínez, a Democrat who had challenged Lincoln Díaz-Balart in what was the 21st in 2008, said the 25th district "is very hard to win for a Democrat, especially if you're not Hispanic and you don't speak Spanish." Valdes, who had lost to him in 2016, was a candidate in the Democratic primary. In April, Annisa Karim, who is active in the Democratic Party, announced that she too would run in the primary. In May, the Herald reported that Mary Barzee Flores, a former judge who had at first decided to run in the 27th district, had opted instead to run for Díaz-Balart's seat.

In the November 2018 general election, Díaz-Balart defeated Barzee Flores, 60.5% to 39.5%.

=== Committee assignments ===
For the 118th Congress:

- Committee on Appropriations
  - Subcommittee on Defense
  - Subcommittee on State, Foreign Operations, and Related Programs (Chair)
  - Subcommittee on Transportation, Housing and Urban Development, and Related Agencies

=== Caucus memberships ===
- Chair of the Congressional Hispanic Conference
- Founder of the Protecting Families Online Initiative
- Founding member of the Washington Waste Watchers
- Congressional Taiwan Caucus (Co-chair)
- Member of the Congressional Cuba Democracy Caucus
- Republican Main Street Partnership
- House Baltic Caucus
- Republican Governance Group

== Political positions ==
As of January 2018, Díaz-Balart had voted with his party in 92.4% of votes in the 115th United States Congress and voted in line with President Trump's position in 93.1% of votes.

He is a founding member of the Congressional Hispanic Conference, a caucus of Hispanic Republican congressmen.

=== Epstein files ===
During the congressional debate over the Epstein Files Transparency Act, Representative Mario Díaz-Balart (R-FL) publicly expressed support for transparency and justice for victims but was noncommittal about signing the Epstein Files Transparency Act. In a statement on social media ahead of the House vote, Díaz-Balart described the work of the House Committee on Oversight and Reform under Republican leadership as having “released over 65,000 pages of documents, summoned key witnesses, and demanded full transparency from the Department of Justice, while also protecting the victims,” but still called the Epstein Files Transparency Act “flawed”.

Unlike Representatives Ro Khanna and Thomas Massie, who led early bipartisan efforts to force release of the full Epstein files (not just the previously released 65,000 files), Díaz-Balart did not support those actions and was reported as voting with most House Republicans in support of the final bill only after President Trump weighed in.

=== LGBT rights ===
In May 2019, Díaz-Balart voted to prohibit discrimination on the basis of sexual orientation and gender identity in employment, housing, public accommodations, public education, federal funding, credit, and the jury system under the Equality Act. He joined seven other Republicans and 228 Democrats in supporting the legislation, which passed the United States House of Representatives during the 116th Congress.

In February 2021, Díaz-Balart changed his position on the legislation, voting against it during the 117th Congress on the basis that it did not protect individuals or organizations who oppose LGBTQ rights. In a statement released after his vote, he claimed Democrats ignored Republicans' issues with the bill and "doubled down on some of the most troubling issues, including sabotaging religious freedom."

=== Vote Smart issue positions ===
According to Vote Smart's 2016 analysis, Díaz-Balart generally supports pro-life legislation, opposes an income tax increase, opposes mandatory minimum sentences for nonviolent drug offenders, opposes federal spending as a means of promoting economic growth, supports lowering taxes as a means of promoting economic growth, opposes requiring states to adopt federal education standards, supports building the Keystone Pipeline, supports government funding for the development of renewable energy, opposes the federal regulation of greenhouse gas emissions, opposes gun-control legislation, supports repealing the Affordable Care Act, opposes requiring immigrants who are unlawfully present to return to their country of origin before they are eligible for citizenship, opposes same-sex marriage, and supports allowing individuals to divert a portion of their Social Security taxes into personal retirement accounts.

=== Environment ===
In 2007, Díaz-Balart said, "I know there's a lot of money to be made on the bandwagon of global warming. You can make movies, documentaries, get a lot of research money — and that's okay, I love capitalism...My fear is using the bandwagon of global warming to have Congress act on some knee-jerk reaction which will please some editorialists, will hurt our economy, will not do anything to help us in the future."

=== Health care ===
On May 4, 2017, Díaz-Balart voted to repeal the Patient Protection and Affordable Care Act (Obamacare) and pass the American Health Care Act.

=== Donald Trump ===
In February 2017, Díaz-Balart voted against a resolution that would have directed the House to request 10 years of then-President Donald Trump's tax returns, which would then have been reviewed by the House Ways and Means Committee in a closed session.

Díaz-Balart supported Trump's firing of FBI Director James Comey, saying, "It is clear that Director Comey had lost the confidence of the deputy attorney general, attorney general, and the president. Unfortunately, he became a controversial and divisive figure."

In January 2018, after it was reported that Trump had voiced his opposition to immigration from Haiti, El Salvador, and African countries—which he reportedly called "shithole countries"—in a meeting on immigration reform, Díaz-Balart, who attended the meeting, did not say whether the alleged incident took place.

=== Economic issues ===
Díaz-Balart voted to promote free trade with Peru, against assisting workers who lose jobs due to globalization, for the Central America Free Trade Agreement, for the US-Australia Free Trade Agreement, for the US-Singapore free trade agreement, and for free trade with Chile. He was rated 75% by the National Foreign Trade Council, indicating support for trade engagement.

==== Tax reform ====
Díaz-Balart voted for the Tax Cuts and Jobs Act of 2017. The Center for American Progress, a center-left think-tank, estimated that 41,000 of his constituents would lose their health insurance as a result of the bill's passing.

=== Foreign policy ===
Díaz-Balart has strongly supported the right of self-determination on the Falkland Islands, over which there is a sovereignty dispute between Argentina and the United Kingdom. On April 18, 2013, he introduced a House resolution calling on the federal government to officially recognize the result of the 2013 Falkland Islands sovereignty referendum in which the Falkland Islanders overwhelmingly voted to remain a British Overseas Territory. Díaz-Balart introduced a similar resolution in 2017, recognizing the result of that year's general election in the Falklands.

Díaz-Balart supported a July 2025 appropriations bill that would ban funding for the United Nations secretariat and UNRWA, saying that the bill "strengthens national security and supports an America First foreign policy."

==== Cuba ====
In 2007, Díaz-Balart advocated maintaining the Cuban embargo, saying, "Some people do not understand the embargo of Cuba. Its purpose is to keep American hard currency out of the hands of a Communist thug by restricting most trade and travel."

In an April 2015 essay for Time magazine, Díaz-Balart wrote that President Obama "continues to appease brutal dictatorships while gaining precious little in return. He conflates the Cuban dictatorship with the Cuban people when in reality, their interests are diametrically opposed." Díaz-Balart noted that "all eight Cuban-American senators and congressmen from both sides of the aisle strongly disagree" with Obama's policy on Cuba, whose people "want to gather peacefully, speak their minds, practice their faiths, access the Internet, and enjoy the fruits of their labor."

In September 2016, Díaz-Balart praised Republican presidential candidate Donald Trump "for firmly stating his commitment today to reverse President Obama's capitulations to the Castro regime" and contrasted Trump's position to what he called Hillary Clinton's "foolhardy stance". The U.S., he said, needs "a president who once again will stand with the Cuban people instead of emboldening and enriching their oppressors."

In a March 2017 memo to the Trump White House, Díaz-Balart argued that if the Cuban government did not conform to the Helms-Burton law within 90 days, the U.S. should revert to its pre-Obama policy on Cuba.

On January 19, 2023, Diaz-Balart said he supported sanctioning and revoking the visas of members of the Honduran government if the legislative body voted to remove Honduras from CAFTA. He was the first U.S. lawmaker to threaten to revoke the visas of members of Xiomara Castro's government.

==== Colombia ====
President of Colombia, Gustavo Petro, has publicly accused U.S. Congressman Mario Díaz-Balart of participating in conspiracies to overthrow his government. During Petro’s presidency, Díaz-Balart has held several meetings with Colombian right-wing opposition figures, including Álvaro Uribe, Vicky Dávila, and Efraín Cepeda.

In June 2025, the newspaper El País revealed audio recordings related to an alleged conspiracy against President Petro, reportedly led by his former foreign minister, the conservative Álvaro Leyva. In the recordings, Leyva claims to have met with Díaz-Balart, seeking his help to influence Marco Rubio, head of the U.S. Department of State, and the Trump administration in support of a plan to remove Petro from power.

=== Immigration and refugees ===
In 2014, The Washington Post reported that Díaz-Balart was "eagerly seeking a deal" on undocumented immigrants "that can somehow please enough Republicans and Democrats to advance. And that upsets many Democrats and Republicans." After being "involved in bipartisan talks on the issue for years", he was "one of the guys most skilled on the issue" and hence "gets plenty of flack from both sides." Díaz-Balart told the Post that "President Obama said that this was going to be one of his first priorities in his first 12 months", but even when "Democrats controlled everything", nothing got done "because they didn't want to do it."

Díaz-Balart supported Trump's 2017 executive order to impose a temporary ban on entry to the U.S. to citizens of seven Muslim-majority countries, saying, "The ban is only temporary until the administration can review and enact the necessary procedures to vet immigrants from these countries. The ban is based on countries the Obama administration identified as 'countries of concern' and not based on a religious test."

In June 2017, Díaz-Balart was one of three Republicans who voted against the No Sanctuary for Criminals Act, which would have penalized jurisdictions that limit cooperation with federal immigration enforcement and expanded mandatory detention requirements.

In 2021, Díaz-Balart was one of 30 Republicans who voted for the Farm Workforce Modernization Act, which would grant legal status to certain illegal immigrants working in agriculture and establish a pathway to permanent residency contingent on continued farm work.

He took part in a January 2018 White House meeting about DACA, and said that nothing would "divert my focus to stop the deportation of these innocent people whose futures are at stake."

In 2026, Díaz-Balart was a cosponsor of the DIGNIDAD Act, which proposes a pathway to legal status for up to 12 million illegal immigrants, paired with stricter border enforcement and mandatory work and restitution requirements.

=== October 2023 House speaker election ===
In 2023, Díaz-Balart was one of 18 Republicans who voted against Jim Jordan's nomination for Speaker of the House all three times.

=== Gun policy ===
In the aftermath of the Stoneman Douglas High School shooting on February 14, 2018, in Parkland, Florida, Díaz-Balart said gun control legislation would not be effective at stopping mass shootings, saying, "I want to make sure we look at things that could make a difference."

=== Espionage ===
Díaz-Balart took part in a November 2013 meeting between American legislators and the European Parliament's foreign affairs committee about NSA spying on European officials. He told his European counterparts that they should realize that the U.S. is their greatest ally. "Part of re-establishing trust", he said, "is to know who your friends are and treat them accordingly, and to know who your enemies are and treat them accordingly."

=== Infrastructure ===
A 2017 report found that Díaz-Balart had delivered millions to his district for road and highway improvements.

== Personal life ==
Díaz-Balart lives in Miami with his wife, Tia, and their son.

On March 18, 2020, Díaz-Balart announced he had tested positive for COVID-19. He was the first member of Congress to do so. While recovering from the effects of the disease, though still drained from the experience, Diaz-Balart said he would offer his blood plasma, with antibodies against the virus, for experimental treatment or research purposes.

Díaz-Balart is Roman Catholic.

== See also ==
- List of Hispanic and Latino Americans in the United States Congress

U.S. House of Representatives
New constituency	Member of the U.S. House of Representatives from Florida's 25th congressional district 2003–2011	Succeeded by David Rivera
New office	Chair of the Congressional Hispanic Conference; 2003–2005	Succeeded by Ileana Ros-Lehtinen
Preceded by Lincoln Díaz-Balart	Member of the U.S. House of Representatives from Florida's 21st congressional district 2011–2013	Succeeded by Ted Deutch
Preceded by Luis Fortuño	Chair of the Congressional Hispanic Conference; 2009–2025; Served alongside: Tony Gonzales (2023–2025)	Succeeded by Tony Gonzales
Preceded by David Rivera	Member of the U.S. House of Representatives from Florida's 25th congressional district 2013–2023	Succeeded by Debbie Wasserman Schultz
Preceded by Carlos A. Giménez	Member of the U.S. House of Representatives from Florida's 26th congressional district 2023–present	Incumbent
Preceded by Tony Gonzales	Chair of the Congressional Hispanic Conference; 2026–present	Incumbent
U.S. order of precedence (ceremonial)
Preceded by Tom Cole	United States representatives by seniority 39th	Succeeded by Mike Rogers
Preceded by Mike Rogers	Order of precedence of the United States	Succeeded by John Carter
