= Ethnic interest groups in the United States =

Ethnic interest groups in the United States are ethnic interest groups within the United States which seek to influence the foreign policy and, to a lesser extent, the domestic policy of the United States for the benefit of the foreign "ethnic kin" or homeland with whom the respective ethnic groups identify.

== Historic development ==
[The] ethnic composition [of the United States is] the single most important determinant of American foreign policy. — Nathan Glazer

"Being a country founded and populated by immigrants, the United States has always contained groups with significant affective and political ties to their national homeland and their ethnic kin throughout the world."

Many commentators when discussing the influence of ethnic interest groups tend to focus on new entrants to the competition for influence while accepting that the historic role that the Anglo-Saxon ethnic group had is no longer influencing, the foreign policy of the United States. According to the Anglo authors as it usually is it was the United States' Anglo-Saxon's ethnic-ideological identity that, according to Paul McCartney, drove it to enter into the Spanish–American War. Similarly, United States foreign policy in the mid-20th century was shaped in favor of South African apartheid, according to Catherine Scott, as a result of the influence of people who identified with the Afrikaners based on a feeling of shared "whiteness."

=== World War I ===
In the United States, according to Alexander DeConde, the "World War quickened the ethnic consciousness of minority groups. They promptly created organizations to help the causes of their old European homelands that had become belligerents. Through whatever means possible, the ethnic activists among them sought to give direction to Washington on matters of policy that affected their overseas kin, making the United States a lobbying battleground between rival interest groups emotionally entangled in the war."

=== Cold War ===
Ambrosio writes that "during the Cold War, the influence of ethnic identity groups was limited by the nature of both the international system and the U.S. foreign policy process." The ethnic identity groups had limited influence during this period because:

1. the Cold War foreign policy of the United States was formulated largely by elites concentrated in an executive branch (itself insulated from ethnic politicking because of their diminished role in presidential elections as compared to congress), and
2. the general public, because of the high stakes involved, granted significant latitude and deference to the policy making elites.

=== Post–Cold War ===
Historian Samuel P. Huntington writes that in the post–Cold War international system, there is uncertainty and confusion in the United States as to what are its national interests. Contributing to this confusing is the rise of multiculturalism and its eroding of a singular "American identity." The lack of a coherent national identity makes its challenging for the state to articulate its true interests, thus it becomes less resistant to the influence exerted by ethnic interest groups whose ethnocentric goals, at best, may only align with broad "American interests" by chance.

=== Current trends ===
Political scientist Thomas Ambrosio wrote in 2002 that there "has been a growing acceptance that ethnic identity groups have the right to mobilize politically for the purpose of influencing U.S. policies at home and abroad. This has resulted in a rise in the number and ethnic lobbies as well as their influence." Additional trends include an "increasing rejection of cultural assimilation and, in its place, growing support for expressions of ethnic diversity" and a decreasing tendency for Americans "to make charges of disloyalty against those who retain ties to their ethnic kin abroad and who advocate positions in line with the interests of their homeland."

The proliferation of ethnic conflicts has also heightened the stakes for many ethnic groups causing concerted efforts to expand their influence on U.S. foreign policy as the "independence, survival, or general welfare of a group's ethnic kin or homeland is threatened."

== Conflicting interpretations ==
There are multiple perspectives as to the value of the influence of ethnic interest groups on the foreign policy of the United States, much like there are conflicting interpretations of the influence of ethnic interest groups in general, see Ethnic interest groups – conflicting interpretations. Yossi Shain writes that in "many ways […] the participation of ethnic diasporas in shaping U.S. foreign policy is a truly positive phenomena." A less positive assessment comes from Tony Smith, who writes that at "present, the negative consequences of ethnic involvement may way outweigh the undoubted benefits this activism at times confers on America in world affairs."

== Most recognized ethnic interest groups ==
- Albanian American Civic League (Albanian-Americans)
- American Hellenic Institute Public Affairs Committee (Greek-Americans)
- American Indian Movement (Native Americans)
- United States Azerbaijanis Network (Azerbaijani-Americans)
- American Israel Public Affairs Committee (Israeli Americans)
- American Jewish Committee (Jewish-Americans)
- American-Arab Anti-Discrimination Committee (Arab-Americans)
- Ancient Order of Hibernians (Irish-Americans)
- Armenian Assembly of America (Armenian-Americans)
- Armenian National Committee of America (Armenian-Americans)
- Arab American Institute (Arab-Americans)
- Belarusian Congress Committee of America (Belarusian-Americans)
- Cuban-American National Foundation (Cuban-Americans)
- Chinese American Citizens Alliance (Chinese-Americans)
- English-Speaking Union (British-Americans)
- German-American Heritage Foundation of the USA (German-Americans)
- German American National Congress (German-Americans)
- Italian-American Civil Rights League (Italian-Americans)
- Japanese American Citizens League (Japanese-Americans)
- Korean American Coalition (Korean-Americans)
- League of the South (White Southerners of "Anglo-Celtic" origin)
- League of United Latin American Citizens (Hispanic and Latino Americans)
- Mexican American Legal Defense and Educational Fund (Mexican-Americans)
- National Association for the Advancement of Colored People (African Americans)
- National Association of Arab-Americans (Arab-Americans)
- National Congress of American Indians (Native Americans)
- National Italian American Foundation (Italian-Americans)
- OCA - Asian Pacific American Advocates (Asian-Americans)
- Polish American Association (Polish-Americans)
- Polish American Congress (Polish-Americans)
- Polish National Alliance (Polish-Americans)
- Serbian Unity Congress (Serbian Americans)
- Sons of Norway (Norwegian-Americans)
- Sweden-America Foundation (Swedish-Americans)
- TransAfrica (Africans)
- Turkish Coalition of America (Turkish-Americans)
- Ukrainian Congress Committee of America (Ukrainian-Americans)
- Ugandan North American Association (Ugandan Americans)
- United States India Political Action Committee (Indian-Americans)
- UnidosUS/National Council of La Raza (Hispanic and Latino Americans)

== See also ==
- Diaspora politics in the United States
- Ethnic interest group
- Foreign policy interest group
- Identity politics
- List of ethnic interest groups in Canada
