= List of ethnic interest groups in Canada =

This is a list of ethnic interest groups in Canada, often engaged in diaspora politics.

These are advocacy groups in Canada that are established along cultural, ethnic, religious, or racial lines by an ethnic group for the purposes of protecting and advancing the interests of their particular social group either within Canada or abroad—as in the case of foreign policy interest group—through (directly or indirectly) influencing Canadian foreign policy.

This list is organized according to the ethnic divisions used by Statistics Canada.

== African ==
=== Southern and East African ===
- Ugandan Canadian National Association

== Asian ==
=== East and Southeast Asian ===
- Chinese Canadian National Council
- Federation of Korean-Canadian Associations
- Indonesian Canadian Congress
- National Association of Japanese Canadians
- National Council of Canadian-Filipino Associations
- Taiwanese Canadian Association of Toronto
- Vietnamese Canadian Federation

=== South Asian ===
- Canada India Foundation
- Canadian Malayalee Association
- Christian Cultural Association of South Asians
- Federation of Tamil Sangams of North America
- National Association of Canadians of Origins in India
- National Federation of Pakistani Canadians

=== West Central Asian and Middle Eastern ===
- Armenian National Committee of Canada
- Canadian Arab Federation
- Federation of Canadian Turkish Association
- National Council on Canada-Arab Relations

== Caribbean ==
- National Council of Jamaicans and Supportive Organizations in Canada
- National Council of Barbadian Associations in Canada
- National Council of Trinidad and Tobago Organizations in Canada
- Jamaican Canadian Association

== European ==
=== Central European ===
- German Canadian Congress
- German Society of Montreal

=== Eastern European ===
- Belarusan Canadian Coordination Committee
- Canadian Polish Congress
- Czech and Slovak Association of Canada
- Federation of Russian Canadians
- Latvian National Federation of Canada
- Slovak Canadian National Council

==== Ukrainian ====
- Association of United Ukrainian Canadians
- Ukrainian Canadian Congress (umbrella organization)
- Ukrainian Canadian Civil Liberties Association
- Ukrainian Canadian Students' Union
- Ukrainians in Canada for Democratic Ukraine
- Ukrainian National Federation of Canada
- Ukrainian Youth Association

=== Northern European ===
- Federation of Danish Associations in Canada

=== Southern European ===
- Canadian Hispanic Congress
- Canadian Hellenic Congress
- Cypriot Federation of Canada
- National Congress of Italian Canadians
- Portuguese Canadian National Congress
- Serbian National Shield Society of Canada
- Slovenian National Federation of Canada
- United Macedonians Organizations of Canada

== Indigenous ==
- Congress of Aboriginal Peoples

=== First Nations ===
- Assembly of First Nations

=== Inuit ===
- Inuit Tapiriit Kanatami
  - Inuvialuit Regional Corporation
  - Makivik Corporation
  - Government of Nunatsiavut
  - Nunavut Tunngavik Incorporated

=== Métis ===
- Métis National Council

== Jewish ==
- Canadian Jewish Congress
- Canadian Jewish Political Affairs Committee

== See also ==
- Ethnic interest group
- Ethnic interest groups in the United States
