= Diaspora politics in the United States =

Diaspora politics in the United States refers to the political behavior of transnational diasporas of ethnic groups, their relationships with their ethnic homelands and their host states, as well as their role in inter-ethnic relations. This article describes case studies and theories of political scientists studying diaspora politics within the specific context of the United States. The academic field that studies diaspora politics is part of the broader field of diaspora studies.

== Overview ==
To understand a diaspora's politics, one must first understand its historical context and attachments: A diaspora is a transnational community that defines itself as a singular ethnic group based upon its shared identity. Diasporas are created by a forced or induced historical emigration from an original homeland. Diasporas attach great significance to their homelands due to their long history and deep cultural association. The importance of a homeland, especially if it has been lost, can lead to the establishment of an ethnic nationalist movement within the diaspora, which, with time, can eventually result in the homeland's reestablishment. However, even in cases of success, if homelands are reestablished, it is relatively rare for the complete diaspora population to emigrate back to their land of origin, leaving a remaining diaspora community which often retains significant emotional attachment to its foreign kin and homeland.

Writers and academics Yossi Shain and Tamara Cofman Wittes argue that formations of politically active ethnic diaspora communities are "inevitable" and "endemic" features of the international system. They give the following reasons:

1. First, within each of a diaspora's host states, resident members can establish contacts with the citizens of their homeland and cooperate with them in an organized manner to maximize their political leverage.
2. Second, a diaspora can exert significant pressure in its homeland's domestic political arena regarding the issues of concern of the diaspora community.
3. Lately, a diaspora's transnational community can engage directly with third-party states and international organizations, effectively avoiding becoming limited to contacts with their homeland and host state governments exclusively.

Thus, Shain and Wittes state that diasporas are best understood as transnational political entities, operating on "behalf of their entire people", and capable of acting independently from any individual state (be it their homeland or host states).

== Political spheres ==
Diasporas are politically active in three separate realms: their influence on their homeland's domestic politics as outsiders, the exercise of their domestic political rights within their host states, and their independent involvement at the international level.

=== Homeland ===
==== Significance to the diaspora identity ====
While all transnational diasporas retain objective components of a coherent ethnic identity, such as a shared history and folkways, including food and music, in some cases, diasporas can share the objective reality of a territorial homeland. When these ethnic homelands exist, they serve as "the physical embodiment", "a territorial, cultural, and social focus for the ethnic identity of the diaspora community." Moreover, Shain writes:

"In the homeland, the community's language is the language of daily interaction, and all the symbols of sovereignty - currency, stamps, military awards or decorations, flags, insignias, and similar objects - are ingredients that reinforce the identity of the diaspora kin in ways similar to their functions in cultivating and sustaining the national identity of the homeland's citizens."

Thus, from the perspective of the diaspora, the homeland's "political and territorial fate has profound implications."

==== Negotiating the national interest ====
In international relations, it is commonly assumed that a sovereign and independent country, in contemplation of manoeuvring coherently and decisively in the geopolitical system, needs to precisely identify what is commonly referred to as "national interests", its goals and ambitions in the economic, military, or cultural domains. The formulation of policy, both domestic and international, is then straightforward, it is simply the pursuit of the nation's identified national interest.

The national interest of a state usually derived from its closely linked national identity and national narrative. For ethnic homelands with diasporas, there is conflict between the national identity of the homeland and the diaspora's ethnic identity — most obvious is the state's principal concern for only the people living within its boundaries, while the diaspora's is more broadly concerned for the transnational community.

While the homeland is capable of independently formulating and defending its national identity, narratives, and interests, it is usually also highly motivated to accommodate, or at least appear to, the concerns of its ethnic diaspora because of "the diaspora's political clout and financial assistance, at home and internationally." Thus, the homeland's formulations must accommodate the ethnic identity needs of the diaspora to allow for the homeland to retain its significance to them and thus their support.

Shain describes the negotiation process as:

"Although national identity can be negotiated between homeland and diaspora, the structure of modern international relations grants the prerogative of constituting, elaborating, and implementing the national interest to the government of the homeland state. [...] [In] reality, neither the diaspora nor the homeland community ultimately dominates in constitute and communicating national identity. [...] The degree to which the one influences the other is associated with the relative strength that the homeland and the diaspora can exercise vis-à-vis one another through monetary flows, cultural productions, community leadership, and the like."

The conflict between the homeland's national identity and the diaspora's ethnic identity often results in the diaspora emphasizing different aspects of the national narrative, allowing the diaspora to embrace a slightly different interpretation of the homeland's national interest than that held by the homeland's citizens. "A certain degree of flexibility can be preserved because of the distance between homeland and diaspora: each can, to a degree, put its own 'spin' on the national narrative and live out its shared identity in its own way." "Sufficient areas of overlap exist that homeland-diaspora ties can be quite close despite differences of emphasis in the national narrative."

==== Domestic activism ====
Some diasporas have become significant players in the domestic circles of their homelands, according to Shain and Wittes. Diasporas are vocal in their declarations of support for elected homeland politicians or in voicing their belief that certain politicians in their homeland may be "betraying the national causes" as they perceive it. There have been mass demonstrations of support or opposition by diaspora communities in response to specific policy decisions by their homeland governments. In addition, diasporas have targeted domestic public opinion in their homelands and their domestic political development via the use of "monetary contributions, affiliated political parties, and transnational communal organizations."

=== Host states ===
Diaspora communities can both influence the governments and public of their host countries, as well as have their social and political status in a host country affected by the policies of their homeland authorities.

==== Lobbying for ethnic interests ====
According to Thomas Ambrosio, "like other societal interest groups, ethnic identity groups establish formal organizations devoted to promoting group cohesiveness and addressing group concerns." While many formal organizations established by ethnic identity groups are apolitical, others are created explicitly for political purposes. In general, groups that seek to influence government policy on domestic or foreign issues are referred to as lobby groups or "interest groups." Those groups established by ethnic identity groups are referred to as ethnic interest groups.

Homeland authorities can enlist diaspora communities to lobby their respective host governments on behalf of the homeland.

==== Potential liabilities ====
These issues can result in real danger to the local diaspora community. May lead to racism directed towards the diaspora community, either directly or by being co-opted by opportunist extremists. Diaspora communities are almost always minorities in their host states, and thus are at risk of xenophobia or persecution by other demographic groups in the host state.

===== Domestic accountability for foreign kin actions =====
Shain explains that "[when] kin states violate norms that are valued by the host state (such as, for Americans, democracy or human rights), diasporas are often implicated or held accountable morally and politically. [...] The [host state] government and perhaps even [its] public may expect diaspora leaders to persuade or pressure their homeland government to alter its policies in a more congenial direction," and the failure of the diaspora community to act as desired by the host state "can impinge on the diaspora's ability to achieve cherished political goals."

Shain cites the situation of Arab-Americans as an example where diaspora members are held accountable and negatively impacted by the policies of foreign ethnic kin:

"The violence sponsored by the Palestinian nationalist movement over many years, and the Arab countries' endorsement of that violence, severely hampered the ability of Arab-Americans generally (and Palestinian-Americans more particularly) to integrate themselves into American electoral politics. In 1999, a prominent Arab-American was removed from a government-convened panel examining U.S. counter-terrorism policy because of (perhaps prejudicially rooted) concerns about his attitude towards Arab terrorism against Israeli and American targets."

===== Conflicting loyalties =====
Diaspora leaders can be presented with a dilemma of dual loyalties when the interests of their homeland come into conflict with those of their host state. This is most common, according to Shain, when the homeland is involved in a violent conflict or in negotiations to resolve such a conflict.

Shain describes one example:

"[When] the Bush administration in 1991 threatened to withhold loan guarantees to Israel unless Israel agreed not to spend the money in the occupied West Bank and Gaza, Jewish-American advocacy organizations were forced to choose between their good relations with the U.S. foreign policy establishment and their loyal support of Israeli policies in its conflict with the Palestinians. Most chose to support Israeli policy at the cost of incurring the wrath of their American partners. But after the bilateral United States-Israel confrontation was resolved and the loan guarantees were put into place, the majority of those same organizations joined the effort to pressure the Israeli government to adopt a different attitude toward settlement activity in the West Bank and Gaza."

=== International ===
A diaspora's transnational community can engage directly with third-party states and international organizations, in effect bypassing its homeland and host state governments.

==== Bilateral relations ====
Diasporas have, in addition to their domestic political involvement in the homeland and host states, also directly influenced the bilateral international relations of states of concern. In some cases, diasporas have appeared to "bypass" their own homeland's traditional sovereignty over its own international relations via "privately funded activities, and by lobbying governments" of the diaspora host states as well as those of third-party states. Shain and Wittes cite the following as examples of international relations involvement:

- "[The] Armenian-American lobbying groups successfully passed a congressional ban on U.S. aid to Azerbaijan (known as Section 907 of the Freedom Support Act) that has withstood many years of White House efforts to have it overturned."
- "Jewish-American lobbying organizations have pressed for the United States to move its embassy in Israel from Tel Aviv to Jerusalem, against the wishes of the U.S. administration and often those of the Israeli government as well."
- "[The] American Jewish Committee and B'nai B'rith both dedicated significant lobbying efforts to encourage newly independent post-Soviet states to establish diplomatic relations with Israel."

==== Foreign cultivation of diaspora influence ====
In some cases, foreign governments, in hopes of currying favor from distant diaspora communities believed to wield valuable political influence in their host countries, have dispensed generous benefits to local diaspora kin or improved relations with the diaspora's homeland.

Shain describes the Azerbaijan government's persistent frustration with the influence of the Armenian-American lobby in Washington and the lack of a viable Azerbaijani-American diaspora population to counter the Armenian's domestic presence. The Azerbaijani response has been to cultivate Jewish organizations in Washington as their counterbalancing allies to the Armenian-American opposition. The Azerbaijani ambassador to the United States described his efforts:

"We understood that we needed to make friends in this country. We know how strong Jewish groups are. They have asked us about the conditions of Jews in our country. I helped them go to Azerbaijan and open Jewish schools. They came back with [a] good understanding [of the conflict]."

Later, the son of the Azerbaijani ambassador was quoted: "We now have a lobby in the United States and that is the Jewish community."

== Involvement with homeland conflicts ==
=== Dissident advocacy of homeland issues ===
Diaspora communities, particularly those predominantly composed of dissidents of the homeland authorities, can put significant effort towards undermining the homeland regime, going as far as to advocate or instigate domestic coups. There were segments of Iraqi-Americans who advocated strongly for the 2003 invasion of Iraq, segments of the Iranian-American population have similarly advocated for a regime change in Iran since the fall of the Shah, the Vietnamese American calls for democracy and religious freedom in Vietnam, while the most prominent have been the consistent and vocal calls for ending Fidel Castro's communist regime in Cuba by the Florida-based Cuban-American lobby.

Dhananjayan Sriskandarajah writes in reference to the Tamil diaspora that:

In the relatively permissive environment of Western host societies, Tamil diaspora associations have articulated Tamil grievances, something that many argued was not possible because of repression in Sri Lanka (see, e.g., Ilankai Tamil Sangam, n.d.). This activism stands in contrast to the marked lack of participation by Tamils in contemporary Sri Lankan civil society and the impossibility of gauging the views of northeastern Tamils during the conflict. Tamil diaspora activists claim to fill this gap, especially as it is illegal to articulate a Tamil secessionist position in Sri Lanka.

=== Mobilization in response to outside threats ===
When a homeland is threatened by another country, Shain writes, "the threat to a community's survival that the conflict represents can serve as an important mobilizing force for diasporic communities, enabling them to build institutions, raise funds, and promote activism among community members who might otherwise allow for their ethnic identity to fade to the level of mere 'folkways' [...] thus [playing] an important role in the diaspora community's ability to maintain and nourish its own ethnic identity."

==== Military aid ====
Military aid from diasporas to their homelands can be vital in period of violent conflict. Military aid offered by a diaspora, according to Shain, can varying from fundraising in support of military purchases, directly supplying weapons, or serving "as a source of recruits."

Shain cites the example of the military fundraising of the Eritrean and Ethiopian diaspora communities in the United States in response to the 1998-2000 Eritrean-Ethiopian War, the eventual result of which was hundreds of millions of dollars in arm purchases by their respective homelands. Shain quotes from the account of Jesse Driscoll of Georgetown University:

"The energy and organization of the Eritrean diaspora, however, was simply overpowering... With none of the credibility baggage of the [ruling regime in Ethiopia], Eritrea called upon its wealthy and energetic... diaspora.... The fundraising efforts of President Isaias Afewerki in the United States have reached legendary status among those who following the conflict."

==== Public relations ====
Diasporas, according to Shain and Wittes, can be "propagandists" for their homelands.

=== Peace negotiations ===
While in times of severe threat to the homeland, a diaspora suppresses its differences, once there is potential for peace, the conflict between the diaspora's ethnic interests and its homeland's national interests reemerge. In situations, where peaceful resolutions involve the homeland renouncing claims to historically meaningful territory, the preeminence in the diaspora's ethnic identity of the homeland's territory, which contrasts sharply with pragmatic valuations made by the homeland, can cause significant and deeply emotional debates and potential multi-level political battles.

Shain gives this description of the potential for diaspora-homeland conflict over potential territorial compromises:

"[Consider] a state that gives up its claim to a piece of historically significant territory in order to achieve peaceful relations with a neighboring state. Diaspora and homeland citizens often have different attitudes towards the implications such policies have for ethnic and national identity. For many homeland citizens, territory services multiple functions: it provides sustenance, living space and security, as well as a geographic focus for national identity. If giving up a certain territory, even one of significant symbolic value, would increase security and living conditions, a homeland citizen might find the trade-off worthwhile. By contrast, for the diaspora, the security of the homeland is of course important as well; but the territory's identity function is paramount. Its practical value (and indeed the practical value of peace with a formal rival) is not directly relevant to the diaspora's daily experience. In such situations, altering the geographic configuration of the homeland state for the sake of peace may be far more disturbing to the diaspora elements than to segments of the homeland community."

Again, while the leaders and public of the homeland may feel that their national interests trump those of the remote diaspora, the situation is complicated by the homeland's reliance on diaspora's political clout and financial assistance. Such situations lead to the diaspora feeling threatened by actions of the homeland, which to the homeland are viewed as necessary, and if blocked by the diaspora result in harm to the nation's security.

==== Negotiations as a "three-level game" ====
Because of the potential of conflict between the homeland's national interests and the diasporas ethnic interests, and the ability of the diaspora to act independently as a deal-breaker when it feels its interests are at stake, Yossi Shain and Tamara Wittes argue for explicitly including the involved diaspora communities in any peace negotiations.

Specifically, Shain and Wittes argue that the standard "two-level game" model for international peacemaking is inadequate for conflicts complicated by politically active diaspora. The original "two-level game" model, introduced in 1988 by Robert Putnam, recognizes only two levels of stakeholders as being relevant to a successful outcome, the domestic political constituencies of each state and each state's foreign negotiating counterparts. The solution, Shain advocates, is simply to expand the model from a "two-level game" to a "three-level game" in which political active diasporas are recognized as distinct and equally important stakeholders in the negotiation process.

=== Post-conflict demobilization ===
Just as a threat to a homeland can mobilize a diaspora to organize, collect funds, and seek political influence, the peaceful end of a conflict, can consequently lead to a parallel demobilization in the community. The demobilization can be more disruptive for diaspora communities who have become deeply involved in their long-running homeland struggles.

Additionally, in the midst of a conflict, the diaspora community's status can be significantly elevated, both by the attention of the host state's foreign policy establishment seeking influence on the diaspora's homeland, and by the attention of homeland's leaders seeking influence in the diaspora's host states. After the transition to peace, Shain writes, "[the] high-level meetings and phone calls may recede and diasporic community leaders find that internal communal prestige and their external levers of influence both degrade as a result."

Shain hypothesizes:

"If the Arab-Israeli conflict is resolved peacefully, for example, the AIPAC [American Israel Public Affairs Committee] is likely to see its mission greatly diminished, along with its membership, its funding, and its level of attention from elected officials in Washington."

== Politically active diaspora in the United States ==
Modern politically active diasporas
| Ethnic group | Diaspora | Homeland (est.) | Nationalist movement | Domestic lobby | Concerns |
|---|---|---|---|---|---|
| African Americans | African diaspora | Africa | various | African-American lobby in foreign policy | Ending apartheid in South Africa, foreign aid to Africa, support for independence of colonized African lands |
| Armenian Americans | Armenian diaspora | Armenia (1991) | Armenian nationalism | Armenian American lobby, ANCA, Armenian Assembly of America, Armenian American Political Action Committee | Anti-communism, Nagorno-Karabakh, Armenian genocide, Recognition as a major US ethnic group |
| Arab Americans | Arab diaspora | Arab world | Arab nationalism, Pan-Arabism, etc. | Arab American Institute, American Arab Anti-Discrimination Committee, American Task Force on Palestine | Arab–Israeli conflict, 2003 invasion of Iraq, ethnic and cultural discrimination |
| Azerbaijani Americans | Azerbaijani diaspora | Whole Azerbaijan | Azerbaijani nationalism | United States Azerbaijanis Network, U.S.-Azerbaijan Chamber of Commerce, Azerbaijan America Alliance | Nagorno-Karabakh conflict, March days, Khojaly massacre, Armenian–Azerbaijani War, Black January, etc. |
| Belarusian Americans | Belarusian diaspora | Belarus | Belarusian nationalism | Belarusan-American Association, Belarusian Congress Committee of America, Rada of the Belarusian Democratic Republic | Anti-communism, Opposition to Alexander Lukashenko |
| Chinese Americans | Chinese diaspora | China | various | China lobby, Asian Americans Advancing Justice, Asian American Political Alliance, American Citizens for Justice, Qiao Collective | Anti-Asian racism in the United States, China-Taiwan dispute, Asian American activism, Marxism Leninism, Asian anti-imperialism, Asian anti-war movement, Chinese anti-Americanism, Asian American New Left, Chinese nationalism, Chinatown politics |
| Croatian Americans | Croatian diaspora | Croatia | Croatian nationalism | Croatian World Congress | Croatian independence, Croat entity in Bosnia and Herzegovina, Anti−communism |
| Cuban Americans | Cuban exile | Cuba | | Cuban-American lobby | Anti-communism, Opposition to Fidel Castro, U.S. embargo against Cuba, Status of Cuban political refugees legally entering the U.S. |
| Greek Americans | Greek diaspora | Greece (1829) | | AHEPA, American Hellenic Institute | Aegean dispute, Cyprus dispute, Macedonia naming dispute, Greek genocide |
| Indian Americans | Indian diaspora | India | Indian nationalism | United States India Political Action Committee | Legal immigration, counter-terrorism, religious freedom, and US-India trade |
| Iranian Americans | Iranian diaspora | Iran | | Organization of Iranian American Communities | Opposition to the regime of Ali Khamenei |
| Irish Americans | Irish diaspora | Ireland (1920) | Irish nationalism | Irish American lobby | United Ireland, Northern Ireland, Economic links, Undocumented immigration issue |
| Italian Americans | Italian diaspora | Italy (1861) | | National Italian American Foundation, National Association of Italian Americans, Sons of Italy | Risen influence in US political life, concerns of organized crime, cultural integrity of Italians and Sicilians, fighting negative ethnic stereotypes |
| American Jews | Jewish diaspora | Israel (1948) | Zionism | Israel lobby in the United States | Zionism, Arab–Israeli conflict, Antisemitism, The Holocaust, exile of Jews, Jewish refugees, pogroms |
| Mexican Americans | Mexican diaspora | Mexico (historic) | Chicano nationalism | Chicano Movement, Mexican American Legal Defense and Education Fund | Illegal Immigration Rights, socioeconomics, bilingualism |
| American Muslims | various | Muslim world | various | CAIR | War on terrorism, Islamophobia |
| Macedonian Americans | Macedonian diaspora | North Macedonia | | United Macedonian Diaspora | Anti-communism, Macedonia naming dispute, NATO, civil rights for Macedonians in Albania, Bulgaria, Greece, Serbia, and Kosovo, territorial integrity |
| Pakistani Americans | Pakistani diaspora | Pakistan (1947) | Pakistani nationalism | Pakistani lobby in the United States | Economic and cultural links, combating stereotypes |
| Polish Americans | Polonia | Poland (1918) | Polish nationalism | Polish American Congress | Anti-communism, Economic links, Undocumented immigration issue |
| Puerto Ricans | Puerto Rican people | Puerto Rico | Puerto Rican nationalism | Political parties of Puerto Rico | Political status of Puerto Rico, ending drug wars in Puerto Rico, solidarity amongst other U.S. Latino groups, ending poverty and disenfranchisement amongst the Puerto Rican community |
| Taiwanese Americans | Taiwanese diaspora | Taiwan | Taiwan independence | China lobby | Political status of Taiwan, Anti-communism, Racial issues as Asian Americans |
| Ukrainian Americans | Ukrainian diaspora | Ukraine | Ukrainian nationalism | Ukrainian American Coordinating Council, Ukrainian Congress Committee of America | Anti-communism, Territorial integrity of Ukraine |
| Vietnamese Americans | Vietnamese diaspora | Vietnam (1975) | various | National Congress of Vietnamese Americans (NCVA), Boat People SOS, Viet Tan, Vietnamese-American Political Action Committee, Families of Vietnamese Political Prisoners Association, various others | Anti-communism, Racial issues as Asian Americans, Vietnam Heritage and Freedom Flag, Black April, Undocumented immigration issue, political activism in the US, Vietnam Human Rights Day, political prisoners within Vietnam |

== See also ==
- Diaspora studies
- Ethnic interest groups in the United States
- Ethnic nationalism
- Hyphenated American
- Ethnocultural politics in the United States
