= Hilda Crozzoli =

First female architect and civil engineer in Austria

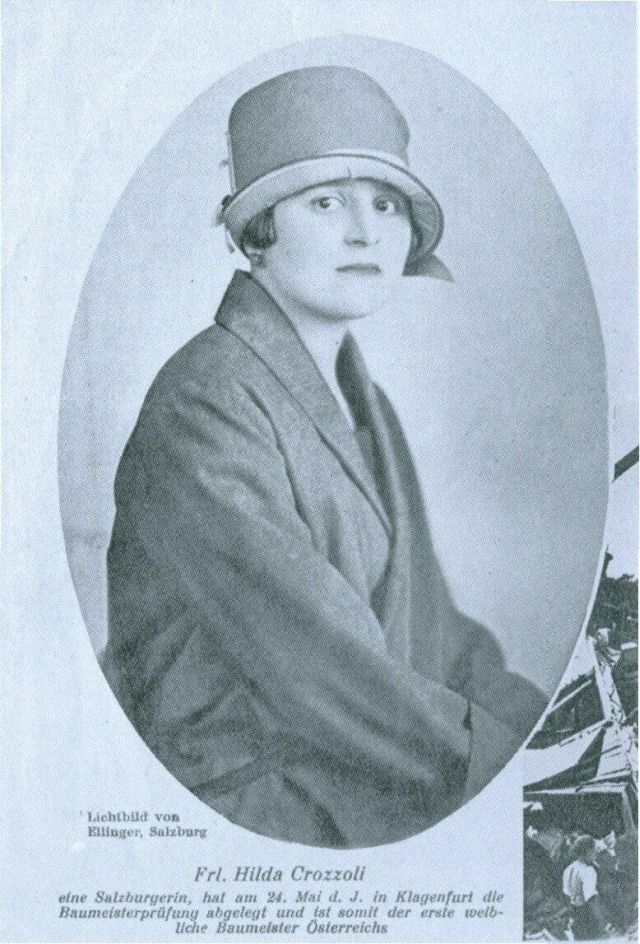
- Hilda Crozzoli (1927)
- Born: 16 August 1900; Salzburg, Austria-Hungary
- Died: 10 August 1972 (aged 71); Salzburg, Austria
- Occupation: architect civil engineer

Hilda Crozzoli (16 August 1900 - 10 August 1972) was one of the first female architects and civil engineers in Austria.

== Early life and education ==
Hilda Johana Crozzoli was born on 16 August 1900 in Salzburg, Austria. Her father was Ambrogio (Ambros) Crozzoli (1870–1925) and her mother was Lucia Antonia Santarossa (1871–1957) who had married in 1882. Crozzoli came from a northern Italian Friulian family of master builders and architects, who played a key role in the development in Salzburg in Austria over several generations. Ambrose Crozolli took the citizenship oath for himself and his family on 12 February 1907 and they received the right of Heimatrecht in the Maxglan area of Salzburg on 5 January 1915. (Heimatrecht was the right to settle in an area, introduced in Austria in 1849, allowing undisturbed residence and the right to poor relief). Her mother only spoke Italian and never learned to speak German.

Hilda was the fourth of seven children, but her two older brothers died in infancy, leaving five girls. After attending elementary and middle school, she completed a four-year course in construction at the Staatsgewerbeschule (State Trade School) in Salzburg and successfully passed the final exam in 1921 to become Austria's first architect. She was the first female graduate in the history of the construction department of the Staatsgewerbeschule. The graduation photograph of the class of 1921 shows two dozen men in black suits, looking straight into the camera. In the middle sits a woman turned to the side. Hilda Crozzoli's image was copied into the photograph afterward.

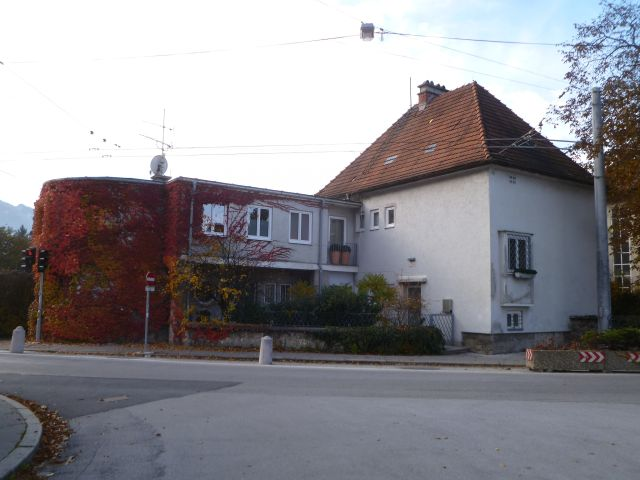
The Crozzoli-Bandian company office in Reichenhaller Straße in Salzburg

== Career ==
On 1 August 1917, she joined her father's architecture and building company as an apprentice. Between 1 March 1921 and 11 August 1925, she worked as a construction technician and construction foreman in her father's company. In addition to working in her father's company, she also worked for the city architect Josef Cwertschek in Schneegattern and in Vienna.

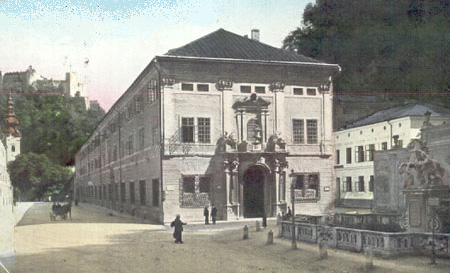
Salzburg Hofstall-Kaserne

As a construction technician in her father's company, P & A Crozzoli, Hilda Crozzoli was the site manager for the conversion of the grand cavalry barracks and stables of the Hofstallkasern into a natural history museum, today the Haus der Natur Salzburg. It sits at the center of the festival quarter of the city.

From 1 July 1926, she worked with the Universale Baugesellschaft m. b. H. (the Universal Construction Company) in Salzburg.

Between 12 and 14 May 1927, she sat and passed the exams to become a Baumeister (architect and civil engineer, traditionally called a master builder) in Klagenfurt. This was widely covered, not just in the Salzburg media, and the Verein Deutsch Österreichischer Ingenieure (Association of German Austrian Engineers) sent their congratulations.

In 1928, Hilda Crozzoli struck out on her own and became a freelance architect and civil engineer. Josef Sindinger was her partner until 1929, then she worked with the architect Richard Bandian, who she later married on 1 February 1934. In 1934 Hilda Crozzoli and her construction company moved to 19 Reichenhallerstraße 19 (today Reichenhaller Straße 27).

65 buildings are known to have been built under her direction by the Crozzoli-Bandian company between 1928 and 1966. Of particular note in 1927/28 is the establishment of the Fürsorge-Siedlung, the so-called "welfare settlement" in Schallmoos, an area of Salzburgh.

During the Second World War, 15 air raids destroy 46 percent of the city's buildings, and the Crozzoli-Bandian company were involved in the post-war reconstruction effort.

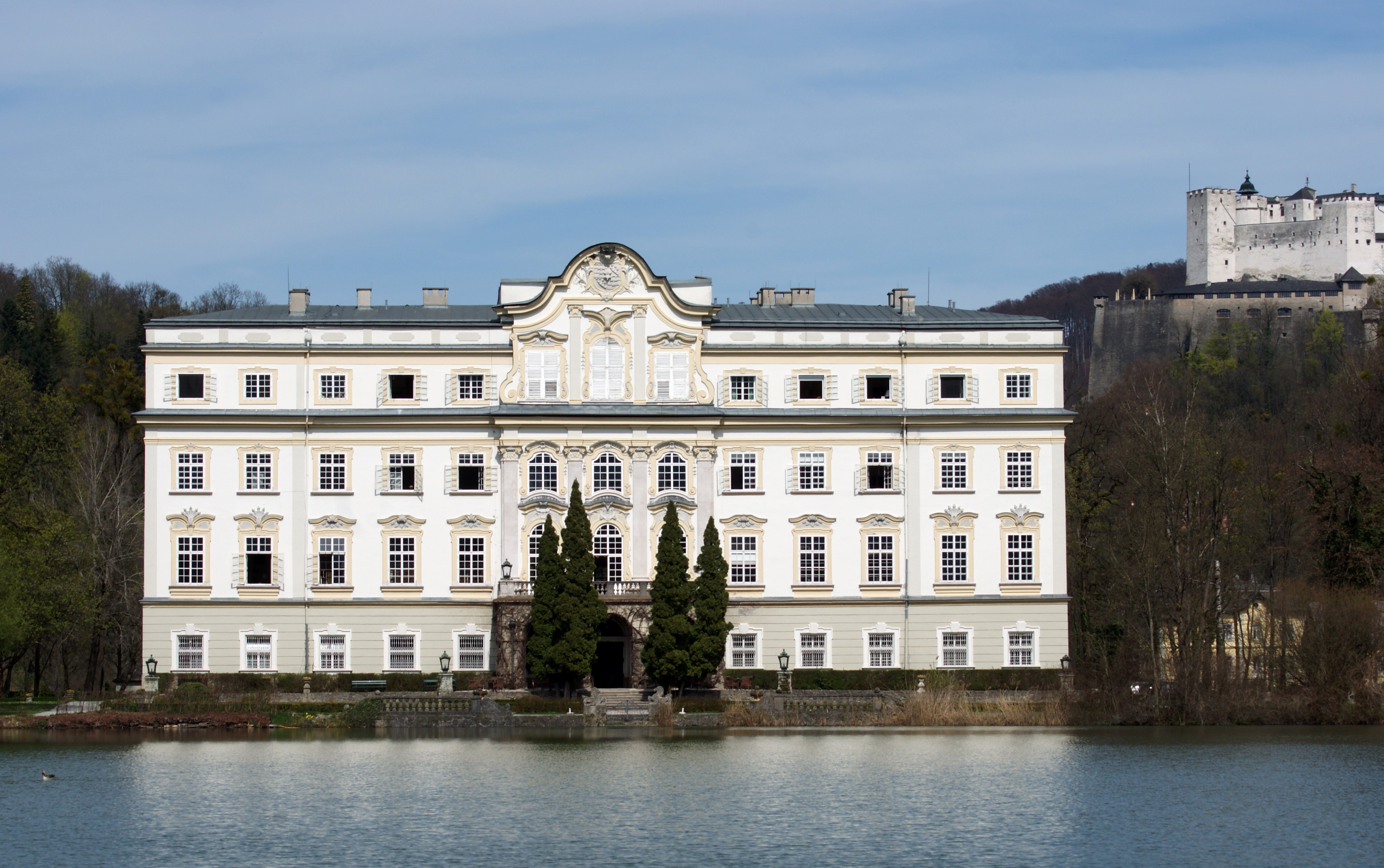
SchlossLeopoldskronWeier

Crozzoli repaired the building damage at Schloss Leopoldskron in 1945, which had been seized and occupied by the Nazis during the war. Her company rebuilt and restored the Hotel zum Goldenen Hirschen (1945/46) and the Bankhaus Daghofer (1968).

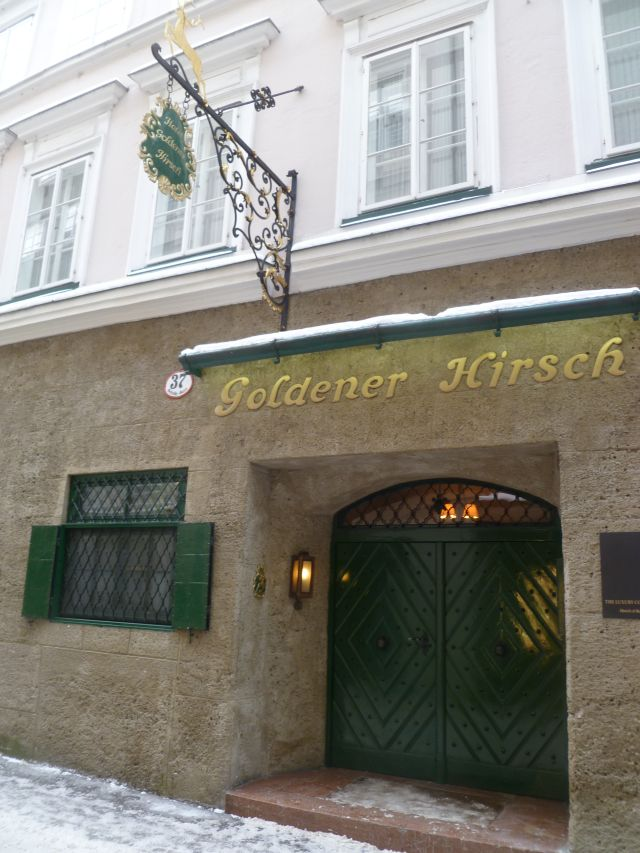
Hotel Goldener Hirsch-Getreidegasse

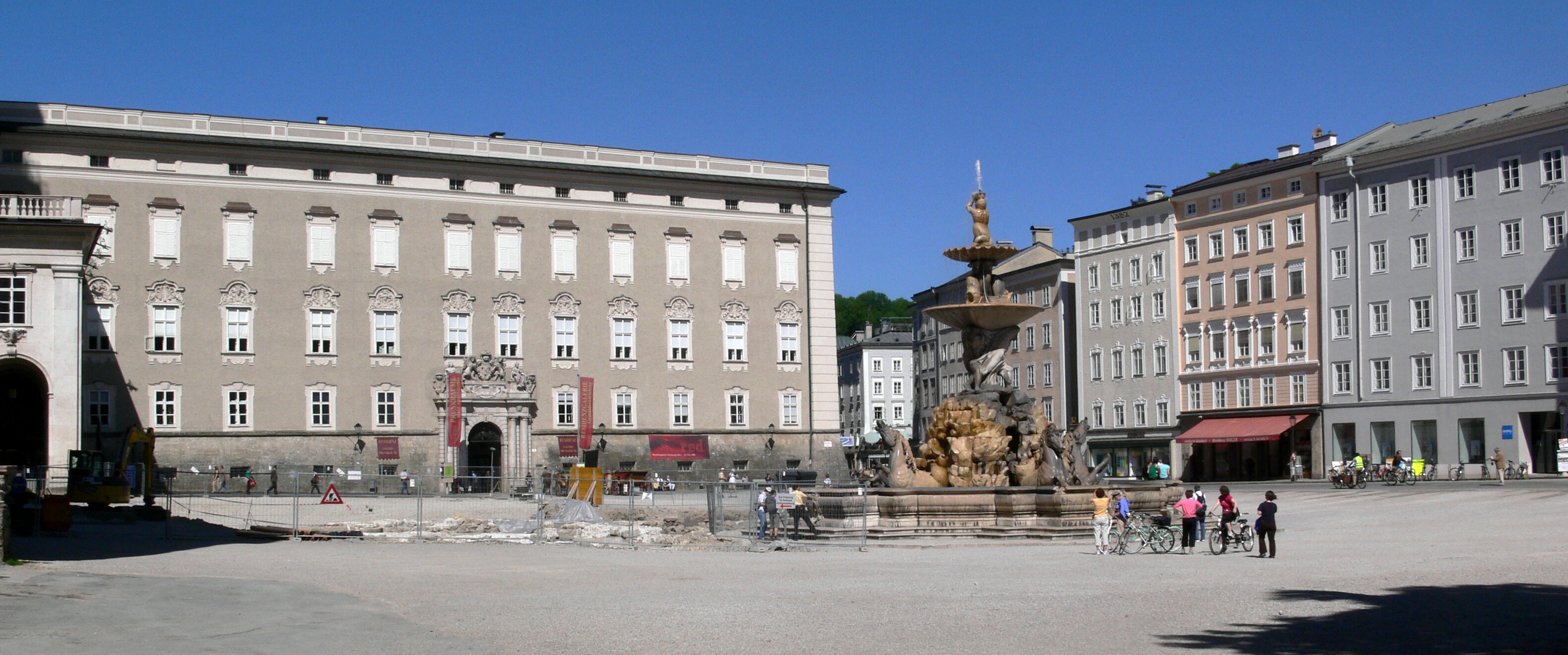
Salzburg Residenzplatz 2008

She also carried out the renovation of the Wallistraktes der Residenz for the Universität Salzburg in 1965.

Hilda Crozzoli-Bandian died on 10 August 1972 in Salzburg after a long illness. She was buried in the Maxglan cemetery.

== Legacy ==
Today many of her buildings survive and feature in architecture tours of Salzburg. Crozzoli featured in a 2013 exhibition Frauen machen Sichtbar at the Künstlerhaus, celebrating female architects in Salzburg.

== Awards ==
- Kriegsverdienstkreuz II. Klasse (1 September 1944) (War Merit Cross)
- Goldener Ehrenring des Salzburger Baugewerbes (11 March 1965) (Golden ring of honor of the Salzburg construction industry)
