= Philip J. Cohen =

American author

- Born: 1953 (age 72–73)
- Education: Bachelor of Arts from the New College of Florida (1975); Doctor of Medicine from the University of Medicine and Dentistry of New Jersey (1983)
- Occupations: Advisor to the permanent mission of Bosnia and Herzegovina to the United Nations; Author; Dermatologist
- Notable work: Serbia’s Secret War: Propaganda and the Deceit of History; The World War II and contemporary Chetniks: Their historico-political continuity and implications for stability in the Balkans
- Awards: Order of Danica Hrvatska for culture

Philip J. Cohen (born 1953) is a former advisor to the permanent mission of Bosnia and Herzegovina to the United Nations who has written several works on the history of the former Yugoslavia. He authored a noted book Serbia’s Secret War: Propaganda and the Deceit of History, first published in 1996 by Texas A&M University Press to mixed reviews. He followed this in 1997 with the publishing of The World War II and contemporary Chetniks: Their historico-political continuity and implications for stability in the Balkans by Ceres. In 1998, he received an award from Franjo Tuđman the President of Croatia for his "contribution in spreading the truth about the aggression against Croatia" and "exposing Great Serb and anti-Croat propaganda" through his books.

== Life and career ==
Philip J. Cohen attended New College of Florida in Sarasota where he earned a Bachelor of Arts degree, graduating in 1975. In 1983, he completed his Doctor of Medicine at the University of Medicine and Dentistry of New Jersey. In 2016 he was a practicing dermatologist.

In a footnote of an article published in Pace International Law Review in 1994, Cohen is described as "Advisor for Policy and Public Affairs, UN Mission of Bosnia and Herzegovina" and as the author of a position paper submitted to the Clinton-Gore transition team in early 1993.

During the Yugoslav Wars, Cohen had close ties with Croatia's ruling party, the Croatian Democratic Union (HDZ). In 1998, Franjo Tuđman, the President of Croatia, awarded Cohen the Order of Danica Hrvatska (for culture), the 13th highest award in the Croatian honours system, for his "contribution in spreading the truth about the aggression against Croatia", and "exposing Great Serb and anti-Croat propaganda" through his books, Serbia’s Secret War: Propaganda and the Deceit of History and The World War II and contemporary Chetniks: Their historico-political continuity and implications for stability in the Balkans.

== Serbia's Secret War: Propaganda and the Deceit of History ==
Texas A&M University Press published Cohen's Serbia's Secret War: Propaganda and the Deceit of History in 1996. The foreword was written by David Riesman, Professor Emeritus of Social Sciences at Harvard University. Its front cover included a reproduction of an anti-Semitic postage stamp printed in January 1942 to mark the Grand Anti-Masonic Exhibition that opened in Belgrade on 22 October 1941. On its back cover, the former Prime Minister of the United Kingdom Margaret Thatcher described the book as "a useful counter to current myths about Serbia's history during the Second World War", and the Library Journal recommended it highly as an "impressive, scholarly book offering a wealth of new information".

On 7 October 1996, the book was reviewed by Professor Brendan Simms, Fellow of Peterhouse, Cambridge, in the Times Higher Education Supplement. Simms observed that Cohen's book was "a revisionist work in that it overturns conventional wisdom, but not in the murky or dubious sense connoted by Holocaust "revisionism". First of all, Cohen never disputes that hundreds of thousands—but not millions—of Serbs died horribly, and often for no other reason than that they were Serbs. Second, despite the fact that Cohen is not a trained historian, his central thesis of extensive Serbian collaboration with Nazi Germany is well supported by the evidence". Simms mentioned that Cohen "somewhat blurs" but does not suppress the fundamental qualitative difference between the Croatian and Serbian involvement in The Holocaust, in that the Croatian involvement was led by the Croatian fascist Ustaše with German assistance, but the Serb involvement was led by the Germans with support from collaborationist Serbs. Simms noted that "in places Cohen gives the Croats the benefit of the doubt", but states that "[N]one of this affects Cohen's central argument: "Serbia" and many Serbs collaborated with Nazi Germany".

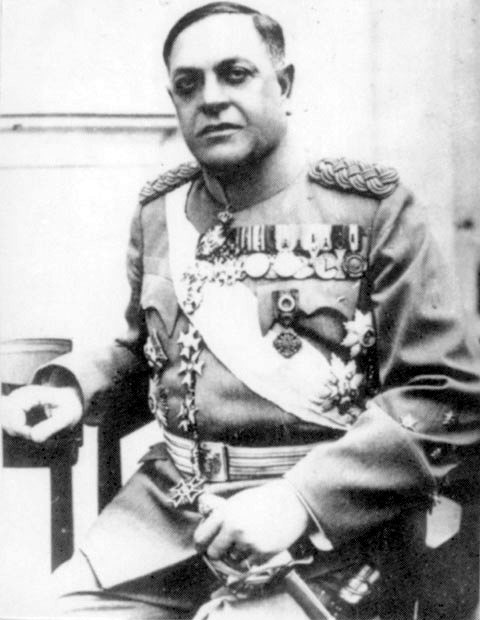
Milan Nedić led the Serbian puppet regime in the German-occupied territory of Serbia, which according to Cohen, pursued an agenda of an ethnically pure "Greater Serbia"

In December 1997, Cohen's book was reviewed by Professor Charles W. Ingrao of Purdue University's History Department in Nationalities Papers. Ingrao described the book as a "well-written, heavily footnoted narration" which "details the degree to which the Serbs of what is today Rump-Yugoslavia collaborated with the Nazis, both before and immediately after the April 1941 German invasion". He noted that, "It is difficult to refute his contention that it was the Croats, Serbs, Bosniaks, and Jews of multiethnic Bosnia and the Krajina that provided the backbone to the anti-fascist war effort at a time when both the Četniks and Nedić regimes of Serbia were pursuing their own agenda of an ethnically pure Greater Serbia". Ingrao observed that while scholars were already familiar with a great deal of the material included in the book, Cohen's exposé on the Serbian-Jewish Friendship Society founded by Slobodan Milošević was new evidence about an organisation that was used to convince the international community of the common bond between Serbs and Jews. Ingrao concluded that, while Cohen overplayed the evidence at a couple of points in the book, he was impressed by both its factual accuracy and balanced judgements.

In February 2000, Dennis Reinhartz, Professor of History and Russian at the University of Texas at Arlington reviewed Cohen's book in Holocaust and Genocide Studies. Reinhartz stated that Cohen's book belonged to "the current popular-historical and journalist literature that seeks to demonize and condemn more than to chronicle and elucidate fairly". He added that the book was "in danger of degenerating itself into an irrational conspiracy history and belongs to those history works of the Balkans that contribute little to our understanding of past events and their impact on the present".

The French journal Cahiers de l'URMIS published in its 2000 issue a paper by Marko Živković, an associate professor in the Anthropology Department at the University of Alberta, Edmonton, which criticised Cohen's book. In it, Živković, himself a Serbian Jew, stated that Serbia's Secret War: Propaganda and the Deceit of History was the culmination of a two-track strategy by the Croatian media aimed at "damage control" regarding Croatian atrocities against Serbs in the Independent State of Croatia during World War II. Živković stated that this strategy involved presenting anti-Semitism in the NDH as an import from Nazi Germany, and in trying to show that the Serbs were no better, and possibly worse in their treatment of Jews during World War II than the Croats. Živković observed that Cohen had not lied or distorted the sources, but had failed to weigh the evidence regarding whether anti-Semitism was marginal or dominant in Serbia during the war.

In 2002, Professor David Bruce MacDonald of the University of Otago published his Balkan Holocausts?: Serbian and Croatian Victim-Centered Propaganda and the War in Yugoslavia. In it, he described Serbia's Secret War as "a controversial pro-Croatian revision of Serbian history". MacDonald cites Cohen as a "good example" of a "non-Croatia[n] propagandist who became intimately involved with the [Tuđman] regime."

Cohen's book was mentioned in Yugoslavia and its Historians, published by Stanford University Press in 2003. In a chapter titled Clio amid the Ruins. Yugoslavia and Its Predecessors in Recent Historiography, Dušan J. Djordjevich observes that "the quantity and quality of new historiography on Serbs and Serbia are disappointing", and states that "[e]fforts to reinterpret or fill gaps in the literature are often subject to obtrusive, distorting agendas of apology or condemnation". In a footnote to these observations, Djordjevich describes Cohen's and another book as ones which explore important topics, but "in which censorious zeal trumps balanced scholarship".

In 2011, Miroslav Svirčević of the Institute for Balkan Studies of the Serbian Academy of Sciences and Arts reviewed Cohen's book in its journal Balcanica. Svirčević was highly critical of the book, and stated that it belongs to "pseudo-scholarly publications, not infrequently swaying on the verge of ugliest war and racist propaganda". Svirčević further pointed that "In fact, the Cohen's book teems with forgeries, half-truths, incompetent use of historical sources, overstrained theses and ill-intended inferences." In the same year, the historian Klaus Buchenau criticised Cohen for drawing heavily on contemporary press accounts to demonstrate the "fascism" of the Serbian Orthodox Church, and failing to take into account "the omnipresent censorship and manipulation" in the Nedić-controlled newspapers.

In March 2011, Marko Attila Hoare, an associate professor of economics, politics, and history at Kingston University posted a personal blog entry which dealt with a number of issues regarding Cohen's book. He wrote that denial of the genocide at Srebrenica in July 1995 "tends to go hand-in-hand with the denial of the genocidal crimes carried out by Serbian Nazi quislings and collaborators during World War II". He stated that "Great Serbian nationalists of the 1990s waged a hate campaign against Croats and Bosniaks, seeking to equate the entire Croat and Bosniak nations with the Ustashas". He observed that Cohen wrote his book as a response to this propaganda. Hoare recounted meeting with Cohen in the mid-1990s, and stated that the book was "very good". He also noted that attacks on Cohen by Serb nationalists have continued for 15 years, extending to a claim that Cohen had not even written the book. Hoare dismissed this claim as a "complete fabrication", stating that he had met Cohen at Yale University during the book's writing, had read the manuscript and discussed it with Cohen at length, and seen Cohen's library and archive.

The following year, an article by Alexander Mirkovic of Northern Michigan University was published in Balcanica. He stated that it is common to find an opinion, even among experienced United States Department of State officials, that the Yugoslav Partisans were mainly supported by anti-fascist Croats and Slovenes. In a footnote to this observation, he states that page 95 of Cohen's book contains the false claim that "[o]verall, from 1941 to 1945, the Partisans of Croatia were 61 per cent Croat and 28 per cent Serb". (Note: This figure in Cohen's book is drawn from the 1978 work of Ivan Jelić, Hrvatska u ratu i revoluciji, 1941–1945 [Croatia in War and Revolution, 1941–1945]. Cohen gives Jelić's figures as 140,124 ethnic Croats and 63,720 ethnic Serbs.)

In 2013, Raphael Israeli, Emeritus Professor of Middle Eastern, Islamic and Chinese history at the Hebrew University of Jerusalem published his book The Death Camps of Croatia: Visions and Revisions, 1941-1945. In that book he referred to Cohen's work as "seminal", and noted that Cohen had "copiously documented" the large amount of anti-Semitic press in the German-occupied territory of Serbia. He also observed that Cohen had "definitively demonstrated" that the head of the German-appointed puppet regime, Milan Nedić, along with other members of the Serbian Orthodox Church, "were aware and supportive of the German extermination plan and execution [of Jews], and were not loath to lend a hand when asked". Further, Israeli referenced and quoted Reinhartz's review of Cohen's book, and noted that Belgrade Jewish author on the Holocaust in Serbia, Jaša Almuli, told the press that he doubted Cohen himself had written the book and suggested that it may have originated from "Tuđman's kitchen" in Zagreb as a form of political propaganda.

The sociologist Jovan Byford lists Serbia's Secret War among a "series of propagandist pieces of quasi-historical writing" written by pro-Croatian authors during the 1990s. Byford emphasizes that Cohen belongs to group of authors whose works support Croatian side in propaganda war with Serbia also by intentionally depicting Serbs as genuine "genocidal nation". In a June 2018 review of a work on a similar topic, the historian Luke Gramith from University of West Virginia referred to Philip Cohen's Serbia's Secret War as a polemical and even anti-Serbian work.

== Bibliography ==
- Cohen, Philip J. (1992). Serbian Anti-Semitism and Exploitation of the Holocaust as Propaganda.
- Cohen, Philip J. (1993). Desecrating the Holocaust: Serbia's Exploitation of the Holocaust as Propaganda. Philip J. Cohen.
- Cohen, Philip J. (1996). Serbia's Secret War: Propaganda and the Deceit of History. Texas A&M University Press. ISBN 978-0-89096-760-7.
- Cohen, Philip J. (1997). The World War II and contemporary Chetniks: Their historico-political continuity and implications for stability in the Balkans [Drugi svjetski rat i suvremeni četnici : Njihov povijesno-politički kontinuitet i posljedice po stabilnost na Balkanu] (in English and Croatian). Zagreb: Ceres. ISBN 978-953-6108-44-2.
