= Ethnic interest group =

Special interest group

An ethnic interest group or ethnic lobby, according to Thomas Ambrosio, is an advocacy group (often a foreign policy interest group) established along cultural, ethnic, religious or racial lines by an ethnic group for the purposes of directly or indirectly influencing the foreign policy of their resident country in support of the homeland and/or ethnic kin abroad with which they identify.

== Overview ==
According to Ambrosio, "like other societal interest groups, ethnic identity groups establish formal organizations devoted to promoting group cohesiveness and addressing group concerns." While many formal organizations established by ethnic identity groups are apolitical, others are created explicitly for political purposes. In general, groups who seek to influence government policy on domestic or foreign issues are referred to as advocacy groups. Those interest groups established by ethnic identity groups are referred as to ethnic interest groups.

== Characteristics ==
=== Foreign concerns ===
According to Thomas Ambrosio, most ethnic identity groups have connections inside their host country. The connections can be derived from membership in a diaspora with ethnic kin in their historical homeland (e.g. Anglo-Americans and Britain, Italian-Americans and Italy, Armenian-Americans and Armenia, Arab-Americans and the Middle East); scattered among many countries (e.g. Jewish-Americans, Palestinian-Americans); or based on perceived similarities with others even though they may share little or no common ancestry (e.g. White Southerners and Afrikaners in South Africa, African-Americans and black South Africans, Muslims worldwide).

Because of the concern of the ethnic groups for "kin" in foreign states, many ethnic interest groups focus on influencing the foreign policy of their host countries to benefit there foreign "kin" and thus act as foreign policy interest groups.

=== Variable influence ===
The influence of ethnic groups on the foreign policy of many states, including that of the United States, is "a reality", although these ethnic groups must "compete for influence with a plethora of other special interest groups and institutional interests." According to a literature review of the topic conducted by Patrick J. Haney and Walt Vanderbush, the primary factors that determine the relative strength of influence of an ethnic interest group are:

1. "Organizational strength – organizational unity, a professional lobbying apparatus that provides useful information, and financial resources;
2. Membership unity, placement, and voter participation – based on the group's electoral implications;
3. Salience and resonance of the message – the ability to influence public opinion;
4. Push on an open door – ethnic interest groups will be more successful if they promote policies that the government already favors;
5. Strength of opposition
6. Permeability of and access to the government – ethnic interest groups [in the context of the United States] are more likely to be successful when the policy in question requires a congressional role since it is usually more porous than the executive;
7. Mutually supportive relationships – while groups need policy makers to do something for them, policymakers also need the ethnic interest groups. Ethnic interest groups may provide a host of valuable resources to policymakers, including information, votes, and campaign contributions."

== Discussing ethnic influence ==
The diversity that enriches our domestic life remains a recurrent cause of difficulties in our foreign relations. — U.S. Senator Charles Mathias (R-Md.)

Discussing the influence and proper role of ethnic groups in the formulation of foreign policy has often been difficult and contentious. This section first describes the typical characteristics of the debates which restrict their focus to the legitimacy of or the harm caused by ethnic lobbies. The second section presents a response to simplistic debates of ethnic lobbies devoid of context, by refocusing on the identification of the interests of the broader community and then permitting or limiting the influence of ethnic lobbies based on their alignment within the interests of the broader context.

=== Debating legitimacy verse harm ===
Discussions of foreign policy formulation and the involvement of ethnic interest groups often become debates on the legitimacy or illegitimacy of ethnic interest groups devoid of wider context. The two opposing positions often expressed in these debates: One interpretations welcomes a multicultural foreign policy and thus views the influence of ethnic groups as legitimate. The opposing interpretation comes to a conclusion that the influence of ethnic interest groups can result in a parochial capture of a nation's foreign policy that harms the "true" national interest and common good.

==== Legitimate multiculturalism ====
Those arguing for a multicultural foreign policy "see little wrong with ethnic groups having a voice in the foreign policy process." They tend to "believe that a more diverse foreign policy" results in the enrichment of the nation "both at home and abroad."

There are six common arguments in favor of the enriching multiculturalism interpretation:

1. "A multicultural foreign policy is a reflection of [a state's] liberal democratic ethos.
2. It respects the diversity of the [nation].
3. It serves as a correction for historically '[dominant ethnic group-centric]' foreign policies.
4. It helps to resist the trend towards isolationism.
5. It spreads democratic principles throughout the world.
6. Ethnic identity groups can reinforce [national] interests."

==== Harmful parochial capture ====
Those who argue against the idea of a multicultural foreign policy influenced by domestic ethnic interest groups often begin from a "realist" perspective and "start with the premise that there exists 'objective' [national] interests that may (or may not) differ from the interests of substate political actors (ethnic, business or otherwise). Thus, a tension potentially exists between 'national' and 'special' interests. According to this argument, ethnic identity groups may harm the [nation] if these groups distract the [nation] from the pursuit of its national interests or induce it to pursue a foreign policy contrary to its national interests. In the worst-case scenario, ethnic groups can effectively hijack the foreign policy process and use the strength of [the nation] for their parochial interests."

There are seven common arguments in favor of the parochial capture interpretation:

1. "Ethnic interest groups often put their own interests ahead of '[national]' interests.
2. They undercut the foundations of [nation's] democracy.
3. They may be agents of foreign (and possibly hostile) governments.
4. They promote an incoherent foreign policy.
5. They resist/prevent necessary changes in [the nation's] foreign policy.
6. Certain ethnic interest groups are simply too powerful.
7. They may get the [nation] involved in conflicts where no [national] interest is threatened."

==== Criticisms of legitimacy verse harm debates ====
Both stances, according to Ambrosio, are unrealistic.

The uncritical embrace of ethnic interests in the formulation of foreign policy, as favored by the enriching multiculturalism interpretation, is problematic because:

1. "It is fundamentally undemocratic because it allows a small minority to determine policy for the vast majority (just as it is fundamentally undemocratic to allow any small interest group to determine [national] foreign policy."
2. The traditional foreign policy debating "process itself tends to moderate policies; that is; extremism will be more likely if the process is circumvented" by ethnic lobbies.
3. "It is a recipe for conflict: if a policy needs to be determined towards a specific region where ethnic groups are in conflict, how do we determine which diaspora should effective make [national] foreign policy?"

Equally unworkable is the complete exclusion of ethnic participation in foreign policy formulation advocated by the parochial capture interpretation:

1. It "is fundamentally undemocratic to arbitrarily exclude certain groups from legitimate expressions of political preference."
2. Trying to enforce a ban on ethnic involvement "would be nearly impossible: ethnic identity groups have ingeniously found ways around bans on ethnic mobilization."
3. Many "interest groups that support a specific ethnic agenda may argue that they are not ethnic-specific."

=== Debating broader interests and goals first ===
A productive alternative, according to Ambrosio, to debating the abstract legitimacy or harm of ethnic influence in the general case, is reorienting the debate towards identifying, clarifying and methods of pursuing the nation's broad interests. Only after the broader community' interests and thus goals are identified, can one properly evaluate the value, in the rich context of the nation's broadly established common good, offered by the involvement or influence of individual special or ethnic interest groups. The result is that ethnic interest groups with goals that align with the broader community will be bestowed with more legitimacy than those goals exhibit less or no alignment.

Ambrosio writes:

"It should not be surprising that neither extreme amounts to what can reasonably called sound foreign policy. [...] Instead, a more sympathetic perspective of both arguments would result in differences over the range of legitimate influence by special interest groups, not over the influence itself (although, for some, the range could be quite limited or quite broad.)
Indeed, the debate over the legitimate range of influence by special interest groups can be a healthy part of the political process. However, such a debate must always be focused on the end goal of defining, protecting, and advancing the interests of the broader community. [...] Thus, it should not be the groups influencing the debate themselves that are the target for criticism or praise, but whether they are advancing the [nation's] interests. Ignoring the broader community's interests is just as dangerous as ostracizing certain groups from the foreign policy process merely because they are based on ethnic identities."

== See also ==
- Advocacy group
- Dual loyalty
- Indigenism
- Diaspora politics
- Ethnic interest groups in the United States
- List of ethnic interest groups in Canada
- Foreign policy interest group
