= Catholic schools in Canada =

The existence of Catholic schools in Canada can be traced to the year 1620, when the first school was founded Catholic Recollet Order in Quebec. The first school in Alberta was also a Catholic one, at Lac Ste.-Anne in 1842. As a general rule, all schools in Canada were operated under the auspices of one Christian body or another until the 19th century.

== History ==
In the early 19th century, there was a movement to take the responsibility for education away from individuals and make it more of a state function. Thus, governments allowed schools and school boards to collect taxes to fund schools. Previously, a combination of charitable contributions from the members of a particular religious body, supplemented with tuition fees paid by the parents of the students, had been the method of financing a school.

Nevertheless, an element of religious formation remained as this was considered a necessary part of educating the whole person.

As the Catholic minority played an integral part of founding and establishing the country of Canada, it was important to them that their rights to educate their children in Catholic schools be protected in the British North America Act 1867. In fact, when the Fathers of Confederation came from New Brunswick, Nova Scotia, Canada East, and Canada West to meet in Charlottetown and Quebec, they quickly concluded, in the words of one of the Fathers, Sir Charles Tupper, that "Without this guarantee for the rights of minorities being embodied in that new constitution, we should have been unable to obtain any Confederation whatever." As described by The Canadian Encyclopedia:

The concept that church and state are partners, not hostile and incompatible forces that must be kept at a distance, has made it possible for educational authorities in Canada to subsidize Jewish schools in Québec and Hutterite schools on the Prairies, to condone Amish schools in Ontario, and to permit the Salvation Army to develop its own public schools in Newfoundland.

The "public" school system was that of the majority of taxpayers in an area. In most of the English-speaking parts of Ontario, this tended to amount to a form of "common-core Protestantism". This was accelerated under the 1846 School Act spearheaded by Egerton Ryerson. He believed it was part of the Government's mandate to be a social agency forming children in a uniform, common, Protestant culture, regardless of their individual family backgrounds. Although working in Ontario, his ideas were influential all across Canada.

In Ontario, Alberta, and in other provinces, if there were enough families of a particular faith that wished to do so, they could set up a separate school, supported by the specially-directed taxes of those families who elected to support the separate school over the public schools. In practice, this gave a mechanism for Catholics to continue having their own schools. Separate schools tended to be Catholic in the south of Ontario whereas in northern Ontario, where the majority of people were Catholic, Protestants were the ones to set up separate schools. Yet, Catholic schools form the single largest system in Canada offering education with a religious component.

In the 1990s there was a further movement in many provinces to dis-allow any religious instruction in schools financed by taxes. Currently five of the thirteen provinces and territories still allow faith-based school boards to be supported with tax money: Alberta, Ontario, Saskatchewan, Northwest Territories, and Yukon (to grade 9 only). Newfoundland and Labrador voted to end the denominational school system, in a 1997 referendum, and a corresponding constitutional amendment. Quebec also passed a constitutional amendment in 1997 that abolished its Catholic and Protestant school system.

In 1999, the United Nations Human Rights Committee determined in Waldman v. Canada that Canada was in violation of article 26 of the International Covenant on Civil and Political Rights, because Ontario's Ministry of Education discriminates against non-Catholics by continuing to publicly fund separate Catholic schools, but not those of any other religious groups.

== Quebec ==
Schools in Quebec were organized along confessional lines until amendments to the Education Act took effect on 1 July 1998. Thus, just as in Ontario, there existed parallel Catholic and Protestant school boards, financed by taxpayers who chose which schools to support, but ultimately controlled by the Provincial Government.

Until the changes of 1998, the law in Quebec required all religion teachers in Catholic schools to be practicing Catholics. Religion courses at the time, while dealing with Theology and Church history, were more pastoral in nature, especially in elementary schools. It was thus assumed that a non-believer could not properly instruct children by modeling for them an adult living their Catholic faith.

The changes of 1998 re-organized school boards along linguistic lines – English and French – and reduced their number, among other things. Catholic students no longer attend Mass. Before the changes of 1998, each Catholic and Protestant school board had an English and a French sector. The importance of either sector varied from region to region and board to board.

== Ontario Catholic schools ==
=== Origins of Catholic schools in Ontario ===
Canadian Catholic schools were established in Upper Canada (Ontario) before Confederation. This raised tensions between the Protestant majority and Catholic minority. They wanted a separate education from the Protestants that focused on their religion. Catholic schools were often based in Irish Catholicism. During the mid-1800s, Irish Catholics in Ontario had a strong distrust towards public education. In Ireland, the Protestant minority ruled over the Catholic majority, and there was a strong connection between the Protestant government and the control of religion. The Catholic church in Ireland felt condemned by the Protestant government, so in Canada, Irish Catholics had precedent to distrust an English-based government. Public school legislation made the Irish Catholics worried about losing Irish culture and heritage. Catholic schools were not thought of highly before Confederation, but in the British North America Act 1867, Catholic schools are recognized alongside public schools.

The British North American Act (BNA Act) was the piece of legislation signed during Canada's confederation. In 1863, Sir Richard W. Scott created the Separate Schools Act (also known as the Scott Act), which outlined the creation of a separate school system that would grant religious privileges to students - in this case, Catholic. The first paragraph of section 93 in the BNA Act stated that "nothing in any such law shall prejudicially affect any right or privilege with respect to denominational schools which any class of persons have by law in the Province at the union." This sanctioned Scott's Separate Schools Act in Canada's constitution.

As a part of the Scott Act, rural Catholic schools gained the same rights as those in urban areas. They also gained financial support from the central government. Canada's confederation complicated the national Catholic school situation. By 1867, the groundwork and foundation for Catholic schooling had been created, but after confederation, jurisdiction over education was given to the provincial governments. One of the complications was for the minorities in the different provinces. The French minority in Ontario and English minority in Quebec struggled greatly with the Catholic school question post-confederation. As part of section 93 of the British North America Act, denominational schools (like Catholic schools) had their foundation from pre-confederation preserved in legislation. This small part of section 93 became a strong argument when Provincial governments tried to infringe on their rights.

Catholic schools often grew out of parishes, and through the transitional period, most parishes in the Toronto area were connected to a Catholic school. Catholic and public schools had a similar curriculum, but Catholic schools were as much about maintaining a Catholic identity in a largely Protestant province as it was about a good education. Opposed to public schools, Catholic schools started with a religious education and used that as a baseline. Once students had a religious background, it became acceptable to teach them secular subjects, because they understood Catholicism.

Catholic schools were extremely underfunded in the late 1800s, because they relied on private funding rather than public. Ontario Catholic schools survived because of religious leaders who built the schools, created the curricula, and gave large donations. The business and corporate taxes Ontarians had to pay were not allocated to Catholic schools; however, in the 1880s Catholic businessmen were allowed to target their commercial taxes to Catholic schools. Ontario Catholic schools used the Separate Schools Act to justify public funding. The Separate Schools Act allows separate school boards to be created with relative ease in Ontario. Five families would have a meeting where they elect one member from three of the five families to be trustees of their new school board. The families then notify the leader of the local School Board and gain their signature. Lastly, the families send the signed document to the Department of Education in Toronto. The minister of Education did not need to be involved, and there were no mandatory minimums for class sizes, or proof of financial stability required.

Since 1855, Ontario Catholic schools have not paid public school taxes. Tax conflict and tension between separate school and public school supporters involves the "corporation tax" introduced in the 20th century. The corporation tax allows corporations to divide a portion of their public school tax to be given to the separate schools. This is one way Catholic schools have gained their financial aid.

In 1876, Egerton Ryerson instituted Catholic high schools, which added four years of additional schooling. Although the majority of Catholic students still joined labour forces after elementary, high school gave those who wanted it additional education for careers in business or theology. Public funding for Catholic schools happened after the mass migration at the beginning of the 20th century, when Catholic populations rose and the demand for better and more Catholic high schools increased.

This is when Ontario's government used section 93 against the Catholics. The government argued that because public funding for Catholic high schools was not a part of the foundation created pre-confederation and protected in the BNA Act, the government had no legislative obligation. Catholics argued that pre-confederated Canada did not have any high school education, and that curriculums taught in grades 9 and 10 were already taught in Catholic schools. There were some compromises. At the end of the 19th century, the provincial government included "Separate School Trustees" on high school boards. This gave Catholic students access to Catholic support in public high schools. Moving into the 20th century, this was still not enough. In 1925, Ontario Catholic bishops took the provincial government to court. In 1928, the case made it to the Judicial Committee of the Privy Council (the highest court in the British Empire) and they ruled in favour of the province.

Another cause for controversy were the Catholic school curriculums, because it is difficult to define of what a Catholic education consists. Catholic schools were forged by the communities around them. Communities had different interpretations of Catholicism, the Bible, how the school should operate, and their political structure. Although Catholic school curriculums used Provincial guidelines for their secular subjects, the Catholic church maintained authority over religious subjects. The Catholic school curriculum was strongly affected in the 1880s and 1890s, with the development of "new education" in Ontario. "New education" was the ideology that, in addition to what was already being taught, a more practical education was needed. Premier James Whitney in 1905 added it to his policy, involving a big push for Kindergarten. Catholic schools started to implement the "new education" ideology in 1890, when 49 Catholic students were involved in the first kindergarten programs.

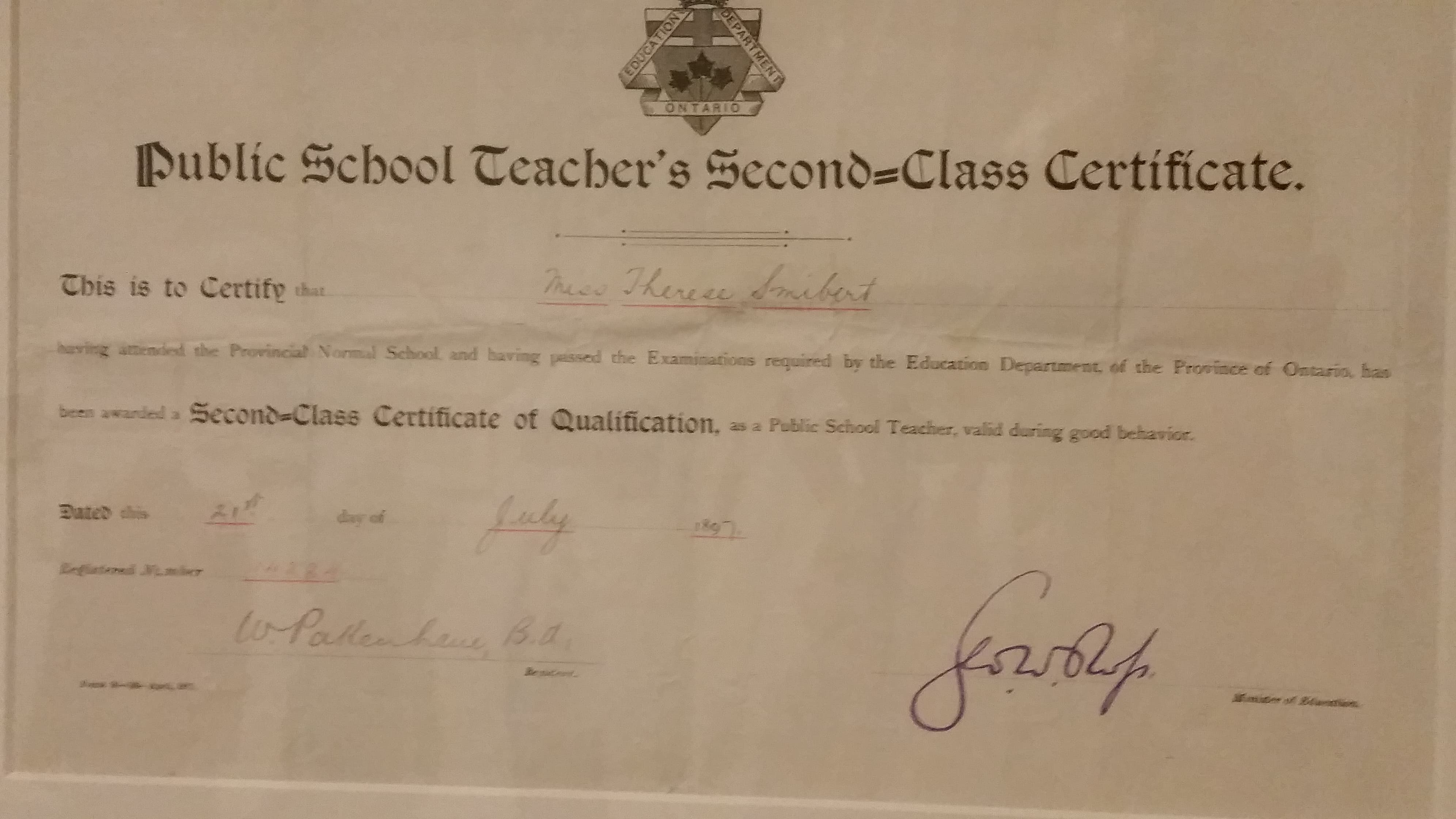
The Teaching Certificate represents Catholic school teachers’ competition with Public school teachers. Catholic school teachers need to legitimize their credentials.

There was a large debate in Ontario post-confederation about the certification of teachers for Catholic schools. Many argued that Catholic school teachers, who were at this time clergy with little teacher training, should have the same teaching standards as public school teachers did; Catholic school teachers should have provincial teaching certificates. On one side of the debate, public school teachers argued that their competition against Catholic teachers was unfair, because they were not as educated but were hired more often. This was because Catholic schools in the late 1800s were poor, and so it was cheaper for public schools to hire Catholic teachers. They did not need to gain the same education as public school teachers because of the BNA Act, which stated that "nothing in any such [provincial] law [relative to education] shall prejudicially affect any right or privilege with respect to denominational schools which any class of persons have by law in the Province at the Union." The other side of the debate was Catholic leaders who argued that Catholic school teachers did not need to gain the same education as public school teachers, because of the constitution and their lower financial status. It was hard for Catholic school teachers to pay for the education needed.

The decision of Catholic teacher qualification was an important one. Catholic schools wanted to prove their legitimacy in comparison to public ones, and so they created Catholic teacher Certification. This was in congruence with the 1907 Seth Bill, which related the years of teaching experience to one's certification. After continual urging by school inspectors, the Ontario Provincial government started to legitimately look into the certification of Catholic school teachers. Over the next 20 years, the issue was debated back and forth with the decision on 2 November 1907 by the Judicial Committee of the Privy Council to uphold that Catholic teachers needed certification. With seven years of teaching experience, one would receive a first-class certificate, while second- and third-class certificates were given to those with fewer years of teaching experience. The levels of certification made the school system appear more legitimate and made clergy and lay people equals when teaching at Catholic schools in Ontario.

By 1899, Catholic schools in Toronto were beginning to change. The growing Catholic population in Toronto forged a strong Catholic identity and community. This created a desire to improve the Catholic school system from what was considered to be a daycare for Irish children. Their dual mission was to instill Catholic values and patriotism for Canada. Catholics wanted their youth to grow up as contributing members of Canadian society, while keeping their Catholic roots. They wanted better teachers, buildings, and curriculums than previous schools. The English-speaking Catholic school systems became very proud of these changes as the school system developed. Catholic school statistics show a major growth during this time. The number of schools, teachers, and students all more than doubled. In 1885 Toronto, there were 13 Catholic elementary schools, with 82 teachers and 3341 students, and by 1919, there were 29 schools, with 208 teachers and 8500 students.

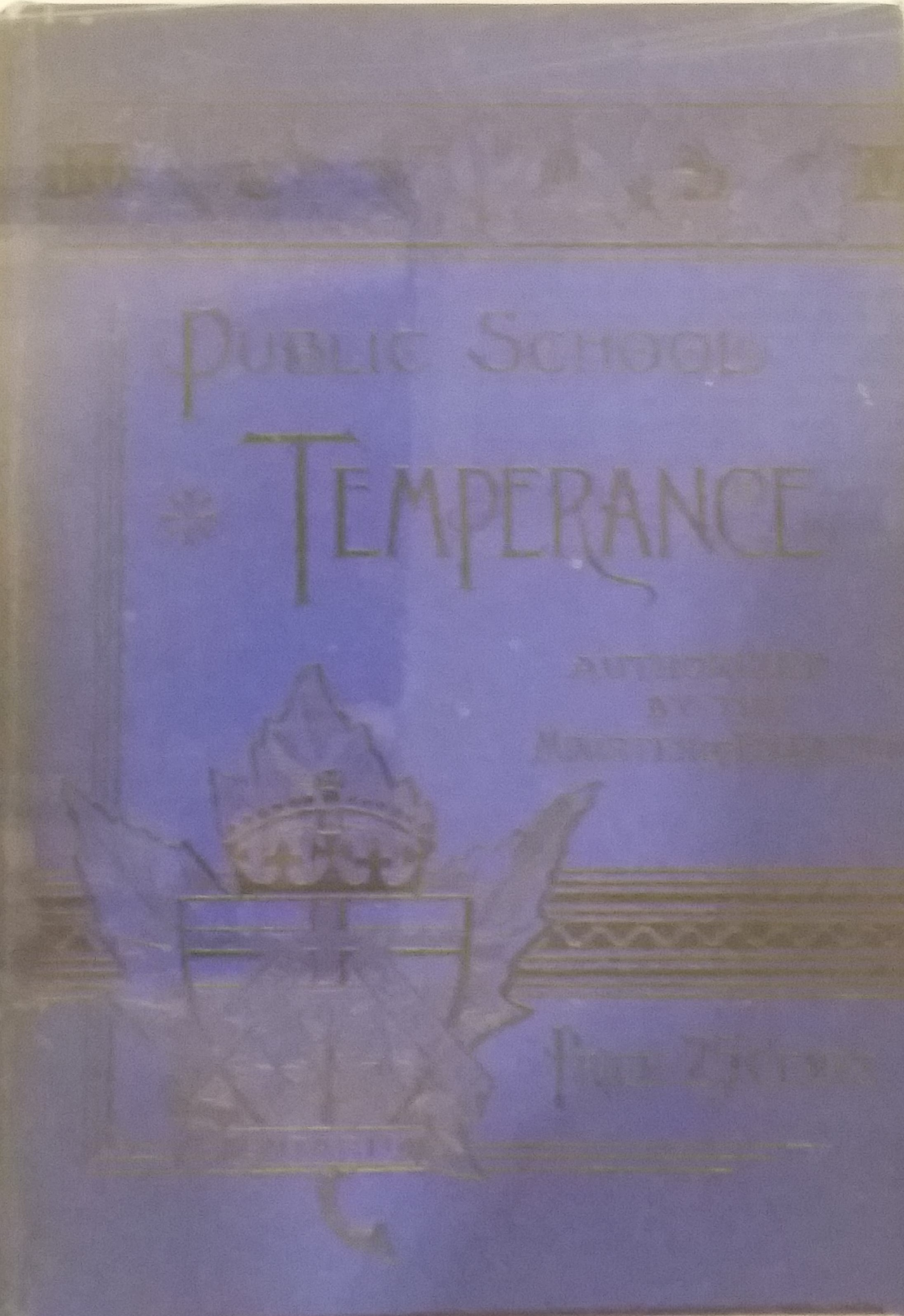
The 1887 Public School Reader was used in Catholic education, to ensure that Catholic students who were progressing to public high school had the necessary prior education.

In 1910, The Public School Readers were settled on as the official reader for Catholic schools. Canadian and British history and culture were very prominent in the readers. Older Irish Catholics disliked them for this reason, but they were chosen because they were the most updated texts, and would be the most useful for students going to secondary and post-secondary institutions. Because the main goals of Ontario Catholic schools were to prepare Catholic students for further public education, and to make them contributing members to Canadian society, these readers were crucial.

Many older Irish Catholics did not like the new direction of the Catholic schools. When they were first developed in Ontario, Catholic schools were a symbol of Irish and Catholic identity, but in the growing multicultural Canada, it became more important for the Catholic schools to emphasize a "Canadian" identity rather than an "Irish" one. They were focused on Canadian patriotism and teaching their students how to survive in a Canadian society. Canadian identity referred to many different cultures, including the Irish, but not limited to them. The other point of tension was that Canadian identity then was still predominantly British, and so, similarly to how they felt about the public schools, older Irish Catholics were worried that their children and grandchildren would be assimilated and indoctrinated into British culture.

Franco-Ontarians were also worried about the influence of British, and moreover English, culture in Ontario Catholic schools. Bilingual schooling was a very controversial topic in late-19th and early-20th-century Ontario. The Bishop of London, Ontario, Michael Francis Fallon, exemplifies the bilingual school tensions within the Catholic Church. He, as a Catholic bishop, was against bilingual schools. He argued that bilingual schools weakened the already low respect for separate schools and ordered his Catholic school teachers to only teach in English or French but not both.

Franco-Ontarian immigration represented approximately 25% of a 600,000 person increase between 1881 and 1911. During this time, although there was a growing French population in Ontario and thus a necessity for bilingualism in schools, many English Ontarians were getting frustrated by the lack of English teaching in the bilingual school system. Those for whom bilingual schools were there, thought that the teaching was excellent. The difficulty was, these bilingual schools catered to the minority in Ontario, and as such focused as much (or more) on the minority language. Those in charge (the English) did not agree with them, because there was less English being taught in the schools. This was an issue that affected many minorities including the Germans. The increased French population made them a large target. In 1885, English was a requirement for both Catholic and public school teachers, and it was necessary for all readers to be written in English. These tensions would eventually result in an Act titled Regulation 17, which demanded teachers to only use English.

Catholic schools in smaller Ontario counties would integrate Irish and French Catholic students, because there is not enough financial support to build more than one school. This was not only difficult because of the cultural divide, but also because teachers in these smaller counties were often not bilingual, and so teaching English and French was hard.

=== Twentieth-century Catholic schools and the push for grade 13 ===
By the 20th century, Catholic schools had little money, were old and in disrepair, and the increasing Catholic population created overcrowding. Student evaluations showed that even when affected by these factors, Catholic school students had "good" and "middling" grade scores. As Catholic school enrolment increased at the turn of the century, there was a need for more teachers. At the same time, there were many catholic women graduating with a catholic school education and were prepared by their sisters to teach. It became a cycle of Catholic school graduates teaching at Catholic schools. In 1890 Toronto, 90% of the teachers were clergy, but by the 1910s, one third of the teachers were laypeople.

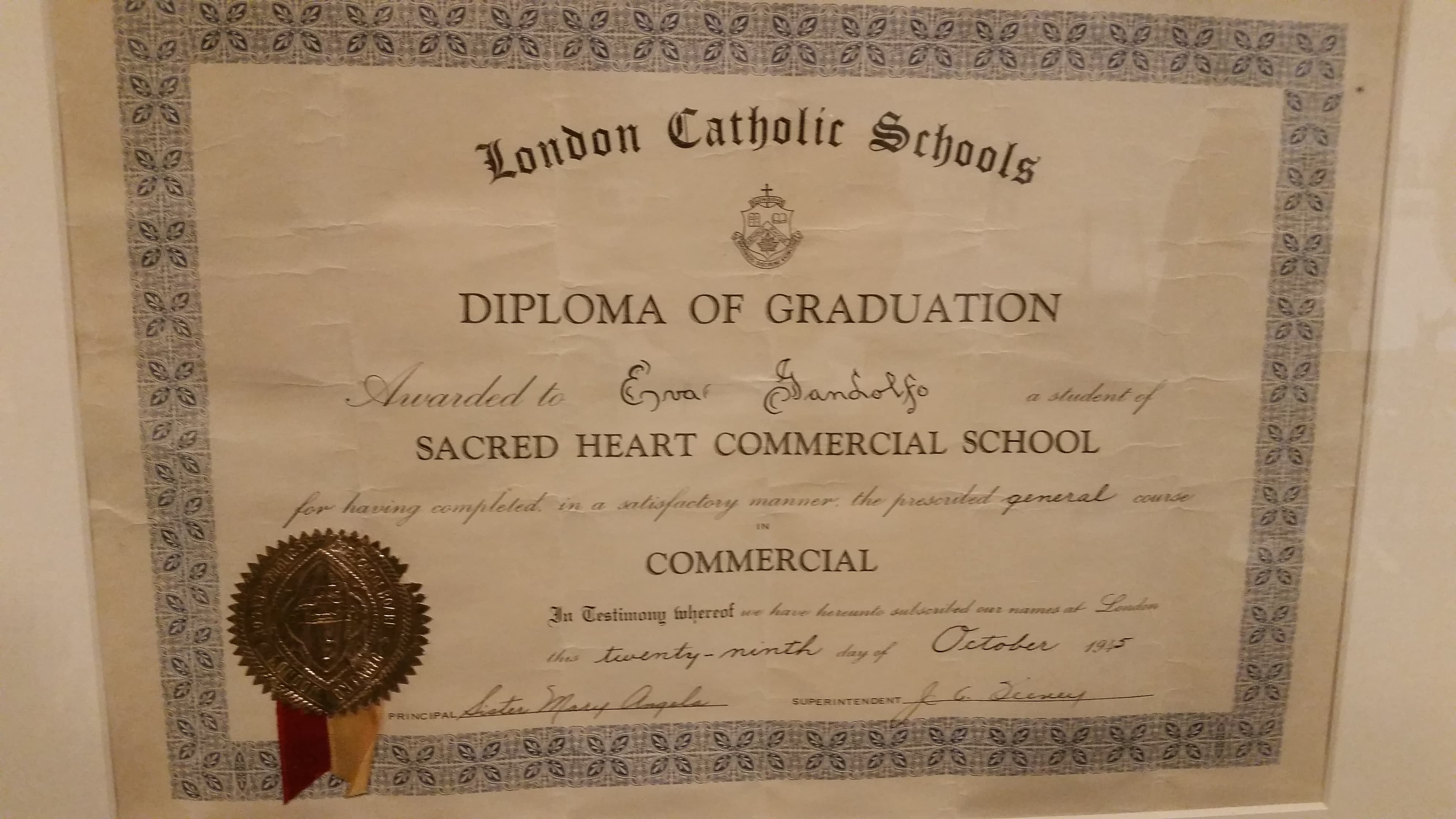
This London, Ontario, Catholic School Diploma was given certified in 1915. It represents the use of education to maintain a Catholic identity.

Canada after the First World War had a strong economy, so the production of more Catholic and public schools increased; however, the provincial government did not fund Catholic schools after grade 10. This was changed by Archbishop Neil McNeil, who argued that there was a constitutional right to grants and government funding for grades 11, 12, and 13 too. His argument was that Catholic schools taught material similarly to public schools, and because the constitution recognized high school education as an extension of public schools and Catholic education as a form of public school education, they had a constitutional right. This was still denied by the government.

In the 1930s, strong amendments to Catholic allocation of business and corporate taxes were made. The Catholic Taxpayers Association (CTA) began lobbying the provincial government for better allocation. In 1934, supported provincial Liberal Mitchell Hepburn (Ontario Premier from 1934 - 1942). After he won, he amended the corporation tax system to include the Separate School Board. This was short lived. After a terrible by-election in December 1936, Hepburn repealed the amendments because he was afraid of repercussions from the Protestant majority of the province.

After the Second World War, Canadian education systems started leaning towards fair and equality-based ideologies. In 1946, Catholic school systems argued again for provincial grants for grades 11–13. This was based on equality for education, and they argued that each school system should receive the same opportunities for funding. This backfired on the Catholic school system's funding opportunities. Over the course of four years, the school system put together a proposal report, and the Provincial Government investigated the schools. By 1950, the provincial government put forward legislation to cap the public funding for Catholic schools at grade 6, rather than the previous cap at grade 10. The Foundation Tax Plan from 1963 was quintessential in helping the Catholic school system gain equality to the public-school system. The plan allotted for more Catholic school grant money as recompense; Catholic schools could not tax most corporations.

Funding was still difficult for Catholic high schools in the late 20th century. After World War Two, there was also another increase in immigration from eastern and southern Europe. With a larger Catholic population, the provincial government started to investigate public funding opportunities. In 1964, the provincial government took more control over school funding from the municipal and regional governments. After the 1950s, and with the greater provincial control in the 1960s, Catholic schools could no longer use the corporation tax.

In 1969, county and district school boards replaced the local ones, which made distributing public funds far easier and more efficient. There was a regimented system that allowed for fair distribution. In the 1971 provincial election, Conservative Premier William Davis did not support funding, while the Liberal and New Democratic candidates did. Unfortunately for the Catholics, Davis’ Conservative Party won the election and public funding for Catholic high schools remained unsupported. Davis’ argument was that public funding would set precedent for other Christian denominations to ask the same. Very oddly in 1984, Davis agreed to publicly fund Catholic high schools. Grade 13 was eliminated during Davis' reform, but by the end of the 20th century, Catholic schools were publicly funded from Kindergarten to Grade 12. His decision was caused by the Report of the Task Force on Education Policy. It was written by the Ontario Elementary Catholic Teachers' Association, which put pressure on Davis to make a final decision.

In 1985, the Conservative provincial government under Bill Davis introduced Bill 30, titled Act to Amend the Education Act 1986. This bill's goal was to extend the public funding for Catholic secondary schools to grade 13. The Bill went through a judicial ruling to ensure that it was consistent with the Constitution of Canada and the Canadian Charter of Rights and Freedoms. The decision was 3 in favour and 2 opposed, and by 1986, the bill was deemed constitutional. Funding for grade 13 began in 1987.

The Education Act, Ontario from 1974 made Catholic schools open to students who were Roman Catholics in the area. Through the latter half of the 20th century, Catholic populations in Ontario rose 5%, from 1961 (30%) to 1981 (35%). Although established by Irish immigrants, the more immigration and multiculturalism that grew in Ontario through the 20th century, broadened the Catholic schools to other national forms of Catholicism. Between 1960 and 1980, Catholic school enrolment went from 33% of the public-school enrolment to over 50%. Between 1971 and 1984, 41 new Catholic schools were created, making the total number 98.

=== Catholicism and immigration ===
Immigration to Canada of Catholic nationalities other than Irish and French aided in respect for Catholicism, and the development of Catholic schools. By 1920, 45% (3.5 million) Canadians were Catholic. This was a result of the mass migration to Canada before World War One. These Catholic immigrants included those from Ukraine, Greece, and Italy. These immigrant Catholics decreased the percentage of Irish-Canadian Catholics from 25% to 17%. The French still made up two thirds of Canadian Catholics, but the growing immigrant population coincided with a growing Catholic population. After WWI finished, close to 50% of Canadian Catholics were non-Irish and French Canadian Catholics.

By 1920, 450,000 Ukrainians, Germans, Poles, Italians, and other Catholic nationalities had immigrated to Canada. Most of Canada's immigrated Catholic population settled in the Prairies, with Manitoba, Saskatchewan, and Alberta having the most ethnically diverse Catholic dioceses. The Ukrainian population was expansive in Canada's prairies. By 1912, they had 21 clergy members for about 100,000 people. With a group of 40,000 by 1914, German Catholics were another population that settled in the prairies. The prairies were a popular settlement area for new immigrants because it offered copious amounts of land and job opportunities as farmers.

In Ontario, immigrants were attracted to industrial work in cities like Toronto, or mining and forestry work in the north. In Thunder Bay, Ukrainians and Italians worked in the transportation industry with the railroad, and in the iron industry with foundries. As these immigrant groups developed, they began to establish churches and dioceses. These parishes developed slowly. By 1917, Italians in Sault Ste Marie finally received a priest and a church. Although the great migration pre-WWI and continued migration after increased the Catholic population of Canada, they were still a minority group, and thinly spread throughout the nation.

In 1920s Toronto and Ottawa, there was a 1,200 person Italian population from both northern and southern areas of Italy. Other than the prairies, 5,000 Ukrainians, 2,000 Poles, and over 100 Lithuanians settled in 1920s Toronto. The war gave immigrants access to a wider range of jobs. This raised their income for the four years, and allowed them to build more churches in Ontario cities. I 1914 Hamilton, the 1,700 Pole population built their church. A Polish Catholic church was built in 1914 St. Catharines, but after the war it closed down because of decreased attendance. In 1917, Ukrainians built churches in Kitchener, Hamilton, Oshawa, and Ottawa. Within a twenty-year period (1900 to 1920), the development of immigrant Catholic churches across Canada grew at a severely fast rate. As Catholic immigration intensified, the desire for a stronger Catholic school system increased too.

=== Tensions: English and French ===
The bilingual school conflict between Ontarian English and French Catholics occurred primarily in Ottawa. The city is located on the border between Ontario and Quebec, and represented strong Irish and Franco-Catholic tensions. Joseph-Thomas Duhamel, who was the Catholic diocesan Bishop of Ottawa from 1874 to 1909, was considered to be "the defender" for Franco-Catholic Ontarians. He was adamant about the importance of bilingualism in the Church.

Tensions rose in 1868, when Archbishop John Joseph Lynch from Toronto argued that the Anglo Franco-Catholic problem in Ottawa was caused by the location. The issue with the diocese of Ottawa's location was twofold. First, it encompassed more than just Ottawa. It ranged both east and west of the city. Second, because of Ottawa's proximity to the border, it was a part of the Ecclesiastical Province of Quebec. This gave Ottawa duel Catholic identities, and Lynch argued that the easiest way to solve this problem was to divide the diocese of Ottawa down the Ontario-Quebec border, and merge the Ontarian side with the diocese of Toronto. Because of his connection to Franco-Ontarian Catholics, Dunhamel fought hard against this assertion. Dunhamel and Lynch fought back and forth with the Vatican about this divide for two decades (1870s and 1880s).

Archbishop of Quebec E.A. Taschereau argued against Lynch, stating that the ecclesiastical borders for Catholic Canada were to aid the cultural identity issues, attempting to group together the majority of one Catholic-cultural identity. The Ecclesiastical Province of Quebec contained the French, the Ecclesiastical Province of Ontario contained the English, and the Ecclesiastical Province of Saint-Boniface contained the Indigenous Catholics. Taschereau explained that when the divide was created, most Catholics in Ottawa were French, and so it was compartmentalized to the Ecclesiastical Province of Quebec. The number of French Catholics was still strong, and so Taschereau argued that Ottawa should stay with Quebec. National and language identities caused strong tensions within the Catholic Church of Canada. Lynch, an Irishman, and Dunhamel, a French supporter, fought these tensions for the rest of their lives. These tensions played out in Catholic Schools.

In the late 1800s, there were many French migrants coming from Quebec to Ontario, making the Irish Catholics, who were the previous majority, left to contend with a growing French population. There was an interesting difference in prejudice from both Irish Catholics and Anglo-Protestants towards bilingual Catholic schools in Ontario. Irish Catholics did not like French Catholic schools because it went against their language. Anglo-Protestants did not like French-Catholic schools because it went against language and religion. The problems and tensions between Public and Separate School systems, and the problems and tensions between English and bilingual schools were different, but they often worked in tandem. Most bilingual schools were religiously affiliated, and so the growing stigma against bilingual schools and the Franco-Ontarians often transposed to stigmas against the Separate School system.

Ottawa's bilingual schools experienced a lot of controversy. In the 1880s, the bilingual schools were debated by the Ottawa Separate School Board. Extreme tension rose between English and French School Board trustees. Bishop Duhamel interfered and resolved the conflict. He decided that Ottawa's Separate School Board would separate into a French Separate School Board and English Separate School Board. In 1912, the provincial government wrote a report titled the Merchant Report. Those who wrote the report, recommended having "French be the language of instruction in the primary grades, but ... English be introduced gradually ... to replace French as the main language by the third form" as an attempt to solve the bilingual school problem. Conservative Premier James Whitney enacted this recommendation in his policy statement: "... instruction in English shall commence at once upon a child entering school, the use of French as the language of instruction and of communication to vary according to local conditions upon the report of the supervising inspector, but in no case to continues beyond the end of the first form." This piece of legislation would be the precursor to Regulation 17.

Regulation 17 was issued in June 1912. For those unable to speak English well were placed into a newly created English course that was tailored for them. Teachers who could not effectively teach English were fired Regulation made all schools in Ontario English speaking and taught. The Franco-Ontarian issue with Regulation 17 was the restriction of French rights in Ontario, particularly when there was a growing French population.

The tensions were eventually semi-resolved. In 1967, Premier John P. Robarts gave Franco-Ontarians access and funding to French-language education. This set a series of events in motion that concluded in 1988, when French Catholic and French public-school boards were separated in Ottawa. This gave precedent for multiple French school boards in other areas of Ontario with large French populations.

=== Tensions: Catholic and public schools ===
People often thought that Catholic school education was not on par with public school education, but when Catholics went to public high schools after graduating Catholic elementary schools, they were able to do well and understand the material. The quality of Catholic school education was improving, and comments against was most likely due to rivalry between the two education systems or religious bigotry. Although religious material was crucial to Catholic schools’ curriculum, during the 1960s, the opposite was happening in public schools. School prayer was removed and the growing diversity in urban Ontario was creating a more secular environment.

After gaining equal funding for Catholic schools in 1984, the Catholic schools then began to open their enrolment to the general public. There was debate over this idea. Many Catholics were against this idea. Many clergy worried that the integrity of the Catholic school system would diminish with the presence of non-Catholic students. In the 1960s, public schools started to become more secular, so the worry that the same would happen in the Catholic school system was not without precedent.

When the equal funding for Catholic schools was enacted, many public school supporters argued that public funding for Catholic schools was unfair to other denominations. They argued that it was a form of religious persecution. While not a Christian denomination, a similar argument was voiced by Jewish communities who felt alienated by this legislation. Both sides worried about how to balance Catholic identity and the growing multicultural Canadian identity in a school with both Catholic and non-Catholic students. The public schools were different because they did not have a religiously based curriculum embedded in their ideology.

The only political party with seats in the Ontario Provincial Parliament that supports the merging of Catholic and secular public school boards is the Green Party.

== See also ==
- Catholic Church in Canada
