= Serbian-Jewish Friendship Society =

The Serbian-Jewish Friendship Society was founded in Belgrade, Serbia in 1987 by Klara Mandić, who was also the society's spokesperson. The society was formed with the professed primary goal to promote establishment of full diplomatic relations between Israel and Yugoslavia, an act which had previously been stymied by Tito's regime.

Born to Jewish parents at a concentration camp in Italy in 1944 and later orphaned, Mandić was adopted in Belgrade by a Serb family in 1945. The society has been criticised in some quarters for allegedly promoting a revisionist view of the roles of Jews and Serbs as equal victims and sufferers of persecution.

In 1992, Mandić gave the American Jewish press a controversial account of Croatian forces killing a sixty-seven-year-old Jewish woman named Ankica Konjuh. It was later claimed that this account was false and that Konjuh was neither Jewish, nor was she killed by Croats, rather Konjuh was a Croat killed by Serbs. In December 1991, the Federation of Jewish Communities of Yugoslavia distanced itself from Mandić's claims.

She reportedly was a close associate of both Radovan Karadžić and Željko Ražnatović (known as "Arkan"), both later accused of war crimes in Croatia by the ICTY (International War Crimes Tribunal for Yugoslavia). Mandić was murdered in Belgrade in May 2001 shortly after the overthrow of Slobodan Milošević.

== Sources ==
- "Fascism Reawakens in Croatia, Charges Jewish Leader", The Jewish Advocate, 24–30 January 1992

== See also ==
- Serb propaganda
- Serbian Unity Congress
