= Diaspora politics =

Political behavior of transnational ethnic diasporas

Diaspora politics is the political behavior of transnational ethnic diasporas, their relationship with their ethnic homelands and their host states, and their prominent role in ethnic conflicts. The study of diaspora politics is part of the broader field of diaspora studies.

To understand a diaspora's politics, one must first understand its historical context and attachments. A diaspora is a transnational community that defined itself as a singular ethnic group based upon its shared identity. Diasporas result from historical emigration from an original homeland. In modern cases, this migration can be historically documented, and the diaspora associated with a certain territory. Whether this territory is in fact the homeland of a specific ethnic group, is a political matter. The older the migration, the less evidence there is for the event: in the case of the Romani people the migration, the homeland, and the migration route have not yet been accurately determined. A claim to a homeland always has political connotations and is often disputed.

Self-identified diasporas place great importance on their homeland, because of their ethnic and cultural association with it, especially if it has been 'lost' or 'conquered'. That has led ethnic nationalist movements within several diasporas, often resulting in the establishment of a sovereign homeland. However, even when they are established, it is rare for the complete diaspora population to return to the homeland, and the remaining diaspora community typically retains significant emotional attachment to the homeland, and the co-ethnic population there.

Ethnic diaspora communities are now recognized by scholars as "inevitable" and "endemic" features of the international system, writes Yossi Shain and Tamara Cofman Wittes, for the following reasons:

1. First, within each of a diaspora's host states, resident members can organize domestically to maximize their political clout.
2. Second, a diaspora can exert significant pressure in its homeland's domestic political arena regarding issues of diaspora concern.
3. Lately, a diaspora's transnational community can engage directly with third-party states and international organizations, in effect bypassing its homeland and host state governments.

Diasporas are thus perceived as transnational political entities, operating on "behalf of their entire people" and capable of acting independently from any individual state (their homeland or their host states).

== See also ==
- Non-resident citizen voting
- African diaspora
- Diaspora politics in the United States
- Golus nationalism
- Identity politics
- Irredentism
- Tibetan independence movement
- Transnationalism
- Right to homeland
- Right of return
- White genocide
- Zionism
