= Serbian Unity Congress =

- Logo
- Formation: 1990
- Purpose: Diaspora
- Headquarters: Washington, DC
- Region served: North America
- Official language: English, Serbian

The Serbian Unity Congress is a non-profit Serb diaspora international organization. It was established in 1990 in response to the political events in Yugoslavia. Its stated long-term goal is to contribute to democratization and reconstruction of the Serbian territories. With its main office located in Washington, DC, the Serbian Unity Congress also has an office in Belgrade, Serbia and representation in Vienna, Austria and through its worldwide chapters.

== See also ==
- Serbian Americans
- Ethnic interest groups in the United States
