= Right to homeland =

Human right

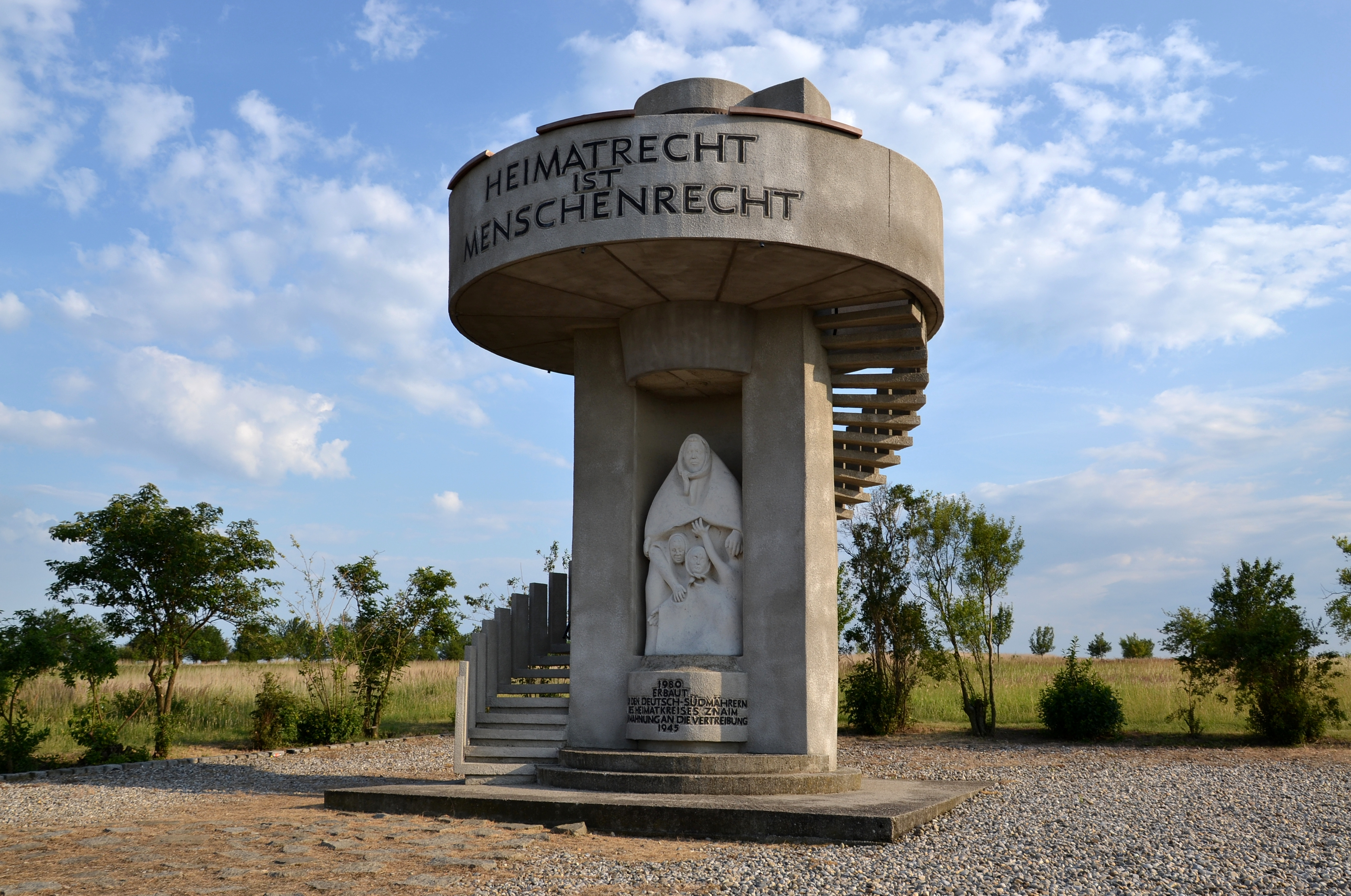
Memorial near the former Znaim to the Sudeten expellees of South Moravia (Kreis Znaim). The text translates as "Homeland rights are human rights."

The right to homeland is according to some legal scholars a universal human right, which is derived from the Universal Declaration of Human Rights, including its Article 9. The concept evolved in German jurisprudence and is recognized in German constitutional law to a certain degree. Notable proponents of the concept include legal scholars Kurl Rabl, Rudolf Laun, Otto Kimminich, Dieter Blumenwitz, Felix Ermacora and Alfred-Maurice de Zayas. The concept is relevant to debates concerning ethnic cleansing in Europe after World War II (notably of Germans and Hungarians), ethnic cleansing in Palestine, Cyprus and other areas.

In migration studies, sociologist Cenk Saraçoğlu has proposed the right to homeland as a framework for addressing forced displacement, emphasizing people's collective capacity to shape the social conditions of the places where they live and work. His approach connects displacement to broader processes of dispossession and presents the right to homeland as a basis for shared political claims across the citizen–refugee divide.

== See also ==
- Aboriginal title
- Diaspora politics
- Ethnic federalism
- Expulsion of the Chagossians
- Hawaiian homeland
- Home rule
- Jewish homeland
- Right of return
- Right to exist
- Nation state
- Blood and soil
