= Foreign policy interest group =

A foreign policy interest group, according to Thomas Ambrosio, is a domestic advocacy group which seeks to directly or indirectly influence their government's foreign policy.

== Historic development ==
"Beginning in the early 1970s and continuing into the post-Cold War era, the U.S. foreign policy-making system has been transformed from the relatively closed and presidential dominated system of the early cold war into a more open, contentious, and pluralistic system. The president remains the most powerful actor, but he now must contend with an active Congress, oversee a complex executive bureaucracy, and respond to pressures and ideas generated by the press, think tanks, and public opinion. During this period, there also has been a sharp increase in the number of interest groups actively seeking to influence U.S. foreign policy. These interest groups have mobilized to represent a diverse array of business, labor, ethnic, human rights, environmental, and other organizations. Thus, on most issues, the contemporary foreign policy-making system has become more similar to its domestic policy-making counterpart, with multiple interest groups using multiple channels to try to influence policy choices."

== Tactics ==
Foreign policy interest groups, according to John Dietrich, are able to have "an impact on the earlier stages of the decision making process" via the following three general, yet effective, tactics:

=== Framing the issues ===
Framing, Ambrosio describes, is "the attempt by interest groups to place an issue on the government's agenda, shape perspectives of that issue, and influence the terms of debate."

=== Offering information and analysis ===
Framing is closely connected to with supplying information and analysis, according to Ambrosio, because of "the large number and diversity of issues confronting [the staff of an elected representative], it is impossible for staffers to invest sufficient time to research issues themselves. Consequently, they are forced to rely on outside sources of information; interest groups provide this information, most likely with analysis (or "spin") beneficial to their agenda."

=== Monitoring the policy process and reacting as necessary ===
In addition to framing, supplying information and analysis, Ambrosio states that "interest groups closely monitor government policies pertaining to their agenda and react to those policies through" such actions as:

- "the dissemination of supplementary information,"
- "letter-writing campaigns,"
- "calls for hearings or additional legislation, [and]"
- "support or opposition of candidates during elections"

== See also ==
- Ethnic interest group
- Interest group
- Thinktank
