= Yossi Shain =

Israeli political scientist (born 1956)

- יוסי שיין
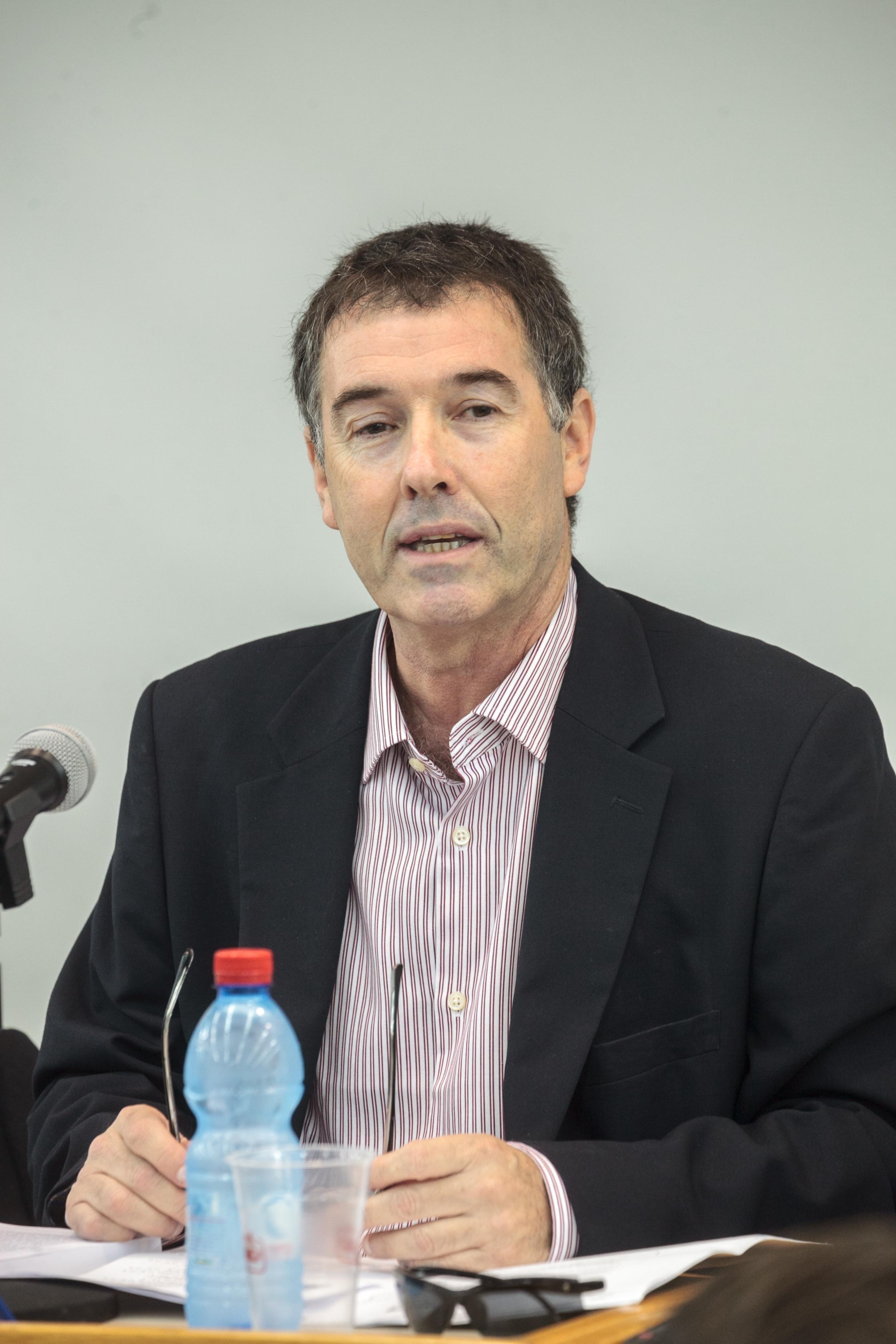
- Shain speaking at a conference

Faction represented in the Knesset
- 2019–2022: Yisrael Beiteinu

Personal details
- Born: 21 September 1956 (age 69) Kfar Saba, Israel

Yossi Shain (Hebrew: יוסי שיין; born 21 September 1956) is an Israeli Politician who served as a member of the Knesset for Yisrael Beiteinu between 2019 and 2022 He is also the Romulo Betancourt Professor of Political Science at Tel Aviv University where he also serves as head of TAU's School of Political Science, Government and International Affairs, head of the Abba Eban Graduate Studies Program in Diplomacy and director of the Frances Brody Institute for Applied Diplomacy. He is also a full professor of comparative government and diaspora politics at Georgetown University, and the founding director of the Program for Jewish Civilization (PJC) at Georgetown. In 2007, he also served (pro-bono) as president of Western Galilee College. Shain earned his B.A. (philosophy-1981 cum laude) and M.A. (political science-1983) degrees from Tel Aviv University and received his Ph.D. in political science (with distinction) from Yale University in 1988. In July 2016 Professor Shain was appointed as a member of Council for Higher Education in Israel, and he is now heading the national committee in charge in rejuvenating liberal arts and the humanities.

== Academic positions ==
Since 1989, he has taught political science at Tel Aviv University, where he served as department chair from 1996 to 1999 and again from 2013. He was also head of the Hartog School of Government from 2003 to 2007 and co-director (with Peter Berkowitz) of the Israel Program on Constitutional Government 2003-2008. Shain also held many visiting appointments, including at Sciences Po in Paris, Yale University, Wesleyan University, the Fletcher School of Law and Diplomacy, and Middlebury College. He was also a visiting fellow at St. Antony's College, Oxford University, and senior visiting fellow at the Center of International Studies at Princeton University. Shain has lectured around the world and was honored as the David and Goldie Blanksteen in Jewish Ethics at Yale Law School (2000), as Olin Lecturer at the Harvard Lecturer Academy (2002) and as the Aaron and Cecile Goldman Chair at Georgetown (three consecutive times 1999-2002).

== Academic contributions ==
In 2010 he was mentioned as “perhaps the most prolific scholar in the discipline (of International Relations) on the issue of Diasporas.” Outside the academy he has been involved in many projects and served on national and international committees related to corruption, national security and Diaspora, migration policies and Government reform. He worked with NGOs in Israel, the U.S., the U.K., Mexico, and Armenia, and served for three years as President of the Israeli Local Government Conference. His scholarly awards includes: the American Political Science Association’s Helen Dwight Reed Award (for the best dissertation in International Relations), International Fulbright Award, Israel’s Alon Fellowship for distinguished young scholars and the Erasmus Mundus award by the EU. He received grants and awards from the French and German governments for his work on nationalism, ethnicity, and Diaspora politics, from the SSRC, the Bradley Foundation and from the Center for Democracy (in Washington).

Shain’s latest book The Language of Corruption and Israel’s Moral Culture appeared in Hebrew in 2010 and received national acclaim (English edition forthcoming). He is also the author of The Frontier of Loyalty: Political Exiles in the Age of the Nation-State (first edition 1989; new edition University of Michigan Press, 2005); Between States: Interim Governments and Democratic Transitions (with Juan J. Linz) (Cambridge University Press 1995); Marketing the American Creed Abroad: Diasporas in the U.S. and Their Homelands (Cambridge University Press 1999), the book was awarded the 2000 Best Book of the Year Prize by the Israeli Political Science Association; and Kinship and Diasporas in International Affairs (University of Michigan Press 2007). He also edited Governments-in-Exile in Contemporary World Politics (Routledge, 1991), and co-edited Democracy: The Challenges Ahead (with Aharon Kleiman, St. Martin’s, 1997) and Power and the Past: Collective Memory in International Affairs (with Eric Langenbacher, Georgetown University Press, 2010). Shain is now working on a book manuscript (with Sarah Fainberg) entitled, The Israelization of Judaism to be accompanied by a documentary.

Shain has also published over 50 scholarly articles in academic journals and edited books. His articles have appeared in (among others) International Organization, Comparative Politics, Foreign Policy, International Affairs, Orbis, Political Science Q, The Journal of Democracy, The Journal of Political Science, Government and Opposition, and Nations and Nationalism.

== Public service, journalistic writing, and media ==
Shain served as special adviser to Israel's Minister of Foreign Affairs. He is a regular contributor to the op-ed page of Israel's leading daily Yediot Achronot, and has contributed numerous essays to other newspapers and magazines (including The New York Times, The American Interest, The Foreign Service Journal, New Haven Register, Ha’aretz, and the Jerusalem Post). Shain is also a nationally known commentator on Israeli television and radio. He has been a guest on many political news shows in Europe and the US, including the BBC, NBC, ABC, CNN, Fox News, CNBC, PBS, Al-Jazeera, and The News Hour.

== Ideas ==
According to Shain's recent book The Language of Corruption in Israel’s Moral Culture (in Hebrew), the Israeli judicial approach is counterproductive. It creates the impression that Israeli politics suffers from rampant corruption. This undermines the public’s trust in politics and politicians without addressing the real problem. Instead of a blanket prohibition against all political appointments, a more nuanced approach is in order, one that recognizes the realities of political life.

In their Diasporas and International Relations Theory, Yossi Shain and Aharon Barth incorporate the study of diasporas into international relations (IR) theory by focusing on diasporas as independent actors who actively influence their homeland (kin-state) foreign policies. Shain and Barth argue that diasporic influences can best be understood by situating them in the 'theoretical space' shared by constructivism and liberalism; two approaches that acknowledge the impact of identity and domestic politics on international behavior.

In his September 2014 article "The Two Faces of Qatar" in The American Interest, Shain develops his concerns regarding Qatar. He observes that "For years Qatar has played a brilliant a double game between Islamism and the West, offering aid and comfort for the forces of the former while doing the bare minimum asked of it by the latter," yet Shain asks "whether this act beginning to wear thin?" Shain observes, that "recent events, however, have not all been favorable to Qatar’s strategy. In particular, the fall of the Muslim Brotherhood and the rise of Al-Sisi in Egypt were shattering blows to Qatar’s view of the Middle East. With the Muslim Brothers being the bitter enemies of the Egyptian regime, Egypt has also turned on its prime backers, the Qataris. And in Egypt today, Al Jazeera has developed a reputation as traitor to the Arab cause, and the Emir of Qatar as an instigator of radicalism and terror. Reporting on the crackdown on the Muslim Brotherhood in Egypt last February, Gregg Carlstrom noted how Al Jazeera became the mouthpiece of radical Jihadi views—featuring guests openly calling for an assault on the Egyptian Coptic minority. None of this, of course, made it into Al Jazeera English."

== Books ==
- Shain, Y, The Israeli Century: How the Zionist Revolution Changed History and Reinvented Judaism, trans. Eylon Levy (Wicked Son: 2021)
- Shain, Y. & Fainberg, S. The Israelization of Judaism (book and documentary film in progress)
- Shain, Y. (2010). Śefat ha-sheḥitut ṿe-tarbut ha-musar ha-Yiśreelit (Who Controls Morality in Democracies: The Language of Corruption and Its Consequences (in preparation an English amended version of the Hebrew book). Or Yehudah: Devir. שפת השחיתות ותרבות המוסר הישראלית (דביר: 2010)
- Shain, Y., & Langenbacher, E. (2010). Power and the Past: Collective Memory and International Relations. Washington, D.C: Georgetown University Press (edited).
- Shain, Y. (2007). Kinship & Diasporas in International Affairs. Ann Arbor: University of Michigan Press.
- Shain, Y. (1999). Marketing the American Creed Abroad: Diasporas in the U.S. and Their Homelands. Cambridge, UK: Cambridge University Press.
- Shain, Y., & Klieman, A. S. (1997). Democracy: The Challenges Ahead. New York: St. Martin's Press (edited).
- Shain, Y., Linz, J. J., (1995). Between States: Interim Governments and Democratic Transitions. Cambridge [England: Cambridge University Press. (Two volumes: Vol. 1: Theory. Vol. 2 is edited under the name Case Studies).
- Shain, Y. (1991). Governments-in-Exile in Contemporary World Politics. New York: Routledge (edited).
- Shain, Y. (1989; 2005 new and revised edition). The Frontier of Loyalty: Political Exiles in the Age of the Nation-State. Ann Arbor: University of Michigan Press. Translated to Hebrew by Aha'aron Amir in 2006.

== See also ==
- Diaspora politics in the United States
