= Ukrainians in Canada for Democratic Ukraine =

Ukrainians of Canada for Democratic Ukraine logo

Ukrainians in Canada for Democratic Ukraine is a public initiative established in Canada in March 2014 during the Russian Federation's invasion of the territory of the Autonomous Republic Crimea, Ukraine.

The objectives of the initiative are cooperation with the governments of Canada and Ukraine, as well as with media and voluntary organizations of both countries, in order to support Ukraine against Russia in the Russo-Ukrainian War. The initiative also encourages residents of Canada, namely residents of Ukrainian origin, to participate in public events to support Ukraine, gathered by Ukrainian organizations in Canada, as well as fundraising for Ukrainian army and volunteer battalions of Ukraine.

Currently, the public initiative involves 348 participants, mostly residents of Montreal, Quebec, Canada.

In October 2014, the Minister of Foreign Affairs of Canada, Hon. John Baird addressed to the initiative, in his letter, he provided detailed information on the sanctions imposed by Canada against Russian Federation, noting that sanctions imposed by Canada are the most powerful among the sanctions imposed by other counties and assured to continue the support of Ukraine by Canada.

In response to the Minister of Foreign Affairs of Canada Hon. John Baird the public initiative described the importance of urgent action in view of possible intensification of Russian military forces activity in the Ukrainian East, and asked to consider possibility to provide medical equipment to Ukrainian hospitals where the injured participants of Anti Terrorist Operation are treated, 12 hospitals are mentioned in the letter from different Ukrainian cities, mainly Kyiv and Dnipro, with a list of medical equipment that is urgently needed. This information was gathered by means of Ukrainian volunteer communities, sources in the Ministry of Health of Ukraine and in Dnipropetrovsk Regional State Administration.
