= Thomas Ambrosio =

21st-century American political scientist

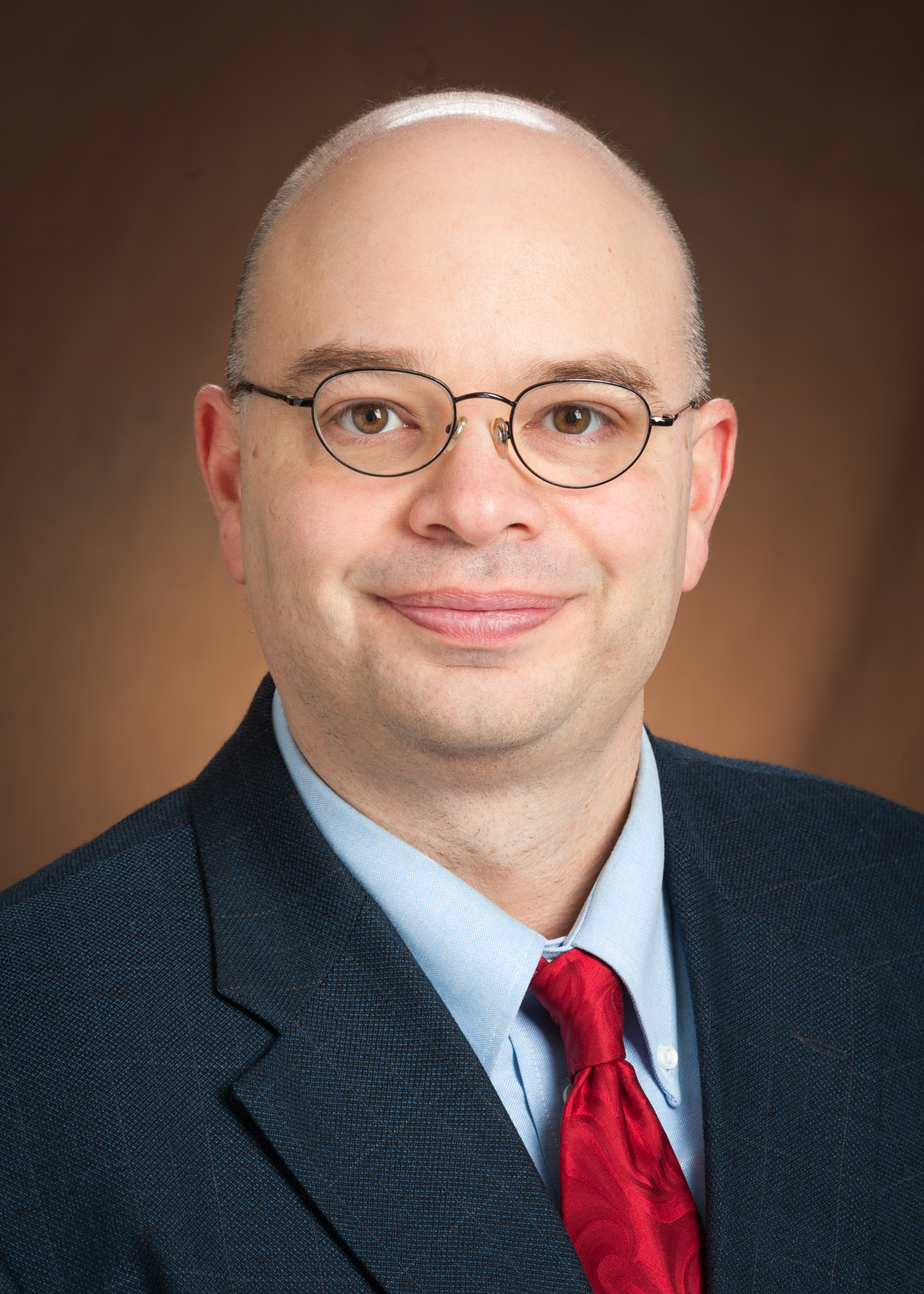
- Born: May 31, 1971 (age 55)

Academic background
- Education: University of Virginia
- Thesis: Irredentism: Ethnic Conflict and International Politics (2000)

Thomas Ambrosio is a professor of political science in the Department of Political Science and Public Policy at North Dakota State University. He teaches courses on terrorism, international relations, international law, and international criminal law.

== Career ==
Ambrosio received his B.A. from Trenton State College (now, the College of New Jersey) and his PhD in foreign affairs in 2000 from the University of Virginia.

Ambrosio taught at Western Kentucky University from 1999 to 2000, and has since then taught at North Dakota State University, where he is a professor with tenure. He was Department Head of Criminal Justice and Political Science from 2019 to 2020.

Ambrosio received the NDSU College of Arts, Humanities, and Social Sciences 'Outstanding Research' award in 2007, along with the 'Distinguished Educator's Award' from the NDSU chapter of the Blue Key National Honor Society. He was the director of NDSU's International Studies Major from 2009 to 2014. In 2011, he also earned the NDSU College of Arts, Humanities, and Social Sciences 'Outstanding Educator' award. In 2017 he received the NDSU College of Arts, Humanities, and Social Sciences 'Outstanding Service' award.

On 18 April 2018, Ambrosio delivered the NDSU Faculty Lectureship, which recognizes sustained professional excellence in teaching, scholarly achievement, and service among current faculty at NDSU. The Faculty Lectureship is conferred on an individual who has demonstrated excellence in all three areas. His presentation was entitled "A New, New World Order: America's Challenges in a Post-American International System".

== Publications ==
Ambrosio's publications include three books, two edited volumes, and over fifty journal articles and book chapters. His research interests include ludic (game) studies, authoritarianism, and geopolitics.

Some of his more recent articles include:

- “The Wicked Problems of This War of Mine: Exploring Ethical Dilemmas Through Boardgaming,” Northern Plains Ethics Journal, vol.11, no.1 (Fall 2023): 73–104.
- “Performing the Cold War through the ‘the Best Board Game on the Planet’: The Ludic Geopolitics of Twilight Struggle,” Geopolitics, vol.28, no.2 (2023), 846-878. With Jonathan Ross (second author).
- "The War on Terror Beyond the Barrel of a Gun: The Procedural Rhetorics of the Boardgame Labyrinth,” Media, War & Conflict vol.16, no.4 (2022): 495–515. With Jonathan Ross (second author).
- “Belarus, Kazakhstan and Alliance Security Dilemmas in the Former Soviet Union: Intra-Alliance Threat and Entrapment After the Ukraine Crisis,” Europe-Asia Studies vol.72, no.9 (2022): 1700–1728.

Ambrosio's most recently completed book project was Authoritarian Backlash: Russian Resistance to Democratization in the Former Soviet Union. It examines five strategies that an increasingly authoritarian Russia has adopted to preserve the Kremlin's political power: insulate, bolster, subvert, redefine and coordinate.

== Books ==
- Russian Resistance to Democratization in the Former Soviet Union. 2009. ISBN 0-7546-7350-2
- Challenging America's Global Preeminence: Russia's Quest for Multipolarity. 2005. ISBN 0-7546-4289-5
- Ethnic Identity Groups and U.S. Foreign Policy. (as editor and contributor) 2002. ISBN 0-275-97532-0
- International Law and the Rise of Nations. (as co-editor, with Robert J. Beck, and contributor) 2001. ISBN 1-889119-30-X
- Irredentism: Ethnic Conflict and International Politics. 2000. ISBN 0-275-97260-7
