= LGBTQ rights in Guatemala =

- Guatemala
- Legal status: Legal since 1871
- Gender identity: Transgender people are unable to legally change gender
- Military: No

Family rights
- Recognition of relationships: No recognition of same-sex couples
- Adoption: No

Lesbian, gay, bisexual, transgender and queer (LGBT) people in Guatemala face legal challenges not experienced by non-LGBTQ residents. Both male and female forms of same-sex sexual activity are legal in Guatemala.

Sexual orientation and gender identity are not expressly included in the country's non-discrimination laws and same-sex couples and households headed by same-sex couples are not eligible for the same legal protections available to opposite-sex married couples. A majority of Guatemalans affiliate with the Catholic Church or Pentecostal churches. As such, attitudes towards members of the LGBT community tend to reflect prevailing religious mores. Additionally, Guatemala is legally bound to the January 2018 Inter-American Court of Human Rights ruling, which held that same-sex marriage and the recognition of one's gender identity on official documents are human rights protected by the American Convention on Human Rights.

== Legality of same-sex sexual activity ==
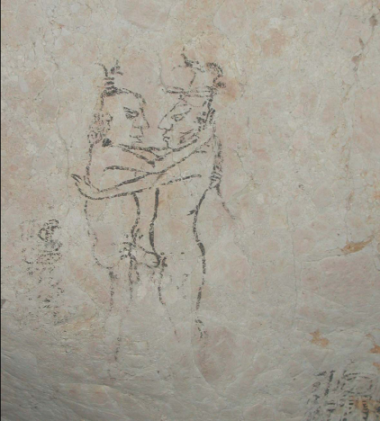
A Mayan cave painting of two men engaging in sexual acts, located in Naj Tunich

The Mayan civilization, present in Guatemala before Spanish arrival, was tolerant of homosexuality. There was a strong association between ritual and homosexual activity. Some shamans engaged in homosexual acts with their patients, and priests engaged in ritualized homosexual acts with their gods.

Following Spanish conquest and the incorporation of modern-day Guatemala into the Viceroyalty of New Spain, sodomy became punished with burning at the stake. Christianity, which has traditionally regarded homosexuality as sinful, was also introduced to the region, and thus the relative openness surrounding homosexuality disappeared.

Consensual, non-commercial, private same-sex sexual activity has been legal in Guatemala since 1871.

== Recognition of same-sex relationships ==
There is no legal recognition for same-sex couples in the form of same-sex marriage or in the more limited form of civil unions or domestic partnership arrangements. Former President Álvaro Colom supported civil unions for same-sex couples. In December 2016, Deputy Sandra Morán along with various groups announced the introduction of a civil unions bill in the Congress of Guatemala. Morán acknowledged that her proposal would be strongly criticized by conservative groups, but argued that "society is not only made up of these people, but also people who think differently." Additionally, she urged the modernization of Guatemala on issues of recognition and support to all citizens.The bill has not been debated since.

=== 2018 Inter-American Court of Human Rights advisory opinion ===
On 9 January 2018, the Inter-American Court of Human Rights (IACHR) issued an advisory opinion that parties to the American Convention on Human Rights should grant same-sex couples "accession to all existing domestic legal systems of family registration, including marriage, along with all rights that derive from marriage".

While the advisory opinion was welcomed by human rights groups; the Catholic Church, religious groups and conservative organizations expressed opposition. Constitutional lawyers have urged the Government to abide by the opinion. In response to the IACHR ruling, several government lawmakers introduced a so-called "life and protection" bill, which would increase penalties for abortion and would explicitly ban same-sex marriage. If passed, the bill would criminalise women who have miscarriages (which according to certain statistics from the United States National Library of Medicine is as high as 30% of all pregnancies), and would define the family as "being a father, a mother and children". Moreover, the bill establishes that "freedom of conscience and expression" protects people from being "obliged to accept non-heterosexual conduct or practices as normal." It has also attracted further criticism, as it erroneously and unscientifically describes homosexuality as "being contrary to biology and genetics". The bill has already passed its first and second readings, and requires a final third reading, a reading of every individual article, and lastly a signature from the President. President Jimmy Morales has expressed support for the proposal, saying: "I remind the people of Guatemala that their institutions and their officials, according to Article 156 of the Political Constitution of the Republic, are not obligated to follow illegal orders. Guatemala and our government believe in life. Our government and Guatemala believe in the family based in the marriage of man and woman." His usage of the term "illegal" is factually incorrect, as Guatemala, like most Latin American countries, has taken an oath to uphold international law, respect human rights, and follow the jurisdiction and jurisprudence of the Inter-American Court of Human Rights.

==== Initiative 5272 ====
In response to the IACHR opinion, several congressional lawmakers introduced Initiative 5272 or the Protection of Life and Family Act which would have increased penalties for abortion and explicitly ban same-sex marriage. If passed, the bill would have also criminalized women who have had miscarriages (which according to certain statistics from the United States National Library of Medicine is as high as 30% of all pregnancies), and would have defined the family as "being a father, a mother and children." Moreover, the bill established that "freedom of conscience and expression" protects people from being "obliged to accept non-heterosexual conduct or practices as normal." It had also attracted further criticism, as it erroneously and unscientifically described homosexuality as "being contrary to biology and genetics".

The bill passed its first and second readings, and required a final third reading, which consists of a reading of every individual article, and lastly a signature from the president. President Jimmy Morales expressed support for the proposal, saying: "I remind the people of Guatemala that their institutions and their officials, according to Article 156 of the Political Constitution of the Republic, are not obligated to follow illegal orders. Guatemala and our government believe in life. Our government and Guatemala believe in the family based in the marriage of man and woman." His usage of the term "illegal" is factually incorrect, as Guatemala, like most Latin American countries, has taken an oath to uphold international law, respect human rights, and follow the jurisdiction and jurisprudence of the Inter-American Court of Human Rights.

If enacted, the bill would have contravened international law with regards to same-sex marriage, specifically the American Convention on Human Rights. LGBT activists announced their intention to challenge the proposal to the Constitutional Court and, if necessary, to the Inter-American Court of Human Rights itself.

In September 2018, the bill's third reading was blocked, and it has not been debated in Congress since.

=== 2022 failed attempt to ban same-sex marriage ===
On March 9, 2022, the Guatemalan Congress approved Law 5272, which would have banned same-sex marriage, and in turn would have penalized abortion with 5 years in prison. Given the opposition generated by President Alejandro Giammattei to enact said law, announcing that he would veto it considering that it violated the Constitution and international agreements signed by Guatemala, the project was finally archived and discarded by Congress on March 15.

== Discrimination protections ==
Guatemala laws do not prohibit discrimination on the basis of sexual orientation or gender identity in areas such as employment, education, housing, health care, banking or other public accommodations, such as cafes, restaurants, nightclubs and cinemas. The sole exception to this occurred with the Código de la Niñez y la Juventud (Code on Childhood and Youth) approved in 1997, which safeguarded children and youth from discrimination based on various factors, including their sexual orientation and that of their parents. However, this protective measure was later repealed in 2003.

In May 2017, Deputy Sandra Morán presented a bill to Congress with the aim of reforming articles 27 and 202 of the Criminal Code to add sexual orientation and gender identity as protected categories.

== Gender identity and expression ==
Since 2016, transgender people in Guatemala can change their legal name so that it matches their gender identity, following judicial permission. However, they cannot change their legal gender.

In December 2017, a bill to recognize the right to gender identity and allow for transgender people to change their name and gender on birth certificates was introduced to Congress. In August 2018, both the Legislative and Constitutional Points Commission and the Women's Commission rejected the bill.

Bill 5490 was advanced in December of 2021, it aimed to remove education regarding transgender individuals in schools. The reasoning for this bill was to protect children and adolescents from “gender identity disorders”. The bill would also require censorship of media with transgender individuals. It was unanimously approved by the Congress’ on Education, Science, and Technology, and was moved forward to be reviewed again by the full congress. There have been signature campaigns to stop this bill, including one by “AllOutAction”, that has 17, 250 signatures as of November 2024.

From the 2023 Human Rights Watch, it was reported that individuals in Guatemala cannot self report their gender for official government documents. It must be the gender assigned at birth, and the name assigned at birth. This caused many problems with transgender individuals receiving government services, such as education and access to basic resources, due to the usage of official government ID for these services.

It was reported that there are also active “conversion therapy” centers that were funded by Evangelical churches. These are mainly located in the rural areas of Guatemala. The report discusses what LGBTQ+ individuals were experiencing in the camps, this included electroshock therapy, “corrective” rape, forced marriage, and coerced sex. Regarding corrective rape in courts, it was not recognized as a hate crime, only as rape.

== Politics ==
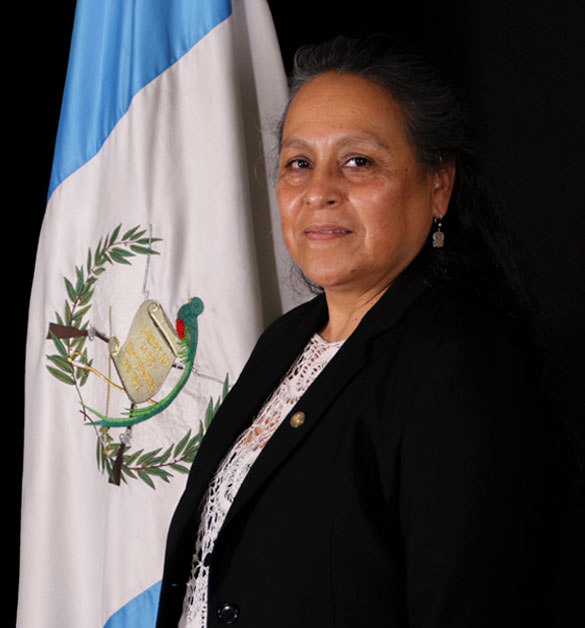
Official portrait of Sandra Morán, one of the first openly lesbian women to be elected to Congress in 2016.

In January 2016, Sandra Morán was elected to Congress, the country's first openly LGBT legislator. She is the country's first openly lesbian lawmaker, and a member of Convergence, a now-defunct left-wing political party.

During the 2019 Guatemalan general election, a total of four openly gay men ran for office. Two openly gay men were among candidates who ran for seats in Congress: Aldo Dávila, executive director of Asociación Gente Positiva, a Guatemala City-based HIV/AIDS service organization, is a member of Winaq, and Otto René Félixa, a member of the far-left Guatemalan National Revolutionary Unity (URNG) party. Two openly gay men ran for seats in the Central American Parliament: José Carlos Hernández Ruano, a member of the Semilla party, and Henry Cortez, a member of Convergence. Following the elections in June, Dávila became the first openly gay man elected to the Congress of Guatemala. He vowed to fight for LGBT rights in the country by pushing for a legislative proposal that would criminalize hate crimes and hate speech against the LGBT community, and a "gender identity law" that would allow transgender people to change their official documents to reflect their gender status. He also seeks to create a national commission of complaints and monitoring for discrimination against women, young people and LGBT people. Hernández Ruano was elected to the Central American Parliament.

== Social conditions ==
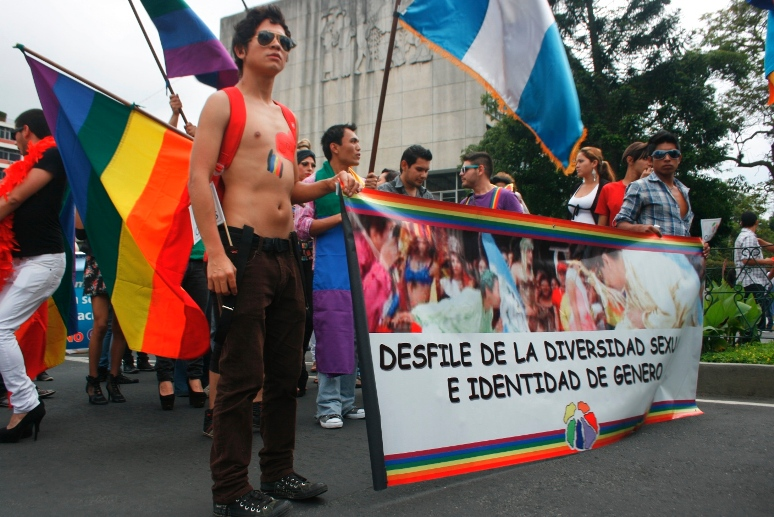
Participants at an LGBT Pride walk in Guatemala City, 23 June 2012

Despite homosexuality being legal since 1871, negative social attitudes have prevailed in Guatemalan society, and harassment, even targeted killings, of LGBT people have been known. For example, while a gay bar was allowed to open in 1976, it was the only gay bar allowed in Guatemala until the late 1990s.

Most Guatemalan residents are members of the Catholic, Fundamentalist Pentecostal, or Eastern Orthodox faiths, which all have traditionally upheld socially conservative attitudes and in particular tend to believe that homosexuality and cross-dressing are signs of immorality. These socially conservative Christian attitudes are also reflected in the dominant political parties in the nation. The National Unity of Hope is a Christian social democratic party, and the Patriotic Party is a conservative, if not right-wing, political party. Most of the other political parties, even the more liberal or left-wing parties, generally ignore the issue of LGBT rights.

Despite these challenges, the LGBT community has become more visible since the 1990s, and the nation's refocus on democratization, peace, and human rights has had some benefit for LGBT rights. In 1993, OASIS (Organization to Support an Integral Sexuality in the Face of AIDS) was allowed to be established as a non-profit group that would provide comprehensive HIV/AIDS education aimed at the LGBT community. The end of the civil war in 1996 and the subsequent advancement of democratization and human rights allowed OASIS to also work on LGBT rights. The first gay pride parade in the country took place in the capital Guatemala City in 2000.

Like many other developing countries, Guatemala's LGBT community face a strong and growing contrast from the rise and grow of fundamendalist pentecostal population in the country.

=== Anti-LGBT violence ===
Bias-motivated crimes (a.k.a. "hate crimes") on the basis of sexual orientation or gender identity are reportedly tolerated by the Government, especially when the harassment or violence is directed at transgender people. The lack of civil rights protections and protections from hate crimes is attributed to the prevailing attitudes about sexual identity and gender roles.

In the late 1990s, there were several reports by the United Nations and some NGOs that LGBT people in Guatemala were being systematically targeted for death as part of a "social cleansing campaign". One of the more prominent victims of this campaign was transgender AIDS activist Luis Palencia, who was gunned down in Guatemala City in 1997.

== Public opinion ==
According to a July 2010 poll by Cid-Gallup, 85% of the country's population opposed same-sex marriage, while 12% supported it and 3% were unsure.

According to a Pew Research Center survey, conducted between 10 November and 16 December 2013, 12% of respondents supported same-sex marriage, 82% were opposed.

An ILGA poll carried out between 18 April and 20 June 2014 showed that 21% of the Guatemalan population supported same-sex marriage.

In May 2015, PlanetRomeo, an LGBT social network, published its first Gay Happiness Index (GHI). Gay men from over 120 countries were asked about how they feel about society's view on homosexuality, how do they experience the way they are treated by other people and how satisfied are they with their lives. Guatemala was ranked 69th with a GHI score of 40.

The 2017 AmericasBarometer showed that 16% of Guatemalans supported same-sex marriage.

== Summary table ==
Same-sex sexual activity legal	Yes (Since 1871)
Equal age of consent	Yes (Since 1871)
Anti-discrimination laws in employment only	No
Anti-discrimination laws in the provision of goods and services	Yes (Since 2024)
Anti-discrimination laws in all other areas (incl. indirect discrimination, hate speech)	No
Anti-discrimination laws in education	No (From 1997 to 2003, repealed afterward)
Same-sex marriages	No
Recognition of same-sex couples	No
Stepchild adoption by same-sex couples	No
Joint adoption by same-sex couples	No
LGBT people allowed to serve openly in the military	No
Right to change legal gender	No / Yes (Since 2016, transgender persons can change their legal name but not their legal gender)
Access to IVF for lesbians	No
Commercial surrogacy for gay male couples	No
MSMs allowed to donate blood	No

== See also ==
- LGBT in Guatemala
- LGBT rights in the Americas
