= Timeline of LGBTQ history in the Dominican Republic =

This is a timeline of notable events in the history of the lesbian, gay, bisexual and transgender (LGBT) community in the Dominican Republic.

== 20th century ==
=== 1943 ===
- Writer Pedro René Contín Aybar publishes the poem Biel, the sailor, considered the first Dominican literary work with homoerotic themes.

=== 1965 ===
- April: Some reports indicate that some openly LGBT people participated in the Dominican Civil War on the side of the rebels..

=== 1983 ===
- The 11 de Mayo Movement is created, the first LGBT group in the country's history.

=== 1985 ===
- The lesbian group Mitilene is established, which originated as a subgroup of the feminist collective Mujer y Salud.
- Mitilene begins printing the lesbian magazine Pezones.

=== 1989 ===
- The organization Amigos Siempre Amigos (ASA) is created, the first officially registered Dominican LGBT organization. Initially, ASA focused on helping people affected by HIV/AIDS.

== 21st century ==
=== 2000 ===
- March 31: For the first time, a public LGBT march was held in the country, when a group of 7 people belonging to ASA walked along El Conde street with a rainbow flag.
- The Ley General de la Juventud 49-2000 (Youth Law) is approved, which includes an article stating: "All young Dominicans, for the purposes of this Law, may not be discriminated against because of their sex and/or sexual orientation".

=== 2001 ===
- February: The GayLesDom collective is created, born as part of the protests against the dismissal from the National Police of two officers accused of homosexuality.
- April: During the country's International Book Fair, a pink booth is set up as a statement against discrimination to LGBT people. Protests from conservative groups led to its closure, although it was later reopened.
- July 1: The GayLesDom collective organizes the first LGBT pride demonstration in the country's history, which gathered on Avenida del Puerto after authorities denied permission to hold it in Plaza de España.

=== 2006 ===
- June: The first edition of Santo Domingo Pride takes place.

=== 2010 ===
- January 26: A new Constitution of the Dominican Republic, approved the previous year by the country's Congress, comes into effect. The constitutional text included content considered discriminatory against same-sex couples and unmarried people in its article 55, which stated in its third section: "The marriage of a man and a woman is the legal foundation of the family. The law governs the right to marriage and its effects".
- June: For the first time, Santo Domingo Pride receives official authorization from the country's authorities.
- December 1-8: The first edition of the Santo Domingo Outfest LGBT Film Festival takes place..

=== 2013 ===
- June 21: US President Barack Obama appoints James Brewster as his country's ambassador to the Dominican Republic. Brewster's openly gay identity provoked strong opposition from conservative religious leaders, including Cardinal Nicolás de Jesús López Rodríguez. Brewster officially started on the position in November of that year, and his arrival made the front page of several local newspapers, which also prominently discussed his husband's arrival.
- November 28: During the opening of the annual Santo Domingo Outfest LGBT Film Festival, the film Franz, the first Dominican gay short film, premieres. The short film starred actor and playwright Reinaldo del Orbe.

=== 2014 ===
- March 6: Television presenter Mia Cepeda becomes the first trans woman to legally change her name to a female one in the country's history, after President Danilo Medina signed a decree authorizing it.
- July 12: Manuel Castro Castillo, head of the National Police, states publicly that openly LGBT people were prohibited from joining the police force.
- December 30: The first same-sex marriage in the Dominican Republic is celebrated at the British Embassy in Santo Domingo. The couple was able to marry because, since the ceremony took place on embassy premises, British marriage equality law applied there. However, the marriage was not recognized by the Dominican government.

=== 2016 ===
- January 5: Catholic and evangelical religious groups issue a public letter naming US Ambassador James Brewster persona non grata due to his homosexuality and his activism in favor of LGBT people in the country.
- June 14: LGBT activists hold two vigils in honor of the victims of the Pulse nightclub massacre in Orlando, among whom were four Dominicans. US Ambassador James Brewster was among those attending the vigils.
- December 14: The Senate of the Dominican Republic approves a reform to the Penal Code that includes sexual orientation as one of the categories protected against discrimination.
- Deivis Ventura and Yimbert Telemin become the first openly LGBT individuals to run for elected office in the history of the Dominican Republic. Ventura ran for Congress and Telemin for City Council.

=== 2019 ===
- August 11: In honor of the fiftieth anniversary of the Stonewall Riots, the 37th edition of the Dominican Day Parade in New York is dedicated to the Dominican LGBT community and a public tribute is paid to activists Deivis Ventura, Samy Nemir Olivares, Génesis Aquino, Chanel López, Elvin García and Chachita Rubio.

=== 2020 ===
- Transgender activist Anlly Rodríguez is appointed alternate councilwoman of Navarrete, making her the first openly LGBT person to hold public office in the country.

=== 2021 ===
- Several local and foreign organizations conduct the first national survey of the Dominican LGBT population.

=== 2024 ===
- September: American baseball player Solomon Bates is hired by the Gigantes del Cibao team, becoming the first openly gay player to play in the Dominican Republic Professional Baseball League.

=== 2025 ===
- November 18: The Constitutional Tribunal of the Dominican Republic issues ruling TC/1225/25, declaring Articles 210 and 260 of the National Police and Armed Forces Justice Codes, respectively, unconstitutional, thereby decriminalizing homosexual relations within the country's military and police forces. These articles criminalized "sodomy" in these institutions with penalties of up to two years of imprisonment.

== See also ==
- LGBTQ rights in the Dominican Republic
