= Aldo Dávila =

Guatemalan politician (born 1977)

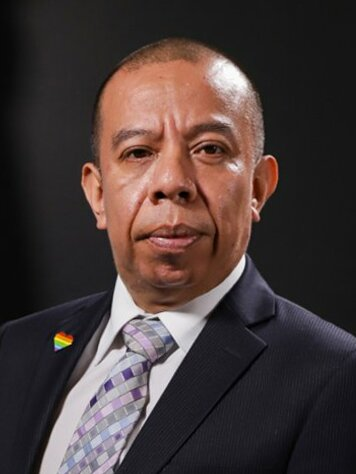
- Official portrait, 2020

Member of the Congress of Guatemala
- In office 14 January 2020 – 14 January 2024
- Constituency: Guatemala City

Personal details
- Born: 20 September 1977 (age 47); Guatemala City, Guatemala
- Political party: VOS (since 2022); Winaq (until 2022)

Aldo Iván Dávila Morales (born 20 September 1977) is a Guatemalan politician who served as deputy of the Congress of Guatemala from 2020 to 2024. Dávila won the 2019 general election as a member of the political party Winaq. He is the first openly gay man and first HIV-positive member elected to Congress.

== Early years ==
Dávila was born in Guatemala City, capital of the Central American country, into a Catholic family. His primary studies were carried out in an evangelical school near the family home in the Saravia neighborhood (zone 5). Being the oldest of 3 brothers, he lost his father at the age of 14, which led him to be the main male breadwinner in his home. During his adolescence, he suffered bullying from his peers and teaching staff due to his sexual orientation.

== Political career ==
Since 2010, he is the president of the LGBT Gente Positiva association. In 2019, he led the candidacy for the Central District to the Congress of Guatemala in the elections of that year as a member of Winaq. He assumed his parliamentary position on January 14, 2020, becoming the only openly LGBT member of the legislature as Sandra Morán, Guatemala's first LGBT representative, did not run for re-election.

In March 2020, Guatemalan President Alejandro Giammattei described Dávila as "gross" after a controversy over the numbers of deaths from COVID-19 during the coronavirus pandemic and the possible variation of numbers due to confusion over deaths from atypical pneumonia .

In June 2023, the presidential candidate Manuel Villacorta presented him as his possible Minister of Labor and Social Security if he won the 2023 general elections.

Dávila applied for re-election to Congress for the 2023 election, but was denied by the Constitutional Court due to two removals of parliamentary immunity during his term. He was retained as an advisor to the VOS bloc in Congress for the 2024-2028 term.
