= LGBTQ people in the Dominican Republic =

LGBTQ people in the Dominican Republic face multiple challenges. Although homosexuality between adults in private is decriminalized, LGBTQ Dominicans still endure discrimination and violence due to their sexual orientation and/or gender identity.

== Stigma and violence ==
In a 2014 poll, almost three quarters, 73%, of people in the Dominican Republic alone have said that members of the LGBTQ community have experienced some sort of violence or discrimination. Members of the LGBT Community in the Dominican Republic are victims of hate crimes, extortion by the police, and discrimination when it comes to resources and employment services. They also face discrimination when seeking treatment from health care systems. Between 2006 and August 2015, there have been 32 reports of possible hate crimes against transgender people.^{:5}

Homosexuality is seen as a disease. Electroshock therapy and conversion therapy are legal in the Dominican Republic.

== Rights ==
Since June 17, 1944, same-sex marriage has been unrecognized by the country. The constitution states that marriage is a union between a man and a woman. In 2010, once the new constitution was written again, it included that same-sex marriage was prohibited.

Homosexuality in the Dominican Republic was decriminalized in 1822. As of 2025, homosexuality remains legal within the Dominican Republic. However, there are no laws that protect LGBTQ people from discrimination in housing and places of employment.

Law 285-66 prohibits LGBT people from serving as members of the police force. Under this law, police officers are also prohibited from engaging in sodomy. In 2014, the law was confirmed that LGBT members were prohibited from joining any police force.

== Trans people ==
Due to employment discrimination against LGBT members, many transgender women resort to sex work. A local NGO counted 17 cases of police violence and discrimination against transgender women sex workers between December 2013 and October 2014.^{:6}

== History ==
In the early 2000s, the Dominican Gay-Lesbian Collective (Colectivo Gay-Lesbianas Dominicanas, GAYLESDOM) organized several LGBTQ events in the country. They staffed a booth at the Book Fair (Feria del Libro) in Santo Domingo, where they distributed information on preventing STIs, including HIV. The National Police briefly closed the booth, but it reopened following protests.

On July 1, 2001, GAYLESDOM held the country's first Gay Pride parade was held in Santo Domingo. During the march, one of the participants, a 20-year-old man, was shot. He died on route to the hospital. In 2016, an estimated 10,000 people attended the Santo Domingo pride parade.

Beginning in 2013, American ambassador to the Dominican Republic Wally Brewster faced backlash for being an openly gay man married to another man. Brewster hosted Dominican LGBTQ rights activists at his residence, and encouraged the embassy to fund LGBTQ rights groups. Local activists credited Brewster with being able to disperse some stigma around LGBTQ identities.

2015 and 2016 saw the country's first openly gay candidates in elections, including Deivis Ventura, who ran for Chamber of Deputies, and Yimbert Telemin, who ran for the La Romana city council. Also in 2016, with the support of the American Embassy and USAID, an LGBT chamber of commerce was established in the country.

== See also ==
- Discrimination against transgender people
