= Hans Hertell =

Puerto Rican diplomat

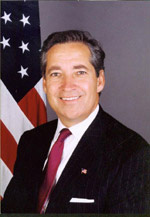

United States Ambassador to the Dominican Republic
- In office November 29, 2001 – May 1, 2007
- President: George W. Bush
- Preceded by: Charles Manatt
- Succeeded by: P. Robert Fannin

Personal details
- Born: San Juan, Puerto Rico
- Party: New Progressive Party
- Other political affiliations: Republican
- Spouse: Marie
- Education: Fordham University (BA); University of Puerto Rico School of Law (JD)
- Profession: Diplomatic corps

Hans Helmut Hertell (born 1950/51, in San Juan, Puerto Rico) is a former United States ambassador to the Dominican Republic. Nominated by President George W. Bush in the summer of 2001, Hertell was sworn in as ambassador on November 8, 2001, and began his duties in the Dominican Republic on November 29, 2001. When he finished his tour on May 1, 2007, Hertell was the second longest serving U.S. ambassador in the world.

== Early years ==
Hertell was a co-founder of Goldman, Antonetti, Ferraiuoli, Axtmayer and Hertell, now the third largest full service law firm in Puerto Rico. From 1992 to 1996, Hertell was managing director for the Caribbean and Latin America affairs at Black, Kelly, Scruggs & Healey, a government and public affairs company based in Washington, D.C. In 1989, he served as a member of the Commission to Review U.S. Magistrates for Reappointment of the U.S. District Court for the District of Puerto Rico. Between 1982 and 1984, he served as political and legal advisor to the Governor of Puerto Rico, as well as to the Attorney General, the Secretary of Agriculture and the Secretary of the Treasury of the Commonwealth of Puerto Rico.

== Ambassador ==
Hertell was sworn in as the United States ambassador to the Dominican Republic on November 8, 2001. At the time the Dominican Republic was the fourth largest trading partner of the United States in the Western Hemisphere after Canada, Brazil and Mexico and the largest economy in Central America and the Caribbean. In April 2007, Hertell officially left his post as ambassador. He was replaced by Chargé d'affaires Roland W. Bullen, who served as the interim head of the embassy until mid-November 2007. On November 15, 2007, P. Robert Fannin was sworn in as the new ambassador.

== Post-ambassador years ==
Hertell remains active in fundraising for the Republican Party. He holds a Bachelor of Arts degree from Fordham University of New York City and a juris doctor from the University of Puerto Rico School of Law. He is also involved with the operations and investments of the Barrick Gold Corporation in the Dominican Republic. He has been the chairman of the board at U.S. Precious Metals, Inc since January 9, 2015. He has been a director of U.S. Precious Metals, Inc since May 31, 2013, and Colt Resources Inc. since April 14, 2015. He also serves as a director of InterEnergy Holdings. In 2009, Hertell lobbied with Dominican authorities for the required permissions and licenses. He joined with Steve Swindal to open a baseball academy in Boca Chica in 2009.

Diplomatic posts
Preceded by Charles Manatt	United States Ambassador to Dominican Republic; 2001–2007	Succeeded by P. Robert Fannin
