= Donna J. Hrinak =

American lawyer and former diplomat (born 1951)

Donna Hrinak
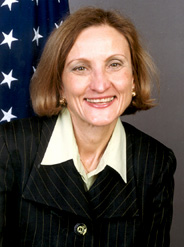
- Hrinak c. 2002

United States Ambassador to Brazil
- In office April 23, 2002 – June 26, 2004
- President: George W. Bush
- Preceded by: Cristobal R. Orozco
- Succeeded by: John J. Danilovich

United States Ambassador to Venezuela
- In office August 25, 2000 – January 23, 2002
- President: Bill Clinton
- Preceded by: John Francis Maisto
- Succeeded by: Charles S. Shapiro

United States Ambassador to Bolivia
- In office January 14, 1998 – July 17, 2000
- President: Bill Clinton
- Preceded by: Curtis Warren Kamman
- Succeeded by: Manuel Rocha

United States Ambassador to the Dominican Republic
- In office July 22, 1994 – December 8, 1997
- President: Bill Clinton
- Preceded by: Robert S. Pastorino
- Succeeded by: Charles Manatt

Personal details
- Born: Donna Jean Hrinak; March 28, 1951 (age 75) Pennsylvania, U.S.
- Children: 1
- Education: Michigan State University (BA); University of Notre Dame (JD)

Donna Jean Hrinak (born March 28, 1951) is an American lawyer and former diplomat who has been the president of Boeing Latin America & Caribbean since September 2011.

== Early life and education ==
Hrinak was born in Sewickley, Pennsylvania on March 28, 1951. She speaks Spanish, Portuguese, and Polish, which served her through her international diplomatic and business postings. Hrinak earned a Bachelor of Arts degree in social sciences from Michigan State University and a Juris Doctor from Notre Dame Law School.

== Career ==
=== Foreign affairs ===
In 1994, Hrinak served as the United States Department of State's coordinator for policy at the First Summit of the Americas.

Later, in 1994, Hrinak was nominated by Bill Clinton to be the United States Ambassador to the Dominican Republic. In 1997, she was appointed ambassador to Bolivia. From 2000 to 2002, she was ambassador to Venezuela.

Hrinak served as Ambassador to Brazil from 2002 to 2004 under the presidency of George W. Bush.

=== Business and law ===
In 2004, Hrinak became a senior counselor for international trade and government affairs at Steel Hector & Davis, an international law firm in Miami, Florida.

Hrinak became a corporate affairs director for the Latin American and European Union sectors of Kraft Foods. In 2008, Hrinak joined PepsiCo as global public policy and government affairs vice president.

In 2011, Hrinak was appointed as president of Boeing Brazil. In 2019, Hrinak became the president of Boeing Latin America and Canada.

== Awards and recognition ==
The Miami chapter of the Organization of Women in International Trade named Hrinak the 2005 International Businesswoman of the Year. Her other honors include the U.S. State Department's Career Achievement Award and the U.S. Coast Guard's Distinguished Public Service Award. Hrinak is currently a member of the board of directors of the Council on Foreign Relations and the board of counselors of McLarty Associates. She is also a member of Washington D.C.–based think tank the Inter-American Dialogue.

== Personal life ==
Hrinak has a son, Wyatt.

Diplomatic posts
Preceded by Robert Stephen Pastorino	United States Ambassador to the Dominican Republic; 1994–1997	Succeeded by Charles Taylor Manatt
Preceded by Curtis Warren Kamman	United States Ambassador to Bolivia; 1997–2000	Succeeded by V. Manuel Rocha
Preceded by John Maisto	United States Ambassador to Venezuela; 2000–2002	Succeeded by Charles S. Shapiro
Preceded by Cristobal R. Orozco	United States Ambassador to Brazil; 2002–2004	Succeeded by John J. Danilovich
