= LGBTQ rights in the Dominican Republic =

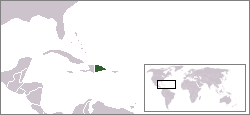
- Map showing the Dominican Republic
- Legal status: Homosexuality legal since 1822
- Discrimination protections: (see below)

Family rights
- Restrictions: Same-sex marriage constitutionally banned

LGBTQ people in the Dominican Republic do not possess the same legal protections as non-LGBTQ residents, and face social challenges that are not experienced by other people. While the Dominican Criminal Code does not prohibit same-sex sexual relations nor transgender people, it also does not address discrimination or harassment on the account of sexual orientation or gender identity, nor does the law recognize same-sex unions in any form, whether it be marriage or partnerships. Households headed by same-sex couples are also not eligible for any of the same rights given to opposite-sex married couples, as same-sex marriage is constitutionally banned in the country.

A majority of Dominicans are affiliated with the Catholic Church. As such, attitudes towards members of the LGBTQ community tend to reflect prevailing Catholic morals. Support for same-sex marriage was 25% according to a 2013/2014 opinion poll.

== Legality of same-sex sexual activity ==
Homosexuality laws in Central America and the Caribbean Islands. Same-sex marriage Other type of partnership Unregistered cohabitation No recognition of same-sex couples Constitution limits marriage to opposite-sex couples Same-sex sexual activity illegal but law not enforced

Consensual same-sex sexual acts between adults in private have been legal in the Dominican Republic since 1822 and the age of consent is set equally at 18 years of age. Previously, the Penal Code criminalised any act that was deemed to be in violation of "decorum and good behaviour" in public, and imposed fines and up to two years imprisonment. This law was sometimes used by police officers to harass, fine or jail same-sex couples who engage in public displays of affection. This was repealed in 1997 through an amendment to the Criminal Code.

== Recognition of same-sex relationships ==
The family law statutes of the Dominican Republic do not recognize any legal status between persons of the same-sex, neither marriage nor any marriage-like relationship like civil partnerships or domestic partnerships. The Constitution was amended in 2010 to read in Article 55 that: "The State shall promote and protect the family organization based on the institution of marriage between a man and a woman", as part of a series of changes that banned abortion, stripped native-born children of illegal immigrants of their citizenship, and authorized the private ownership of beaches.

However, there are also laws that could be used to justify recognition of such relationships. Article 41, 'Validity of Marriage', of law 544-14, 'Derecho Internacional Privado de La República Dominicana', states that "Marriage is valid ... if it is considered as such by the law of the place of celebration, or by the national law, or of the domicile of at least one of the spouses at the time of the celebration."

=== 2018 Inter-American Court of Human Rights advisory opinion ===
On 9 January 2018, the Inter-American Court of Human Rights (IACHR) issued an advisory opinion that parties to the American Convention on Human Rights should grant same-sex couples "accession to all existing domestic legal systems of family registration, including marriage, along with all rights that derive from marriage".

Several Dominican legal experts have since announced that the Dominican Republic must legalise same-sex marriage and implement the IACHR advisory opinion in due course.

== Discrimination protections ==
In the Dominican Republic, few legal instruments in some specific areas protect LGBTQ people from discrimination. Since 2000, the General Law on Youth (Law 49/2000) (Spanish: Ley General de Juventud No. 49-2000) has prohibited discrimination on the basis of sexual orientation. Article 11 of the Code of Criminal Procedure, in effect since 2007, establishes that judges and prosecutors must take into account the particular circumstances of each person involved in each case but cannot base their decisions solely based on their sexual orientation. Since 2011, the Law 135/2011 on HIV/AIDS (Spanish: Ley de VIH/SIDA No. 135-11) has prohibited discrimination on the basis of sexual orientation and gender identity.

Discrimination on account of sexual orientation or gender identity is not illegal in areas such as employment, education, housing, health care, banking, transportation, government services and public accommodations. As a result, many LGBTQ people feel the need to remain in the closet and reports of anti-gay discrimination are quite common.

In 2025, the Constitutional Court found that the Dominican Republic constitution bans discrimination based on a sexual orientation, in a ruling that struck down laws criminalizing sodomy in the police and armed forces. The ruling found this included the constitution's prohibition against employment discrimination.

=== Hate crimes ===
LGBTQ people in the Dominican Republic have sometimes been the targets of violence. From 2006 to 2009, official sources reported the murder of at least 14 transgender sex workers; the Dominican Trans and Transvestite Sex Workers Community, co-founded by Nairovi Castillo, was established in 2004 to advocate for transgender sex workers. Bias-motivated crimes have also been reported against LGBTQ people from the middle and upper classes, including TV producer Micky Breton and Claudio Nasco. Other prominent people who have the targets of such violence include film director Jean Luis Jorge, journalist Víctor Gulías, Dr. Jesús Díaz Almánzar, and William Cordero. In 2014, Van Teasley, a visiting American lawyer and gay activist, was found murdered in his Santo Domingo apartment.

A new Penal Code that included provisions banning hate crimes on the basis of sexual orientation was expected to take effect in December 2015, but it was deemed unconstitutional shortly before taking effect by the Constitutional Court because its sections regarding abortion were "plagued with irregularities and violations". In 2016, the Senate and the Chamber of Deputies approved modifications to the initial version by fully criminalising abortion. Sexual orientation-based hate crimes would have remained banned under this version. However, President Danilo Medina vetoed it in December 2016, asking deputies to legalise abortion in cases of rape, incest and saving the mother's life. A new draft bill was introduced in August 2017 by two deputies, leaving out all parts in regards to abortion. The two deputies stated that abortion should be regulated in a separate law, and complained that this issue had delayed the enactment of other important measures.

If finally approved, the Penal Code would provide penalties of between 30 and 60 years imprisonment for hate crimes. In addition, those who cause torture, cruel, inhuman and degrading treatment to anyone because of their sexual orientation could be sentenced to 30 to 40 years in prison.

=== Access to health care services ===
Citizens of the Dominican Republic have a constitutional right to access health care services. Health care programs for the LGBTQ community in the Dominican Republic have generally focused on HIV/AIDS education, which are often run by non-governmental organizations.

== Gender identity and expression ==
Transgender people in the Dominican Republic are not allowed to change their legal gender and name to reflect their gender identity.

In June 2018, President Danilo Medina issued an executive decree granting 35 transgender Dominicans the possibility to change their legal name so that it matches their gender identity. Television journalist Mía Cepeda was one of the 35 individuals and subsequently managed to change her name to reflect her transgender status.

== Military service ==
In 2025, the Constitutional Court struck down provisions of the 1966 Police Justice Code and the Armed Forces Justice Code which prohibited same-sex sexual activity among servicemembers, with penalties up to six months. The court found these laws violated the constitutional prohibition against sexual orientation discrimination.

== Living conditions ==
The socially conservative mores of the Catholic Church and evangelical Protestant denominations hold significant sway in both public policy and prevailing attitudes surrounding LGBTQ rights. Recent reports suggest that signs of a visible, politically active LGBTQ community are often targets of a government crackdown, often with the support of religious leaders.

In the summer of 2006, several gay clubs and bars in Santo Domingo were shut down as part of a program of police harassment.

In 2012, members of the police department crashed the LGBT Pride Parade in Santo Domingo and arrested individuals at the parade on the ground that marchers were improperly using the Dominican Republic's flag.

Due to the majority of residents having conservative views, including opposition to homosexuality, the major political parties in the Dominican Republic have not expressed much public support for LGBTQ rights legislation.

Former U.S. Ambassador Wally Brewster (2013–2017) was openly gay and active in supporting LGBTQ events in the Dominican Republic, regularly meeting LGBTQ rights groups and publicly appearing in the Dominican media and schools with his husband. Brewster was often the target of insults from religious leaders and some politicians due to his sexual orientation. Evangelical groups started an unsuccessful petition asking the Government to expel him from the country, and called on Brewster to "go home and cook since he's married to a man."

During an April 2017 LGBTQ conference held in Santo Domingo, Minister of Women's Affairs Janet Camilo, speaking on behalf of the Dominican Government, said that "everyone should be equal under the law and in society" and that the Government was "doing everything possible to build and fight for equality, for an inclusive society for everyone." The conference was attended by LGBTQ activists from across Latin America, including Rosmit Mantilla, member of the Venezuelan opposition Popular Will party.

=== Non-governmental organizations ===
Amigos Siempre Amigos (ASA; "Friends Always Friends") is a non-governmental organization (NGO) in the Dominican Republic that addresses health concerns among the LGBTQ community.

Trans Siempre Amigas (TRANSSA, "Trans Always Friends") is another Dominican Republic-based organization that promotes respect, fairness, and tolerance of the transgender community.

Diversidad Dominicana is an activist organization that supports LGBTQ rights.

== Public opinion ==
According to a Pew Research Center survey conducted between 2 November 2013 and 2 February 2014, 25% of respondents supported same-sex marriage and 72% opposed it.

According to a 2017 poll carried out by ILGA, 22% of Dominicans agreed that gay, lesbian and bisexual people should enjoy the same rights as straight people, while 64% disagreed. Additionally, 20% agreed that they should be protected from workplace discrimination. 69% of Dominicans, however, said that people who are in same-sex relationships should be charged as criminals, while 31% disagreed. As for transgender people, 17% agreed that they should have the same rights, 15% believed they should be protected from employment discrimination and a plurality of 5% believed they should be allowed to change their legal gender.

The 2017 AmericasBarometer showed that 17% of Dominicans supported same-sex marriage.

A February 2018 poll by CDN 37 showed that 45% of respondents supported same-sex marriage while 55% opposed it.

A May 2023 poll of Dominicans by ACD Media showed 17.6% supported same-sex marriage, 75.1% said it shouldn't be allowed, and 7.3% either didn't know or didn't care.

== Summary table ==
Same-sex sexual activity legal	Yes (Since 1822)
Equal age of consent (18)	Yes (Since 1822)
Anti-discrimination laws in employment	Yes (Since 2025)
Anti-discrimination laws in the provision of goods and services	No
Anti-discrimination laws in all other areas	No
Hate crimes laws include sexual orientation	No
Recognition of same-sex couples	No
Same-sex marriage	No (Constitutional ban since 2010)
Stepchild adoption by same-sex couples	No
Joint adoption by same-sex couples	No
LGBTQ people allowed to serve in the military	Yes (Since 2025)
Right to change legal gender	No
Access to IVF for lesbians	No
Commercial surrogacy for gay male couples	No
MSMs allowed to donate blood	Yes (No specific restrictions)

== See also ==
- Timeline of LGBTQ history in the Dominican Republic
- LGBT rights in the Americas
- Güevedoce
