= Kilday =

Kilday is a surname. Notable people with the surname include:

- Andrea Kilday (born 1982), New Zealand Taekwondo fighter
- Lee Kilday (born 1992), Scottish footballer
- Lowell C. Kilday (1931-2011), American diplomat
- Paul J. Kilday (1900-1968), U.S. Representative for Texas
