= Raul Yzaguirre =

American civil rights activist

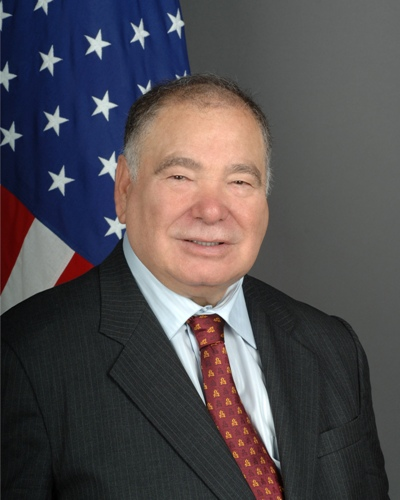

United States Ambassador to the Dominican Republic
- In office November 17, 2010 – May 29, 2013
- President: Barack Obama
- Preceded by: Christopher Lambert (Chargé d'Affaires ad interim)
- Succeeded by: James "Wally" Brewster Jr.

Personal details
- Born: Raul Humberto Yzaguirre; July 22, 1939 (age 87) San Juan, Texas, U.S.
- Party: Democratic
- Spouse: Audrey Yzaguirre
- Education: George Washington University
- Profession: Activist
- Awards: Presidential Medal of Freedom (2022)

Military service
- Allegiance: United States
- Branch/service: United States Air Force
- Years of service: 1958–1962
- Unit: United States Air Force Medical Service (AFMS)

Raul Humberto Yzaguirre (born July 22, 1939) is an American civil rights activist. He is a life member of the Council on Foreign Relations. He served as the president and CEO of the National Council of La Raza from 1974 to 2004 and as U.S. Ambassador to the Dominican Republic from November 2010 to May 2013.

== Early life ==
Yzaguirre was born to Mexican-American parents Rubén Antonio and Eva Linda (Morin) Yzaguirre and grew up in the Rio Grande Valley of South Texas. Yzaguirre states that some of his first memories of social injustice involved what his grandmother called a "race war" in Texas. Mexican Americans lived under a curfew at that time and Yzaguirre's grandfather was almost lynched one night when coming home after dark from his second job.

In 1958, he enlisted in the U.S. Air Force Medical Service and served for four years. He has a B.S. from George Washington University.

== National Council of La Raza ==
In 1968, the Southwest Council of La Raza was organized with funding from the Ford Foundation. By 1972, the organization had changed its name to the National Council for La Raza and moved its offices to Washington, D.C. In 1997, the Ford Foundation, the NCLR's sole funding source, demanded a change in the organization's focus and direction by threatening to withhold funding and forced its president, Henry Santiestevan, out of office.

In 1974, Yzaguirre was elected the second president of the NCLR. The Ford Foundation was pleased with Yzaguirre and continued to be a top donor of the NCLR throughout his term.

Under Yzaguirre, the organization grew from a regional advocacy group with 17 affiliates to over 300 that serve 41 states, Puerto Rico, and the District of Columbia. Yzaguirre expanded membership criteria so it was not limited only to ethnic Mexicans, but also included Puerto Ricans, Dominicans, Argentines, Cubans, Venezuelans and all other Hispanic subgroups. This paved the way for the National Council for La Raza to open offices in Chicago, Los Angeles, Phoenix, Sacramento, San Antonio, and San Juan. Since then NCLR has added offices in New York and Atlanta.

Through his tenure Yzaguirre built the NCLR into a 35,000 members organization, with revenues exceeding $3 million, from a combination of contributions from American corporations, philanthropic foundations, federal funding, and private member donations.

He was fired as chair of the Hispanic Advisory Commission to the Immigration and Naturalization Service for publicly criticizing President Carter's immigration reform proposals. Yzaguirre also criticized President George H. W. Bush for his affirmative action stance even after he had agreed to be the first sitting president to appear at an NCLR Annual Conference. Yzaguirre criticized President Clinton for appointing very few Hispanics to key positions and for the 1996 welfare reform law which NCLR considered detrimental to the Hispanic community and resigned as chair of the President's Advisory Commission on Educational Excellence for Hispanic Americans in protest of political machinations.

On November 30, 2009, President Barack Obama nominated Yzaguirre to be U.S. Ambassador to the Dominican Republic. His appointment was confirmed by the U.S. Senate on September 29, 2010. He resigned his service in that post on May 29, 2013, and now resides in Mount Airy, Maryland.

== Council on Foreign Relations ==
Yzaguirre is a lifetime member and serves on the Member Selection Committee of the David Rockefeller-headed Council on Foreign Relations. and was a member of the Independent Task Force on North America.

== Position at Arizona State University ==
As part of Michael Crow's commitment to a "New American University" at Arizona State University, he appointed Yzaguirre to the position of presidential professor of practice in community development and civil rights at ASU.

== Awards and honors ==
- Fellow at the Harvard Institute of Politics, John F. Kennedy School of Government, one of the first Hispanic Fellows (1989)
- Hubert H. Humphrey Civil Rights Award, Leadership Conference on Civil Rights (1993)
- Order of the Aztec Eagle, the highest honor awarded by the Mexican government to citizens of another nation (1993)
- Namesake for the Raul Yzaguirre Schools for Success in Houston (1996)
- John W. Gardner Leadership Award, Independent Sector (2004)
- Smithsonian Latino Center Legacy Award (2007)
- The George Washington University Distinguished Alumni Achievement Award (2012)
- Duarte, Sanchez y Mella Medal of Merit, Dominican Republic Government (2013)
- Presidential Medal of Freedom (2022)

== Select publications ==
- Op-eds
1. "What’s Wrong with the Immigration Bill?" op-ed, Washington Post, November 24, 1983.
2. "Parting Shots on NAFTA," op-ed, Los Angeles Times, November 16, 1993.
3. "California Cleansing," op-ed, Washington Post, May 18, 1994.
- Journal Articles
1. "Ancianos Management Training," in Aging in America’s Neighborhoods, United States Department of Health, Education, and Welfare, 1975.
2. "The Little Feet Took Giant Steps," Hispanic, 1988.
3. "Hispanic Human Rights Goals for the 1990s," Journal of Intergroup Relations, Winter 1994.
4. "Accurate Racial/Ethnic Data Should Drive Hispanic Category Review," Poverty & Race, January–February 1995.
5. "The Fair Housing Act: A Latino Perspective," Cityscape: A Journal of Policy Development and Research, 1999.
- Book Chapters
1. "Understanding Bilingual Education," in A. Gartner, Beyond Reagan: Alternatives for the 1980s, 1984.
2. "The New American Identity," in F. Hesselbein, The Drucker Foundation: Community of the Future, 1998.
3. "The Two Faces of American Immigration" (May 31, 1994), in J. Gottheimer, Ripples of Hope: Great American Civil Rights Speeches, 2009.
4. "Media: Shaping the Images," in R. Montemayor, Latinos: Right before Our Eyes, 2004.
5. "Foreword," in T. Atencio et al., Resolana: Emerging Chicano Dialogues on Community and Globalization, 2009.
6. "Liberty and Justice for All," in H. Cisneros, Latinos and the Nation’s Future, 2009

Diplomatic posts
Preceded by Christopher Lambert as (Chargé d'Affaires ad interim)	United States Ambassador to the Dominican Republic; 2010–2013	Succeeded by James "Wally" Brewster Jr.
