= San Francisco Polytechnic High School =

Former school in California, United States

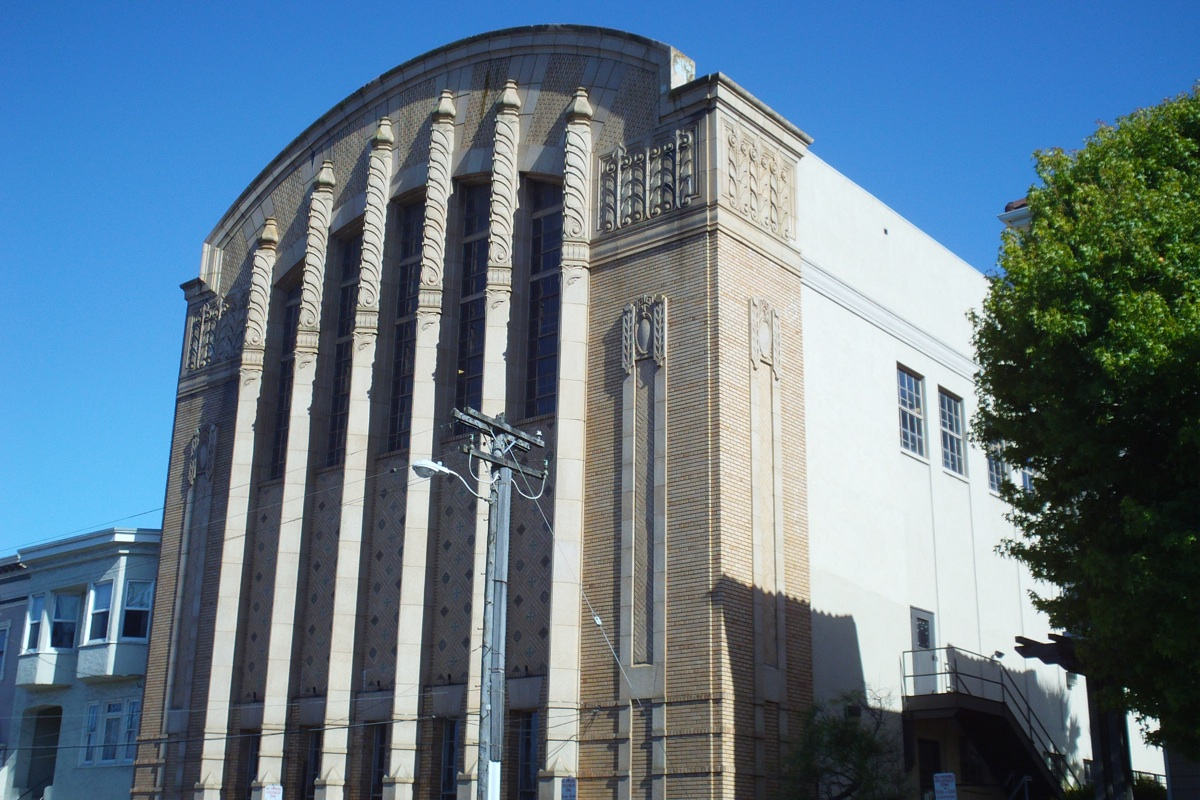
- Former girls' gymnasium of San Francisco Polytechnic

Location
- 701 Frederick Street; San Francisco, California; United States; 37°45′56″N 122°27′22″W

Information
- Type: Public secondary
- Established: 1884
- Closed: 1973
- School district: San Francisco Unified School District
- Grades: 9–12
- Campus type: Urban
- Colors: Red and black
- Mascot: Parrot

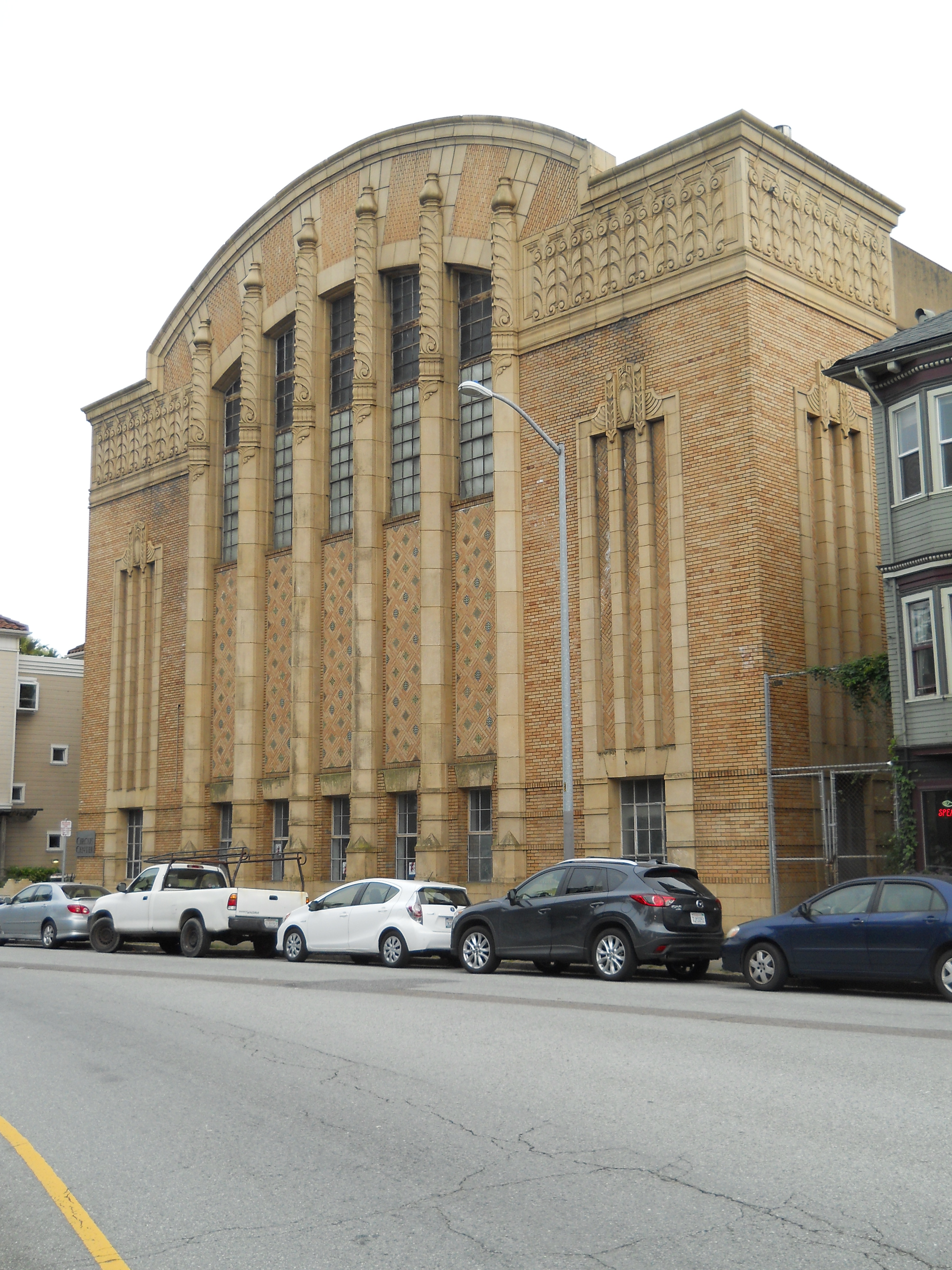
Former boys' gymnasium

San Francisco Polytechnic High School was a public secondary school in San Francisco, California. Located from 1912 at 701 Frederick Street, across from Kezar Stadium, the school was in operation from 1884 until 1973.

== History ==
The school opened in 1884 as the Commercial School, on Powell Street between Clay and Sacramento. It subsequently moved to Bush and Stockton Streets. Academic subjects were added to the curriculum in 1890 and art and shop in 1895, when it was renamed San Francisco Polytechnic High School. The building was destroyed in the 1906 earthquake, and replaced in 1911 by a classical revival building on Frederick Street, which opened in 1915; a "manual and shop training" building facing Carl Street opened in 1912. Later additions included boys' and girls' gymnasiums in art deco style, at opposite ends of the school. During this period the school had 2,000 students, more than any other in the city. The school offered a college preparatory curriculum, as well as training in automobile repair, drafting, printing, and electronics through the Miranda Lux Laboratory.

Since 1928, the school has been holding the NorCal record of attendance for a high school football game (Poly vs Lowell High School, 50,000 spectators).

In the 1960s an influx of black families led to an option system under which many white parents elected to send their children instead to Lowell High School, San Francisco Polytechnic's traditional rival; by the late 1960s San Francisco Polytechnic was more than 50% African American and Filipino. The first black principal, Nathaniel Brooks, was appointed in spring 1968 and the numbers of black teachers and Black studies courses were increased after student protests about a letter to the Superintendent of Education from teachers complaining about the students. However, in 1972 the decision was made to close the school because of a continuing decline in enrollment and because all the buildings, except the girls' gym, were found not to meet the requirements of the Field Act for seismic soundness. In 1973 the school closed and students were transferred to the new McAteer High School. The school was the temporary home of Mission High School from 1973 to 1977.

Squatters occupied the buildings in the 1980s; in 1989 all except the two gyms were demolished and replaced by the Parkview Commons condominium development. The cornerstone was stolen during demolition. As of January 2018 the boys' gym houses the San Francisco Circus Center and the girls', AcroSports. In October 2022 the street name "Polytechnic Way" was given to the 700 block of Frederick Street by the San Francisco Board of Supervisors.

== Extracurricular activities ==
The San Francisco Polytechnic football team won numerous trophies from the 1920s to the 1950s. More than 50,000 people were at Kezar Stadium for the 1928 city championship game with the school's traditional rival Lowell High School, the highest attendance for a high school football game in northern California. In November 2020, the Polytechnic Alumni Association offered a reward of up to $5,000 for the return of approximately 50 sports trophies that went missing after the school closed.

== Notable alumni ==
- Luis Walter Alvarez, recipient of the Nobel Prize in Physics
- Warner Baxter, Best Actor Academy Award winner, 1928
- Tad Dorgan, cartoonist
- Paul Desmond, musician
- George Fenneman, announcer
- Janet Gaynor, actress and painter
- Edward Ginzton, physicist
- Rube Goldberg, cartoonist
- Barry Shabaka Henley, actor
- Louis Macouillard, artist
- Alice Marble, International Tennis Hall of Fame
- Vonetta McGee, actress
- Kathy Raymond, model
- Robert S. Pastorino, diplomat
- Merl Saunders, musician
- Rudy Rintala (1909-1999), four-sport star athlete at Stanford University during the 1930s
- George Seifert, former NFL coach
- Bob St. Clair, former San Francisco 49ers player and Pro Football Hall of Fame inductee
- Martha Wash, singer
- Caspar Weinberger, former Secretary of Defense
- Victor Willis, Village People lead singer

== See also ==
- List of closed secondary schools in California
