= Paul D. Taylor =

American diplomat (1939–2021)

Paul Taylor

United States Ambassador to the Dominican Republic
- In office August 18, 1988 – January 9, 1992
- President: Ronald Reagan; George H. W. Bush
- Preceded by: Lowell C. Kilday
- Succeeded by: Robert S. Pastorino

Personal details
- Born: Paul Daniel Taylor; May 16, 1939; Warrens Corners, New York, U.S.
- Died: July 18, 2021 (aged 82); Hingham, Massachusetts, U.S.
- Children: 3
- Education: Princeton University (BA); Harvard University (MPA)

Paul Daniel Taylor (May 16, 1939 – July 18, 2021) was an American diplomat and academic who served as the United States ambassador to the Dominican Republic from 1988 to 1992.

== Early life and education ==
Taylor was born in the hamlet of Warrens Corners, New York. He earned a Bachelor of Arts degree from Princeton University in 1960 and a Master of Public Administration from Harvard University in 1967.

== Career ==
Taylor joined the United States Foreign Service in 1960 and served in diplomatic assignments for two or three years each in Quito, Ecuador, Bangkok, Thailand, São Paulo, Brazil, and Madrid, Spain. From 1981 to 1984, he was deputy chief of mission in Guatemala and Chargé d'Affaires in 1984. From 1985 to 1988, he served as Deputy Assistant Secretary of State for Inter-American Affairs. On April 11, 1988, President Ronald Reagan nominated him to be the United States Ambassador to the Dominican Republic. He was appointed to this post on July 11, 1988, presented his credentials on 18 August 1988, and left that post on January 9, 1992. His final posting in the Foreign Service was as State Department advisor to the president of the Naval War College in Newport, Rhode Island from 1992 to 1994.

After retiring from the Foreign Service, Taylor returned to the Naval War College faculty as a researcher. While serving in this role, he edited volumes on maritime strategy that were translated into Spanish and Portuguese, becoming the college's first publication in a foreign language. Following his retirement from full-time work, he continued to teach elective courses at the Naval War College on Latin America, the Caribbean region, and international economics.

== Personal life ==
Taylor was married and had three children. He lived in Newport, Rhode Island for 23 years, before moving to Hingham, Massachusetts in 2017, where he died at Linden Ponds Senior Living in July 2021.

== Publications ==
- Perspectivas sobre estratégia marítima : ensaios das Américas, a nova estratégia marítima dos EUA e comentário sobre uma estratégia cooperativa para o poder marítima no século XXI Paul D. Taylor, organizador. (Naval War College Press, 2009)
- Perspectivas sobre estrategia marítima: ensayos de las Américas, la nueva estrategia marítima de EE.UU. y comentario sobre Una estrategia cooperativa para el poder naval en el siglo XXI. (Naval War College Press, 2009).
- Perspectives on Maritime Strategy: Essays from the Americas. Paul D. Taylor, editor. (Naval War College Press, 2008).
- Latin American security challenges: a collaborative inquiry from North and South. edited by Paul D. Taylor. (Naval War College, 2004)
- Latin American futures project : summary results with a policy annex by the Naval War College (Naval War College, 2003).
- Missile defense project: International Simulation, 7–8 December 2001. (Naval War College, 2001).
- Asia & the Pacific: U.S. strategic traditions and regional realities, edited by Paul D. Taylor. (Naval War College Press, 2001)

Diplomatic posts
Preceded by Lowell C. Kilday	United States Ambassador to the Dominican Republic; 1988–1992	Succeeded by Robert S. Pastorino
