= Robin Bernstein (diplomat) =

American businesswoman and diplomat (born 1953)

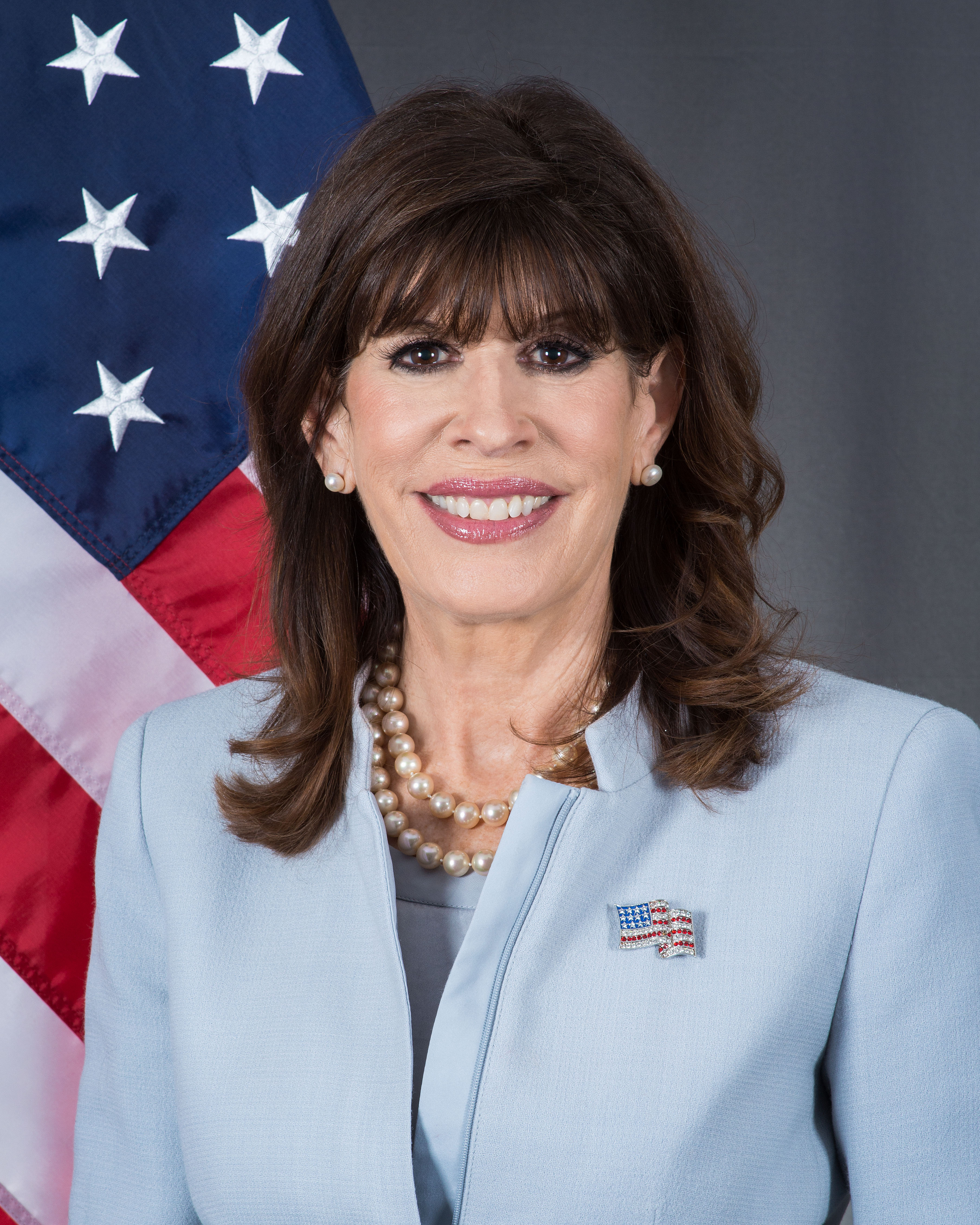

United States Ambassador to the Dominican Republic
- In office September 3, 2018 – January 20, 2021
- President: Donald Trump
- Preceded by: Wally Brewster
- Succeeded by: Robert W. Thomas (Chargé d'affaires ad interim)

Personal details
- Born: 1953 (age 72–73) Bridgeton, New Jersey, U.S.
- Party: Democratic Party (before 1986); Republican Party (1986–present)
- Education: American University School of International Service (BA); George Washington University (MBA)

Robin Stein Bernstein (born 1953) is a Florida businesswoman who served as the United States Ambassador to the Dominican Republic from 2018 to 2021.

== Education ==
Bernstein was born in Bridgeton, New Jersey and graduated from Bridgeton High School in 1972. She received a Bachelor of Arts in Language Area Studies from the American University School of International Service in 1975. She later earned a Master of Business Administration from the George Washington University School of Business in 1981.

== Career ==
She started off as a Democrat and served as a transition team member for Jimmy Carter and then worked around the Democratic Party until 1986, when she became a Republican. She was a founding member of Trump's Mar-a-Lago Club, and has been his insurance agent for many years, leading to concerns about potential conflicts of interest, especially given the Trump Organization's pursuit of a licensing deal in the Dominican Republic.

Diplomatic posts
Preceded by Wally Brewster	United States Ambassador to Dominican Republic; 2018–2021	Succeeded by Robert W. Thomas; Chargé d'affaires ad interim
