= Will, Opportunity and Solidarity =

Political party in Guatemala

Will, Opportunity and Solidarity Voluntad, Oportunidad y Solidaridad
- Abbreviation: VOS
- Leader: Orlando Blanco
- Secretary-General: Carlos Bezares
- Founded: 2020
- Legalised: 7 December 2022
- Split from: UNE, Winaq
- Ideology: Social democracy
- Political position: Centre-left (Note: VOS was described as both "left-wing" and "centre-right")
- Colors: Magenta
- Seats in Congress: 4 / 160

Will, Opportunity and Solidarity (Spanish: Voluntad, Oportunidad y Solidaridad) is a political party in Guatemala.

== History ==
The political party was registered with the Supreme Electoral Tribunal in 2020. Immigrant rights activist Marcos Antil is one of the party's founders. Secretary General Carlos Bezares was previously candidate for URNG, Movimiento Nueva República and Libre.

The National Unity of Hope had an internal division between deputies opponents and supporters of Sandra Torres in 2020, caused by Torres's accusations of corruption and poor electoral results in 2019, as well as her support for the government of Alejandro Giammattei. A faction opposing Torres removed her as leader and expelled her from the party in 2021. However, the Supreme Electoral Tribunal ruled in favor of Torres and allowed her to continue as party leader.

A few days after the decision of the electoral court, the opposition group to Sandra Torres announced its resignation from the National Unity of Hope, to found the "Parliamentary Opposition Group", in reference to its parliamentary opposition to the Giammattei government.

The Parliamentary Opposition Group and deputy Aldo Dávila approached the Will, Opportunity and Solidarity political party. On 7 December 2022, the party was registered with the electoral body.

On 22 December 2022, former presidential candidate Manuel Villacorta joined the party.

== Electoral history ==
=== Presidential elections ===
Election	Candidates		First round		Second round		Status
Election	President	Vice President	Votes	%	Votes	%	Status
2023	Manuel Villacorta	Jorge Mario García	238,686	5.68	—	—	Lost ✗

=== Legislative elections ===
Election	Votes	%	Seats	+/–	Status
2023	186,438	4.47 (#7)	4 / 160	New	External support (2024)
2023	186,438	4.47 (#7)	4 / 160	New	Opposition (2024–present)
