= Charles Manatt =

American diplomat

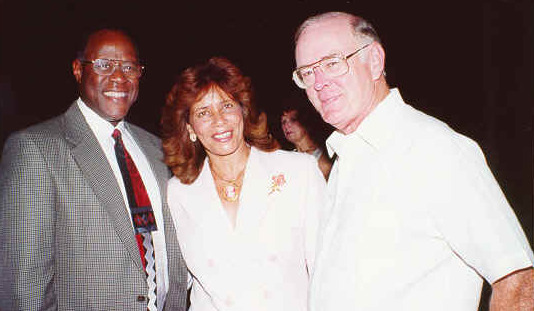
- Manatt (right) in 2000

United States Ambassador to the Dominican Republic
- In office December 17, 1999 – March 1, 2001
- President: Bill Clinton; George W. Bush
- Preceded by: Donna Hrinak
- Succeeded by: Hans H. Hertell

Chair of the Democratic National Committee
- In office February 27, 1981 – February 1, 1985
- Preceded by: John White
- Succeeded by: Paul G. Kirk

Personal details
- Born: June 9, 1936 Chicago, Illinois, U.S.
- Died: July 22, 2011 (aged 75) Richmond, Virginia, U.S.
- Party: Democratic
- Spouse: Kathy Klinkefus (1957–2011)
- Children: 3
- Education: Iowa State University (BA); George Washington University (JD)

Charles Taylor Manatt (June 9, 1936 – July 22, 2011) was a U.S. Democratic Party political figure. He was an American lawyer, politician and businessman.

Manatt was chairman of the Democratic National Committee from 1981 to 1985. In those years, he supervised and directed the 1984 Democratic National Convention. He was a delegate, sometimes categorized as a super delegate. He was the founder of the law firm Manatt, Phelps, and Phillips LLP, where his practice focused on international, administrative, and corporate law. He also served as ambassador to the Dominican Republic from 1999 to 2001. Manatt served until June 2008 as chairman of the board of trustees at George Washington University. His widow is Kathleen K. Manatt.

Manatt was a former chair of the board of directors of the International Foundation of Election Systems. He and his wife Kathleen established the Manatt Democracy Studies Fellowship Program in 1998.

Manatt died on July 22, 2011, at the age of 75.

== Early life ==
=== Family ===
Manatt was born on June 9, 1936, in Chicago, Illinois. Son of William Price Manatt, and Lucille Taylor Manatt, the younger of two boys alongside Richard P. Manatt. Although born in Chicago, he grew up in Audubon, Iowa, helping his father, a farmer, care for the family farm. His mother was a school teacher and later a homemaker. He attended elementary, middle and high school in Audubon. In his sophomore year, he began dating Kathy Klinkefus, who later became his wife.

=== Education ===
In 1954, Manatt began studying at Iowa State College (later University) and was a member of the Delta Chi fraternity. He and Kathy Klinkefus, who also attended Iowa State, graduated in early 1958. Shortly thereafter, they moved to Washington D.C., and he began studying at the George Washington University Law School, graduating in 1962.

== Foundation of the law firm ==
In 1965, while living in Los Angeles, Manatt founded the Manatt law firm with his long-time friend and colleague Thomas Phelps, a banking and finance attorney. He began his legal career focusing on banking and financial services. In 1976, Mickey Kantor joined the firm and his name was added to the letterhead, until his departure in 1993. L. Lee Phillips, an entertainment lawyer, joined the firm in 1977, and became a named partner soon after. For its founding location, the firm headquarters are in Los Angeles. Over time, offices were opened in 8 different cities, primarily in California but also in New York and Washington D.C.

In 2007, the law firm was employing 380 attorneys. It was founded as a general practice and now incorporates litigation, corporate finance, entertainment, health care, real estate, advertising, and lobbying. Some of their notable clients are: in advertising, Coca Cola Company, and Yahoo!; In entertainment, Sony Pictures Entertainment, and The Eagles, and in consumer services, AT&T, Hilton Hotels Corporation, and Time Warner. Their internal revenue in 2007 was $242 million.

During his years in Los Angeles, Manatt served as president of the San Fernando Valley Bar Association, in the San Fernando Valley area of Los Angeles.

== National political life ==
In 1981, Manatt became the national chairman of the Democratic National Committee (DNC), and oversaw and executed the 1984 party convention, nominating former Vice President Walter Mondale of Minnesota for president, and New York congresswoman Geraldine A. Ferraro, making history as that marked the first time a woman was a major party nominee. The convention took place from July 16–19, 1984 in Moscone Center, San Francisco. The permanent chairman that year was Martha Layne Collins of Kentucky. Mondale was chosen on the first ballot. That year, the keynote speaker on the first evening of the convention was Governor Mario Cuomo of New York. Although the convention was considered a great success, the Mondale-Ferraro ticket could not get traction against the popularity of then-president and Republican Ronald Reagan and Vice President George H. W. Bush.

In 1987, he chaired Illinois Sen. Paul Simon's presidential campaign and co-chaired the Bill Clinton presidential campaign, 1992.

Manatt served as ambassador to the Dominican Republic from 1999 to 2001, representing the government of President Bill Clinton.

== Personal life ==
Manatt married Kathleen (Kathy) Klinkefus on December 29, 1957, in Audubon, Iowa. They then moved to Washington, D.C., where they had their first child, Michele. The family then moved to Los Angeles, where they had two boys, Timothy and Daniel. The family moved back to Washington D.C. in 1980 for Manatt's appointment as DNC Chair, while Michele was attending university, where the two boys attended and graduated from Sidwell Friends School. Manatt continued expanding the law firm, where it grew to have offices in Los Angeles, San Francisco, New York City, Washington, D.C., Orange County, California, Palo Alto, California, Sacramento, California, and Albany.

== Later life ==
At the time of his death, Manatt resided in Washington, D.C., where he helped run and work at his law firm, and was engaged in numerous civic activities. He served on various boards of directors, including that of FedEx, the Mayo Clinic, and George Washington University. Manatt sat on the Council on American Politics, which brings together leaders from across the nation to address issues facing the growth and enrichment of the Graduate School of Political Management at The George Washington University.

He had a granddaughter and grandson, Victoria, and Patrick, the children of his daughter Michele Manatt, a former U.S. State Department and White House Office of National Drug Control Policy official, and her husband Wolfram Anders, an international development investment professional. Their son Daniel, documentarian and founder of politicstv.com, has three children, Allison, Caitlin, and Charles Lucas.

== Awards and honors ==
In 1983, Manatt was awarded an honorary Doctor of Laws (LL.D.) degree from Whittier College.

== Death ==
Charles Manatt died at age 75 on the evening of July 22, 2011 in Richmond, Virginia, after prolonged illness and hospitalization.

Party political offices
Preceded by John C. White	Democratic National Committee Chairman; 1981–1985	Succeeded by Paul G. Kirk
Diplomatic posts
Preceded by Mari Carmen Aponte	United States Ambassador to the Dominican Republic; 1999–2001	Succeeded by Hans H. Hertell
