= George Howland Butler =

American diplomat

George Howland Butler (February 6, 1894 in Chicago – June 22, 1967 in Washington, D.C.) was an American Career Foreign Service Officer who was the Ambassador Extraordinary and Plenipotentiary to the Dominican Republic from 1946 until 1948.

== Publications ==
- Inter-American Relations After World War II, Issues 26–27, Volume 2379 of Department of State publication, Issue 26 of Department of State publication: Inter-American series
