= LGBTQ people in Guatemala =

Today, LGBTQ individuals are victimized and very little has been done to resolve this issue in Guatemala, and Latin America for that matter. Guatemalans who identify as queer are consistently ostracized for struggling to conform to a heteronormative society that Guatemala has instituted. Sexual minorities are denied essential services such as education and healthcare, and the Guatemalan State has done very little to provide aid to LGBTQ individuals, insinuating that Guatemala is an anti-LGBT country. The State is portrayed as not providing enough aid to protect the well-being of the LGBT community from discriminatory rhetoric and violence.

The age of consent in Guatemala, both heterosexual and homosexual, is 18.

== Guatemala's attitudes towards the LGBT community ==
The LGBT community in Guatemala is persecuted for the sexual orientations or gender identities that are disparate from the heteronormative society of Guatemala, and sexual minorities are generally not accepted by friends or family. Most of Latin America chooses to ostracize sexual minorities because of its strong roots to Catholicism. The Catholic Church has portrayed its distaste with the LGBT community, patently against pro-LGBT legislation; religious attendance and animosity toward LGBT rights is highly correlated.

There are unequivocal threats towards LGBT individuals, especially transgender women. Transgender individuals are spurned from society and their families. In fact, the State refuses to acknowledge the identities of many transgender people under Article 1 of the Civil Code of Guatemala. Article 1 allows the State to adamantly deny providing transgender individuals with documents that allow them to legally identify with the gender they identify with.

== Misconceptions about LGBT individuals ==
The State not only rejects the concept of transgender individuals as being legitimate, but the country also presumes and assigns the sex roles of men who have sex with men. These presumptions are made on stereotypes that have been manufactured by the heteronormative society and the patriarchal structures that have been instituted in Mesoamerica. Stephen Murray studied homosexual occupations in Mesoamerica by analyzing a man's employer. The study focused on whether a man's occupation, along with a man's personality, can accurately determine a man's sexual preference – a pasivo (bottom) or activo (top). Murray found that a hairdresser and ballet dancer in his sample did not portray stereotypical traits of being feminine or narcissistic. These misconceptions of men who have sex with men are made because the society of Mesoamerica presume that men who work in “feminine” occupations are notably feminine or vain. Furthermore, it is also presumed that because they are perceived feminine, they are regarded as being pasivo. However, the hairdresser and ballet dancer classified themselves as internacional (versatile). Furthermore, men who work in stereotypically “masculine” jobs such as a truck driver or a construction worker are not necessarily activo. These misconceptions of men who have sex with men are based on the traditional views on gender roles and how men who have ‘flamboyant’ jobs are feminized.

== Effect of neo-liberalization on the LGBT community ==
Based on two studies, Briggs (2010) and Horridge (2011), the neo-liberalization that occurred in Guatemalan politics benefited gay and lesbian adopters. In Guatemala, a neo-liberalization of child welfare occurred because state provisions failed and as a result had to abandon services such as subsidized health care and staple foods. In other words, because Guatemala was suffering to come up with funds to support programs that aided impoverished families with children, the children were instead placed in privatized families. The state is deemed as being desperate to conserve funds, rather than funding programs that help support impoverished families, but gay and lesbian couples planning to adopt could take advantage of the increased neo-liberalization. However, because gay and lesbian couples were matched with adoptees rather than providing aid to impoverished families, the neo-liberalization did not help resolve issues such as race, class, and gender inequalities.

== Attacks towards the LGBT community ==
There have been numerous attacks against the LGBT community in Guatemala and the State has done very little to intervene with the issue. It was reported from 1996 to 2006 that at least thirty-five LGBT individuals were murdered. From 2009 to just 2010 a startling number of at least thirty transgender people were murdered. However, these statistics are deemed to be inaccurate because the family members of LGBT victims did very little to intervene or properly report the hate crimes made towards the sexual minorities.

Furthermore, Guatemalans, gay or heterosexual, experience physical violence from organized gangs for various motives. However, gay individuals are more likely to be targeted by groups because sexual minorities can be attacked or killed with near-impunity by the state prosecution. Also, because Guatemala is a country that has been known to portray anti-gay views, it is socially acceptable for gangs to portray and act upon anti-gay discrimination and anti-gay violence.

The 152-page report ‘Every Day I Live in Fear 'documents violence experienced by LGBT people in the three Northern Central American countries collectively known as the Northern Triangle, including at the hands of gangs, law enforcement officials, and their own families.

== Healthcare ==
Providing healthcare to the LGBT community, especially homosexual and bisexual men, has always been an unwarranted issue in Guatemala. Guatemala struggles with a prevailing HIV epidemic due to the lack of services that should be provided. Nearly thirty people in Guatemala contract HIV every day and men who have sex with men have the highest incidence rate in contracting HIV (ten times). Testing resources are limited to sexual minorities in Guatemala, therefore LGBT individuals are more vulnerable and disproportionately affected by sexually transmitted infections.

Guatemala not only provides limited testing resources but also fails to provide an extensive sexual education program, a program that would also regard homosexuality and transsexuality. Sexually transmitted infections, especially HIV, is a problematic issue in Guatemala because LGBT individuals are engaging in sexual activity without a rudimentary sexual education. Therefore, the proliferation of sexually transmitted diseases increases because sexual minorities are unaware of the dangers of unprotected sex and continue to perpetuate risky behavior.

== See also ==
- LGBT rights in Guatemala
