= Robert S. Pastorino =

American diplomat

Robert Pastorino
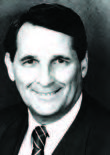

United States Ambassador to the Dominican Republic
- In office February 6, 1992 – June 28, 1994
- President: George H. W. Bush; Bill Clinton
- Preceded by: Paul D. Taylor
- Succeeded by: Donna Jean Hrinak

Personal details
- Born: Robert Stephen Pastorino; March 16, 1940; North Beach, San Francisco, California, U.S.
- Died: June 6, 2013 (aged 73); St. Helena, California, U.S.
- Spouse: Frances Estepa
- Children: 3
- Education: San Francisco State University (BA)

Robert Stephen Pastorino (March 16, 1940 – June 6, 2013) was an American diplomat who served as the United States ambassador to the Dominican Republic from 1992 to 1994.

== Early life and education ==
Pastorino was born in North Beach, San Francisco in 1940. After graduating from San Francisco Polytechnic High School, he studied engineering at City College of San Francisco, but dropped out after the first semester. He later earned a Bachelor of Arts degree from San Francisco State University.

== Career ==
Early in his career, Pastorio worked as a union electrician and teller at Wells Fargo Bank. After saving enough money, Pastorino began traveling Europe and attended the 1960 Summer Olympics. After returning to San Francisco, Pastorino enrolled at San Francisco State University. To support himself, he continued to work at Well Fargo and also as a part-time stockbroker. After graduating, Pastorino joined the United States Foreign Service in 1966 and relocated to Washington, D.C. Pastorino served as an economic and political counselor at the Embassy of the United States, Mexico City and as deputy chief of mission in the American Embassy in Tegucigalpa, Honduras. He later served as deputy assistant secretary of the United States Department of Defense and as the Latin American affairs advisor for the United States National Security Council. He served as United States ambassador to the Dominican Republic from 1992 to 1994.

== Personal life ==
Pastorino and his wife, Frances Estepa Pastorino, had three children. Pastorino died in St. Helena, California in 2013.
