= Charles S. Shapiro =

American diplomat (born 1949)

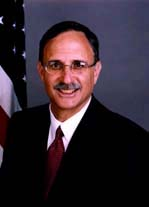

57th United States Ambassador to Venezuela
- In office 25 February 2002 – 31 August 2004
- President: George W. Bush
- Preceded by: Donna Hrinak
- Succeeded by: William Brownfield

Personal details
- Born: May 30, 1949
- Education: University of Pennsylvania, Georgia State University

Military service
- Allegiance: United States
- Branch/service: US Coast Guard Reserve
- Years of service: 1971–1977

Charles Samuel Shapiro (born May 30, 1949) is an American diplomat (serving since 1977 in a variety of capacities, primarily relating to Latin America) and a former U.S. ambassador to Venezuela (2002 - 2004). He was President of the Institute of the Americas from October 2011 to July 2014, when Ambassador Shapiro was named the President of the World Affairs Council of Atlanta.

== Education ==
Shapiro has degrees from the University of Pennsylvania (1971) and Georgia State University (1977), and served in the United States Coast Guard Reserve (1971–1977).

== Career ==
His career includes assignments abroad, including Deputy Chief of Mission in Port of Spain, Trinidad and Tobago (1991–1994) and in Santiago, Chile (1995–1998). From 1983 to 1988, Shapiro worked on El Salvador, first as Desk Officer in Washington (1983–1985) and then as Political Counselor in San Salvador (1985–1988).

In Washington, Shapiro has served in a number of capacities in the US State Department's Bureau of Western Hemisphere Affairs (called the Bureau of Inter-American Affairs until 2000): Deputy Director in the Office of Andean Affairs (1988–1990); Executive Assistant to the Assistant Secretary of State for Western Hemisphere Affairs (1994–1995); Coordinator for Cuban Affairs (1999–2001); Principal Deputy Assistant Secretary (2005–2007); head of the Western Hemisphere Trade Task Force (2007–2009); and Senior Coordinator for Economic Initiatives. Other assignments include "Division Chief for South America" in the Bureau for International Narcotics and Law Enforcement Affairs (then called the Bureau of International Narcotics Matters), 1990–1991.

=== Ambassador to Venezuela ===
Shapiro served as U.S. ambassador to Venezuela from 19 March 2002 to 21 August 2004. Weeks before the 2002 Venezuelan coup d'état attempt against Hugo Chávez and only days after assuming his position, Shapiro met with a Venezuelan trade union organization that openly pursued involvement in the coup, with the ambassador stating that the United States would not assist with the plot and only supported a change of government by democratic means. Shapiro was accused of participating in the coup, with some stating that a meeting with interim president Pedro Carmona Estanga one day after the coup. Shapiro and other U.S. sources have denied this and claim that he urged Carmona to reinstitute the dissolved National Assembly.

== Awards and recognition ==
Award or decoration	Country	Date	Note
Department of State Superior Honor Award	United States	1990	Special actions or performance for one year or longer
Presidential Meritorious Service Award	United States	2001	

== See also ==
- Shapiro (family name)
- United States-Venezuela relations

== Notes ==
Diplomatic posts
Preceded by Donna Hrinak	United States Ambassador to Venezuela; 19 March 2002 – 21 August 2004	Succeeded by William Brownfield
