= Manatt, Phelps & Phillips =

Los Angeles–based law firm

Manatt, Phelps & Phillips, LLP
- Headquarters: Los Angeles
- No. of offices: 10
- No. of attorneys: 341
- Major practice areas: General practice
- Revenue: $316.9 million (2017)
- Date founded: 1965
- Company type: LLP
- Website: www.manatt.com

Manatt, Phelps & Phillips, LLP is a Los Angeles-based law firm of more than 450 attorneys and other professionals founded in 1965. The firm earned revenues of $455.9 million in 2024. Donna L. Wilson is the firm's Chief Executive and Managing Partner. On June 11, 2018, Manatt announced that Wilson had been elected to succeed William Quicksilver as the firm's Chief Executive Officer and Managing Partner. Wilson assumed the leadership role on July 1, 2019, at which time Quicksilver became the Managing Partner Emeritus.

== History ==
Originally a banking law boutique firm, Manatt, Phelps & Phillips LLP was founded by Charles Taylor Manatt, a lawyer, politician and businessman, and Thomas Phelps, a banking and finance attorney, in Los Angeles, California as the "Manatt Law Firm". Litigation and sports lawyer Alan Rothenberg joined them soon after; Rothenberg remained a named partner in the firm until he moved to Latham & Watkins in 1990. Former U.S. Senator John V. Tunney was a named partner from 1976 until early 1987. L. Lee Phillips, an entertainment lawyer, joined the firm in 1977 and became a named partner in 1985. Democratic activist Mickey Kantor joined the firm in 1976; he was a named partner from 1991 until his departure in 1993 to become United States Trade Representative, and, later, Secretary of Commerce during the Clinton Administration.

The firm's headquarters moved to Century City, Los Angeles, on March 1, 2020.

== Pro bono work ==
Manatt's pro bono program ranked No. 23 in The American Lawyer's 2019 Pro Bono Report. The average pro bono hours per Manatt lawyer is 73.7 hours.

=== Holocaust Survivors Justice Network ===
In 2007, Manatt and Bet Tzedek launched a nationwide pro bono program, the Holocaust Survivors Justice Network, to help holocaust survivors. The Network has since assisted thousands of survivors and has grown to be the single largest coordinated pro bono effort in U.S. history. At the height of its activity in 2009, clinics operated in 31 cities across the country with the assistance of more than 100 corporate partners, providing free legal services to survivors seeking German "Ghetto Work" reparations. The Network has been recognized by the American Bar Association, the National Law Journal and the Pro Bono Institute.

=== Other Significant matters ===
- Affirmed by the 9th Circuit Court of Appeals in 2014, Manatt represented female high school athletes on a pro bono basis in a Title IX class action against Eastern San Diego County's Sweetwater Union High School District. This was the first Title IX K-12-level case to ever go to trial, and it is the first case in which a class of high school female athletes has won a summary judgment motion under Title IX on the issue of failure to provide equal participation opportunities to girls.
- In 2012, Manatt lawyers and staff spent more than 1,300 hours assisting clients of the Inner City Law Center, the only provider of legal services on skid row in downtown Los Angeles. In June 2013, the center presented Manatt and partner Margaret Levy with the Humanitarian Award for their consistent support.
- Manatt secured a victory in an environmental battle to safeguard the rights and quality of life for residents of McCloud, California, against Nestlé Waters North America. In September 2009, Nestlé abandoned its plans to build a million-square-foot bottling plant that was opposed by environmentalists and McCloud residents.

== Rankings and recognition ==
Manatt ranked 107 in the 2019 AmLaw 200 collection of largest law firms. The firm also appeared in:

- U.S. News: 11 Tier 1 national rankings and 30 Tier 1 metropolitan designations in 2020. The firm reclaimed the title of "Law Firm of the Year" for Entertainment Law - Music.
- Best Lawyers in America: 64 Manatt attorneys were named to the guide in 2019.

=== Diversity ===
- Women In Law Empowerment Forum: Manatt received WILEF's Gold Standard Certificate for eight years in the 2010s. [2011-2017, 2019]
- American Lawyer: Manatt ranked 66 out of 227 surveyed U.S. law firms in The American Lawyer's 2018 Diversity Scorecard.
- Human Rights Campaign: Manatt earned a perfect score on the HRC's 2019 Corporate Equality Index.

== Divisions ==
Manatt organizes some of its specialty practices into standalone or separate divisions, similar to an 'industry group' as opposed to the traditional law firm 'practice group' structure. The division-system's purpose is to provide counsel and advice beyond legal issues by employing non-legal experts in topics relevant to the divisions focus.

=== Manatt Health ===
Manatt Health is a division of Manatt. Manatt Health professionals provide counsel on healthcare coverage and access, healthcare information technology, healthcare financing and reimbursement, and healthcare restructuring.

Manatt Health is composed of healthcare consultants, lawyers, project managers, technology strategists, analysts and policy advisors. They frequently publish by-lined articles and speak with media on major health industry issues.

==== Notable partnerships ====
- In early 2018, Manatt Health aided the Iowa Hospital Association in seeking to change the state's Medicaid system, moving it away from the private management model established in 2016. The move ultimately failed.
- In 2016, Manatt Health worked with New York City's Health + Hospitals Corporation to evaluate its position amongst state reforms and national trends.
- Manatt Health advised the Association of American Medical Colleges on and coauthored the landmark 2014 report "Advancing the Academic Health System for the Future," which provided recommendations for academic health centers on creating a sustainable model of care while continuing to invest in teaching and research missions.

=== Manatt Financial Services ===
Manatt Financial Services is a separate division of Manatt providing advice and counsel on Manatt's original specialty area, banking and finance. In June 2019, longstanding California Department of Business Oversight Commissioner Jan Lynn Owen joined Manatt Financial Services as a senior advisor.

=== Manatt Digital ===
In May 2013, Manatt launched Manatt Digital tailored to the digital media, entertainment and advertising industries. The industry group provides general business consulting beyond typical legal services.

=== Manatt Digital Media Ventures ===
Manatt Digital Media Ventures in an investment arm of the law firm, focusing on start-ups and growth companies in and around the digital media landscape.

Manatt Digital Media Ventures makes 10-15 investments a year in early-stage companies. The firm's partners provide capital annually and also have the opportunity to personally invest alongside the fund. Since 2000, Manatt has made more than 90 investments in companies and funds focused on digital media, including Etsy, MaxPreps, Pinterest and DFJ Frontier.

== Notable Attorneys ==
- Ronald Barak (born 1943), Olympic gymnast.
- Charles Taylor Manatt, Chairman of the Democratic National Committee (1981 - 1985) and U.S. Ambassador to the Dominican Republic (1991 - 2001)
- Alan Rothenberg, President of the U.S. Soccer Federation (1990 - 1998) who oversaw the 1994 FIFA World Cup in the United States, the establishment of Major League Soccer in 1996, and is namesake of the Alan I. Rothenberg Trophy, which was awarded annually to the winner of the MLS Cup from 1996 to 2007
- John V. Tunney, U.S. Senator from California (1971 - 1977)
- Mickey Kantor, United States Trade Representative (1993 - 1996) and U.S. Secretary of Commerce (1996 - 1997)
- Justin Hughes, Legal scholar and professor.
