= Robin Bernstein =

Robin Bernstein may refer to:

- Robin Bernstein (diplomat), American businesswoman and U.S. ambassador to the Dominican Republic
- Robin Bernstein (historian), American cultural historian
