= Santo Domingo Pride =

LGBTQ event in Santo Domingo, Dominican Republic

Santo Domingo Pride Caravan
- Pride event in Santo Domingo
- Genre: Pride march
- Date: June (annually)
- Frequency: Annual
- Location: Santo Domingo
- Country: Dominican Republic
- Inaugurated: 2006

The Santo Domingo Pride Caravan is an annual demonstration held in the city of Santo Domingo, the capital of the Dominican Republic, in commemoration of International LGBT Pride Day.

The event was first held in 2006, although it was not officially authorized until 2010. The immediate precursor to the pride march was a public walk by LGBT individuals on March 31, 2000, when a group of seven members from the organization Amigos Siempre Amigos (ASA) secretly carried a rainbow flag down El Conde Street. The following year, in 2001, Gay Les Dom — the first Dominican gay and lesbian collective — scheduled the first celebration of Lesbian and Gay Pride Day for July 1.

In 2021, the 13th edition of the LGBT Pride Caravan was held. The procession, which lasted over six hours, traveled from the Malecón of Santo Domingo to Avenida El Puerto.

The 2024 edition, on the other hand, began at the Don Diego terminal on Avenida del Puerto Francisco Alberto Caamaño Deñó and concluded at the Sans Souci Convention Center, where a pride festival was held featuring both national and international performers.

== See also ==
Sexual diversity in the Dominican Republic
