= Lowell C. Kilday =

American diplomat

Lowell Kilday

United States Ambassador to the Dominican Republic
- In office September 11, 1985 – August 8, 1988
- President: Ronald Reagan
- Preceded by: Robert Anderson
- Succeeded by: Paul D. Taylor

Personal details
- Born: Lowell Charles Kilday; February 20, 1931 New Hope, Wisconsin, U.S.
- Died: August 6, 2011 (aged 80) Springfield, Virginia, U.S.
- Education: University of Wisconsin–Madison (BS)

Military service
- Branch/service: United States Army
- Unit: 1st Cavalry Division
- Battles/wars: Korean War

Lowell Charles Kilday (February 20, 1931 – August 6, 2011) was an American diplomat who served as United States ambassador to the Dominican Republic and director of the Office of Brazilian Affairs.

== Early life and education ==
Born to William and Helga Kilday in New Hope, Wisconsin, he grew up in Milwaukee, Wisconsin and graduated from North Division High School in 1948. Kilday joined the United States Army in 1950 and served a tour of duty in Korea during the Korean War as a member of the 1st Cavalry Division. Returning to the United States, he attended the University of Wisconsin–Madison, where he earned a Bachelor of Science degree in political science.

== Career ==
After graduating from college, Kilday joined the United States Foreign Service. He served tours in Cuba, Brazil, Dominican Republic, Vietnam, Angola and Costa Rica before being appointed Ambassador in 1985 by President Ronald Reagan appointed Lowell as his Ambassador to the Dominican Republic. At the end of his career, he was awarded the rank of Career Minister, the highest regular senior rank for a Foreign Service Officer.

== Death ==
Kilday died in Springfield, Virginia in 2011.
