= Convergence (Guatemala) =

Convergence Convergencia
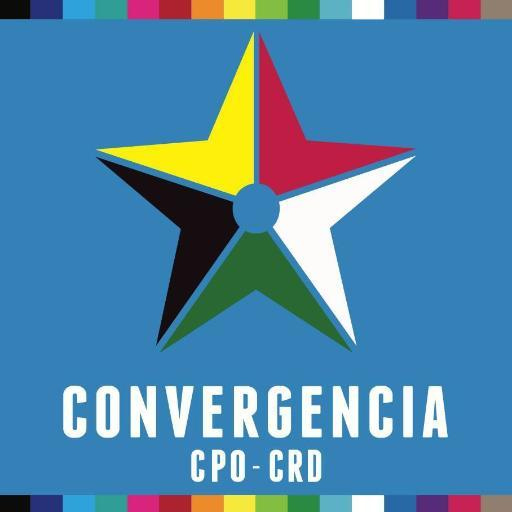
- Leader: Sandra Morán
- Secretary-General: Pablo Monsanto
- Founded: 2015
- Dissolved: 27 February 2020
- Preceded by: New Nation Alternative
- Ideology: Socialism; Progressivism; Anti-imperialism; Indigenismo
- Political position: Left-wing
- Seats in Congress: 0 / 160

Convergence (Spanish: Convergencia) was a socialist political party in Guatemala.

== History ==
In the 2015 general elections the party received 3.8% of the vote in the Congressional elections, winning three of the 158 seats.

== Election results ==
=== President ===
Election	Candidate	First round		Second round		Status
Election	Candidate	Votes	%	Votes	%	Status
2019	Benito Morales	41,800	0.95	—N/a		Lost

=== Congress ===
Election	Votes	%	Seats	+/–	Status
2015	175,515	3.85 (#10)	3 / 160	New	Opposition
2019	49,284	1.22 (#22)	0 / 160	▼3	Extra-parliamentary
