= Cristobal R. Orozco =

American diplomat

Cristobal Roberto Orozco (born 1944) served as the American Chargé d'Affaires in Brazil from February 2001 until April 2002. A career Foreign Service Officer, at the time of his appointment he held the Personal Rank of Minister-Counselor in the Senior Foreign Service.

A native of Sacramento, California, Orozco received a degree in Civil Engineering from California State University at Sacramento in 1966. He also studied at Thunderbird School of Global Management and received a B.A in 1971 and in 1983, received a Masters in Public Administration from the JFK School of Government at Harvard University. Orozco graduated from the Senior Executive Seminar, the highest level of executive training offered by the Department of State, in 1989.

== Career ==
Orozco was an engineer for the Inter-American Geodetic Survey (U.S. Army) in Panama and Colombia from 1966 to 1970. He entered the Foreign Service in 1971, serving in Tokyo, Santiago, Helsinki, Tegucigalpa, and Santo Domingo, as well as in Washington, DC.

He served as Consulate General in Rio de Janeiro from 1997 until 2000.
