= Sandra Morán =

Guatemalan politician

Sandra Morán Reyes
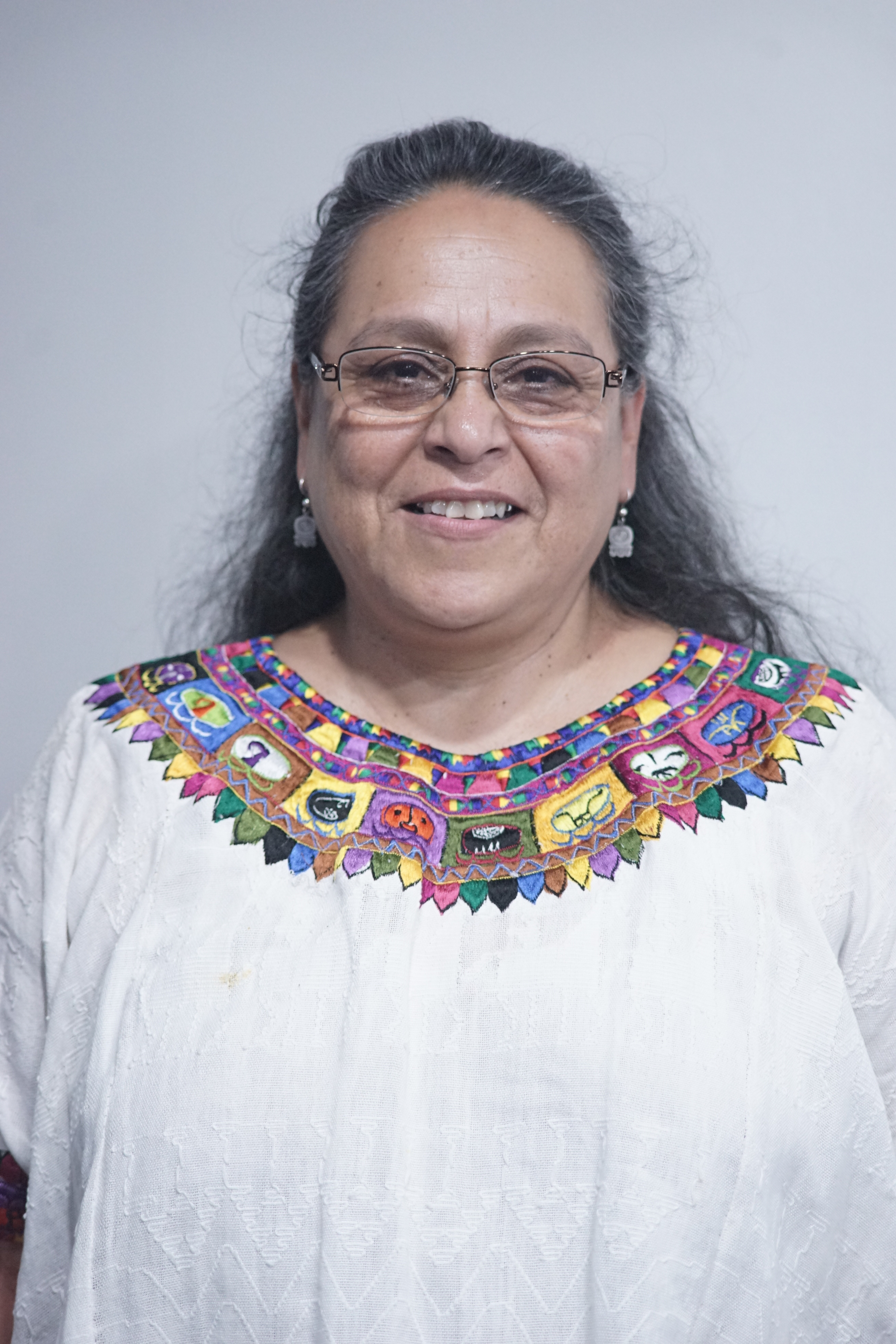
- Morán in 2018

Former Member of the Congress of Guatemala
- In office 14 January 2016 – 14 January 2020
- Constituency: Guatemala District

Personal details
- Born: 29 April 1960 (age 66)

Sandra Morán Reyes (born 29 April 1960) is a Guatemalan politician who served as deputy of the Congress of Guatemala from 2016 to 2020, following her electoral win in the 2015 general election. A member of the now-defunct Convergence party, she is noted as the first out LGBT person ever elected to the national legislature in Guatemala.

On 21 May 2019, she confirmed that she would not run for re-election.

== Life ==
Morán joined Guatemala's human rights movement in high school when she was fourteen years old. She was active in music, playing in the band Kin Lalat in the 1980s.

She previously lived in exile in Mexico, Nicaragua, and Canada between 1981 and 1994.

A longtime LGBT and feminist activist and artist, she was an organizer of Guatemala's first lesbian group in 1995 and its first LGBT pride event in 1998.
