= Manuel Villacorta =

Guatemalan politician, professor and writer

Guatemala Ambassador to Israel
- In office 24 May 1999 – 30 January 2000
- President: Álvaro Arzú; Alfonso Portillo
- Preceded by: Antonio Roberto Castellanos
- Succeeded by: Marco Tulio Zúñiga Morales

Personal details
- Born: Manuel Ricardo Villacorta Orantes; 29 March 1959 (age 67) Guatemala City, Guatemala
- Party: Independent
- Other political affiliations: Winaq (2018–2019); Will, Opportunity and Solidarity (2022–2023)
- Spouse: Ileana Recinos
- Education: Universidad de San Carlos de Guatemala; Pontifical University of Salamanca
- Website: https://www.manuelvillacorta.com.gt

Manuel Ricardo Villacorta Orantes (born March 29, 1959) is a Guatemalan former politician, professor and writer who served as Guatemala's ambassador to Israel from 1999 to 2000. Villacorta participated in the 2019 and 2023 presidential election, where he placed in seventh place on both elections, receiving 5.2% of the vote in 2019 and 5.62% in 2023.

== Early and personal life ==
Villacorta was born on March 29, 1959, in Guatemala City in the bosom of a scholar family. His father Manuel José Villacorta Escobar was an economist, who served as a professor at the Faculty of Economics of the Universidad de San Carlos. His father also served as director of the National Agrarian Bank, Vice Minister and Minister of Economy in the governments of Carlos Arana Osorio and Kjell Laugerud García.

Villacorta graduated with a degree in Political Science from the Universidad de San Carlos de Guatemala, later he studied Social Communication at the United Kingdom and a Doctorate in Political Science and Sociology at the Pontifical University of Salamanca.

== Political career ==
Villacorta was proclaimed presidential candidate by a party named Winaq, founded by Nobel Peace Prize laureate Rigoberta Menchú. Liliana Hernández was named his candidate for Vice President.

In June 2019, Villacorta was positioned in the polls with 1.2% in intention to vote, however, after the count in the general elections, he obtained 5.2% of the votes and he was placed in seventh place.

Days after the election, Villacorta broke away from Winaq and announced that he would run as the candidate for the progressive political party, VOS, that would participate in the 2023 general elections. He placed in seventh place, obtaining 5.62% of the votes.

Diplomatic posts
Preceded by Marco Tulio Zúñiga Morales	Guatemala Ambassador to Israel; 1999–2000	Succeeded by Antonio Roberto Castellanos
Party political offices
Preceded by Miguel Ángel Sandoval	Winaq nominee for President of Guatemala; 2019	Succeeded by Amílcar Pop
New political party	VOS nominee for President of Guatemala; 2023	Most recent
