= List of ambassadors of the United States to the Dominican Republic =

Ambassador of the United States of America to the Dominican Republic
- Seal of the United States Department of State

- Flag of a United States ambassador

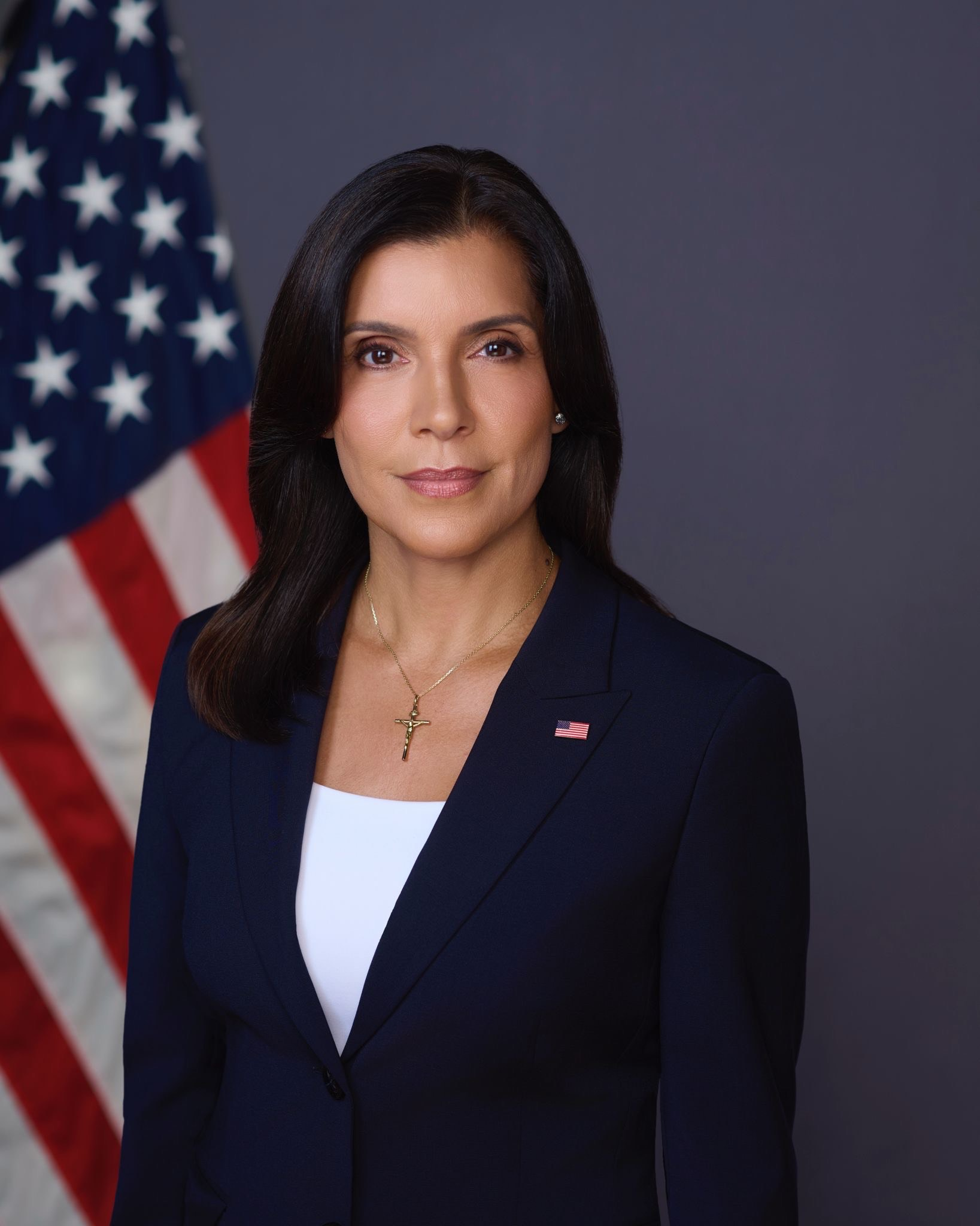
- Incumbent; Leah Campos since November 19, 2025
- United States Department of State; U.S. Embassy in Santo Domingo, Dominican Republic
- Style: Mr./Madam Ambassador (informal); The Honorable (formal)
- Type: Head of mission
- Reports to: United States Secretary of State
- Residence: Avenida Leopoldo Navarro 14
- Seat: U.S. Embassy in Santo Domingo, Dominican Republic
- Nominator: President of the United States
- Appointer: President of the United States; with Senate advice and consent
- Term length: At the pleasure of the president
- Inaugural holder: John Mercer Langston (as Chargé d'affaires)
- Formation: March 26, 1884; 142 years ago
- Deputy: Prashant Hemady (Deputy chief of mission)
- Website: do.usembassy.gov (in Spanish and English)

This is a list of ambassadors of the United States to the Dominican Republic.

== List of ambassadors ==
Name	Title	Presentation of credentials	Termination of mission	Notes
John M. Langston	Chargé d'Affaires	March 26, 1884	Transmitted recall by mail, June 23, 1885	Accredited to Santo Domingo, also accredited to Haiti; resident at Port-au-Prince.
John E. W. Thompson	Chargé d'Affaires	March 1, 1885	Relinquished charge at Port-au-Prince about October 17, 1889	Accredited to Santo Domingo, also accredited to Haiti; resident at Port-au-Prince.
Frederick Douglass	Chargé d'Affaires	January 25, 1890	Left Port-au-Prince, July 1891	Accredited to Santo Domingo, also accredited to Haiti; resident at Port-au-Prince.
John S. Durham	Chargé d'Affaires	January 14, 1892	Presented recall, November 18, 1893	Accredited to Santo Domingo, also accredited to Haiti; resident at Port-au-Prince.
Henry M. Smythe	Chargé d'Affaires	November 18, 1893	Left Santo Domingo, March 20, 1897	Accredited to Santo Domingo, also accredited to Haiti; resident at Port-au-Prince. Credentials presented on November 18, 1893, by his predecessor; Smythe was officially received in person at Santo Domingo, October 28, 1895.
William F. Powell	Chargé d'Affaires	February 18, 1898	Superseded, July 23, 1904	Accredited to Santo Domingo, also accredited to Haiti; resident at Port-au-Prince. Officially received on February 18, 1898; had transmitted credentials by mail in November 1897.
Thomas C. Dawson	Minister Resident/Consul General	July 23, 1904	Left post, May 5, 1907	Accredited to Santo Domingo.
Fenton R. McCreery	Minister Resident/Consul General	May 18, 1907	Left post, October 7, 1909	Accredited to Santo Domingo.
Horace G. Knowles	Minister Resident/Consul General	March 7, 1910	Presented recall, August 2, 1910	
William W. Russell	Minister Resident/Consul General	November 3, 1910	Promoted to Envoy Extraordinary and Plenipotentiary	
William W. Russell	Envoy Extraordinary and Minister Plenipotentiary	September 5, 1911	Left post, March 2, 1913	
James Mark Sullivan	Envoy Extraordinary and Minister Plenipotentiary	September 23, 1913	Left post, June 20, 1915	
William W. Russell	Envoy Extraordinary and Minister Plenipotentiary	October 7, 1915	Left post, September 12, 1925	
Evan E. Young	Envoy Extraordinary and Minister Plenipotentiary	October 28, 1925	Left post, December 31, 1929	
Charles B. Curtis	Envoy Extraordinary and Minister Plenipotentiary	January 28, 1930	Left post, August 11, 1931	
H. F. Arthur Schoenfeld	Envoy Extraordinary and Minister Plenipotentiary	October 9, 1931	Left post, April 27, 1937	
R. Henry Norweb	Envoy Extraordinary and Minister Plenipotentiary	October 7, 1937	Presented recall, February 13-February 19, 1940	
Robert M. Scotten	Envoy Extraordinary and Minister Plenipotentiary	June 21, 1940	Left post, March 14, 1942	
Avra M. Warren	Envoy Extraordinary and Minister Plenipotentiary	July 4, 1942	Promoted to Ambassador Extraordinary and Plenipotentiary	
Avra M. Warren	Ambassador Extraordinary and Plenipotentiary	April 17, 1943	Left post, April 22, 1944	
Ellis O. Briggs	Ambassador Extraordinary and Plenipotentiary	June 3, 1944	Left post, January 14, 1945	
Joseph F. McGurk	Ambassador Extraordinary and Plenipotentiary	April 17, 1945	Left post, November 16, 1945	
George Howland Butler	Ambassador Extraordinary and Plenipotentiary	September 19, 1946	Left post, February 5, 1948	
Ralph H. Ackerman	Ambassador Extraordinary and Plenipotentiary	August 27, 1948	Left post, June 11, 1952	
Phelps Phelps	Ambassador Extraordinary and Plenipotentiary	July 29, 1952	Left post, May 30, 1953	
William T. Pheiffer	Ambassador Extraordinary and Plenipotentiary	June 29, 1953	Left post, June 2, 1957	
Joseph S. Farland	Ambassador Extraordinary and Plenipotentiary	August 7, 1957	Left post, May 28, 1960	
Henry Dearborn	Chargé d'Affaires ad interim	Unknown	Diplomatic ties severed, August 26, 1960	U.S. severed diplomatic relations with the Dominican Republic on August 26, 1960.
John Calvin Hill	Chargé d'Affaires ad interim	January 6, 1962	Unknown	U.S. Embassy in Santo Domingo was reestablished January 6, 1962
Vinton Chapin	Ambassador Extraordinary and Plenipotentiary	June 23, 1960	Unknown	Appointed on June 23, 1960, and took oath of office, but did not proceed to post.
John Bartlow Martin	Ambassador Extraordinary and Plenipotentiary	March 9, 1962	Left post, September 28, 1963	Normal relations interrupted, September 25, 1963; new Government of the Dominican Republic still unrecognized by the U.S. when Martin left post.
W. Tapley Bennett, Jr.	Ambassador Extraordinary and Plenipotentiary	March 23, 1964	Left post, April 13, 1966	
John Hugh Crimmins	Ambassador Extraordinary and Plenipotentiary	June 29, 1966	Left post, April 16, 1969	
Francis E. Meloy, Jr.	Ambassador Extraordinary and Plenipotentiary	July 16, 1969	Left post, August 6, 1973	
Robert A. Hurwitch	Ambassador Extraordinary and Plenipotentiary	September 5, 1973	Left post, April 5, 1978	
Robert L. Yost	Ambassador Extraordinary and Plenipotentiary	May 15, 1978	Left post, June 7, 1982	
Robert Anderson	Ambassador Extraordinary and Plenipotentiary	June 22, 1982	Left post, August 3, 1985	
Lowell C. Kilday	Ambassador Extraordinary and Plenipotentiary	September 11, 1985	Left post, August 8, 1988	
Paul D. Taylor	Ambassador Extraordinary and Plenipotentiary	August 18, 1988	Left post January 9, 1992	
Robert S. Pastorino	Ambassador Extraordinary and Plenipotentiary	February 6, 1992	Left post June 28, 1994	
Donna Jean Hrinak	Ambassador Extraordinary and Plenipotentiary	July 22, 1994	Left post December 8, 1997	
Mari Carmen Aponte	Ambassador Extraordinary and Plenipotentiary	Unknown	Unknown	Nomination of April 28 withdrawn on October 5, 1998
Charles Taylor Manatt	Ambassador Extraordinary and Plenipotentiary	December 17, 1999	Left post March 1, 2001	
Hans H. Hertell	Ambassador Extraordinary and Plenipotentiary	November 29, 2001	Left post May 1, 2007	
P. Robert Fannin	Ambassador Extraordinary and Plenipotentiary	December 13, 2007	Left post January 20, 2009	
Christopher Lambert	Chargé d'Affaires ad interim	August 2009	November 17, 2010	
Raúl H. Yzaguirre	Ambassador Extraordinary and Plenipotentiary	November 17, 2010	Left post May 29, 2013	
James "Wally" Brewster Jr.	Ambassador Extraordinary and Plenipotentiary	December 9, 2013	Left post January 20, 2017	
Robin S. Bernstein	Ambassador Extraordinary and Plenipotentiary	September 3, 2018	Left post January 20, 2021	
Robert W. Thomas	Chargé d'Affaires ad interim	January 20, 2021	February 22, 2023	
Alexander Titolo	Chargé d'Affaires ad interim	February 23, 2023	May 25, 2023	
Isiah Parnell	Chargé d'Affaires ad interim	May 25, 2023	September 28, 2023	
Patricia Aguilera	Chargé d'Affaires ad interim	September 28, 2023	October 31, 2025	
Leah Campos	Ambassador Extraordinary and Plenipotentiary	November 19, 2025	Present	

== See also ==
- Dominican Republic–United States relations
- Foreign relations of the Dominican Republic
- Ambassadors of the United States

== Sources ==
- United States Department of State: Background notes on the Dominican Republic
