= P. Robert Fannin =

American politician and diplomat (born 1935)

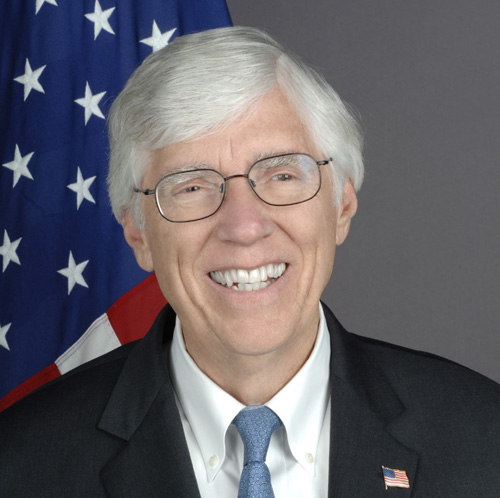
P. Robert Fannin

Paul Robert (Bob) Fannin (born 1935) is an American lawyer and former ambassador to the Dominican Republic from 2007 until 2009. He served as chairman of the Arizona Republican Party from 2001 to 2005.

== Biography ==
Fannin is the son of former Arizona governor and U.S. senator Paul Fannin. He earned a Bachelor of Arts Degree in Economics from Stanford University and a Juris Doctor Degree from the James E. Rogers College of Law at the University of Arizona from which he received the Distinguished Service Award in 1995.

== Career ==
Before his appointment as Ambassador, Fannin had a 44-year career as a lawyer in private practice (immediately before he was senior counsel at the international law firm of Steptoe & Johnson). He served as chairman of the Arizona Republican Party from June 2001 to January 2005.
