= Wally Brewster =

American diplomat (born 1960)

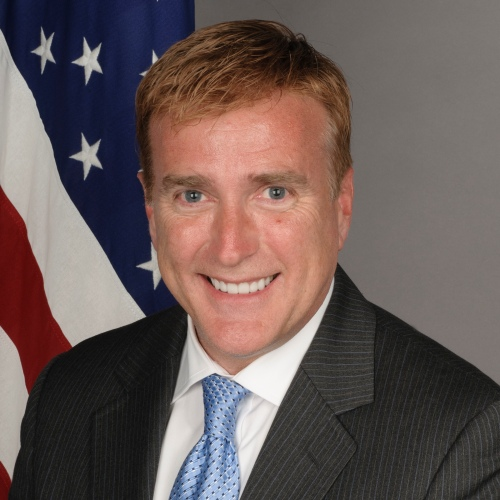

United States Ambassador to the Dominican Republic
- In office December 9, 2013 – January 20, 2017
- President: Barack Obama
- Preceded by: Raul Yzaguirre
- Succeeded by: Robin Bernstein

Personal details
- Born: 1960 (age 65–66) Lindale, Texas, U.S.
- Party: Democratic
- Spouse: Bob Satawake
- Education: Tyler Junior College; Texas A&M University

James Walter Brewster Jr. (born 1960), commonly known as Wally Brewster, served as the United States Ambassador to the Dominican Republic. He was unanimously confirmed by the Senate of the United States on November 14, 2013. Brewster was the first person in a same-sex marriage to represent the United States at the ambassadorial level in the Americas. He left office on January 20, 2017. Ambassador Brewster currently serves as a Principal for Insignias Global, an international political and brand advisory firm. He also serves on the Advisory Board for the Atlantic Council, Parliamentarians for Global Action and the National Democratic institute.

== Early life and education ==
Brewster was born in 1960. A native of Lindale, Texas, Brewster earned an A.A. in marketing at Tyler Junior College in Texas in 1980 and completed his education of Bachelor of Business Administration at Texas A&M University.

== Career ==
Brewster is an internationally recognized diplomat and business leader. He is CEO of Insignias Global and managing partner of Patino, Brewster & Partners advising and representing top political and business leaders across the globe. His career began with marketing and management positions in the Dallas area. In 1996, he moved to Chicago to work for a real estate investment trust, General Growth Properties, where he eventually became senior vice president for marketing and communications. In 2010, Brewster started his own company, SB&K Global, also based in Chicago.

In addition to his business career, Brewster served as the National Co-Chair of the LGBT Leadership Council for the Democratic National Committee and held the same role in the Obama 2012 campaign and the Biden 2020 campaign. As a fundraiser for President Barack Obama's re-election campaign, Brewster and Satawake raised over $1,000,000 in donations. Brewster was also involved with the Human Rights Campaign (HRC) for more than 30 years and served on its National Board of Directors.

President Obama nominated Brewster for the post of Ambassador to the Dominican Republic on June 21, 2013, to replace Raul Humberto Yzaguirre, who resigned in May citing health reasons. The U.S. embassy in Santo Domingo noted the nomination on its website: "This nomination, given the close relationship between Mr. Brewster and President Obama, points to the importance of the Dominican Republic to the United States." When asked how the government of the Dominican Republic viewed the nomination in light of Brewster's sexual orientation, César Pina Toribio, legal advisor to Dominican President Danilo Medina said the nomination demonstrated that the government had been consulted and not objected.

On October 31, the Senate Foreign Relations Committee cleared the nominated and sent it to the full Senate for consideration. The Senate unanimously confirmed his appointment as Ambassador to the Dominican Republic on November 14 and he was sworn in by Vice-President Joe Biden at the White House on November 22. On the evening of that day, Brewster married his partner of 25 years, luxury real estate executive, author and social activist, Bob J. Satawake. The ceremony and reception were held at the Hay-Adams Hotel, near the White House.

Upon arriving in the Dominican Republic, Brewster posted a video introducing himself and his husband on the embassy's web page.

== Ambassador to the Dominican Republic ==
The nomination of an openly gay U.S. ambassador aroused controversy in the Dominican Republic. During a July 2013 press conference, Cardinal Jesús López, referred to Brewster as a maricón, equivalent to "faggot" in American English. (Note: In April 2016, Bishop Victor Masalles, an auxiliary bishop of Santo Domingo, defended the Cardinal's language. An auxiliary Bishop of Santo Domingo, Pablo Cedano, issued a statement: "I hope he does not arrive in the country because I know if he comes he is going to suffer and will have to leave." Evangelical Christian leaders also denounced the appointment.)

U.S. Embassy spokesman Daniel Lewis Foote told reporters that Brewster was nominated "because of his skills as an international businessman and his ideas on democracy and human rights," adding, "Brewster arrives as an ambassador, he's not coming here as an activist for the gay community." The Vatican's ambassador to the Dominican Republic welcomed Brewster to the country and told him: "If you keep your private life behind the walls of your embassy, you'll be O.K. here".

On March 24, 2015, Brewster appeared on a panel of six gay U.S. ambassadors and was the only one to report a problematic reception in his host country. He said: "We knew that that's not who the Dominican people were as a whole, and I think that was important to us. Bob and I will celebrate 27 years together this year and from that perspective we both have a very strong Christian belief and so nobody is going to ever tell me that God doesn't love me."

On November 25, 2015, speaking during a Thanksgiving Day luncheon at the American Chamber of Commerce in the Dominican Republic, Brewster discussed joint efforts at improving education and public safety and in supporting investments in small business. He also said the business community needed to pressure the government to make progress in protecting the rights of women and minorities. He praised the efforts of the American Chamber and the DR business community in fighting corruption and said: "Every entrepreneur I know, either American or Dominican, mentions corruption as the biggest problem in this country. Corruption is a cancer; it retards growth, adversely affects trade and prevents the fair application of the law." He said it inhibited American investment and urged business leaders to make it an issue at the highest levels of government. He underlined the case of contributions to political campaigns: "there is no clean money from dirty people". Brewster noted that he had been criticized by some for interfering in Dominican affairs: "They say that when I speak, when I call for some action, when I speak in favor of some reform, I am violating the sovereignty of the Dominican Republic". He said his comments were essential to his role: "My job is to represent President Obama to the Dominican Republic with full authority to protect and defend the interests of the United States, its businesses and its people, while protecting human rights, enforcing international law, and promoting our bilateral relations". In words that do not appear in the transcript of the remarks, he was quoted as inviting his critics to match their rhetoric by cutting off their own ties to the U.S., saying they could "go to the [U.S.] embassy and turn in their visas".

Cardinal Nicolás de Jesús López Rodríguez, Archbishop of Santo Domingo, called Brewster's statements about corruption meddlesome (injerencistas) and accused him of promoting "the agenda of the gays, transsexuals, transvestites, and bisexuals (la agenda de los gays, transexuales, travestis y bisexuales). The Cardinal later called Brewster a "wife" who should stay in the embassy and "take care of the house", Brewster replied that the Cardinal's comments fostered hatred and marginalization and said that he would concentrate on the embassy's initiatives to promote democracy and ignore the "noise" (ruido) of his critics.

In December 2015, U.S. Senator Dick Durbin sent a letter to Pope Francis that said: "In a recent interview Cardinal Rodriguez again described the ambassador as a 'faggot' and falsely claimed the ambassador was setting out to promote 'faggotry' in the Dominican Republic." He asked the pope to prevent further attacks on Brewster by church officials.

On March 2, 2016, Brewster announced a grant from the U.S. Agency for International Development (USAID) to support a newly formed LGBT Chamber of Commerce of the Dominican Republic to support LGBT business owners. After the announcement, USAID director Alexandria L. Panehal appeared to reference LGBT candidates for public office when discussing her agency's grants. (Note: Panehal was quoted as saying: "Ustedes saben que estamos en una campaña electoral y hay algunos candidatos-como ustedes saben-que representan la ciudadanía dominicana, incluidos los miembros de la comunidad LGBT, y también el fortalecimiento de organizaciones dominicanas que representan los intereses de la comunidad LGBT en la República Dominicana". (English: "You know that we're in an election campaign and, as you all know there are some candidates representing Dominican citizenship, including members of the LGBT community, and also the strengthening of Dominican organizations representing the interests of the LGBT community in the Dominican Republic".)) After some objections from a candidate and an election official, the embassy denied the existence any such funding program in the Dominican Republic or any other country.

Later in March, the Dominican Council of Evangelical Unity held a press conference where they denounced Brewster and launched a campaign for Brewster's removal using the petition mechanism provided by the White House. The petition asked President Obama to remove Brewster as ambassador "for primarily promoting in his official duties an LGBT agenda inconsistent with the Christian cultural values and tradition of the Dominican Republic." The cited his promotion of LGBT tourism and bringing his husband on visits to public schools. They said he was using USAID funds to support LGBT activities. Ambassador Susan Rice commented: "He has the full support of this President, this White House and the entire U.S. government and I know he will continue to advocate tirelessly for the interests of the United States in the Dominican Republic. Bigotry in any form is against the universal values that we promote and does not support the social inclusion that we believe is important for a free society to succeed. We will continue to support Ambassador Brewster as he advances universal human rights."

President Danilo Medina, who was re-elected for a second term in May 2016, has not commented on Brewster or the charges made by his critics, nor has anyone in his administration.

A lawsuit seeking a court order to prevent Brewster and other embassy staff from visiting schools along with the ambassador's husband was dismissed on 5 April 2016. The judge called the suit "completely inadmissible". In late April, Auxiliary Bishop Victor Masalles said that Brewster's support of LGBT rights in the DR was an instance of "ideological colonization", a term used by Pope Francis, and that he suspected the U.S. government was pressuring Santo Domingo to modify its constitution. He said Brewster showed "an inability to distinguish his activism with his role as an ambassador" and that: "...we're suffering [from] him as a nation, as a culture, as a country that has its own uses and customs, and its own laws. He's trying to take [away] our right to national self-determination."

LGBT activists in the Dominican Republic have credited Brewster with helping to raise their visibility and remove the stigma attached to homosexuality there. A spokesperson for Human Rights First, a U.S.-based advocacy organization that reported on the status of LGBT rights in the country at the end of 2015, said: "Everyone seemed to think, even if they had mixed feelings about it, that overall it was a net positive. The presence of Ambassador Brewster has really spurred a larger conversation." One advocate for transgender rights said: "The arrival of this ambassador is the biggest thing that could have happened to us". Dominican LGBT rights activist Rosanna Marzan, executive director of Diversidad Dominicana, condemned the government's failure to respond to attacks on Brewster and wrote: "The attacks on Brewster are also attacks on us". She continued:

Those using hateful rhetoric against the ambassador have specific objectives. Among them, to quash the efforts that we as Dominican LGBT civil society activists have undertaken to defend ourselves against the hateful, violent and stigmatizing discourse orchestrated by hierarchies within the Catholic and Evangelical churches and the conservative individuals who support them.

For his work against corruption and defending Human Rights, Ambassador Brewster received numerous awards including 2016 Foreign Policy Magazines 100 Global Thinkers, 2016 OUT 100 and finalist for the Susan Cobb Award presented to top diplomats by the US State Department.

== See also ==
- LGBT rights in the Dominican Republic
- List of LGBT ambassadors of the United States

== Notes ==
Diplomatic posts
Preceded by Raul Yzaguirre	United States Ambassador to the Dominican Republic; 2013–2017	Succeeded by Robin Bernstein
