= LGBTQ people =

Sexual and gender minorities

A six-band rainbow flag representing the LGBTQ community

A more recent version of the classic rainbow flag, commonly referred to as the progress flag, with added colors to represent more identities

A third version of the rainbow flag, made to include intersex people

LGBTQ people are individuals who are lesbian, gay, bisexual, transgender, or queer. Other individuals are often included in the group, such as questioning, intersex, asexual, pansexual, aromantic, and agender, denoted under variants of the initialism "LGBTQ". The group is generally conceived as broadly encompassing all individuals who are part of a sexual or gender minority. Variants of the abbreviation, including LGBTQ+, LGBTQIA, and LGBTQIA+, are also used.

== Scope and terminology ==
LGBTQ people express a broad array of sexual and gender minority identities. The alternative umbrella gender, sexual, and romantic minorities is sometimes used for this group.

Groups that blend into the larger LGBTQ population include:

- People with a sexual orientation that is non-heterosexual, including lesbians, gay men, bisexual people, and asexual people
- People who are transgender or non-binary
- People who are aromantic
- People who are intersex
- Queer people, sometimes used as a synonym for LGBTQ people generally, sometimes as a specific identity

Common variations of the initialism include LGBT, LGBT+, LGBTQ+, LGBTQIA+, and QUILTBAG.

== Community ==
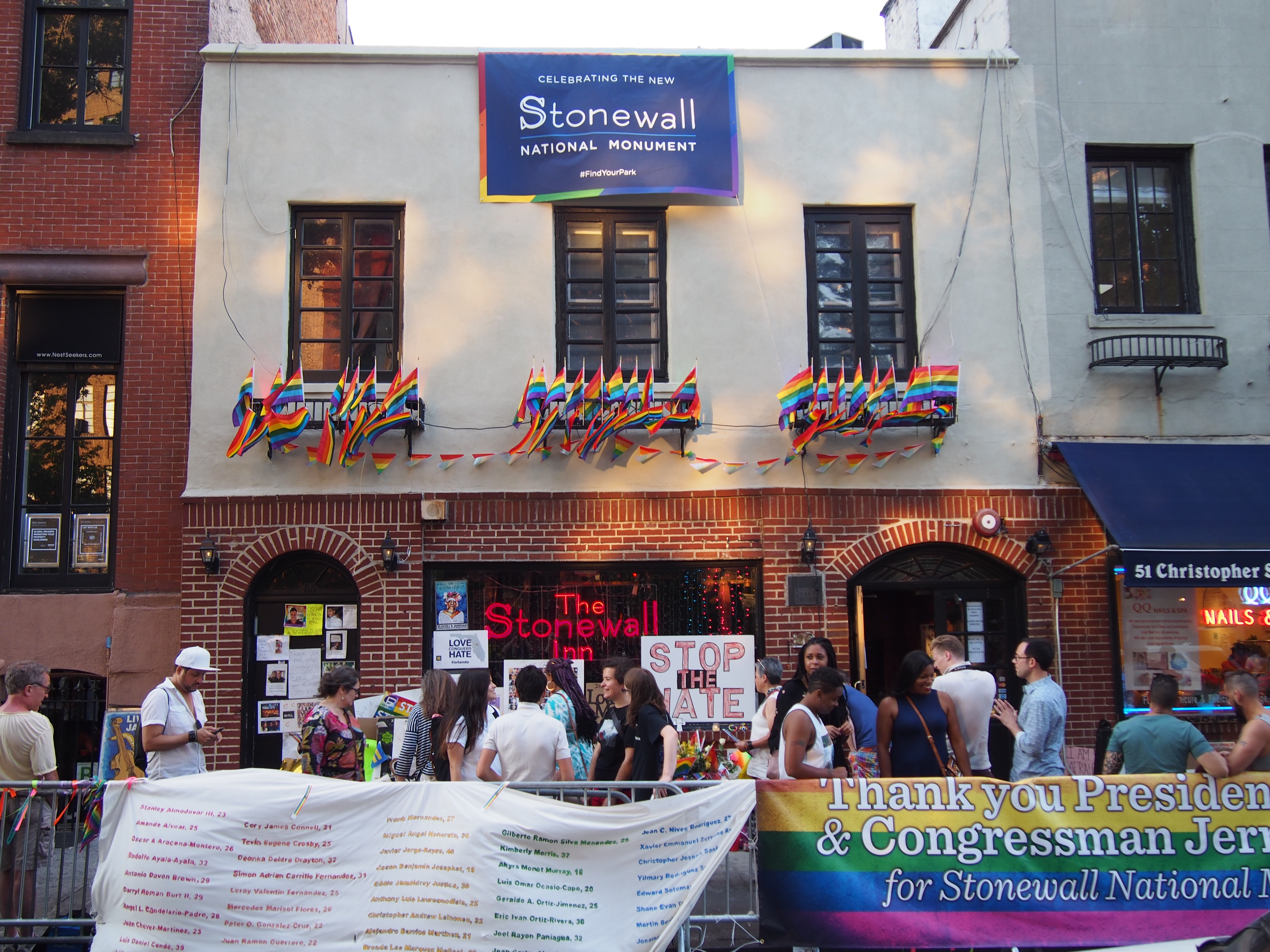
Greenwich Village, a gay neighborhood in Manhattan, is home to the Stonewall Inn, shown here adorned with rainbow pride flags.

Some LGBTQ people participate in community activities such as LGBTQ community groups, Pride events, and LGBTQ social venues. This may be defined by shared LGBTQ culture, by shared geography (such as gay villages), or by participation in LGBTQ-focused organizations. Organized LGBTQ community life can include civil-rights movements and advocacy organizations, LGBTQ student groups at U.S. colleges and universities, and, in some contexts, LGBT-affirming churches that provide spaces of acceptance and support.

== Culture ==
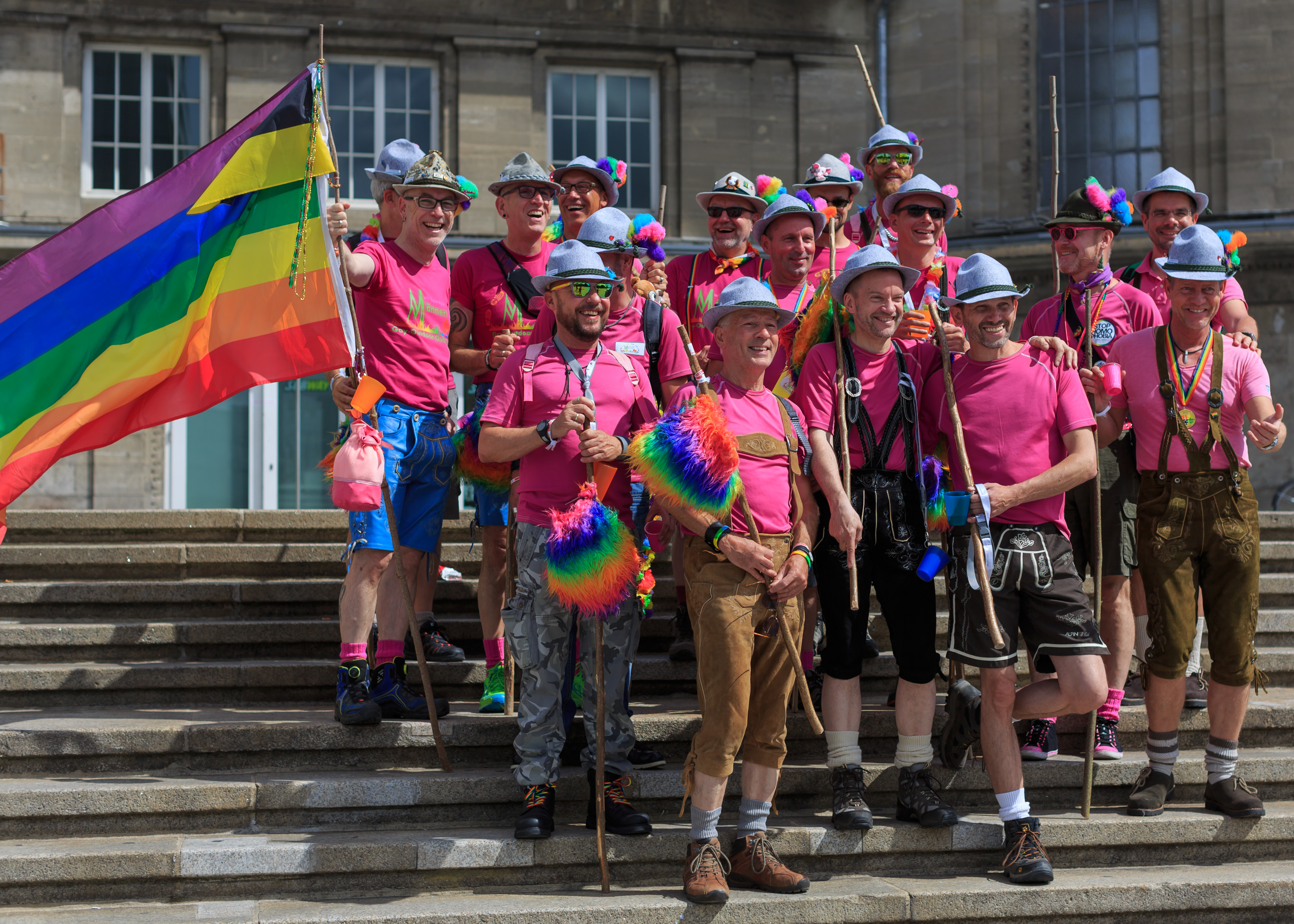
Cologne Germany Gay Pride Parade (2014)

LGBTQ culture varies widely by geography and the identity of the participants. Elements common to cultures of gay, lesbian, bisexual, transgender, and intersex people include:

- Pride movements, including pride parades
- Events such as the Gay Games and Southern Decadence
- LGBTQ media and works by LGBTQ artists, including the queer art movement
- LGBTQ-owned businesses, particularly those that cater specifically to the LGBTQ community

Not all LGBTQ people identify with LGBTQ culture; this may be due to geographic distance, unawareness of the subculture's existence, fear of social stigma or a preference for remaining unidentified with sexuality- or gender-based subcultures or communities. The Queercore and Gay Shame movements critique what they see as the commercialization and self-imposed "ghettoization" of LGBTQ culture.

== History ==
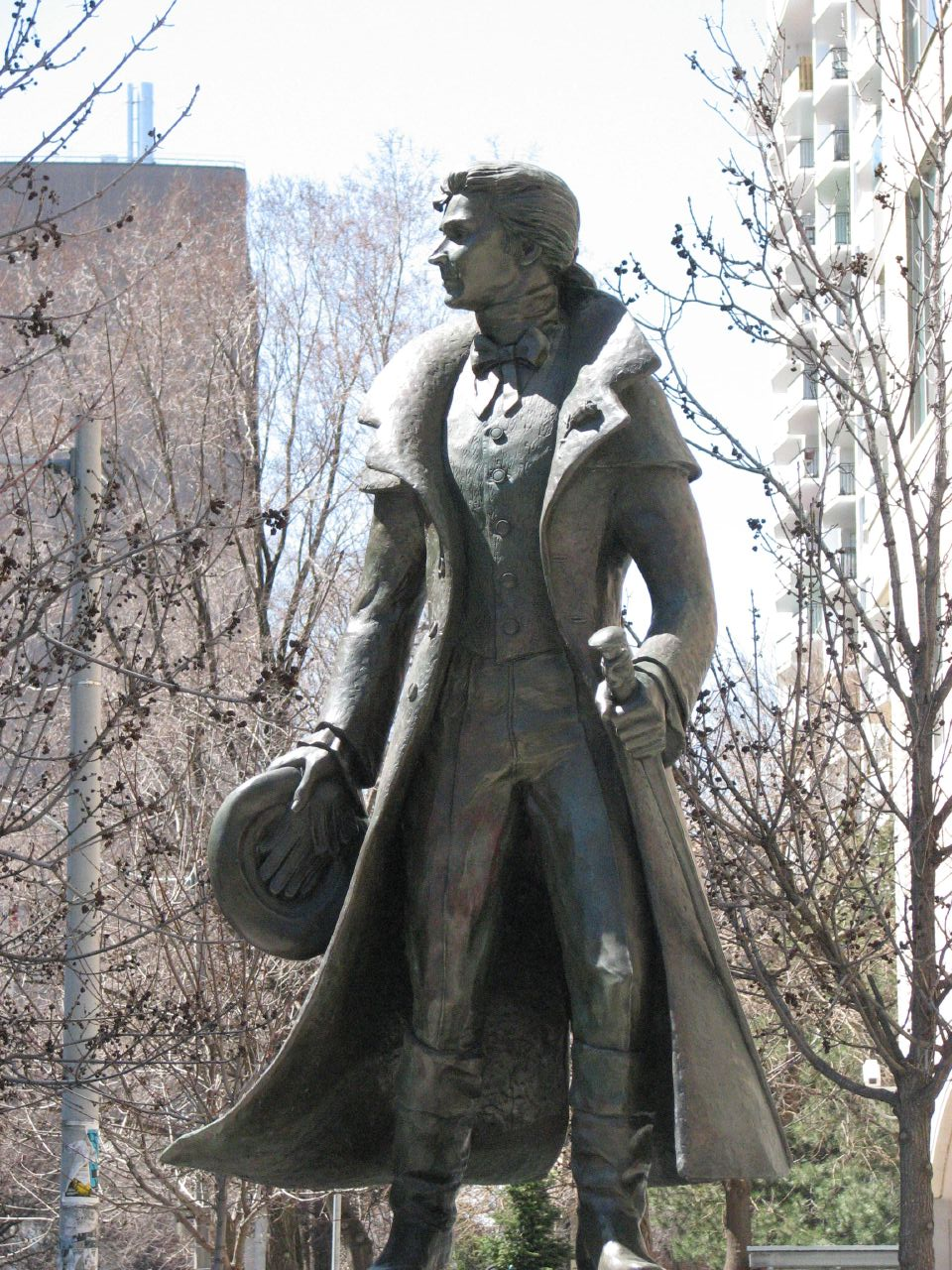
Statue of Alexander Wood, Toronto, Canada

The history of LGBTQ people dates back to the first recorded instances of same-sex love and diverse gender identities and sexualities in cultures around the world. Male and female homoerotic relations, as well as transgender expression and gender variance, have been documented globally across both premodern and modern eras, often shaped by locally specific frameworks rather than fixed identities. In many cultures, however, this history has involved sustained marginalization and persecution—intensified by colonial legal codes, religious prohibitions, and the pathologizing frameworks of modern medical science—such that these histories have only in recent decades been systematically pursued and interwoven into more mainstream historical narratives.

In 1994, the annual observance of LGBT History Month began in the United States, and it has since been picked up in other countries. This observance involves highlighting the history of the people, LGBTQ rights and related civil rights movements. It is observed during October in the United States, to include National Coming Out Day on October 11. In the United Kingdom it has been observed during February since 2005: Section 28, which had prohibited local authorities from "promoting" homosexuality was repealed in England and Wales in 2003, while the same legislation (named Section 2a in the Scottish legislation) was repealed by the Scottish parliament in 2000. A celebrated achievement in LGBTQ history occurred when Queen Beatrix signed a law making Netherlands the first country to legalize same-sex marriage in 2001, and another when Ireland became the first country to legalise same-sex marriage by popular vote in 2015.

== Rights ==
The legal rights held by LGBTQ people vary greatly by country or jurisdiction—ranging from the legal recognition of same-sex marriage to the death penalty for homosexuality. An example of such protections are legal prohibitions against incitement to hatred and violence against LGBTQ people.

Laws that affect LGBTQ people include:

- legal recognition of same-sex marriage
- laws concerning same-sex parenting, including same-sex adoption
- anti-discrimination laws in employment, housing, education, public accommodations
- hate crime laws imposing enhanced criminal penalties for prejudice-motivated violence against LGBTQ people
- bathroom bills affecting access to sex-segregated facilities by transgender people
- sodomy laws that penalize consensual same-sex sexual activity
- laws concerning access to gender-affirming surgery and gender-affirming hormone replacement therapy
- legal recognition and accommodation of the affirmed gender

Even in jurisdictions with strong protections for LGBTQ rights, they may still be subject to discrimination against LGBTQ people.

== Discrimination ==
Discrimination against LGBTQ people can manifest in legal, institutional, and social forms. This includes discrimination directed specifically at lesbians, at homosexuals more broadly, at gay men, at bisexuals, at transgender people, at asexual people, at intersex people, and at non-binary people.

Opposition to LGBTQ rights exists worldwide. While laws are "a necessary foundation to achieve equality ... protections under the law are not sufficient to eliminate prejudice", and "social equality is not synonymous with equality under the law", according to Ilan Meyer. According to a study by the European Parliament's internal policy body in 2012: "To resolve the vast majority of problems faced by LGBTI people, individuals, society, organisations and authorities must stop regarding their differences as factors which require differential treatment. While this seems self evident, such shifts in attitude cannot be achieved through one-off, short term action, nor through legislation alone. ... in some areas a change of views of some groups may simply not be possible."

Some countries practice censorship of LGBTQ issues.

Social divides exist over the social acceptance of LGBTQ people, including societal attitudes toward homosexuality.

== Movements ==
LGBTQ movements are social movements that advocate for the inclusion, recognition, and rights of LGBTQ people. These movements work to secure legal rights, or enact broader social changes aimed at advancing equality and inclusion. In addition, LGBTQ movements and communities work to advance LGBTQ culture.

== Health ==
LGBTQ people may face disparities in access to care, targeted public health interventions, and the impact of stigma on physical and mental well-being. The psychology of LGBTQ people covers aspects such as identity development including the coming out process, parenting and family practices and support for LGBTQ individuals.

== By country ==
- LGBTQ people in Australia
- LGBTQ people in Brazil
- LGBTQ people in Canada
- LGBTQ people in Chile
- LGBTQ people in Colombia
- LGBTQ people in the Dominican Republic
- LGBTQ people in Guatemala
- LGBTQ people in Mexico
- LGBTQ people in New Zealand
- LGBTQ people in Thailand
- LGBTQ people in the United Kingdom
- LGBTQ people in the United States

== See also ==
- Outline of LGBTQ topics
