= Steele (surname) =

Steele is a surname, and may refer to:

== A ==
- A. W. Steele (1862–1925), American political cartoonist
- Aaron Steele (footballer, born 1983), English football player active in Canada
- Aaron Steele (footballer, born 1987), English football player
- Abram B. Steele (1845–1913), American lawyer and politician
- Adam Steele (born 1980), American sprinter
- Alfred E. Steele (born 1954), American politician
- Alfred Nu Steele (1901–1959), American businessman and husband of Joan Crawford
- Alfonso Steele (1817–1911), one of the last surviving Republic of Texas veterans
- Alison Steele (1937–1995), American radio personality
- Allen Steele (born 1958), American science fiction author
- Amanda Steele (born 1999), American video blogger, model and actress
- Anne Steele (1717–1778), English hymnwriter and essayist

== B ==
- Barbara Steele (born 1937), British actor
- Bobbie L. Steele (born 1937), American politician
- Bobby Steele (born 1956), American punk guitarist
- Brendan Steele (born 1983), American golfer

== C ==
- Cassie Steele (born 1989), Canadian actress
- Charles Steele Jr. (born 1946), American politician
- Charles Steele (RAF officer) (1897–1973), Royal Air Force Air Marshal
- Charles Steele (lawyer) (1857–1939), American lawyer
- Charles Kenzie Steele (1914–1980), American civil rights activist
- Charles R. Steele (1933–2021), American engineer
- Charles W. Steele (1858–1943), American politician
- Charlie Steele Jr. (1930–2008), New Zealand footballer
- Charlie Steele Sr., New Zealand footballer
- Chauncey Steele Jr. (1914–1988), American tennis player
- Chauncey Steele III (born 1944), American tennis player
- Chester I. Steele (1913–1967), United States Navy rear admiral
- Chris Steele (musician), Canadian bassist of rock band Alexisonfire
- Chris Steele (doctor) (born 1945), British television doctor
- Chrissy Steele, Canadian rock singer
- Christopher Steele (born 1964), British intelligence officer, author of the Steele dossier
- Christopher Steele (artist) (1733–1768), English painter
- Chuck Steele (American football) (born 1964), American football player
- Claude Steele (born 1946), American social psychologist and academic

== D ==
- Dale Steele (born 1955), American college football coach and player
- Daphne Steele (1929–2004), Guyanese nurse and midwife, first Black matron in the English National Health Service
- Dave Steele (1974–2017), American racecar driver
- David Steele (disambiguation)
- David Steele (musician) (born 1960), British bassist of the bands The Beat and Fine Young Cannibals
- Dawn Steele (born 1975), Scottish actress
- Dominic Steele, Australian Anglican minister, author and presenter of the course Introducing God used in Australia and worldwide
- Don Steele (1936–1997), American disc jockey
- Donald Steele (1892–1962), Australian cricketer and doctor
- Donnie Steele, member of the American band Slipknot
- Doug Steele, Canadian politician first elected in 2016
- Duane Steele (born 1968), Canadian country singer

== E ==
- Elijah Steele (1817–1883), American politician
- Elmer Steele (1886–1966), American baseball player
- Elmes Yelverton Steele (1781–1865), British naval officer
- Eric Steele (born 1954), English football player and coach
- Esther Baker Steele (1835–1911), American educator, author, editor and philanthropist

== F ==
- Fletcher Steele (1885–1971), American landscape architect
- Florence Harriet Steele (1857–1948), British artist
- Franklin Steele (c. 1813–1880), American settler
- Frederick Steele (1819–1868), Union general during the American Civil War
- Freddie Steele (1912–1984), American boxer and film actor
- Freddie Steele (footballer) (1916–1976), English footballer and football manager

== G ==
- George Steele (disambiguation)
- Gile Steele (1908–1952), Hollywood costume designer
- Gordon Charles Steele (1891–1981), English Royal Navy captain awarded the Victoria Cross
- Guy L. Steele Jr. (born 1954), American computer scientist and author

== H ==
- Harper Steele (born 1961), American television writer
- Harry Steele (businessman) (1929–2022), Canadian entrepreneur and businessman
- Helen Steele (1894–?), American music composer
- Henry J. Steele (1860–1933), American politician

== I ==
- Chester I. Steele (1913–1967), United States Navy rear admiral
- Iron Mike Steele (1955–2007), American professional wrestler
- Isaac Nevett Steele (1809–1891), American diplomat and lawyer
- Isobel Steele (born 2000), English actress
- Ivy Newman Steele (1908–1974), American artist

== J ==
- Jack Steele (disambiguation)
- Jadrien Steele (born 1974), American actor, author and film director
- Jahna Steele (1958–2008), American transgender entertainer and Las Vegas showgirl
- James Steele (disambiguation)
- Jason Steele (disambiguation)
- Jeffrey Steele (born 1961), American country music singer and songwriter
- Jeffrey Steele (artist) (1931–2021), British painter
- Jevetta Steele (born 1962), American R&B jazz and gospel music singer
- Jim Steele (footballer) (born 1950), Scottish footballer
- Jimmy Steele (American football) (1909–1980), American college player
- Jimmy Steele (dentist) (1962–2017), British dentist
- Jimmy Steele (Irish republican) (1907–1970), Irish Republican Army militant
- Joel Dorman Steele (1836–1886), American textbook writer with his wife Esther Baker Steele
- Johannes Steele (1908–1988), German-born American journalist, writer and alleged Soviet spy
- John Steele (disambiguation)
- John N. Steele (1796–1853), American politician
- John Yellow Bird Steele (born 1945), Native American tribal president
- Johnny Steele (racing driver) (born 1934), American racing driver
- Jonathan Steele (disambiguation)
- Joseph Steele (1881–?), Canadian politician and carpenter
- Joseph H. Steele (1836–1913), American politician and businessman
- Josh Steel (born 1997), British basketball player
- Joshua Steele (c. 1700–1796), Irish planter and writer, British linguist of the 18th century
- Joshua Steele, English dubstep musician known as Flux Pavilion
- Joyce Steele (1909–1991), Australian politician
- Justin Steele (1935–2019), American baseball player in the All-American Girls Professional Baseball League

== K ==
- Karen Steele (1931–1988), American actress and model
- Kevin Steele (born 1958), American college football coach and player
- Kevin Steele (politician), American politician elected in 2022

== L ==
- Larry Steele (born 1949), American National Basketball Association player
- Larry Steele (producer) (1913–1980), American songwriter, composer and impresario dubbed the "Black Flo Ziegfeld"
- Lee Steele (born 1973), English footballer
- Leslie Jasper Steele (1868–1929), American politician
- Luke Steele (disambiguation), multiple people

== M ==
- Mandy Steele, American politician
- Marc Steele (born 1980), American Anglican bishop
- Markus Steele (born 1979), American National Football League player
- Martin Steele (born 1962), English middle-distance runner
- Martin R. Steele (born 1946), United States Marine Corps lieutenant general
- Mary Steele (1678–1718), Welsh prolific letter writer to her husband
- Mary E Steele (1936–2020), English traveller and natural history collector
- Mary Q. Steele (1922–1992), American writer and naturalist
- Michael Steele (born 1958), American politician
- Michael Steele (musician) (born 1955), American musician
- Michele Steele (born 1978), American television anchor and reporter
- Michelle Steele (born 1986), Australian skeleton racer

== N ==
- Nancy Steele (1923–2001), Sierra Leonean politician and labour activist
- Nathan Steele (born 2001), Canadian curler

== O ==
- Ollie Steele (born 1993), English cricketer
- Orie Steele (1887–1960), American motorcycle racer
- Orlo K. Steele (born 1932), U.S. major general

== P ==
- Paul Steele (born 1957), Canadian Olympic champion rower
- Philippa M. Steele, classical scholar and linguist
- Peter Steele (born 1962), American musician

== R ==
- Ray Steele (disambiguation)
- Raymond Steele (1917–1993), Australian rules footballer
- Richard Steele (disambiguation)
- Riley Steele (born 1987), American pornographic actress
- Robert Steele (disambiguation)
- Rocco Steele (born 1964), American gay pornographic actor
- Ronald Steele (born 1986), American basketball player
- Rowena Granice Steele (1824–1901), American actress, singer, author, newspaper journalist, editor and publisher, saloon keeper and theater operator
- Ryan Steele (disambiguation)

== S ==
- Sage Steele (born 1972), American sports television anchor
- Sam Steele (1849–1919), Canadian legendary military and law enforcement officer
- Samantha Steele (born 1985), American sportscaster
- Selena Steele, member of the Adult Video News Hall of Fame
- Selma Neubacher Steele (1870–1945), American educator and writer
- Shelby Steele (born 1946), African-American author, columnist, documentary filmmaker and academic
- Susan J. Swift Steele (1822–1895), American social reformer
- Sydnee Steele (born 1968), American sex therapist, author, free speech activist and pornographic actress

== T ==
- Terence Steele (born 1997), American football player
- Theodore Clement Steele, Hoosier Group impressionist artist
- Thomas Steele (disambiguation)
- Tim Steele (disambiguation)
- Timothy Steele (born 1948), American poet
- Tom Steele (politician) (1905–1979), Scottish politician
- Tom Steele (stuntman) (1909–1990), Scottish-born stuntman and actor
- Tracy Steele, American politician
- Tracey Steele, American politician
- Travis Steele (born 1981), American basketball coach

== V ==
- Valerie Steele (born 1955), American fashion historian and curator

== W ==
- Walter Leak Steele (1823–1891), American politician
- Walter S. Steele (died 1962), American magazine editor and publisher and anti-communist, anti-immigration activist
- William Steele (disambiguation)
- William O. Steele (1917–1979), American writer

== Z ==
- Zulma Steele (1881–1979), American artist

== Fictional characters ==
- Chloe Steele, in the Left Behind series of novels by Tim LaHaye and Jerry B. Jenkins
- Rayford Steele, de facto protagonist in the Left Behind series of novels by Tim LaHaye and Jerry B. Jenkins
- Remington Steele, title character of the TV series of the same name
- Tyler Steele, in the TV series VR Troopers

== See also ==
- General Steele (disambiguation)
- Justice Steele (disambiguation)
- Senator Steele (disambiguation)
- el Steele (wrestler)
- Steele (given name)
- Steele (disambiguation)
