= Charles Steele =

Charles Steele may refer to:

- Charles Steele (RAF officer) (1897–1973), World War I British flying ace
- Charles Steele (lawyer) (1858–1939), American lawyer with J.P. Morgan & Co.
- Charles Kenzie Steele (1914–1980), American preacher and civil rights activist
- Charles R. Steele (1933–2021), American mechanical engineer
- Charles Steele Jr. (born 1946), American businessman, politician, and civil rights leader
- Charlie Steele Jr. (1930–2008), New Zealand football player
- Charlie Steele Sr., New Zealand football player
- Charles W. Steele (1858–1943), American lawyer and politician, member of the Virginia Senate
- Chuck Steele (American football) (Charles Anson Steele, born 1964), American football player

== See also ==
- Charles Steel (1901–1993), British Army officer and civil servant
- Steele (surname)
