= Stoll =

Stoll is a surname. Notable people with the surname include:

- Arthur Stoll (1887–1971), Swiss biochemist
- Barbara J. Stoll, American pediatrician and professor
- Cal Stoll (1923–2000), American college football player and coach
- Caroline Stoll (born 1960), American tennis player
- Caspar Stoll (probably between 1725 and 1730–1791), naturalist and entomologist
- Chris Stoll (born 1998), American football player
- Clifford Stoll (born 1950), American astronomer
- David Stoll (anthropologist) (born 1952), American anthropologist
- David Stoll (composer) (born 1948), English composer and educator
- Elmo Stoll (1944–1998) Amish bishop and writer
- George Stoll (artist) (born 1954), American visual artist
- Gloria Stoll Karn (1923–2022), American graphic artist,
- Günther Stoll (1924–1977), German actor
- Hermann Stoll (1904–1944), German geologist and prehistorian
- Inge Stoll (1930–1958), German motorcycle racer
- Ira Stoll (born 1972), American journalist and columnist
- Jack Stoll (born 1998), American football player
- James Stoll (1936–1994), Unitarian Universalist minister, first ordained minister of an established denomination in the US or Canada to come out as gay
- Jarret Stoll (born 1982), Canadian ice hockey player
- Jon Stoll (1953–2008), concert promoter and producer
- Maximilian Stoll (1742–1787), Austrian physician
- Michael Stoll, American economist and professor
- Oswald Stoll (1866–1942), Australian-born British theatre manager and co-founder of the Stoll Moss theatre group
- Otto Stoll (1849–1922), Swiss linguist and ethnologist
- Pablo Stoll (born 1974), Uruguayan film director
- Paul Stoll (born 1985), American-Mexican basketball player
- Philip H. Stoll (1874–1958), American politician
- Randy Stoll (born 1945), American basketball player
- Steve Stoll (musician) (born 1967), American techno musician and label owner
- Steve Stoll (politician) (born 1947), American politician
- Willi-Peter Stoll (1950–1978), German terrorist (Red Army Faction)

== See also ==
- Stoll Pictures, a British film company of the silent era
- Stoll, Kentucky, unincorporated community
- Stoll kidnapping, 1934 kidnapping
- Stol (disambiguation)
- Stole (disambiguation)
- Stolle, a surname
