= Steele =

Steele may refer to:

== Places ==
=== United States ===
- Steele, Alabama, a town
- Steele, Arkansas, an unincorporated community
- Steele, Kentucky, an unincorporated community
- Steele, Missouri, a city
- Lonetree, Montana, a ghost town originally called Steele
- Steele, North Dakota, a city
- Steele City, Nebraska, a village
- Steele County, Minnesota
- Steele County, North Dakota
- Steele Butte, a summit in Utah

=== Canada ===
- Steele Lake (Alberta), Canada
- Mount Steele, Yukon, Canada

=== Canada and the United States ===
- Steele Township (disambiguation)
- Steele Lake (disambiguation)

=== Germany ===
- Steele, Essen, a suburb of Essen

=== Antarctica ===
- Mount Steele (Antarctica), Oates Land
- Steele Island, Palmer Land

== People ==
- Steele (surname), a list of people with the name
- Steele (given name), a list of people
- Peter Steele, stage name of American musician Peter Ratajczyk (1962–2010)
- Tommy Steele, stage name of Thomas Hicks (born 1936), regarded as Britain's first teen idol and rock and roll star
- Steele, half of Smif-N-Wessun, an American hip hop duo
- George Steele, ring name of American professional wrestler William James Myers (1937–2017)
- George Gilliam Steele, an American architect in Huntsville, Alabama (1798 – 1855)
- Sean Morley (born 1971) pro-wrestler who wrestled under the ring name "el Steele"
- Lexington Steele, stage name of American pornographic actor Clifton Todd Britt (born 1969)

== Other uses ==
- USS Steele (DE-8), a World War II destroyer escort
- Steele (supercomputer), at Purdue University
- Steele Prize, awards given by the American Mathematical Society
- Steele baronets, an extinct title in the Baronetage of Ireland
- Steele Barracks (disambiguation)
- Steele House (disambiguation), various houses on the US National Register of Historic Places

== See also ==
- Fort Steele, British Columbia, Canada, a heritage town
- Steeles Avenue, a street in Ontario
- Steel (disambiguation)
- Steal (disambiguation)
- Stele
