= Steel (disambiguation) =

Steel is a metal alloy that is composed principally of iron and carbon.

Steel may also refer to:

== Metal and Metallurgy ==
=== Specific iron alloys ===
- Low alloy steel, steel alloyed with other elements
- Carbon steel, also called plain carbon steel, a combination of iron and carbon
- Damascus steel, a variety of steel used between 900 and 1600 for making swords
- Stainless steel, a variety of steel containing at least 10.5% chromium

=== Steel grades ===
- Steel grades, to classify steels by their composition and physical properties
- AISI steel grades, American Iron and Steel Institute (AISI) standard steel grades

=== Other metal objects ===
- Firesteel for generating of sparks by impacts with flints
- Honing steel, a rod used for realigning the microscopic edge of blades
- Steel guitar, a special type of guitar and a special way of playing it
- Steel, a device held against the strings when playing a steel guitar
- Sword, sometimes termed "steel" in certain cultures
- Steel belt, used in many industries such as food, chemical, wood processing and transportation.

=== Steel related ===
- Steel abrasive, loose particles used for blast cleaning or to improve the properties of metal surfaces

== People ==
- Steel (surname)
- Two American professional wrestlers who used the stage name Steel:
  - Sean Morley (born 1971)
  - Kevin Nash (born 1959)
- Steel (Gladiators UK), stage name used by Zack George on Gladiators

== Places ==
- Steel Pier, an amusement boardwalk pier in Atlantic City, New Jersey
- 4713 Steel, a rare-type Hungaria asteroid from the inner regions of the asteroid belt

== Arts, entertainment, media ==
- Steel (video game), a 1989 science fiction shoot 'em up

=== Fictional characters ===
- Steel (comics), a name used by several fictional characters in DC Comics
- Steel Brightblade, a fictional character in the Dragonlance novels
- Steel Wool, a character from Scott the Woz

=== Film and television ===
- Steel (1933 film), an Italian drama film directed by Walter Ruttmann
- Steel (1979 film), a drama film directed by Steve Carver
- Steel (1997 film), an American film based on the DC Comics character
- Steel (2012 film), an Italian drama film directed by Stefano Mordini
- Steel (TV channel), an Italian TV channel
- "Steel" (The Twilight Zone), a 1963 television episode

=== Music ===
- Steel (band), a power metal project by Dan Swanö and Opeth members
- Steel (Battle Beast album), 2012
- Steel (soundtrack), from the 1997 film

== Other ==
- Steel (pusher), a Finnish pusher vessel
- Steel (web browser), a defunct web browser for Android
- Steel blue, a dark blue-gray color
- Steel Dome, Turkish air defense system
- Southern Steel (netball), a New Zealand netball team

== See also ==
- Steele (disambiguation)
- Steal (disambiguation)
- Dr. Steel (disambiguation)
- Steel Lake (disambiguation)
- Steel Town (disambiguation)
- De Stijl
- Sapphire & Steel, British television series
- British Steel (album), album by Judas Priest
