= Andrew Steele (disambiguation) =

Andrew Steele is an athlete.

Andrew Steele may also refer to:

- Andrew Steele (astrobiologist)
- Andrew Steele of The Herd
- Harper Steele, American writer formerly known as Andrew Steele

== See also ==
- Steele (surname)
