= David Steele =

David Steele may refer to:

- David Steele (minister) (1803–1887), Irish-born American theologian and Covenanter minister
- David Steele (cricketer, born 1869) (1869–1935), English-born Scottish cricketer
- David Steele (footballer) (1894–1964), Scottish football player and manager
- David Steele (historian) (1934–2019), British historian
- David Steele (cricketer) (born 1941), English cricketer
- David Steele (sports announcer) (born 1953), American TV and radio sportscaster and play-by-play TV announcer
- David Steele (musician) (born 1960), British bassist for The Beat and Fine Young Cannibals
- Dave Steele (1974–2017), American race car driver
- David Ramsay Steele (born 1944), Libertarian author

== See also ==
- David Steel (disambiguation)
- Steele (surname)
