= John Steele =

John Steele may refer to:

== Politics ==
- John Steele (Mississippi politician) (c. 1755–1817), territorial secretary and speaker
- John Steele (Nova Scotia politician) (died c. 1762), surgeon and political figure in Nova Scotia
- John Steele (North Carolina politician) (1764–1815), U.S. Representative from North Carolina
- John Hardy Steele (1789–1865), Governor of New Hampshire
- John Nevett Steele (1796–1853), U.S. Congressman from Maryland
- John B. Steele (1814–1866), U.S. Representative from New York
- John Yellow Bird Steele (born 1945), president of the Oglala Sioux Tribe

== Sports ==
- John Steele (cricketer, born 1905) (1905–1990), English cricketer
- Johnny Steele (1916–2008), Scottish footballer and football manager
- John Steele (cricketer, born 1946) (born 1946), English cricketer
- John Steele (ski jumper) (1909–1996), American Olympic ski jumper

== Other people ==
- John Steele (pioneer) (1821–1903), Mormon pioneer and doctor
- John Washington Steele (1843–1920), Coal Oil Johnny, oilman
- John Steele (paratrooper) (1912–1969), American paratrooper
- John Steele (oceanographer) (1926–2013), British oceanographer
- John E. Steele (1949–2026), American judge
- John Steele (historian), British historian of science

== Other uses ==
- John Steele (comics), Marvel comics character
- John Steele, Adventurer, a 1940s radio program

== See also ==
- Jack Steele (disambiguation)
- John Steel (disambiguation)
- Jonathan Steele (disambiguation)
