= General Steele =

General Steele may refer to:

- Clive Steele (1892–1955), Australian Army major general
- Frederick Steele (1819–1868), Union Army major general
- Harry L. Steele (1874–1938), U.S. Army major general
- James Steele (British Army officer) (1894–1975), British Army general
- Martin R. Steele (born 1946), U.S. Marine Corps lieutenant general
- Orlo K. Steele (born 1932), U.S. Marine Corps major general
- Sam Steele (1848–1919), Canadian Army major general
- Thomas Montagu Steele (1820–1890), British Army general
- William Steele (Australian Army officer) (1895–1966), Australian Army major general
- William Steele (Confederate general) (1819–1885), Confederate States Army brigadier general
- William B. Steele (born 1929), U.S. Army major general
- William M. Steele (fl. 1960s–2000s), U.S. Army lieutenant general

== See also ==
- John Miles Steel (1877–1965), Royal Air Force general
- General Steel Industries, American steel company founded as General Steel Castings Corporation in 1928
