= Steel Town =

Steel Town or variant may refer to:

Steel Town

- Steel Town (Karachi), a residential area for employees of Pakistan Steel Mills, Karachi
- Steel Town (1950 film), a Czech drama film directed by Martin Frič
- Steel Town (1952 film), a 1952 film directed by George Sherman

Steeltown

- Steeltown (1984 album), album by Big Country
- Steeltown, nickname for the city of Hamilton, Ontario, in Canada

== See also ==
- Steel (disambiguation)
- Steel City
- Steelville
- Steelton
- Steele (disambiguation)
- Steele City
- Steeleville
- Fort Steele
