= Mildred Lane Kemper Art Museum =

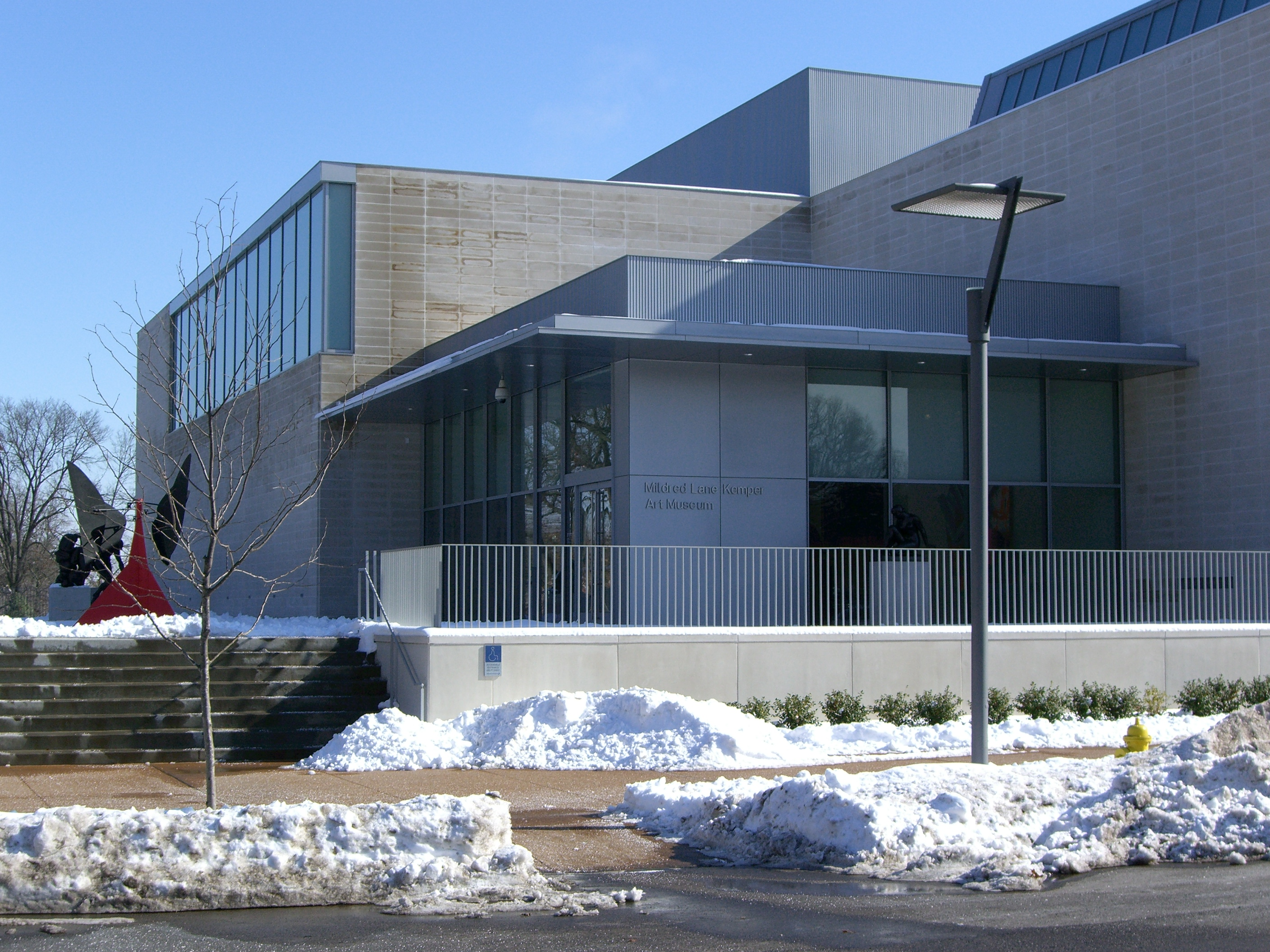
- Location: St. Louis, Missouri
- Coordinates: 38.6472°N 90.3026°W
- Type: Art museum
- Director: Sabine Eckmann
- Public transit access: MetroBus; Blue at Skinker station
- Website: http://kemperartmuseum.wustl.edu

The Mildred Lane Kemper Art Museum is an art museum located on the campus of Washington University in St. Louis, within the university's Sam Fox School of Design & Visual Arts. Founded in 1881 as the St. Louis School and Museum of Fine Arts, it was initially located in downtown St. Louis. It is the oldest art museum west of the Mississippi River. The Museum holds 19th-, 20th-, and 21st-century European and American paintings, sculptures, prints, installations, and photographs. The collection also includes some Egyptian and Greek antiquities and Old Master prints.

The museum moved to its current home, designed by Pritzker Prize-winner Fumihiko Maki, in 2006.

In 2018 the museum was closed for renovation as part of a $360 million campus transformation program at Washington University in St. Louis. One year later, it was reopened with a new 34-foot-tall polished stainless-steel facade, a sculpture garden, and nearly 50 percent more public display space.

== Founding and early years ==
The museum was established in 1881 as part of Washington University in St. Louis, under the name of the St. Louis School and Museum of Fine Arts. Halsey C. Ives was the museum's first director, and during his tenure, the collection focused on contemporary American artists, notably William Merritt Chase.

In 1905, St. Louis banker Charles Parsons donated his private collection to the museum. This collection, which included pieces by Frederic Edwin Church, established the museum as a major holder of contemporary American art.

In 1906, the museum was moved to the Palace of Fine Arts in Forest Park, where it was housed until 1909, at which time its value was formally appraised at $700,000 ($25,100,000 today). In that year, the City Museum of Art was formed, and began to acquire its own artwork funded from a unique civic tax levy, separately from the private university collection. Large parts of the university collection would remain "on loan" to the public museum until 1960.

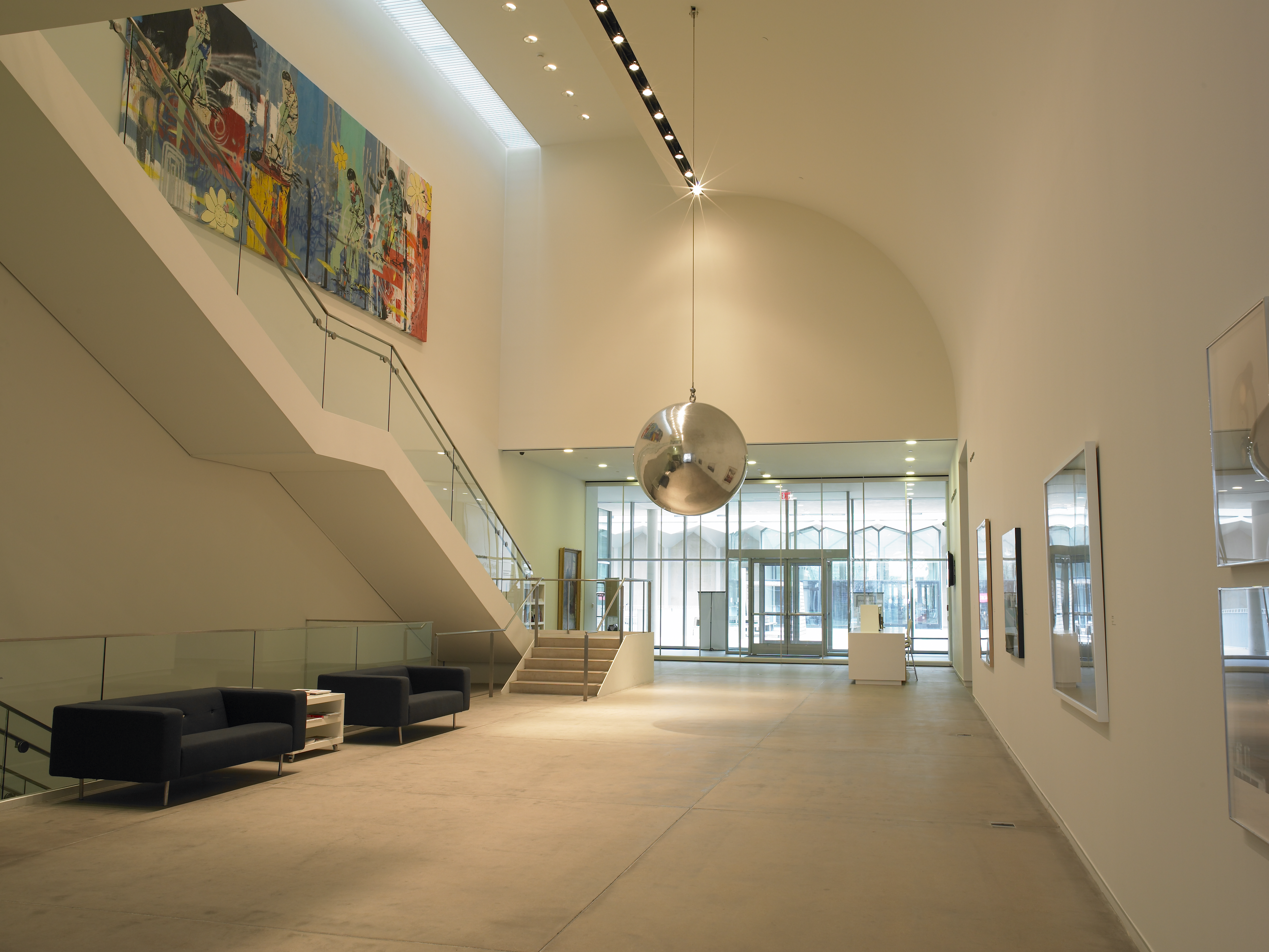
Olafur Eliasson's kinetic sculpture Your Imploded View (2001) on display in the foyer of the Mildred Lane Kemper Art Museum, hanging from a specially reinforced ceiling.

As of the end of 1931, the university's collection of art was extensive, valuable, nameless, and homeless. Its assets included the Charles Parsons collection plus works by Chase, Frederic Remington, Anders Zorn, Rosa Bonheur, and many others. All these were either loaned to the city Art Museum, on display somewhere on campus, shown in Chancellor Throop's home, or stored. The collection's value was estimated at $1,000,000, ranking with those of Harvard, Princeton, and Yale.

== The Janson years ==
In 1941, the Russian-born German-American professor of art history H.W. Janson joined the university as professor in the St. Louis School of Fine Arts, and, as a separate task, guided a renewal of the art collection with a new focus on contemporary European artwork, particularly in acquiring works of Cubism, Expressionism and Surrealism.

Janson's plan to sell popular canvases such as Frederic Remington's A Dash for the Timber at the New York galleries of the Kende family drew comment from the local paper, wondering why St. Louisans had not been given preference. Janson sold 120 artworks, retained 80, and acquired 40 works by European modernists through the Kende Galleries: Paul Klee, Juan Gris, Theo van Doesburg.

Janson also arranged for a permanent home for the museum's collection. He departed in 1948, but in 1960, the museum moved to Steinberg Hall, located on the main university campus. At this time, the museum was also renamed as the Washington University Gallery of Art.

== Recent ==
Recently, the museum has continued to focus on the acquisition of contemporary works, including pieces by Jackson Pollock, Robert Rauschenberg and Jenny Holzer. In 2004, the museum was again renamed, this time as the Mildred Lane Kemper Art Museum, as a division of the new Sam Fox School of Visual Art and Design. Two years later, in 2006, the museum moved to a new building adjacent to the old Steinberg Hall. The 65,000-square-foot (6,000 m^{2}) expansion was designed by Fumihiko Maki, and is also home to the Washington University Art and Architecture library and the department of Art History and Archaeology.

In May 2018, the museum was closed as part of a larger construction project at Washington University. The expansion, on the north side of the Kemper Art Museum, created a new facade composed of 30-foot-tall pleated stainless steel panels. It also included a redesigned entrance and a new 2,700-square-foot exhibition space named the James A. Kemper Gallery. The museum's Florence Steinberg-Weil Sculpture Garden was relocated to a setting north of the Sam Fox School's new Anabeth and John Weil Hall.

In September 2019, the newly expanded and renovated Mildred Lane Kemper Art Museum opened with a major exhibition of work by Ai Weiwei: "Bare Life".

The Kemper Art Museum is currently part of the Sam Fox School of Design & Visual Arts at Washington University, which comprises the College of Art, the College of Architecture, and the Kemper Art Museum. The Sam Fox School was established in 2005 to link strong studio programs in modern art and architecture with the resources and programs of the Museum. Creation of the Sam Fox School follows a nearly $60 million investment in new and renovated art, architecture, and museum facilities. The five-building complex includes two new buildings by Pritzker Prize-winning architect Fumihiko Maki, including the Mildred Lane Kemper Art Museum building.

The Sam Fox School is dedicated to the creation, study, and exhibition of multidisciplinary and collaborative work with an emphasis on fostering creativity and intellectual exchange.

== Exhibits and collection ==
The Mildred Lane Kemper Art Museum has four exhibition spaces: the Barney A. Ebsworth Gallery, Garen Gallery, Bernoudy Permanent Collection Gallery, and teaching gallery. Some exhibitions include To See Without Being Seen: Contemporary Art and Drone Warfare, Rashid Johnson: Message to Our Folks, and Notations: Contemporary Drawing as Idea and Process.

The permanent collection of the museum, exhibited on its top floor and within the Florence Steinberg Weil Sculpture Garden, includes extensive representation by 19th, 20th and 21st Century works.

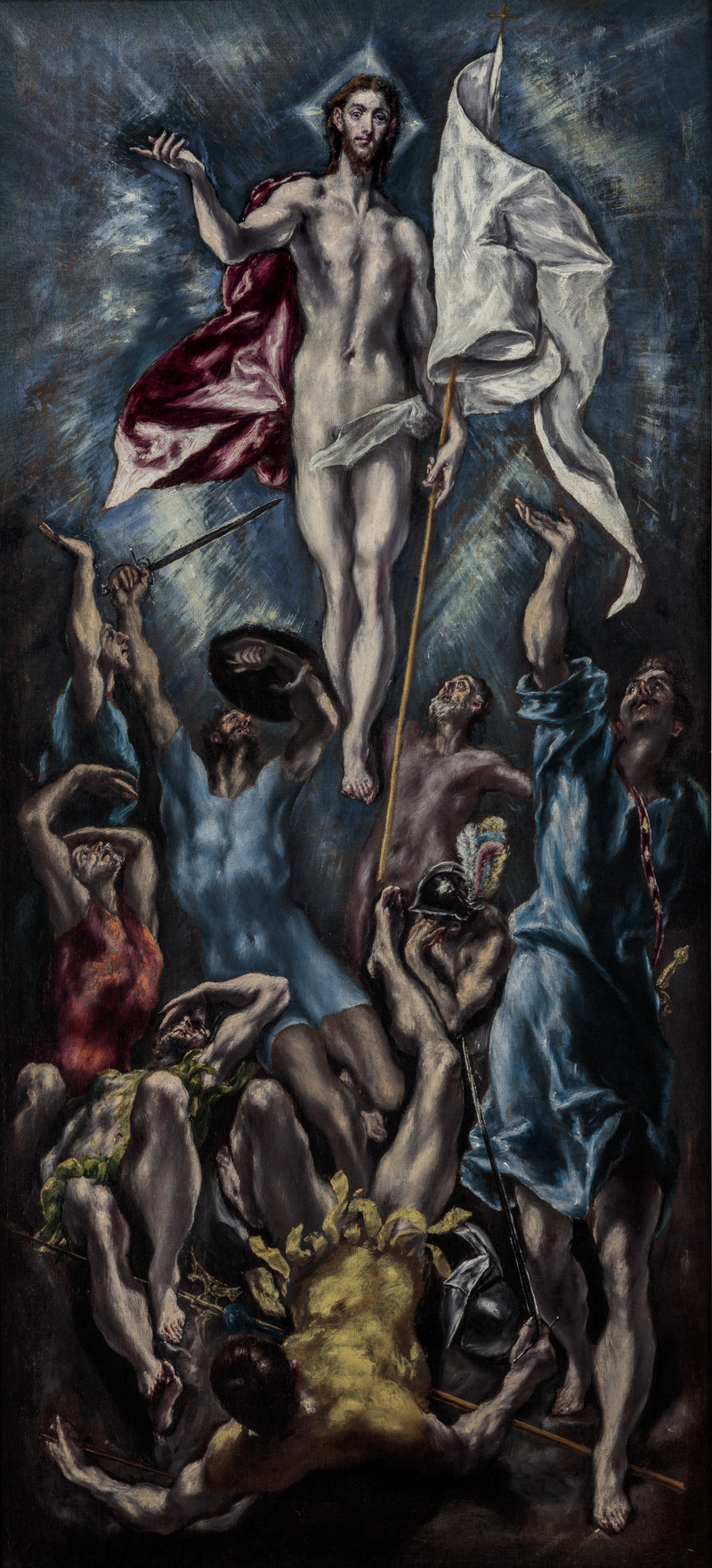
El Greco, Resurrection, 1600–05

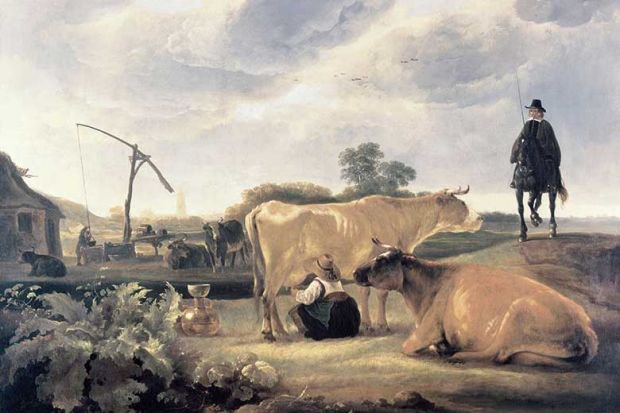
Aelbert Cuyp, Cows with a Milkmaid in a Farmyard, 1650

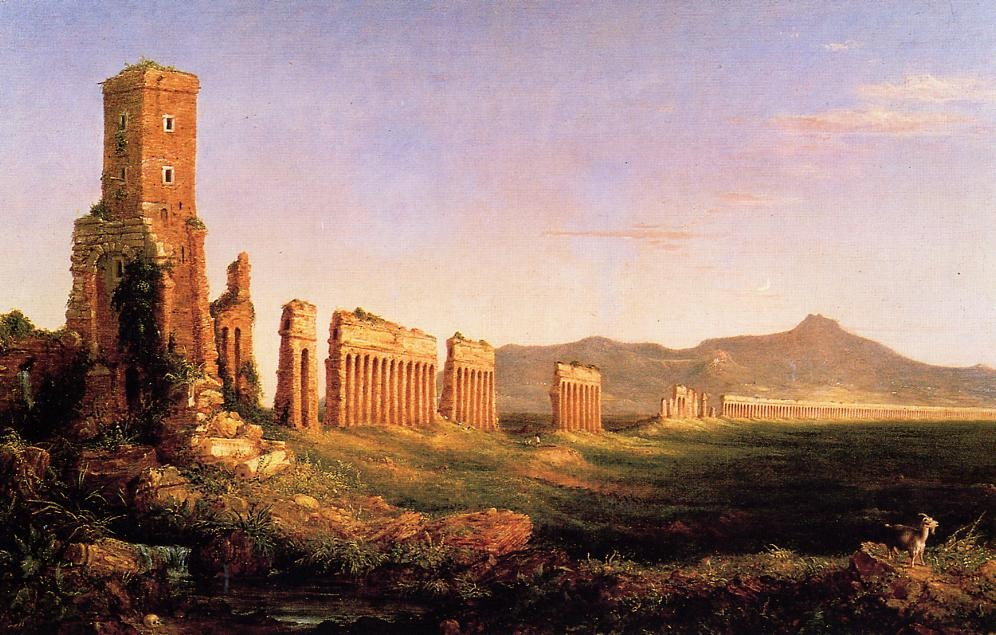
Thomas Cole, Aqueduct near Rome, 1832

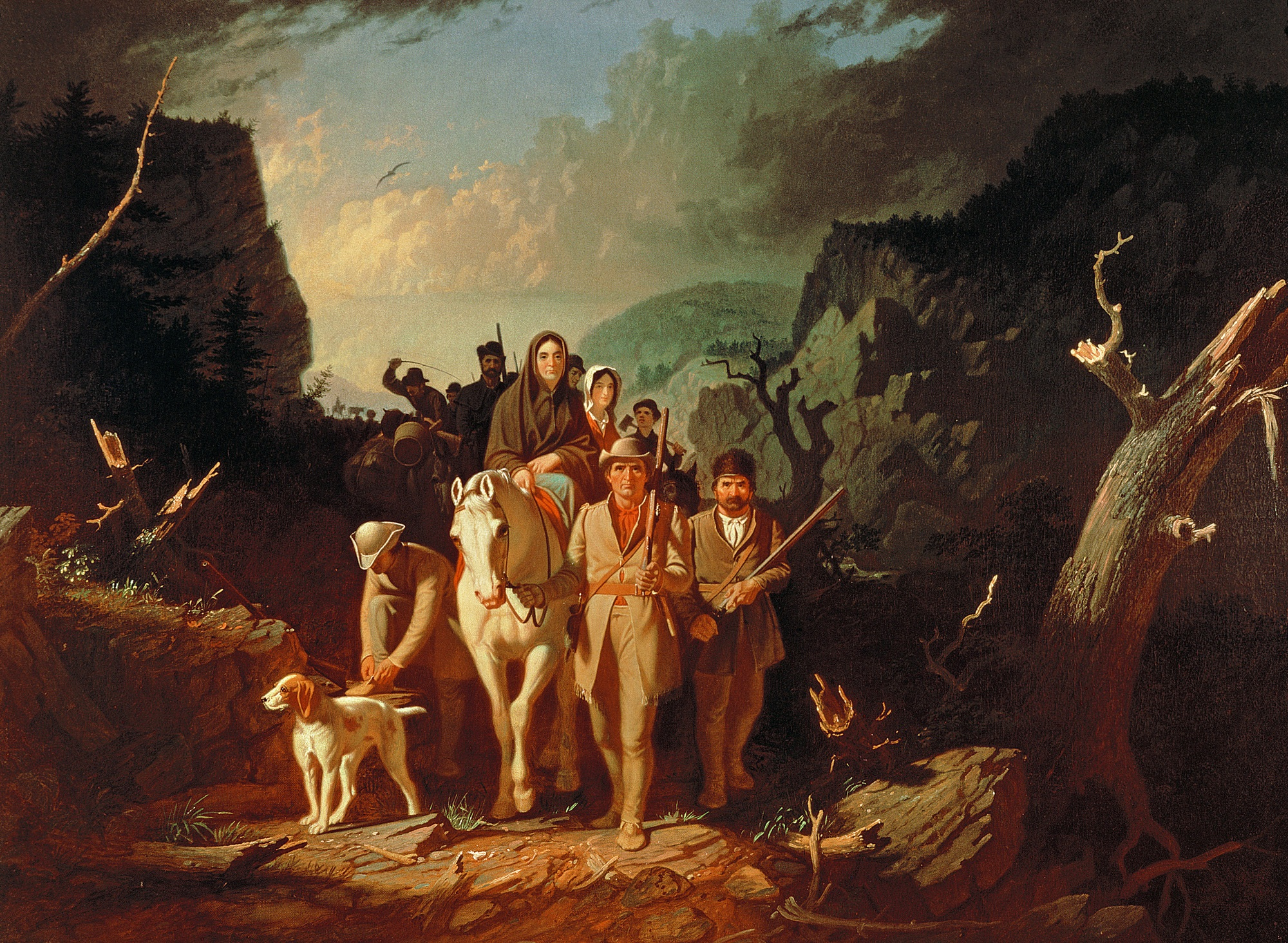
George Caleb Bingham, Daniel Boone Escorting Settlers Through the Cumberland Gap, 1851–52

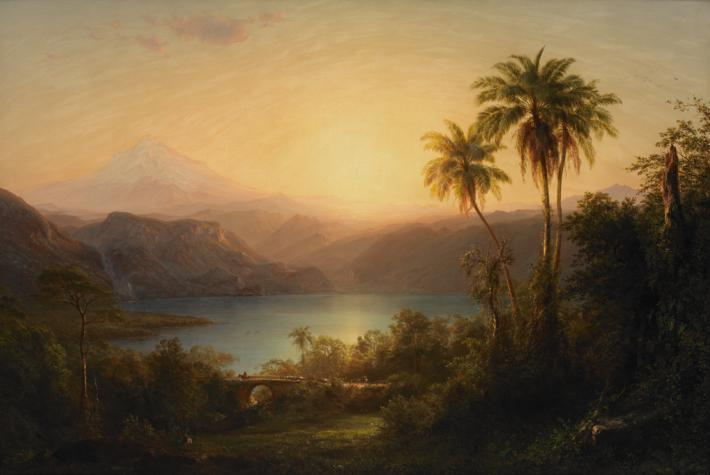
Frederic Edwin Church, Sierra Nevada de Santa Marta, 1883

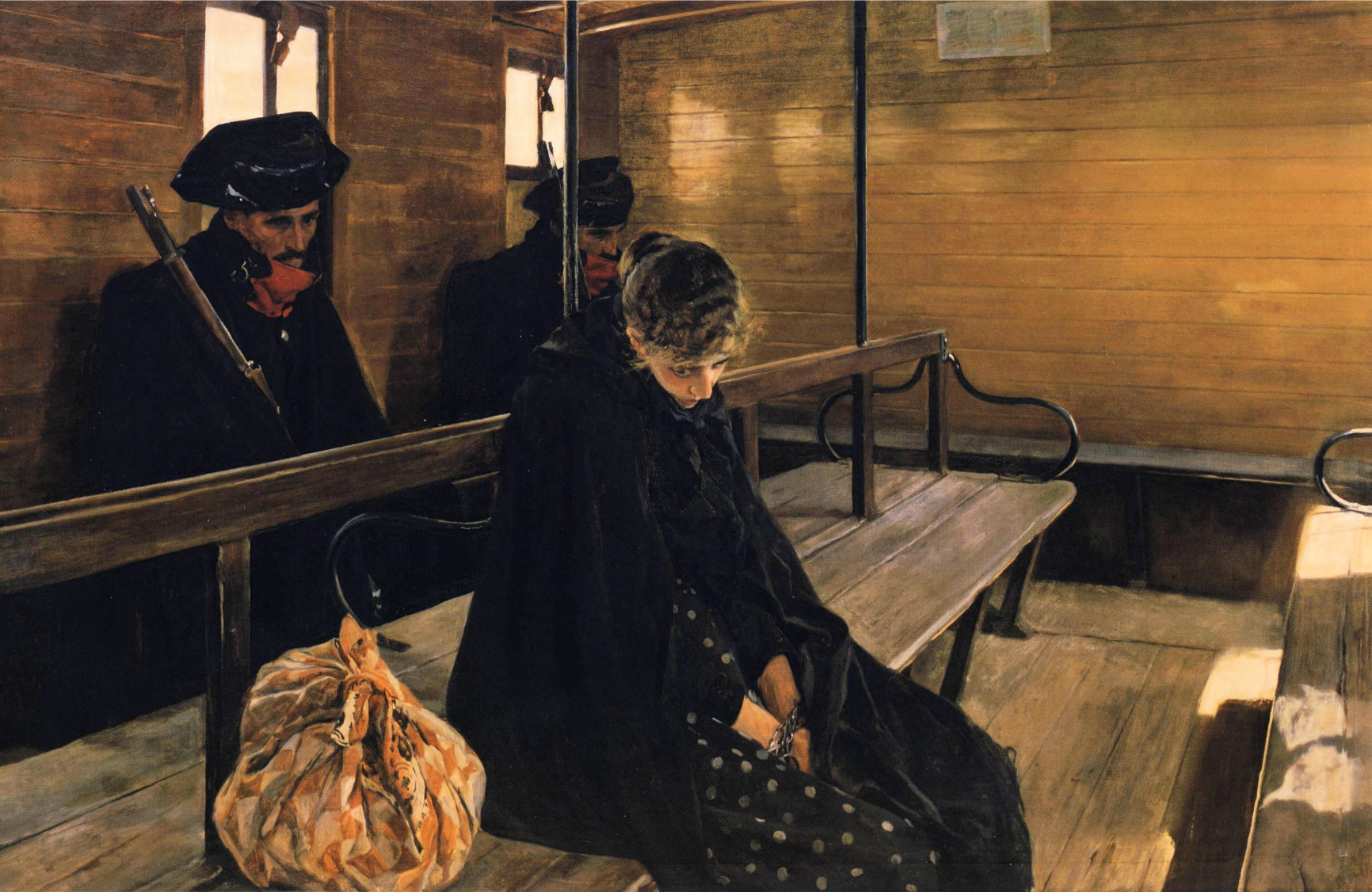
Joaquin Sorolla y Bastida, Another Marguerite!, 1892

Edvard Munch, Portrait of Irmgard Steinbart, 1913

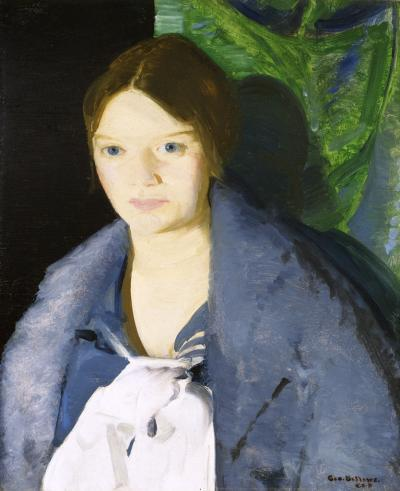
George Bellows, Portrait of Garaldine Lee, No. 1, 1914

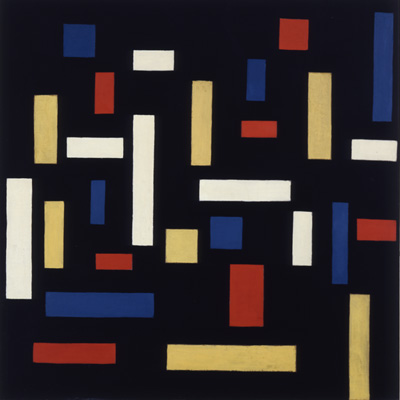
Theo van Doesburg, Composition VII (The Three Graces), 1917

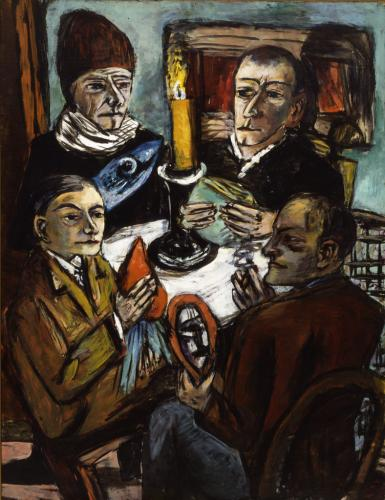
Max Beckmann, Les Artistes mit Gemüse (Artists with Vegetable), 1943

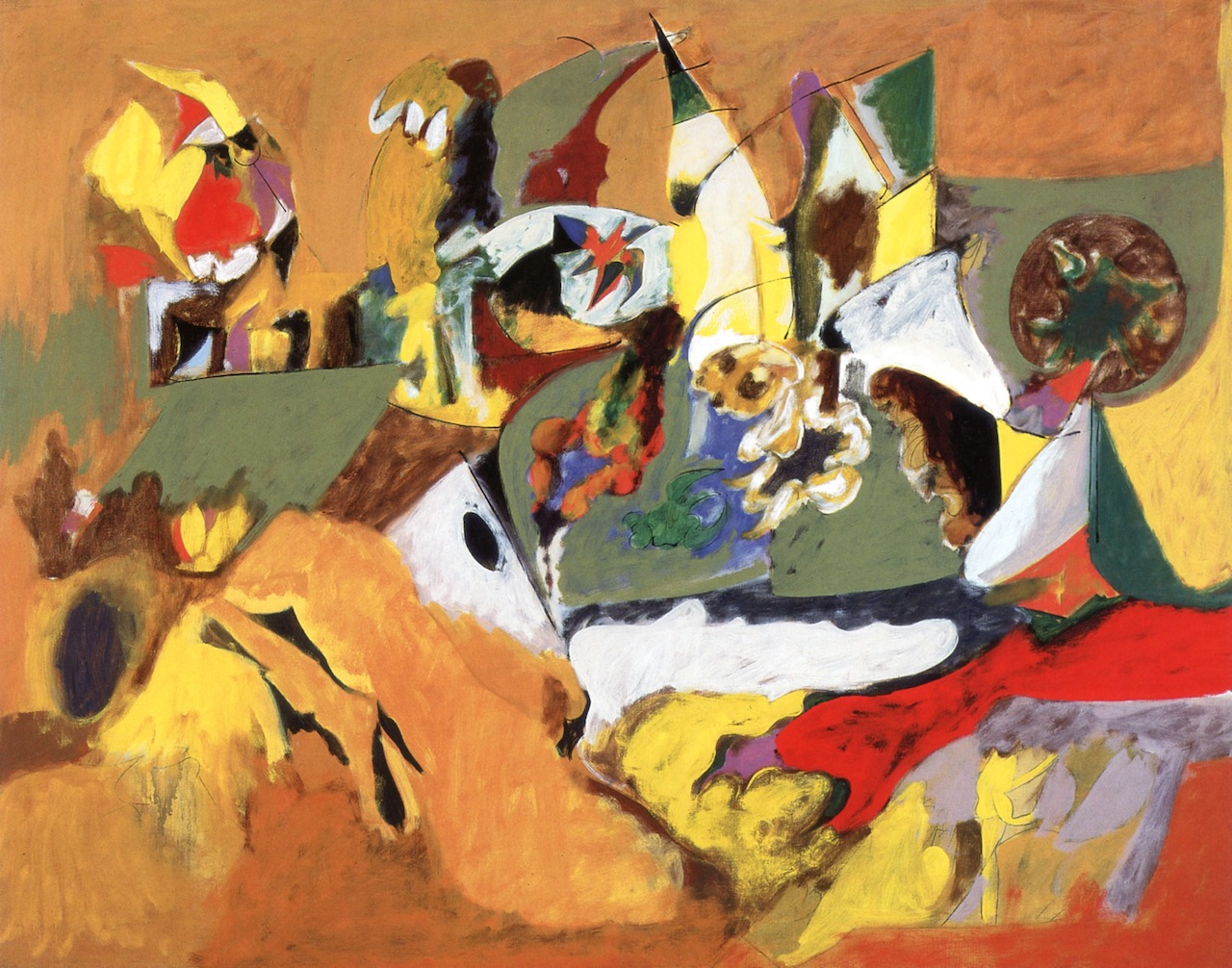
Arshile Gorky, Golden Brown Painting, 1943–44

== Newman Money Museum ==
The Newman Money Museum opened October 25, 2006 on the bottom floor of the Mildred Lane Kemper Art Museum. The museum includes an exhibition space as well as a numismatics library and scholarly work space. The collection was donated by American numismatist Eric P. Newman and his wife Evelyn Newman, containing a broad array of coin and paper money, but primarily focusing on Colonial and early American money. The museum is curated by Tom Serfass and also features items documenting Benjamin Franklin's role as a figure of early American Colonial paper money. Exhibits have also focused on lasting influence of Spanish specie coinage, depiction of women and African-Americans on money, and creation and production of money including sketches, a collection of coin counters and changers, and rare examples of printing errors. The Newman Money Museum closed in 2018 with the expansion of the Kemper Art Museum.
