= Steele Township =

Steele Township may refer to one of the following places:

== Canada ==
- Steele Township, Cochrane District, Ontario (historical)

== In the United States ==
- Steele Township, Conway County, Arkansas
- Steele Township, Daviess County, Indiana
- Steele Township, Rowan County, North Carolina

== See also ==
- Steele (disambiguation)
