= Burdette Johnson =

- Born: January 2, 1885; DeSoto, Missouri
- Died: February 24, 1947 (aged 62); St. Louis, Missouri
- Occupations: Numismatist, coin dealer, shop owner
- Years active: 1900-1947

Burdette Garner Johnson (January 2, 1885 – February 24, 1947) was an American numismatist. A long-time Missouri resident, Johnson was a coin dealer and numismatist based in St. Louis. Johnson was known best for his mentorship of future American numismatists and helped foster the coin collecting interests in the now-renowned numismatist Eric P. Newman.

== Early life ==
Burdette Johnson was born on January 2, 1885, son of William A. Johnson (1849-1931) and Luella Lou Conway Johnson (1859-1914) at DeSoto, Missouri. He and his family moved to St. Louis when he was 12.

Johnson largely educated himself and read a book a day, a routine which he followed through adulthood. At the age of fifteen, Johnson corresponded with the Chapman Brothers coin dealership to buy Roman coins. He later worked for family relatives as a cashier in Columbus, Indiana after finishing elementary school in 1900.

== Early career ==
By September 1902, Johnson left Indiana and returned to St. Louis. He first worked as an employee for Frank Elmer Ellis, the owner of the St. Louis Stamp & Coin coin dealership. Johnson quickly gained prominence among numismatists in the St. Louis area as a specialist in Roman-era coins and joined the American Numismatic Association at the age of eighteen. Johnson earned distinction for his seemingly encyclopedic knowledge and photographic memory despite his young age. By July 7, 1907, Johnson bought half of the St. Louis Stamp & Coin company from Ellis, with his partner and cousin, David Sutherland, owner of the other half. This partnership was short-lived, however, and by September of the next year Johnson bought Sutherland's share of the company and had sole ownership of the store.

== Numismatic career ==
Johnson became one of the most prominent American numismatists of his era. By 1912, Johnson made annual trips to Europe to research, investigate, and collect ancient coins. He was regularly commissioned to appraise the private collections of coin collectors and was known for personally attributing the thousands of coins in his collection. Johnson managed his coin store largely as a wholesaler, selling to other coin dealers.

Johnson also mentored a young Eric Newman. Newman, as a youngster, often ventured into Johnson's store. Johnson notably refused to sell Newman any coins until Newman understood the historical context and attribution of each coin. Johnson fostered many relationships with people who went on to become prominent numismatists, and was well known for his openness and enthusiasm in spreading numismatic interests in others. His collections included large quantities of American colonial coins, ancient and medieval European coins, Mexican coins dating back to Spanish control of the country, and Portuguese Indian pennies.

== Death ==
Johnson died of a heart attack on February 24, 1947, while travelling on a street car to his shop. He was buried in St. Louis County, Missouri.

== Personal life ==
Burdette Johnson was unmarried. During the Great Depression, Johnson took in a young girl named Mary Cruzan who had been abandoned by her parents. He raised and educated her as his own daughter, and Cruzan later inherited the entirety of Johnson's U.S. colonial coin stock. Cruzan's inherited stock was sold at record auction for $1.1 million USD after Cruzan's own death in 1996.
