= Steele (given name) =

Steele is a given name which may refer to:

People

- Steele Bishop (born 1953), Australian former track racing cyclist and world champion
- Steele Chambers (born 2000), American football player
- Steele Hall (1928–2024), Australian politician, 36th Premier of South Australia
- Steele Johnson (born 1996), American diver
- Steele MacKaye (1842–1894), American playwright, actor, theater manager and inventor
- Steele Retchless (born 1971), Australian rugby league footballer
- Steele Rudd, pseudonym of Australian author Arthur Hoey Davis (1868–1935)
- Steele Savage (1900–1970), American illustrator
- Steele Sidebottom (born 1991), Australian rules football player
- Steele Stanwick (born 1989), American collegiate lacrosse player

Mononyms

- el Steele (wrestler)
- Steele (rapper)

Fictional characters

- Steele, the villain in the animated film Balto

== See also ==
- Steele (surname)
- Steele (disambiguation)
