= Stola (disambiguation) =

Stola was the traditional garment of Roman women, corresponding to the toga worn by men.

Stola may also refer to:

- Stola (automotive company), an Italian automotive company founded in 1919
- Štôla, village in Slovakia
- Dariusz Stola, a professor of history at the Institute of Political Studies of the Polish Academy of Sciences

== See also ==
- Stole (disambiguation)
- Stolas (disambiguation)
