= George Steele (disambiguation) =

George Steele (1937–2017) was an American professional wrestler.

George Steele may also refer to:

- George Steele Seymour (1878-1945), American author
- George Gilliam Steele (1798–1855), American architect
- George McKendree Steele (1823–1902), American educator and Methodist minister
- George P. Steele (1924–2018), vice admiral in the United States Navy
- George Washington Steele (1839–1922), American lawyer, soldier, and politician

== See also ==
- George Steel (disambiguation)
