= David Steel (disambiguation) =

David Steel is a British politician.

David Steel may also refer to:

- David Steel (minister) (1910–2002), father of the politician
- Dave Steel, musician with Weddings Parties Anything and solo
- David Steel (Royal Navy officer) (born 1961), British admiral
- David Steel (businessman) (1916–2004), British businessman, chairman of BP, and of the Wellcome Trust
- David Steel, American voice actor

== See also ==
- David Steele (disambiguation)
