= Stolas =

Stolas may refer to:

- Stolas (demon), in the Ars Goetia
- Stolas (band), an American post-hardcore band
- Stolas: Book of Angels Volume 12, a 2009 Masada Quintet album
- Stolas (beetle), a genus of leaf beetles
- Stolas (Helluva Boss), a character based on the Ars Goetia demon, in the animated series Helluva Boss
- Alexander Stølås (born 1989), Norwegian footballer

== See also ==
- Stola (disambiguation)
