= Stol =

Stol may refer to:

- Stol, Babušnica, a village in Serbia
- Golemi Stol, mountain in Serbia
- Stol (Serbian Carpathians), a mountain in Serbia
- Stol (Julian Alps), a mountain in Slovenia
- Stol (Karawanks) (Veliki Stol), a mountain on the border between Austria and Slovenia

== See also ==
- Stole (disambiguation)
- Stoll (disambiguation)
- Stolle, a surname
- STOL (short takeoff and landing), aircraft technology
- STOL (Systems Test and Operations Language), a spacecraft command language
- Stols
