= Eric P. Newman =

American numismatist (1911–2017)

- Newman in 2013
- Born: May 25, 1911; St. Louis, Missouri, U.S.
- Died: November 15, 2017 (aged 106); Clayton, Missouri, U.S.
- Education: Massachusetts Institute of Technology (BS); Washington University in St. Louis (JD)
- Spouse: Evelyn (Edison) Newman (m. 1939; died 2015))
- Children: 2
- Relatives: Ivy Newman Steele (sister)
- Awards: Archer M. Huntington Medal; Medal of the Royal Numismatic Society

Eric Pfeiffer Newman (May 25, 1911 – November 15, 2017) was an American numismatist. He wrote several "works about early American coins and paper money considered the standards on their subjects", as well as hundreds of articles. Newman sold his coins in auctions in 2013–2014 for over $70 million and used most of that money to fund the Newman Numismatic Education Society and its Newman Numismatic Portal to "make the literature and images of numismatics, particularly American numismatics, available to everyone on a free and forever basis."

== Family ==
Newman was born to Samuel Elijah and Rose (Pfeiffer) Newman in St. Louis, Missouri.

== Education and career ==
Newman earned a Bachelor of Science degree from the Massachusetts Institute of Technology (MIT) in 1932 and a Juris Doctor from Washington University School of Law in 1935. He joined a St. Louis law firm that year and practiced law until 1943. The following year, he was hired by Edison Brothers Stores, a retail shoe chain founded by his wife's family. He rose to executive vice president in 1968, before retiring in 1987.

== Numismatics ==
His interest in coins began at the age of seven, when his grandfather gave him an 1859 Indian Head cent. When he was ten years old, he would visit Burdette Johnson's coin store in Downtown St. Louis every couple of weeks; Johnson became his friend and mentor.

While attending MIT, Newman became slightly acquainted with E. H. R. Green, himself a coin collector. Newman and other students were given the use of Green's private radio station at Round Hill, Massachusetts, to follow Rear Admiral Richard E. Byrd's first Antarctic expedition (1928–1930). After Green died in 1936, Newman raised $600 from his family and purchased some currency notes from the estate. After he told Burdette Johnson about it, Johnson put up the money to buy most of Green's collection, including the only five known 1913 Liberty Head nickels. Newman's favorite coin, however, was a unique 1792 pattern in gold that is believed to have been presented to George Washington and carried in his pocket.

In 1938, Newman became vice president of the Missouri Numismatic Society. In 1939, he was appointed Secretary-Treasurer of the Central States Numismatics Society.

In a 1977 article in The Numismatist, Newman shed light on previously unrecognized contributions of Robert Morris, one of the Founding Fathers of the United States and a major financial backer during the American Revolutionary War. According to Newman's New York Times obituary, after the United States gained its independence, the wealthy Morris sustained the government of the young nation during a "grave fiscal crisis" by issuing "vast quantities of notes in denominations from $20 to $100" backed by his own personal credit.

In 2010, he and Robert M. Peck, a curator at the Academy of Natural Sciences of Drexel University in Philadelphia, reported their discovery of an 1824 $3 New Jersey banknote bearing the image of a heath hen. Antiques magazine stated, after conducting research, that this was "almost certainly the earliest published illustration of a bird by John James Audubon."

Newman wrote over 13 numismatic books. He is known for his pioneering study The Early Paper Money of America (1967), which remains the standard work on the subject and has entered its fifth edition. Other written works include The 1776 Continental Currency Coinage: Varieties of the Fugio Cent (1952), The Fantastic 1804 Dollar (1962) and U.S. Coin Scales and Counterfeit Coin Detectors (2000).

== Personal life and legacy ==
Newman married Evelyn Edison on November 29, 1939. They had two children.

The Newmans supported a variety of philanthropic efforts including medical research, academia, and St. Louis cultural affairs. The couple established the Eric P. Newman Numismatic Education Society in 1981. In March 2016, the society launched the Newman Numismatic Portal (NNP), administered through Washington University in St. Louis. The NNP launched with over 100,000 pages worth of over 3,000 documents digitized to both preserve them and make them accessible to a wider range of collectors. In 2003, the Newmans donated two million dollars to Washington University in St. Louis to establish the Newman Money Museum, housed in the Mildred Lane Kemper Art Museum. It opened in 2006 and displayed part of Newman's collection on a rotating basis. They also established the Eric P. Newman Education Center at the Washington University School of Medicine and established numerous professorships and scholarships.

Evelyn Newman died on September 1, 2015, at the age of 95. Eric Newman died on November 15, 2017, at the age of 106.

== Awards and honors ==
Among his many honors are the Archer M. Huntington Medal (the highest award of the American Numismatic Society) in 1978 and the Medal of the Royal Numismatic Society in 1991. The American Numismatic Association inducted him into its Hall of Fame in 1986 and named him Numismatist of the Year in 1996. The American Numismatic Society commissioned a bas-relief portrait that was presented to him at his 100th birthday celebration.

| Year | Award | | Notes |
|---|---|---|---|
| 1955 | ANA, Heath Literary Award | honorable mention | "First Documentary Evidence on the American Colonial Pewter 1/24 Real" |
| 1956 | ANA, Heath Literary Award | 3rd place | "Poor Richard's Mottoes for Coins" |
| 1957 | Missouri Numismatic Society | | "For Outstanding Service to the Missouri Numismatic Society" |
| 1958 | ANA, Heath Literary Award | 3rd place | "Counterfeit Continental Currency Goes to War" |
| 1959 | ANA, Heath Literary Award | 1st place | "The Continental Dollar of 1776 Meets its Maker" |
| 1960 | ANA 25-year Membership Award | | |
| 1962 | ANA, Heath Literary Award | honorary | "Diagnosing the Zerbe 1804 and 1805 Dollars" |
| 1963 | ANA, Heath Literary Award | honorary | "A Dangerous Oak Tree Shilling Copy Appears" |
| 1964 | ANA, Heath Literary Award | 1st place | "Nature of Printing of Colonial and Continental Currency" |
| 1964 | ANA Medal of Merit | | |
| 1965 | Lecturer in Numismatics Award | | Roosevelt University |
| 1965 | ANA, Heath Literary Award | 2nd place | "An Elephant Token Never Forgets — Forgery" |
| 1966 | ANA, Heath Literary Award | 1st place | "Sources of Emblems and Mottoes" |
| 1966 | Western Pennsylvania Numismatic Award | | |
| 1967 | ANA, Heath Literary Award | 4th place | Assay Commission Membership medal |
| 1969 | ANA Farran Zerbe Memorial Award | | |
| 1971 | "Recognition of Contribution to Numismatic Knowledge" | | Oklahoma-Kansas Numismatic Association |
| 1972 | New Orleans ANA Honoris Causa Award | | |
| 1973 | Western Pennsylvania Numismatic Society Award | | bronze medal |
| 1974 | ANA, Heath Literary Award | | certificate of merit |
| 1975 | ANA, Heath Literary Award | 2nd place | "As Phony as a Three Dollar Bill" |
| 1978 | ANS Archer Milton Huntington Award | | |
| 1979 | ANA, Heath Literary Award | 2nd place | "The Philadelphia Highway Coin Fund |
| 1980 | ANA, Heath Literary Award | | "Super Numismatic Forgeries are Upon Us |
| 1982 | Numismatic Literary Guild (NLG) Clemy Award | | "For Numismatic Writing Ability, Sense of Humor, and Dedication to the Hobby" |
| 1984 | ANA, Heath Literary Award | Bronze medal | "Benjamin Franklin and the Chain Design" |
| 1985 | ANA 50 Year Membership Award | | |
| 1989 | ANS Endowment Medal No. 4 | | |
| 1992 | House Joint Resolution No. 271 of the Commonwealth of Virginia | | "Commends Eric P. Newman for his valuable research on Colonial Virginia copper halfpenny and establishing that these were the first authorized legal coinage in Colonial America." |
| 1993 | ANA Exemplary Service Award | | |
| 1996 | ANA Numismatist of the Year | | |
| 1996 | ANS Gold Membership medal for Distinguished Service | | |
| 1997 | ANA Lifetime Achievement Award | | |
| 1999 | C4 Lifetime Achievement Award | | |
| 2001 | Burnett Anderson Memorial Award for Excellence in Numismatic Writing | | ANA, ANS, NLG |
| 2009 | NLG Award of Extraordinary Merit | | "The Fantastic 1804 Dollar: Tribute Edition" |
| 2010 | ANA 75-year membership Award | | |
| 2011 | ANA Wayte and Olga Raymond Memorial Award | 2nd place | "for Distinguished Numismatic Achievement in United States Numismatics |
| 2011 | Rittenhouse Society Gold Medal | | "honoring Newman's numismatic achievements on his 100th birthday" |
| 2011 | ANS plaquette issued in honor of Newman's 100th birthday | | |
| 2013 | PCGS Set Registry Hall of Fame | | |
| 2014 | Society of Paper Money Collectors (SPMC) Hall of Fame | | |
| 2015 | ANA, Heath Literary Award | 1st place | |
| 2015 | Wayte and Olage Raymond Memorial Award | | for Distinguished Achievement in United States Numismatics |
| 2015 | NLG Award | | "for best article in a large non-profit publication for '18th-Century Writings on the Continental Dollar Coin" |
