= Stolen =

Stolen may refer to:

== Films ==
- Stolen (2009 Australian film), a documentary film
- Stolen (2009 American film), a feature film directed by Anders Anderson
- Stolen: The Baby Kahu Story (2010 film), a film based on the real life kidnapping of baby Kahu Durie in New Zealand.
- Stolen (2012 film), a film by Simon West, starring Nicolas Cage
- Stolen (2023 film), a Hindi-language thriller film
- Stolen (2024 film), a Swedish film by Elle Márjá Eira

== Books ==
- Stolen (Armstrong novel), a 2003 novel by Kelley Armstrong
- Stolen (Christopher novel), a 2009 novel by Lucy Christopher

== Music ==
- STOLEN, Chinese rock band
- "Stolen" (Dashboard Confessional song), 2006
- "Stolen" (Jay Sean song), 2004

== Other uses ==
- Stolen!, a 2016 mobile app
- "Stolen" (Agents of S.H.I.E.L.D.), a 2020 television episode
- "Stolen" (Not Going Out), a 2018 television episode
- Stolen (play), a 1998 Australian play by Jane Harrison
- Stolen (podcast), an investigative journalism podcast
- Stolen (video game), a 2005 stealth-based video game

== See also ==
- Stole (disambiguation)
- Stolin, a town in Belarus
- Stollen, a German Christmas cake
- Theft
