= Steal =

Steal, Stealer or Stealing may refer to:

- Theft, the illegal act of taking another person's property without that person's freely-given consent
- The gaining of a stolen base in baseball
  - the 2004 ALCS stolen base in Game Four, see Dave Roberts (outfielder)
- Steal (basketball), a situation when a defensive player actively takes possession of the ball from an offensive player
- Steal (curling), score/win by a team that did not throw the last rock
- Steal (film), a 2002 action film
- Steal (2026 TV series), a British crime thriller first released in 2026
- Steal (game show), a British game show produced by Central Television that aired on ITV in 1990
- Steal (poker), a type of a bluff
- The Steal, the British melodic hardcore punk band
  - The Steal (album), a 2006 album by The Steal
- The Steal (film), a 1995 British comedy thriller film
- a discount
- Steal, a gameplay element in the reality franchise series The Voice
- "Steal" (song), a 2014 song by Spandau Ballet
- Stealer: The Treasure Keeper, a 2023 South Korean television series
- "Stealing" (Ty Dolla Sign song), a 2016 song from the mixtape Campaign.

== See also ==
- Stole (disambiguation)
- Stolen (disambiguation)
