= George Steel =

George Steel may refer to:

- George Steel (Canadian politician) (1858–1940), provincial legislator in Manitoba, Canada
- George Steel (musician), music director and conductor in New York City, U.S.
- George A. Steel (Oregon politician) (1846–1918), politician in Oregon, U.S.
- George A. Steel (Michigan politician) (1862–1935), State Treasurer of Michigan
- George B. Steel (1835–1916), American politician in the Virginia House of Delegates

== See also ==
- George Steele (disambiguation)
