= John Steel =

John Steel may refer to:

- John Steel (tailor), Scottish servant of King James IV
- John Steel (Canadian politician) (1737–1826), politician in Lower Canada
- John Steel (drummer) (born 1941), original drummer of the band The Animals
- John Steel (footballer, born 1895) (1895–1953), Scottish footballer (Queen's Park, Nelson)
- John Steel (footballer, born 1902) (1902–1976), Scottish footballer (Hamilton Academical, Burnley)
- John Steel (MP) (1786–1868), British MP for Cockermouth (1854–1857)
- John Steel (singer) (1895–1971), American tenor
- John Steel (swimmer) (born 1972), New Zealand Olympic swimmer
- John Miles Steel (1877–1965), first Commander-in-Chief of the RAF's Bomber Command
- John R. Steel (born 1948), American mathematician at University of California, Berkeley
- Leslie White, who wrote as "John Steel" for newspaper of Socialist Labor Party of America

== See also ==
- Jon Steel (born 1980), Scottish rugby league player
- Sir John Steell or Steel (1804–1891), Scottish sculptor
- John Steele (disambiguation)
- The John Steel Singers
