= Ivy Newman Steele =

American artist (1908–1974)

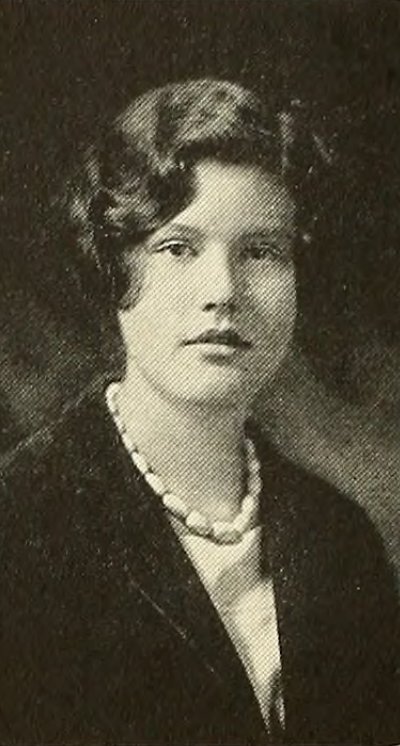
- Ivy Newman, from the 1929 yearbook of Wellesley College
- Born: Ivy Joy Newman; April 15, 1908; St. Louis, Missouri, U.S.
- Died: December 7, 1974 (aged 66); Chicago, Illinois, U.S.
- Occupations: Artist, sculptor, lithographer, art educator
- Relatives: Eric P. Newman (brother); Evelyn (Edison) Newman (sister-in-law)

Ivy Joy Newman Steele (April 15, 1908 – December 7, 1974) was an American artist based in the Chicago area, best known for her sculptures and lithographs.

== Early life and education ==
Newman was born in St. Louis, Missouri, the daughter of Samuel Elijah Newman and Rose Pfeiffer Newman. Her father was a surgeon. She graduated from Wellesley College in 1929, with further studies at the Art Institute of Chicago and with artists Todros Geller and Cosmo Campoli. Her younger brother Eric P. Newman became a noted numismatist.

== Career ==
Steele exhibited her works, usually lithographs and sculpture, from the 1930s into the 1960s. She taught art in Chicago, at the Frances W. Parker School in the 1940s and at Hull House from 1945 to 1954, and at Michael Reese Hospital in the 1960s. She was a member of the Chicago Society of Artists and the Renaissance Society. She completed several commissions for public sculpture in Evanston and Highland Park.

== Personal life ==
Newman married businessman Henry Bernard Steele Jr. in 1930. They had two children. Her husband died in 1970, and she died in 1974, at the age of 66, in Chicago. Works by Steele are in the collections of Syracuse University, and the Davis Museum at Wellesley College.
