= James Steel =

James, Jim or Jimmy Steel may refer to:

- Sir James Steel (1830–1904), Lord Provost of Edinburgh
- James Steel, a character from the TV series Law & Order: UK
- Jim Steel (director) (1958–2014), American director, writer and producer of adult films
- Jim Steel (footballer) (born 1959), Scottish footballer

== See also ==
- James Steele (disambiguation)
