= Stolle =

Stolle is a surname. Notable people with the surname include:

- Bruno Stolle (1915–2004), German pilot
- Chris Stolle (born 1958), American politician
- Fred Stolle (1938–2025), Australian tennis player
- Gerhard Stolle (born 1952), German athlete
- Hellmut W. Stolle (1905–1977), German-born American politician
- Ken Stolle (born 1954), American politician
- Michael Stolle (born 1974), German athlete
- Philipp Stolle (1614–1675), German composer
- Sandon Stolle (born 1970), Australian tennis player
- Colin Stolle (born 1970), American politician

== See also ==
- Stollé synthesis, a chemical reaction for the formation of oxindoles by combining anilines and α-haloacid chlorides (or oxalyl chloride)
- Stol (disambiguation)
- Stole (disambiguation)
- Stoll (disambiguation)
- Stollen, a type of cake
