= Judge Steel =

Judge Steel may refer to:

- Edwin DeHaven Steel Jr. (1904–1986), judge of the United States District Court for the District of Delaware
- William H. Steele (judge) (born 1951), judge of the United States District Court for the Southern District of Alabama

== See also ==
- John E. Steele (1949–2026), judge of the United States District Court for the Middle District of Florida
- Justice Steele (disambiguation)
