= Steele Lake (disambiguation) =

Steele Lake, Lake Steele, or lakes named Steele, may refer to:

- Steele Lake, Alberta, Canada; a lake in Cross Lake Provincial Park
- Steele Lake (Wisconsin), USA; a lake in Douglas County
- Steele Lake, East Humboldt Range, Nevada, USA; a lake in Elko County
- Steele Lake, Minnesota. USA; a lake in Le Sueur County, Minnesota

== See also ==
- Steel Lake (disambiguation)
- Steele (disambiguation)
- Lake (disambiguation)
