= Steel Lake =

Steel Lake or Lake Steel or lakes named Steel, may refer to:

== Places ==
- Steel Lake (Washington), Washington State, United States; a lake in King County
  - Steel Lake Park, Federal Way, King County, Washington, United States; a park on the southern shore of Steel Lake in the city of Federal Way
  - Steel Lake Annex, Federal Way, King County, Washington, United States; a subdivision in the city of Federal Way located south of Steel Lake (Washington)
- Steel Lake (Ontario), Canada; a lake in Thunder Bay District

== Groups, companies, organizations ==
- Steel Lake Inc., the TLD registrar for ".clothing"; see List of Internet top-level domains
- Lake Steel Inc., a steel company owned by Kel Seliger

== Arts, entertainment, media ==
- "Steel Lake" (episode), a 1975 TV episode of The Magic of Oil Painting
- 'Steel Lake' (story), a 2011 short story by Jack Skillingstead

== Other uses ==
- Steel Lake Shooting (July 27, 2020), Federal Way, Washington, United States; see List of mass shootings in the United States in 2020

== See also ==
- Steele Lake (disambiguation)
- Steel (disambiguation)
- Lake (disambiguation)
