= Steel (comics) =

Steel, in comics, may refer to one of several DC Comics characters:

- Commander Steel, a World War II hero and his grandsons, also known as simply "Steel" and "Citizen Steel".
- John Henry Irons, an armored hero inspired by Superman and the folk hero John Henry
- Natasha Irons, the niece of John Henry Irons, also known as "Starlight" and "Vaporlock".

== See also ==
- Steel (disambiguation)
