= Tim Steele =

Tim Steele may refer to:

- Tim Steele (footballer) (born 1967), English professional footballer
- Tim Steele (racing driver) (1968–2024), American race car driver in the ARCA Re/MAX Series

== See also ==
- Timothy Steele (born 1948), American poet
