= Jason Steele =

Jason Steele may refer to:

- Jason Steele (politician) (born 1948), American politician
- Jason Steele (footballer) (born 1990), English goalkeeper
- Jason Steele (wrestler), wrestler and bodybuilder
- Jason Steele (animator), American animator, voice actor, and filmmaker
