= Senator Steele =

Senator Steel or Steele may refer to:

- Brent Steele (born 1947), Indiana State Senate
- Calvin F. Steele (1842–1910), Nebraska State Senate
- Charles Steele Jr. (born 1946), Alabama State Senate
- Charles W. Steele (1858–1943), Virginia State Senate
- Elijah Steele (1817–1883), Wisconsin State Senate
- George A. Steel (Michigan politician) (1862–?), Michigan State Senate
- George A. Steel (Oregon politician) (1846–1918), Oregon State Senate
- R. B. Steele (1879/80–1966), Nebraska State Senate
- Tracy Steele (born 1963), Arkansas State Senate
- Victoria Steele (fl. 2010s), Arizona State Senate
- Walter Leak Steele (1823–1891), North Carolina State Senate

== See also ==
- Sarah Steelman (born 1958), Missouri State Senate
