= Steele, Arkansas =

- Unincorporated community
- Steele's position in Arkansas Steele, Arkansas (the United States)
- Coordinates: 36°08′37″N 94°14′21″W
- Country: United States
- State: Arkansas
- County: Washington
- Township: Tontitown
- Elevation: 1,191 ft (363 m)
- Time zone: UTC-6 (Central (CST))
  - Summer (DST): UTC-5 (CDT)
- ZIP code: 72762
- Area code: 479
- GNIS feature ID: 81632

Steele is an unincorporated community in Tontitown Township, Washington County, Arkansas, United States. It is located at the intersection of Barrington Road and Arbor Acres Road in Tontitown.
