= Ryan Steele =

Ryan Steele may refer to:

- Ryan Steele (comedian), one-half of the duo The Ryan and Amy Show
- Ryan Steele (actor), American dancer and actor
- Ryan Steele, a VR Troopers character
