= Justice Steele =

Justice Steele may refer to:

- Benjamin H. Steele (1837–1873), associate justice of the Vermont Supreme Court
- Myron T. Steele (born 1945), associate justice and chief justice of the Delaware Supreme Court
- Robert W. Steele (1857–1910), chief justice of the Colorado Supreme Court

== See also ==
- Steele Justice, 1987 film
- Judge Steel (disambiguation)
