= Stole =

Stole may refer to:

== Clothing ==
- Stole (shawl), a type of shawl, particularly one made of fur
- Stole (vestment), a Christian liturgical garment
- Academic stole, a garment worn at formal academic events such as graduation

== People ==
- Stojan Stole Aranđelović (1930–1993), Serbian film actor
- Stole Dimitrievski (born 1993), Macedonian footballer
- Stole Janković (1925–1987), Serbian film director and screenwriter
- Stole Popov (born 1950), Macedonian film director
- Ole Bjørn Støle (1950–2010), Norwegian Supreme Court justice and lawyer
- Svein Støle (born 1963), Norwegian businessperson and former journalist

== Other uses ==
- "Stole" (song), a 2002 song by American singer Kelly Rowland

== See also ==
- Stol (disambiguation)
- Stola (disambiguation)
- Stolen (disambiguation)
- Stoll (disambiguation)
- Stolle, a surname
