= Steele Butte =

Summit in Utah, United States

Coordinates: 38°04′29″N 110°55′17″W

Steele Butte is a summit in Garfield County, Utah, United States, with an elevation of 6,873 feet (2,095 m).

Steele Butte was named for Pete Steele, a pioneer settler.
