= Thomas Steele =

Thomas or Tom Steele may refer to:

- Thomas Steele (Australian politician) (1887–1963), member of the New South Wales Legislative Council
- Thomas Steele (British politician) (1753–1823), English Member of Parliament
- Thomas Steele (VC) (1891–1978), English recipient of the Victoria Cross
- Thomas J. Steele (1853–1920), American politician, U.S. Representative from Iowa
- Thomas Montagu Steele (1820–1890), British army officer
- Tom Steele (politician) (1905–1979), Scottish Labour politician
- Tom Steele (stuntman) (1909–1990), American stuntman and actor
- Tommy Steele (born 1936), English entertainer

== See also ==
- Tommy Steel, soccer goalkeeper
- Tom Steels, Belgian cyclist
