= Jon Stoll =

Business executive (1953–2008)

- Born: Jonathan Edward Stoll; November 6, 1953; Mamaroneck, New York, U.S.
- Died: January 12, 2008 (aged 54); West Palm Beach, Florida, U.S.
- Education: Bryant College
- Occupations: Concert promoter, businessman
- Known for: Founder and president of Fantasma Productions

Jonathan Edward "John" Stoll (November 6, 1953 - January 12, 2008) was an American concert promoter and the founder and president of Fantasma Productions, which was the worlds largest independent live event and concert promotion company sold to Live Nation. The company was based in West Palm Beach, Florida.

== Early life ==
Jon Stoll was born on November 6, 1953, in Mamaroneck, New York. He was raised in Mamaroneck and completed his secondary education at Mamaroneck High School. He later attended Bryant College (now Bryant University) in Smithfield, Rhode Island, during which time he began promoting concerts. His early interest in live events reportedly began in high school, when he organized rock‑concert style events for fellow students

As a 15-year-old student at Mamaroneck High School, Stoll raised money for the school through a battle of the bands. He gained experience working backstage at theaters around New York, and at age 18, he managed a rock band. While attending Bryant College in Smithfield, Rhode Island, he continued to run stage shows. After he and his parents moved to Fort Lauderdale, Florida, he started promoting concerts at South Florida drive-in theaters. He sold tickets to concerts or movies for $3–4 each, drawing in 6,000 to 10,000 people.

== Fantasma Productions ==
In 1970, Stoll founded Fantasma Productions in mamaroneck ny. By 1987, Fantasma grew to 50 employees, booking and managing more than 500 concerts a year. Fantasma Productions expanded to Miami and Fort Lauderdale, then throughout Florida, the Southeast, and other major venues, including in Las Vegas. Fantasma was responsible for booking acts for SunFest, Mizner Park in Boca Raton, and the Seminole Hard Rock Hotel and Casino Hollywood. Stoll purchased the Carefree Theatre in West Palm Beach, converting parts of the building into a retail art gallery, sports bar, bistro, and comedy club known as the Comedy Corner. The theater also hosted the Palm Beach Film Festival and the South Florida Jewish Film Festival every year. In 1990, the theatre began showing foreign and art films. After hurricanes in 2005 damaged the Carefree Theatre beyond repair, Stoll purchased an abandoned church just north of Southern Boulevard off Parker Avenue, and created The Theatre, another small concert hall.

According to The Hollywood Reporter, by the mid-1990s, Stoll was one of a small number of independent promoters who resisted buyout offers by larger corporations, arguing that the result would hurt business and artists. "I just think it's unfortunate that there are less options for artists," he told The New York Times in 2006. "If you have no options, then you have to deal with one buyer – and whatever they decide to pay you." In 2000, he was named Independent Promoter of the Year at the 12th Annual Pollstar Awards in Las Vegas, and in 2007 he served as president of the National Association of Concert Promoters. In late 2007, Stoll had a stroke that required surgery. On January 12, 2008, at the age of 54, Stoll died of complications from brain cancer. He is survived by his wife Lori and children Liana, Jack, LJ, Jesse and Lauren.

== General references ==
- Carlos Coto, Juan. "Fantasma's Jon Stoll Keeping Pace With The New Beat". Article Collections. Sun Sentinel. Archived from the original on August 13, 2012.
- "FANTASMA FOUNDER JON STOLL PASSES AWAY". Trash Menagerie.
- "Industry Profile: Jon Stoll". Industry Profiles. Celebrity Access.
- Lefsetz, Bob (14 January 2008). "So Little Time To Fly". The Lefsetz Letter. Bob Lefsetz.
- Passy, Charles. "Jon Stoll: Larger than life". Accent Section. Palm Beach post. Archived from the original on January 22, 2008.
