= Dr. Steel (disambiguation) =

Dr. Steel may refer to:

== Fictional characters ==
- Doctor Steel, a steampunk musician
- Dr. Steel, a character in the Big Jim action figure series
- Doctor Steel, a French comic series from Soleil Productions, being written by Jerry Frissen and drawn by Sean 'Cheeks' Galloway

== Scientists ==
- Duncan G. Steel (born 1951), an American experimental physicist
- Duncan I. Steel (born 1955), an English astrophysicist
- Mike Steel (mathematician), New Zealand mathematician
