= George McKendree Steele =

American politician

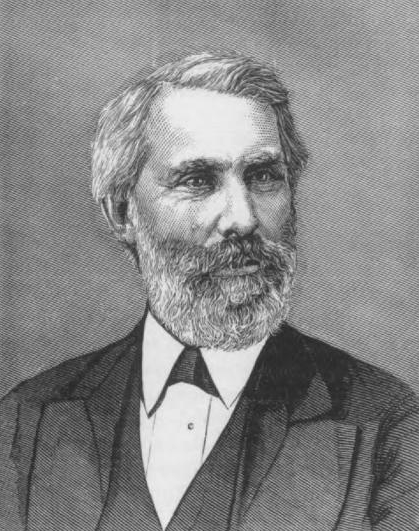
- Born: April 13, 1823; Strafford, Vermont
- Died: January 14, 1902 (aged 78); Kenilworth, Illinois
- Education: Wesleyan University
- Occupations: Educator, clergyman, politician
- Political party: Greenback
- Spouse: Susan J. Swift (m. 1852; died 1895)

The Rev. Dr. George McKendree Steele, D.D., LL.D. (April 13, 1823 – January 14, 1902) was an American educator and Methodist minister, president of Lawrence University in Appleton, Wisconsin from 1865 to 1879. He was the author of the 1876 pamphlet The Currency Question – regarded as a major statement of the philosophy of the Greenback movement – and was a Greenback Party nominee for Congress and other public office.

== Biography ==
Steele was born in Strafford, Vermont on April 13, 1823, one of seven children of Joel Steele (a Methodist minister) and Jerusha (Higgins) Steele. He spent his youth on a farm in his native town, with little formal schooling; but was able to attend Newbury Seminary. Afterwards he taught briefly and then entered the Wesleyan University, from which he graduated in 1850.

He spent three years thereafter (1850–1853) as a teacher of Latin and mathematics at Wilbraham Wesleyan Academy in Wilbraham, Massachusetts, and married Susan J. Swift on July 1, 1852.

In 1892, Steele and his wife moved to Auburndale, Massachusetts, when he accepted a professorship at Lasell Seminary (now Lasell University).

He died in Kenilworth, Illinois in 1902.
