= James Steele =

James Steele may refer to:

- James Steele (British Army officer) (1894–1975), British general
- James Steele (United States Army officer), US special forces veteran
- James B. Steele (born 1943), American investigative journalist and author
- James Harlan Steele (1913–2013), American veterinarian
- Jim Steele (footballer) (born 1950), Scottish footballer who also played for Southampton
- Jim Steele (wrestler) (born 1967), American professional wrestler
- Jimmy Steele (American football) (1909–1980), University of Florida football player
- Jimmy Steele (dentist) (1962–2017), British dentist
- Jimmy Steele (republican) (1907–1970), Irish republican and Irish Republican Army (IRA) member

== See also ==
- James Steel (disambiguation)
