= Mary E. Steele =

Traveller and natural history collector (1880–1974)

Mary E Steele
- Born: 13 April 1880; Great Parndon
- Died: 10 November 1974 (aged 94); Earl's Court
- Occupations: Artist photographer entomological collector botanical collector traveller
- Years active: 1904–1964

Mary E. Steele (1880–1974) was a British artist, photographer, and collector of entomological and botanical specimens. Steele travelled and collected widely in Africa and Asia, and had a long standing connection with the Natural History Museum, London.

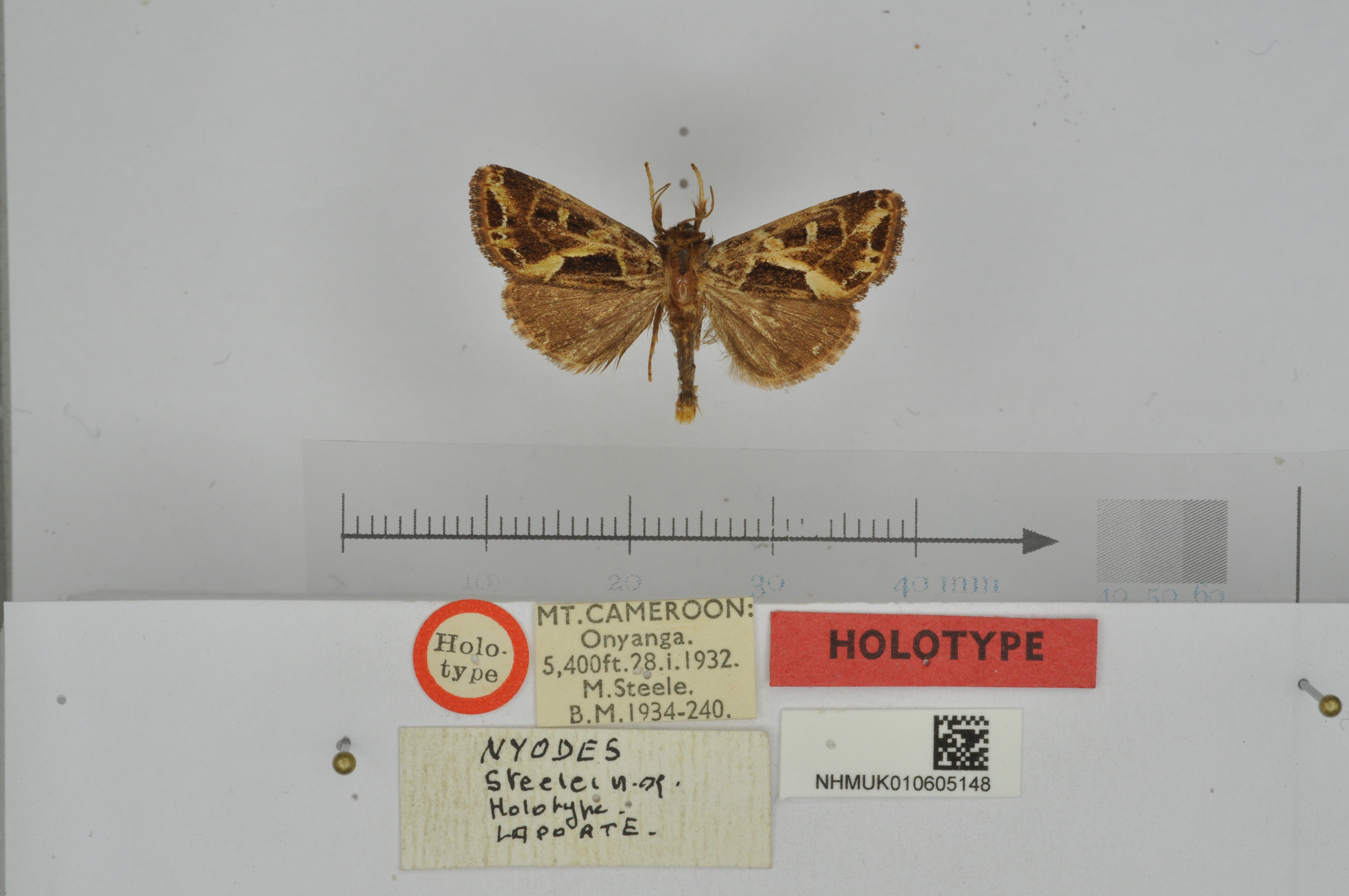
Holotype specimen of the noctuid moth species Nyodes steelei Laporte, 1971, collected in 1932 at Mount Cameroon by Mary Steele (NHMUK010605148)

== Early life ==
Steele was born on 13 April 1880 at a house named Northfields at Great Parndon, Harlow to Adam Rivers Steele (a solicitor, 1843–1928) and Eleanor (née Robinson, 1843–1910), who had married at Mirfield, Yorkshire, in 1873. Adam Rivers Steele was a solicitor, and Eleanor's father Charles was a surgeon. Mary Steele had five siblings: Major Adam Rivers Steele (1876–1932), Eleanor (1876–1937), Camilla (1878–1946), John (1882–1949) and Charles (b. 1883). The early education of the Steele children was via a live-in German governess named Hermine Meyer.

The financial circumstances of the Steele family changed considerably in 1900 when Mrs Eleanor Steele's cousin once-removed, Charles Wheatley (1813–1900), died and bequeathed Eleanor and her children an estate worth around £400,000 [= roughly £41 million in value as of February 2025]. In 1902 the Steele family moved from Great Parndon to Loddington Hall at Kettering, Northamptonshire, a manor house originally built in the 1300s.

Loddington Hall was reputedly haunted. A former worker at Loddington hall, Marge Arniell, recalled that her mother in law (who had been a maid working in the house during the Steele family's residence) once sought night-time refuge with the Steele sisters after an apparent encounter with the Red Lady, Loddington Hall's resident ghost.

Mary Steele's earliest recorded contact with the British Museum was in 1904: Steele had given a fossil Echinoderm to Mr C H Read, who passed the fossil on to Francis Arthur Bather at the BM. Bather identified the fossil as Pygaster semisulcatus from a novel locality and wrote to Steele to ask "whether you feel at all inclined to part with it to the national collection." Later in her life Steele would become a regular and prolific donor of specimens to the Museum.

Steele's mother Eleanor died in 1910 and Mary and her sisters continued to live with their father and support him. In 1918 one of the Steele sisters – a newspaper report refers to her simply as 'Miss Steele', so based upon contemporary etiquette probably the eldest – helped to apprehend two escaped German Prisoners of War while out exercising with her horse near Loddington village.

== Steele's travels and collecting ==
=== 1920s ===
1923–1924: Mary Steele accompanied the Thomas Alexander Barns Expedition to the Congo and Angola as an artist, the other main Expedition participants being Barns himself, Barns's wife Margery, Alfred Collins of the Geographical Society of Philadelphia, and hunter Paul Renaud, who accompanied the expedition as an assistant collector. Steele was described in a contemporary newspaper report as 'a Northampton girl.' The expedition had financial support from James John Joicey.

At the time of departing England, Steele gave her address as number 22 Barkston Gardens, north west London, a property that had previously belonged to the actress Ellen Terry. Steele travelled with Thomas and Margery Barns from London towards Dar es Salaam on the Union Castle steamship Norman. Thomas Barns' account of the expedition details how the two women and some other expedition members were left at Irumu, Ituri Province while he and Renaud went hunting. Steele and Margery Barns were left to their own devices for about two months, with Margery noting that she disliked hunting and was not a good shot, but that they walked about 15 miles a day. Steele eventually continued her travels alone across what was then the British Protectorate of Uganda.

1925: Steele returned to the Congo in 1925, donating a series of photographs she had taken on this trip to the collection of the Royal Geographical Society. Also in 1925 Steele travelled to Sudan and Abyssinia [Ethiopia], once more donating photographs from her journey to the Royal Geographical Society.

On 23 November 1925, Steele was elected a Member of the Royal Geographical Society.

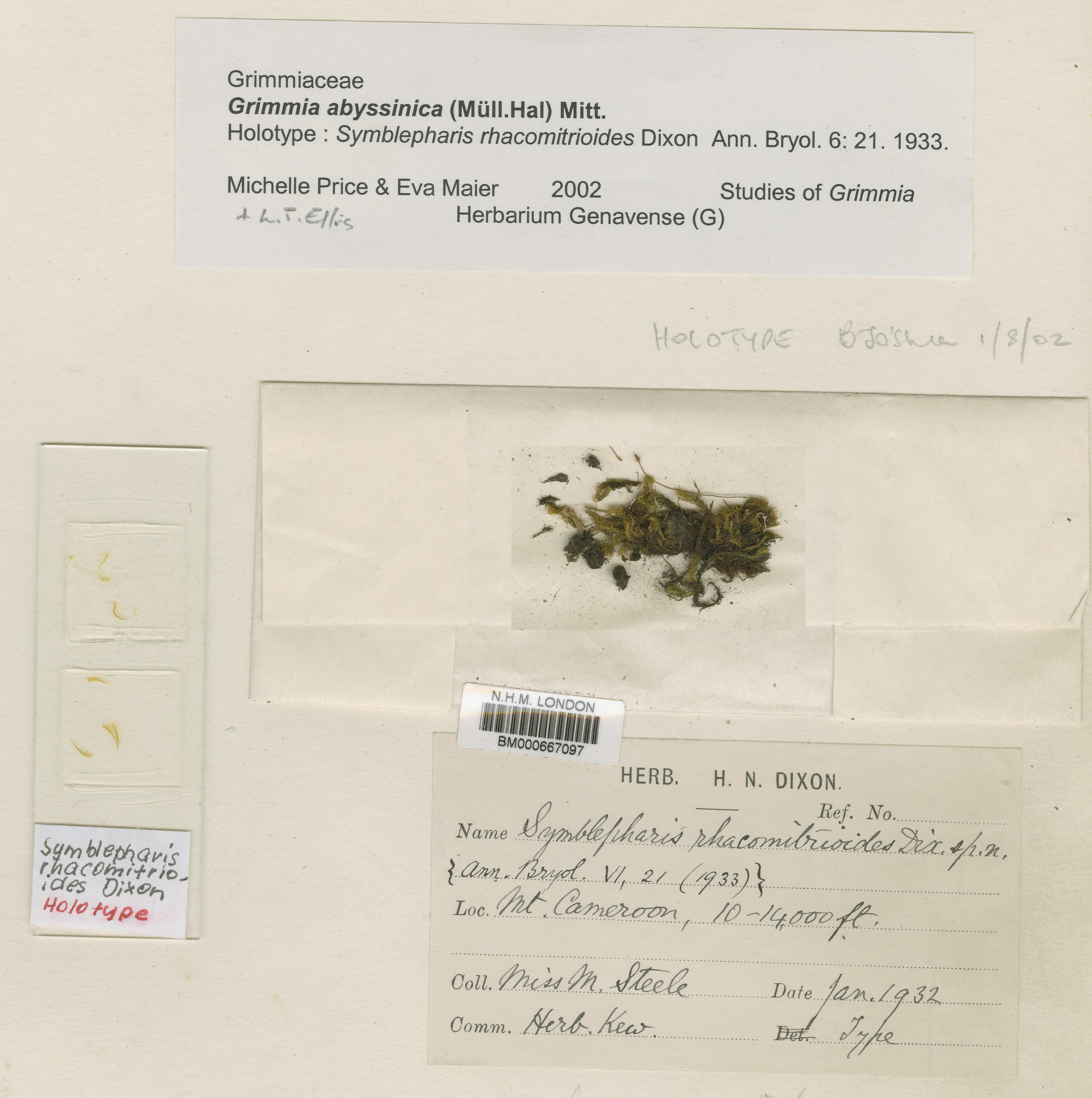
a specimen of a moss, Grimmia abyssinica (Müll.Hal.) Mitt., collected in 1932 by Mary Steele at Mount Cameroon (BM000667097)

=== 1930s ===
1932: from January–February 1932 Steele travelled to Cameroon and collected insects and mosses. In 1934 Steele donated 5,593 specimens of insects from Cameroon to the British Museum. Steele's photographs from Cameroon are at the archives of the Royal Geographical Society.

Steele collected Odonata at Jebel Murra in Sudan from April to July 1932, recording the occurrence of twenty species in a list published in a paper by Cynthia Longfield in 1936.

In November 1934 Steele travelled to India, heading for Calcutta on the MV Dumana, listing her occupation as 'collecting insects.'

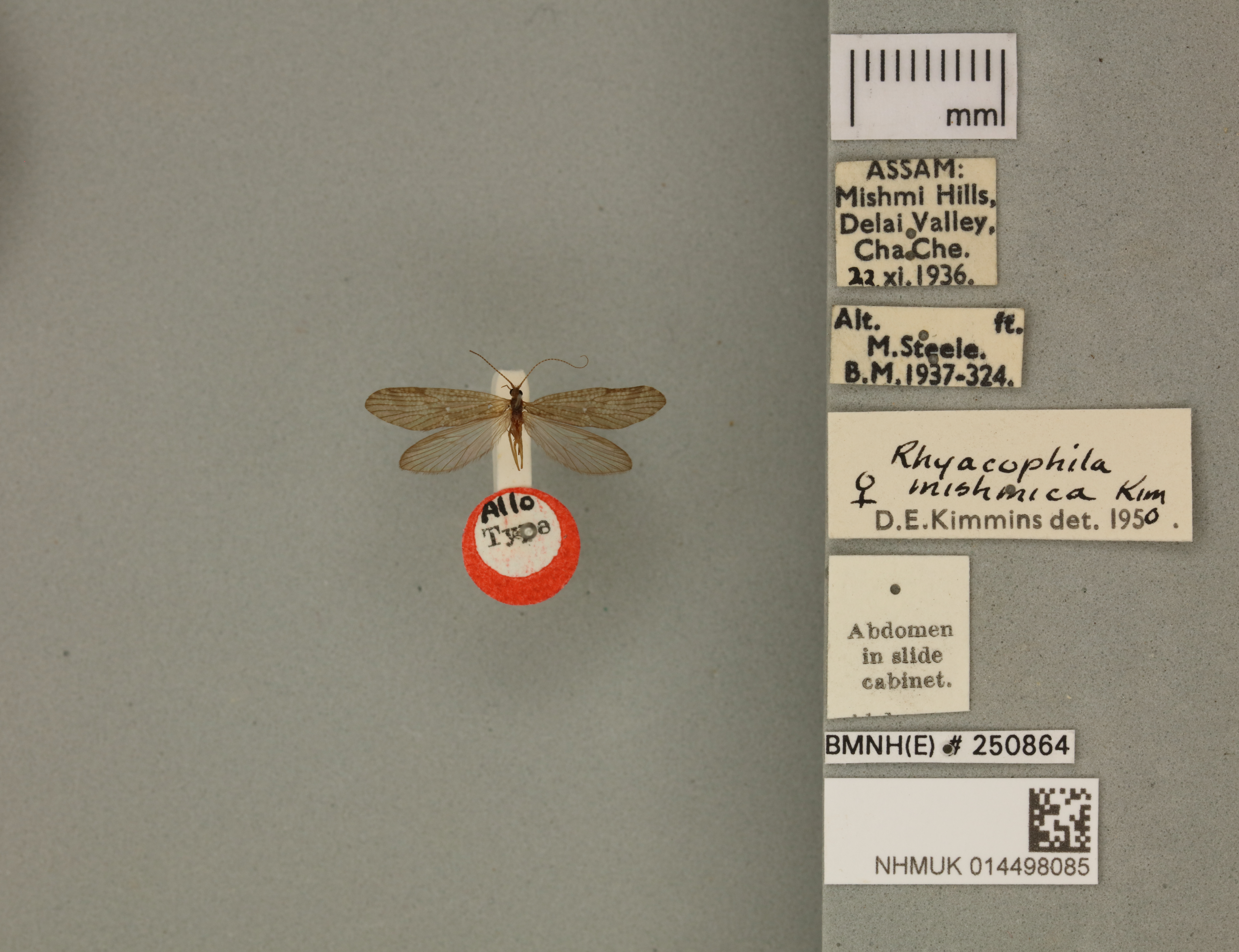
Pinned Type specimen of Rhyacophila mishmica Kimmins 1953, collected in 1936 at Assam, India by Mary Steele (NHMUK014498085)

1935–1936: Steele travelled and collected specimens in the Mishmi Hills, Assam, India (then a very remote locality) in February 1935, and again in November to December 1936. An itinerary for Steele's movements has been reconstructed by Lees et al. (2010) using Steele's expedition logbook and specimen labels.

In 1939 at the beginning of World War II Steele was living in London and registered as part of the "Civil Nursing Reserve, attached to Hospital Train." Train carriages had been converted to emergency hospitals by the UK Government in anticipation of Air Raid casualties, and these would be mainly staffed by women.

=== 1940s ===
In 1945 Steele was preparing a trip to Rhodesia [Zimbabwe] but she had delayed to stay at Guilsborough with her sister Camilla, who was suffering from a terminal illness. Camilla Steele died in February 1946.

During the later part of the 1940s, letters sent to Steele by Norman Denbigh Riley indicate that Steele was a long-term resident of the Outspan Hotel at Nyeri, Kenya, but Riley also wrote to Steele at the Sesame Imperial and Pioneer Club at 49 Grosvenor Street, London, a club which admitted professional women. Specimen records at the NHMUK show that Steele travelled to Tanzania in 1947.

In 1948 Steele was considering travelling to the northern part of Nyasaland [Malawi], encouraged by Norman Riley as he had not had the chance to examine any insects from that locality since Sheffield Airey Neave had collected there 30 or 40 years earlier. It is not clear if Steele actually undertook this trip.

==== Death and legacy ====
Steele died at 7 Knaresborough Place, Earl's Court, London on 10 November 1974.

In 1964 Steele had deposited her papers and photographs relating to Alexander Barns' 1923–1924 expedition to the Congo at the National Archives and Record Service of South Africa. Photographs taken by Steele of travels in Cameroon and India are held in the archives of the Royal Geographical Society.

Natural history specimens collected by Steele are held in the collections of the Natural History Museum, London.

== Selected species described from specimens collected by Steele ==
1942: Trichoptera: Dinarthrena steelae (named in Steele's honour), a caddisfly described by Martin Mosely from material collected by Steele in the Mishmi Hills in 1935.

1970: Lepidoptera: a Noctuid noth Nyodes steelei (named in Steele's honour), described by Bernard Laporte from specimens collected by Steele at Mount Cameroon in 1932.

1999: Diptera: Bactrocera (Zeugodacus) assamensis, a fruit fly described by Ian M. White from a specimen collected by Steele in the Mishmi Hills in March 1935.

2004: Arachnida: Icius steelae (named in Steele's honour) a jumping spider, described by Dmitri V. Logunov from specimens collected by Steele in April 1932 at Jebel Marra in Sudan.
