= John Washington Steele =

American oil tycoon

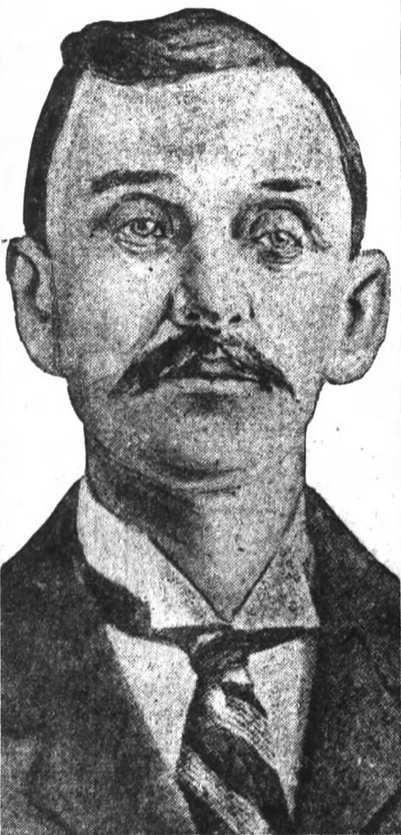
- Born: 1843; Sheakleyville, Pennsylvania
- Died: December 31, 1920 (aged 77); Fort Crook, Nebraska
- Other names: Coal Oil Johnny
- Occupation: Businessman

John Washington Steele (1843 – December 31, 1920), also known as Coal Oil Johnny, was one of the first oil millionaires acquiring their wealth from the oil discovered in Pennsylvania in the mid-19th century.

== Biography ==
John Washington Steele was born in Sheakleyville, Pennsylvania in 1843. In 1864, soon after wealth came to him through inheritance from the McClintocks' oil, the orphan John Steele left the farm which he had inherited from his foster or adoptive family, the McClintocks, and began a lavish and picturesque life, rapidly spending his way through his fortune. He was often seen in Philadelphia riding in his carriage with "the picture of an oil derrick, an oil tank, and a flowing well" painted on its doors. Steele eventually sold his farm to William H. Wickham. In 1862, he married Eleanor J. Moffett, who survived him by six years. After his lavish life-style, Steele fell into bankruptcy. He shuffled around, moving to the Mid-West, eventually becoming a railroad station agent. According to his autobiography, written in 1901, after his fall he was hounded by the public and the press and became a recluse to avoid them.

He died of pneumonia in Fort Crook, Nebraska, December 31, 1920.

== Legacy ==
- "The Ballad of Coal Oil Johnny" by Angela Nuzzo
- There are numerous stories that still circulate in Pennsylvania about him.
- Aites, Richard W. 2007. The Legend of Coal Oil Johnny. iUniverse: Lincoln, Neb. [Fictional account]
- His house has been preserved and moved.
- According to his autobiography, a brand of soap was named after him, much to his dislike.

== Sources ==
- http://www.hagerspeachbasket.com/John_Washington_Steele_Room.htm gives the wife's name as Ellen Moffitt.
- Anon. 1920. ""COAL OIL JOHNNY," ONCE GREAT SPENDER, DEAD; John W. Steele of Pennsylvania Oil Fame Fifty Years Ago Dies a Railroad Station Agent," [New York Times obituary] https://www.nytimes.com/1921/01/02/archives/coal-oil-johnny-once-great-spender-dead-john-w-steele-of.html
- Steele, J. W. 1901. Coal Oil Johnny. Story of His Career as Told by Himself. Press of Hill Publishing Company: New York, 211 pages. Reprinted 1994 by M. A. Mong Publishers and 2006 by Oil Region Alliance: Oil City, PA. Available online at https://openlibrary.org/books/OL7205126M/Coal_oil_Johnny.
- Hoover, Emily. 2009. Review of Steele's autobiography. https://docs.google.com/viewer?a=v&q=cache:LBKqgXosjBIJ:www.oil150.com/assets/pdf/volume-1-issue-8.pdf+%22Coal+oil+johnny%22+steele+oil&hl=ko&gl=kr&pid=bl&srcid=ADGEESjVxVgjY01WS_CdnAjoNia5mCUvfTUaq3dqtNFaZE1fgyZPZ1rdRaKNxsoVCgUc5E8nqxXXvK2BpQVmK56IXMCJO2k2V3MypZNsnM3QdgiblebXjjQjYeit9y9T8qBh6hIolFyx&sig=AHIEtbQQvXLKkOOZQ46zvpM5Z66-x8dKwg
- https://www.nytimes.com/1906/01/07/archives/-coal-oil-johnnys-flush-days-described-by-an-old-comrade.html
- from the Pittsburgh Post-Gazette, 1937 https://news.google.com/newspapers?nid=1144&dat=19370901&id=_8oaAAAAIBAJ&sjid=EkwEAAAAIBAJ&pg=3365,2138449
