= Stolen! =

- Platform: iOS
- Release: Never released to the general public, closed beta start: WW: November 2015

Stolen! was a mobile game released as a closed beta in November 2015 for iOS, in January 2016 the game quickly gained popularity on Twitter and the internet in general. The goal of the game was to buy Twitter accounts and collect money from those accounts. If another person owned a Twitter account, the player could "steal" it from the person. The only way to play the game was to have an access code, either from another player or from the developers themselves. The game's servers were taken offline on January 14, 2016, and the game was removed from the App Store, due to concerns about the game's potential to be used for harassment. An Android version was being tested prior to the cancellation of the app.

On February 19, 2016, the developers revived the game as Famous.

== Criticism ==
Shortly after the large rise in popularity during January 2016, several news outlets, including The Mary Sue and Gadgette published articles raising concern over the ability to use the mechanics of Stolen!, like the ability to edit the profiles of people you have 'Stolen' to harass other people, as well as having to opt out instead of opt into having their profiles in the app. Congresswoman Katherine Clark sent a letter to both Apple and Twitter, urging them to strip the app developers from access to the App Store and Twitter API respectively. The developers have not stated whether Clark's actions were the reason they voluntarily took down the app.
