= Steele Barracks =

Steele Barracks may refer to:

- CFB Edmonton, a Canadian Forces base in Edmonton, Alberta, Canada, that is also known as "Steele Barracks"
- Steele Barracks (Moorebank), an Australian Army barracks in New South Wales, Australia
