= Richard Steele (disambiguation) =

Richard Steele (1672–1729) was an Irish writer and politician .

Richard Steele may also refer to:

- Richard Steele (footballer), Northern Mariana Islands footballer
- Richard Steele (minister) (1629–1692), English Presbyterian minister and Puritan author
- Richard Steele (referee) (born 1944), American boxing referee
- Sir Richard Steele (public house), a public house in London

== See also ==
- Richard Steel, lead guitarist for Spacehog
