= Jack Steele (disambiguation) =

Jack Steele (born 1995) is a professional Australian rules footballer.

Jack Steele may also refer to:

- Jack Steele (comedian) (born 1994), social media personality, brewery owner, and member of the Inspired Unemployed
- Jack Steele (rugby union) (born 1992), Scottish rugby union player
- Jack Steele (soccer) (born 1932), Canadian soccer player
- Jack E. Steele (1924–2009), American medical doctor and army officer
- Jack Steele, brother of Australian poet and academic Peter Steele

== See also ==
- Jack Steel (1898–1941), New Zealand rugby player
- John Steele (disambiguation)
