= Ray Steele =

Ray Steele may refer to:

- Peter Sauer (1900–1949), used the ring name while wrestling in America
- Ray Steele (The Bill), a fictional character in the TV series The Bill
- Ray Steele (wrestler), wrestler based in the United Kingdom
- Raymond Steele, Australian footballer, cricketer and administrator
