= John Steele (historian) =

British historian of ancient science

John Michael Steele
- Education: Durham University (BSc, PhD)
- Scientific career
- Fields: Ancient astronomy
- Workplaces: Brown University
- Thesis: Observations and predictions of eclipse times by astronomers in the pre-telescopic period (1998)
- Doctoral advisor: F. Richard Stephenson

John Michael Steele is a British historian of science. He is Professor of the History of the Exact Sciences in Antiquity and Wilbour Professor of Egyptology and Assyriology at Brown University. He specializes in the history of ancient astronomy, with a particular focus on its development in Babylonia.

Steele earned a first-class degree in Physics from Durham University in 1995, and completed his PhD there in 1998 under the supervision of F. Richard Stephenson.

Following his PhD, Steele was a postdoc at the Dibner Institute for the History of Science and Technology at the Massachusetts Institute of Technology. In 1999, he returned to Durham as a Leverhulme Trust Research Fellow, before joining the University of Toronto in 2002 as E. P. May Fellow at the Institute for the History and Philosophy of Science and Technology. He remained there until 2004, then rejoined Durham as a Royal Society University Research Fellow. He moved to Brown University in 2008.

He was a Fellow of the Institute of Advanced Study at Durham University from October to December 2016. From 2021 to 2025 Steele served as President of the Commission for the History of Ancient and Medieval Astronomy (CHAMA).
