= Hermann Stoll =

German geologist and prehistorian (1904–1944)

Hermann Stoll (13 June 1904 in Eschenau – 10 December 1944) was a German geologist and prehistorian.

Stoll, who comes from a Swabian pastor's family and grew up near Herrenberg in Kayh from the age of 13, studied geology in Tübingen and Stuttgart and received his doctorate in Tübingen in 1927 for his thesis entitled "Versuch einer stratigraphischen Gliederung des Stubensandstein im westlichen Württemberg". From 1929, Stoll was assistant to Robert Rudolf Schmidt at the Prehistoric Research Institute in Tübingen. During this time he devoted himself intensively to the settlement history of the Upper Gäu, where he carried out several excavations in addition to field surveys. The work "Prehistory of the Upper Gäus", published in 1932, is regarded as groundbreaking for modern settlement archaeology, as Stoll's main interest was the connections between settlement and natural conditions. During his time in Tübingen he continued the research begun by Hans Reinerth on the prehistoric hilltop settlement on the Kirchberg near Reusten and excavated the Alamannic cemetery of Hailfingen, which he published in 1939. In 1934 Stoll came to the Rheinische Landesmuseum Bonn. He compiled the so-called Franconian Catalogue and carried out excavations in the Colonia Ulpia Traiana near Xanten and in the Franconian settlement of Gladbach near Neuwied. Since the beginning of 1938 Stoll was assistant of the Baden monument preservation for prehistory and early history in Freiburg im Breisgau under Georg Kraft via the University of Freiburg. From here he carried out various excavations, especially in Merovingian cemeteries (Lienheim, Grimmelshofen, Freiburg-St. Georgen). In 1939 Stoll began excavations in the Alamannic cemetery of Grimmelshofen, which were continued by Ruprecht Gießler in August after his convocation.

During the Second World War Stoll was employed by the Luftnachrichtentruppe in Silesia, where he carried out further archaeological research. He last served in Romania and died after a war injury in December 1944 in Soviet captivity.

Stoll's archaeological work was particularly noted in the field of early history. From his settlement archaeological interests he formulated questions which are still regarded as innovative and influential in the field. Concessions to nationalist ideas and corresponding terminology, which had prevailed in the Tübingen Institute since the 1920s, are conspicuously rare in Stoll's work. Stoll asked about the relationship between cemetery and settlement, the forms of settlement in the Merovingian period and the population figures. Stoll worked intensively on an interdisciplinary approach and a discussion with the history of the country.

== Publications (selection) ==
- "Prehistory of the Upper Gäues. Publication. Württ. state office monument pl. 7. Öhringen 1933
- "Medieval clay field bottles from Swabia", Germania 17, 1933, 210-213
- (with K. H. Wagner): Franconian settlement with cemetery near Gladbach, district Neuwied. postscript German prehistoric times 13, 1937, 119-121
- "The Alamanni Tombs of Hailfingen in Württemberg," Germ. Denkm. Migration period 4th Berlin 1939
- The Franconian settlement of the Neuwieder Basin, Rhine. Ancient times in word and picture 1939, 120 ff.
- "New Works on the Early History of the Alamanni," Bad. Fundber. 16, 1940, 119–128
- "Three extraordinary Alamannic cemeteries and their interpretation," Zeitschr. Württ. Landesgesch. 5, 1941, 1-18.
- "Population figures from early history", World as history 8, 1942, 69-74
- "The Alamanni Tombs of Freiburg," district of St. Georgen. A contribution to the dating of the Alamannic villages of -hausen. Bathroom. Fundber. 18, 1948/50, 107–126

== obituary ==
- Magazine for Württemberg. National history 8, 1947/48, 414-444 (Peter Goessler)
  With list of publications
