= Chester I. Steele =

United States Navy rear admiral (1913–1967)

Chester I. Steele (December 12, 1913 – July 17, 1967) was a Rear Admiral in the United States Coast Guard.

== Biography ==
Chester I. Steele was born on December 12, 1913, in Rehoboth Beach, Delaware. He graduated from Neptune High School in Neptune Township, New Jersey. He attended the Peddie School in Hightstown, New Jersey, for a postgraduate year before being appointed a cadet at the U.S. Coast Guard Academy on August 4, 1933.

In 1937, Steele married Olive Perry. They would have two daughters. He died of a myocardial infarction on July 16, 1967.

== Career ==
Steele graduated from the Coast Guard Academy on September 20, 1937, and was commissioned as an ensign. Among his early assignments were serving aboard USCGC Campbell and USCGC Pontchartrain.

After a stint as commanding officer of Vema, a training vessel employed by the Maritime Service Training Station, Steele was stationed as an instructor at the Coast Guard Academy before assuming command of USS Abilene and was deployed for World War II. His commands in the years after the war ended included USCGC Jonquil, USCGC Mendota and USCGC Eagle. Steele was assigned to multiple tours of duty at the Academy and he completed studies and later taught at the Naval War College.

In 1964, Steele assumed command of USCG Activities Europe. Two years later, he was made the commander of the Second Coast Guard District and remained so for the rest of his life. Decorations Steele received included the American Defense Service Medal, the World War II Victory Medal and the National Defense Service Medal.
