= Susan J. Swift Steele =

American social reformer

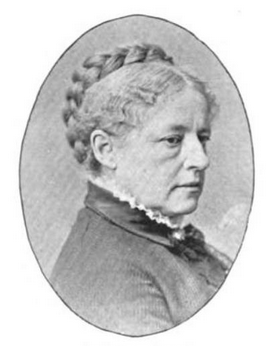
- Susan J. Swift Steele (1893)
- Born: December 25, 1822; Provincetown, Massachusetts, United States
- Died: September 4, 1895 (aged 72)
- Education: Wilbraham Wesleyan Academy
- Occupation: social reformer
- Known for: President, Wisconsin Women's Temperance Alliance; President, Wisconsin Woman's Christian Temperance Union
- Notable work: marched in Women's Crusade
- Spouse: Rev. George McKendree Steele (m. 1852)
- Parents: Capt. John Swift (father); Lydia Swift (mother)

Susan J. Swift Steele (December 25, 1822 – September 4, 1895) was an American social reformer. She served as Wisconsin State President of the Woman's Christian Temperance Union (WCTU). She was affiliated with the Woman's Foreign Missionary Society of the Methodist Episcopal Church, and the Newton, Massachusetts Wesleyan Home, among other organizations.

== Biography ==
Susan Jane Swift was born in Provincetown, Massachusetts, on December 25, 1822. Her parents were Capt. John and Lydia Swift. She was a student at Wilbraham Wesleyan Academy, where she was graduated in 1850, as valedictorian. At about the age of eighteen, she joined the Methodist Episcopal Church.

After the completion of her course of study, she engaged for a time in teaching -the longest period being in connection with her alma mater- both before and after her marriage.

On July 1, 1852, she married Rev. George McKendree Steele, one of the teachers at the Academy. Twelve years a most effective and devoted worker, she shared in the pastorates of her husband at Warren, Massachusetts; Fitchburg, Massachusetts; Lowell, Massachusetts; Watertown, Massachusetts; Lynn, Massachusetts; and Boston.

In the year 1865, her husband was called to the presidency of Lawrence University at Appleton, Wisconsin, serving for fourteen years. Mrs. Steele, as secretary for the State, organized many of the auxiliaries of the Woman's Foreign Missionary Society of the Methodist Episcopal Church in Wisconsin.

The temperance reform also enlisted Steele's effort. In 1873–74, she marched with the ranks of the historic Women's Crusade, and in October 1874, Steele was elected president of the Wisconsin Women's Temperance Alliance. At Chautauqua, Steele was involved with the First Woman's National Temperance Convention. The presidency of the National WCTU, conferred upon Frances Willard in 1878, had been previously offer to Steele, who refused the nomination. She organized many WCTU societies, and was for years Wisconsin State president of the body. As a platform lecturer and a parliamentary leader, she was at this period in as constant service as her home duties would permit.

In 1877, she traveled in Europe, visiting England, France, Belgium, Italy, Switzerland, and Germany. She also delivered frequent addresses on missionary and temperance themes.

In 1879, her husband having accepted a call to the principalship of Wesleyan Academy, she returned to the East and resided again at Wilbraham, Massachusetts. From this time, she found herself less capable of working. She declined many nominations to offices, including the state presidency of Massachusetts for the WCTU, with the remark, “It requires greater wisdom to know when to leave off than when to begin.” Still, in a circle that by most women would have been thought a wide one, she continued for more than a decade to show her interest in all the forms of missionary and temperance work to which her earlier life had been given.

In 1892, she came with her husband to live in Auburndale, Massachusetts when Dr. Steele accepted a professorship at Lasell Seminary (now Lasell University). Even here, though seventy years of age, she identified herself with many forms of Christian work. Two days before her death, she presided over a meeting of the committee on the Newton Wesleyan Home. Her last conversation before she died was in the interest of the Woman's Foreign Missionary Society. She died on September 4, 1895. At her death, she was president of the Wesleyan Home for missionaries' children at Newton, Massachusetts; vice-president of the New England branch of the Woman's Foreign Missionary society; and president of the auxiliary at Auburndale.

Of Steele's children two daughters died in childhood. Her son, George Francis, of Chicago, and four grandchildren survived her.

== Selected works ==
- Wisconsin state chapter, History of the Women's Temperance Crusade (Philadelphia: Office of the Christian Woman, 1878)
