= Andrew Steele (astrobiologist) =

Andrew Steele is an astrobiologist at the Geophysical Laboratory at Carnegie Institution for Science. He uses traditional and biotechnological approaches for the detection of microbial life in the field of astrobiology and Solar System exploration. His research has led to discoveries of new forms of carbon in meteorites, new mechanisms of organic synthesis on Earth and Mars, and the presence of water in lunar and Martian rocks. Steele has developed several instrument and mission concepts for future Mars missions and was involved in NASA’s 2011 Mars Science Laboratory mission, as a member of the Sample Analysis at Mars team. He also tested instruments on board the Arctic Mars Analogue Svalbard Expedition in the Arctic.

== Education and career ==
Steele attended the University of Central Lancashire in the United Kingdom where he received a B.S. in microbiology and biochemistry in 1992. In 1996, he earned a PhD in biotechnology from the University of Portsmouth. From 1999 to 2001, Steele worked as an assistant professor at the University of Montana, and as a researcher at the University of Oxford. From 1999 to 2003, he was a lecturer at the University of Portsmouth. After 2003, Steele was a postdoctoral fellow at NASA Johnson Space Center. He now currently works for the Carnegie Institution of Science and is an active member of the NASA Astrobiology Institute.

== Research ==
Steele’s research focuses on the detection of microbial life on Mars. He creates instrument and mission concepts for Mars missions. Steele uses a technique called “high-resolution confocal Raman imaging,” which is used to analyze samples collected during missions. He and his team used this technique to analyze samples from Mars in 2012 and identified hydrocarbons, which are important for organic chemistry reactions and play key roles in the creation of life. By studying these hydrocarbons, Steele was able to prove that the hydrocarbons did not come from biological origins, but rather from volcanic activity on Mars. Steele is currently investigating a new Martian meteorite, which contains more water than any other Martian meteorite found before, as well as hydrocarbons. Similar to his 2012 discovery, Steele was able to determine that the hydrocarbons did not result from contamination, but from a non-biological process, helping to answer important questions about the origin of life. Collectively, his investigations have helped inform discussion about the potential habitability of Mars.

== Awards ==
In 2012, the Royal Society of London awarded Steele the Wolfson Professorial Award.
