= David Steele (historian) =

British historian (1934–2019)

David Steele (1934 – 17 June 2019) was a British historian at the University of Leeds who focused on nineteenth-century British political history.

== Academic career ==
Steele taught briefly at University College Dublin before becoming a Senior Lecturer in Modern History at the University of Leeds. He remained at Leeds for 34 years until his retirement in 1999.

Steele's 1974 work on the Irish Land Acts, Irish Land and British Politics, grew out of his doctoral thesis. Michael Bentley ranked Steele's 1999 biography of Lord Salisbury with Andrew Roberts's work as the best guides to Salisbury's life. G. R. Searle said Steele's biography "brings out [Salisbury's] progressive impulses".

== Selected publications ==
- Irish Land and British Politics: Tenant-Right and Nationality, 1865–1870 (Cambridge: Cambridge University Press, 1974). ISBN 0521204216
- Palmerston and Liberalism, 1855–1865 (Cambridge: Cambridge University Press, 1991). ISBN 0521400457
- Lord Salisbury: A Political Biography (London: University College London Press, 1999). ISBN 1857283260
