= Jonathan Steele =

Jonathan Steele may refer to:

- Jonathan Steele (journalist), British journalist and author
- Jonathan Steele (comics), the comic book series
- Jonny Steele, footballer

== See also ==
- Jon Steel, rugby league footballer
- John Steele (disambiguation)
