= Stoll, Kentucky =

Unincorporated community in Kentucky, United States

- Unincorporated community
- Location within Kentucky Location within the United States
- Coordinates: 37°51′18″N 83°30′32″W
- Country: United States
- State: Kentucky
- County: Menifee
- Elevation: 1,043 ft (318 m)
- Time zone: UTC-6 (Central (CST))
  - Summer (DST): UTC-5 (CST)
- GNIS feature ID: 2400809

Stoll is an unincorporated community located in Menifee County, Kentucky, United States.
