= Charlie Steele Jr. =

New Zealand footballer

Charlie Steele
Personal information
- Full name: Charles Steele Jr.
- Date of birth: 30 March 1930
- Place of birth: Stockton, New Zealand
- Date of death: 6 January 2008 (aged 77)
- Position: Outside right

Senior career*
Years	Team	Apps	(Gls)
1948 - 1950	Stockton		
1951 - 1952	Millerton Thistle		
1952 - 1955	Invercargill Thistle		
1956 - 1959	Western		
1960 - 1968	Invercargill Thistle		

International career
1954–1958	New Zealand	8	(6)

Managerial career
- 1969: Invercargill Thistle
- * Club domestic league appearances and goals

Charles Steele Jr. (30 March 1930 – 6 January 2008) was an association football player who represented New Zealand at international level.

Steele was accomplished in both rugby union and association football, playing club and provincial rugby on Saturdays and football on Sundays, earning representative honours with Westland. He played for Buller against the 1950 touring British Lions

Playing association football, Steele represented Southland, Otago, Buller, Canterbury and played for New Zealand on 23 occasions.

Steele's first club side was Stockton who competed in the 1949 Chatham Cup. He then moved to rival side Millerton Thistle, competing in the 1951 Chatham Cup before moving to Invercargill Thistle. In 1953 he scored the winning goal for Southland against Otago to lift the Keach Cup. He was selected for the South Island representative side in 1953. Steele toured Australia with the New Zealand team in 1954. In 1955 as an Invercargill Thistle player, Steele was selected to play for New Zealand against the touring South China AA of Hong Kong. He was first selected for Canterbury in 1956 to play against Wellington, after moving to Western following the 1955 season. Later in 1958, Steele assisted the winning goal helping Canterbury to win the English FA Trophy from Auckland. In 1958 he toured New Caledonia with the New Zealand team. In 1960 Steele shifted back to Southland to once again play for Invercargill Thistle.

== International career ==
Steele scored on his full New Zealand début in a 2–1 win over Australia on 14 August 1954 and ended his international playing career with eight A-international caps to his credit, scoring six goals. His final cap was an appearance in a 2–1 win over New Caledonia on 14 September 1958. Including unofficial matches, Steele played 23 matches for New Zealand and scored 12 goals.

Steele's father, Charlie Steele Sr., had made two appearances for New Zealand in 1927, and his début marked the first time a father - son pair had represented New Zealand.

Steele died on 6 January 2008.
