= Martin R. Steele =

United States Marine Corps general

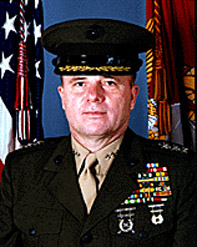
- Born: 15 September 1946 (age 80); Philadelphia, Pennsylvania
- Military career
- Allegiance: United States of America
- Branch: United States Marine Corps
- Service years: 1965–1999
- Rank: Lieutenant General
- Nickname: "Marty"
- Commands: 1st Light Armored Vehicle Battalion; 1st Tank Battalion; Marine Corps Base Quantico
- Conflicts: Vietnam War; Operations Desert Shield & Desert Storm
- Awards: Defense Distinguished Service Medal; Distinguished Service Medal; Defense Superior Service Medal; Legion of Merit
- Other work: President & CEO - Intrepid Sea, Air & Space Museum

Martin R. Steele (born 15 September 1946) is a retired United States Marine Corps lieutenant general. He served in combat during the Vietnam War and in Operations Desert Shield and Desert Storm. He served for 35 years in the Marine Corps before retiring in 1999. He then became the president and CEO of the Intrepid Sea, Air & Space Museum in New York City.

== Early years and education ==
Martin R. Steele was born in Philadelphia, Pennsylvania. He grew up in Fayetteville, Arkansas. He earned a Bachelor of Arts degree from the University of Arkansas (1974) and Masters of Arts degrees from Central Michigan University (1981), Salve Regina College (1985) and the Naval War College (1985). His military education includes the Armor Officer Advanced Course, the Marine Corps Command and Staff College and the Naval War College.

== Military career ==
Steele enlisted in the U.S. Marine Corps in January 1965. His initial tour of duty was with the 1st Tank Battalion, 1st Marine Division, Camp Pendleton, California, during which he deployed to the Republic of Vietnam. Subsequently, assigned as a corporal to Officer Candidates School, he was commissioned a second lieutenant in January 1967.

A tour of duty as a platoon commander, executive officer, and tank company commander in the 2nd Tank Battalion was followed by duty aboard the USS Saint Paul (CA-73) in Southeast Asia and an assignment as Officer-in-Charge of Sea School in Portsmouth, Virginia. In 1973, he returned to Camp Pendleton and served as a tank company commander, battalion S-3, and Aide-de-Camp to the Commanding General of the 1st Marine Division.

An overseas assignment as an assault amphibian vehicle company commander and battalion S-3 was followed by duty as the Marine Corps Liaison Officer to the project Manager M-60/M-1 Tank programs at the U.S. Army Tank-Automotive command in Warren, MI. He also served at Headquarters Marine Corps as the Tank Acquisition Project Officer.

In August 1985, Steele returned to the 1st Marine Division, where he served initially as the Commanding Officer, 1st Light Armored Vehicle Battalion until June 1986, and then as the Commanding Officer, 1st Tank Battalion until June 1988. The following month, he transferred overseas where he was assigned as Operations Officer, C/J/G-3, Combined Forces Command, Republic of Korea. Upon his return from overseas in August 1990, he assumed the duties as the Deputy Director, Marine Air-Ground Task Force Warfighting Center, MCCDC Quantico.

During Operation Desert Shield/Desert Storm, Steele served as G-3, MARCENT (FWD) aboard the USS Blue Ridge (LCC-19). In July 1992, he was assigned duty as the Director, Warfighting Development Integration Division at Quantico. While serving in this capacity, he was selected in March 1993 for promotion to brigadier general; and was promoted on May 20, 1993, and was assigned duty as Commanding General, Marine Corps Base Quantico on June 15, 1993.

Steele next served as the Director for Strategic Planning and Policy, J-5, U.S. Forces Pacific at Camp H.M. Smith, Hawaii from 1995 to 1997. While serving in this capacity, he was selected in December 1996 for promotion to lieutenant general. His final assignment was as Deputy Chief of Staff for Plans, Policies and Operations at Headquarters Marine Corps. Steele retired from the Marine Corps in August 1999 after 35 years of service.

== Post-Marine Corps ==
Steele became the president and CEO of the Intrepid Sea, Air & Space Museum in June 1999, leading the organization until Summer 2002. He continues to serve the museum as a trustee emeritus.

== Awards and decorations ==
LtGen Martin Steele has been awarded the following:

| 1st Row | Defense Distinguished Service Medal | Navy Distinguished Service Medal | Defense Superior Service Medal | Legion of Merit |
| 2nd Row | Meritorious Service Medal | Navy and Marine Corps Commendation Medal w/ 1 award star | Combat Action Ribbon | Navy Presidential Unit Citation |
| 3rd Row | Joint Meritorious Unit Award | Navy Unit Commendation | Navy Meritorious Unit Commendation | National Defense Service Medal w/ 1 service star |
| 4th Row | Vietnam Service Medal w/ 2 service stars | Southwest Asia Service Medal w/ 1 service star | Navy Sea Service Deployment Ribbon | Navy & Marine Corps Overseas Service Ribbon |
| 5th Row | Vietnam Gallantry Cross unit citation | Vietnam Campaign Medal | Kuwait Liberation Medal (Saudi Arabia) | Kuwait Liberation Medal (Kuwait) |

He also received the Vietnam Civil Actions Medal Unit Citation as well as several awards of both the Expert Rifle and Expert Pistol badges.
