= Orlo K. Steele =

U.S. major general

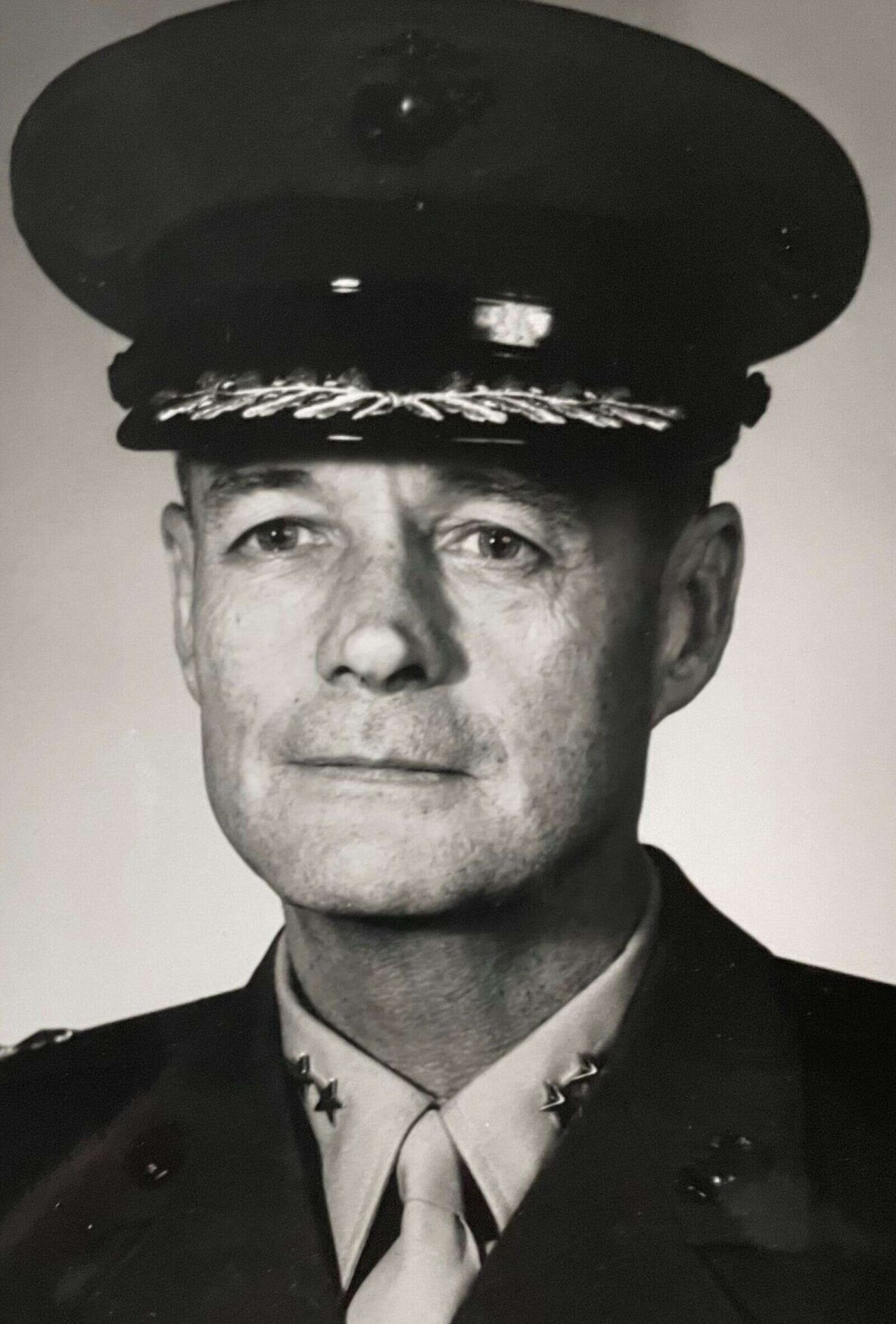
- Born: 28 October 1932 (age 93); Oakland, California, U.S.
- Military career
- Allegiance: United States
- Branch: United States Marine Corps
- Service years: 1956–1990
- Rank: Major general
- Commands: 2nd Marine Division
- Conflicts: Vietnam War: Battle of Hue

Orlo K. Steele (born 28 October 1932) is a retired major general in the United States Marine Corps whose assignments included Inspector General of the Marine Force and Commander of the 2nd Marine Division. He graduated from Stanford University in 1956.
