= Evelyn (Edison) Newman =

Evelyn (Edison) Newman (July 25, 1920 – September 1, 2015) was an American philanthropist known for her fundraising and charitable contributions to the city of St. Louis, Missouri, including Sophia M. Sachs Butterfly House at Faust County Park, Forest Park Forever, Forest Park Conservancy. She and her husband Eric P. Newman established the Eric P. Newman Education Center at the Washington University School of Medicine and the Newman Money Museum at Washington University's Sam Fox School of Design & Visual Arts.

== Early life ==
Evelyn Edison was born in Atlanta, Georgia. She moved to St. Louis, Missouri, when the family shoe business, Edison Brothers Inc., relocated. She graduated from John Burroughs School in 1937, and attended Goucher College in Baltimore, but later transferred to Washington University in St Louis. On November 29, 1939, she married the American numismatist Eric P. Newman.

== Career ==
Newman began her retail experience working for the May Department Stores Co. She then joined Edison Brothers Stores working as a buyer and later developer of retail concepts. In the late 1940s, Edison Brothers was the largest chain of women's shoe stores in the country.

In 1982, she established the Evelyn E. Newman Group, which helped to bring business expertise and sensible business practices to not-for-profit organizations.

== Philanthropy ==
Newman was known as the "queen of fundraising" in the St. Louis community. In 1960, she helped create a high-end used clothing store to support the Scholarship Foundation of St. Louis. Since then, ScholarShop stores in Webster Groves and Clayton have generated about $23 million in interest-free loans and grants for college students. She is also noted with establishing such local traditions as the Greater St. Louis Book Fair, the Gypsy Caravan (benefiting the St. Louis Symphony), the Little Shop Around the Corner (benefiting the Missouri Botanical Garden), as well as the Sophia M. Sachs Butterfly House at Faust County Park in Chesterfield, Missouri, which was inspired from her travels to Thailand visiting the butterfly house.

In the 1980s, Newman was the first executive director of Forest Park Forever, the nonprofit organization that has helped turn Forest Park into one of the region's biggest attractions, which has grown to a $6.5 million annual operating budget and an endowment of more than $75 million.

Newman was a co-founding director in 1980 of The First Street Forum, what is now Contemporary Art Museum St. Louis.

== Awards and honors ==
Evelyn Newman was awarded an honorary doctorate from the University of Missouri–St. Louis and received the Robert S. Brookings Award from Washington University in St. Louis. She was also the first recipient of the Award for Lifetime Achievement of the Arts & Education Council.
