= Charlie Steele Sr. =

New Zealand footballer

Charlie Steele
Personal information
- Full name: Charles Steele Sr.
- Place of birth: Ayrshire, Scotland

Senior career*
Years	Team	Apps	(Gls)
- Stockton Hearts

International career
1927	New Zealand	2	(0)
- * Club domestic league appearances and goals

Charlie Steele Sr. is a former football (soccer) player who represented New Zealand at international level.

Steele played two A-international matches for the All Whites in 1927, both against the touring Canadians, the first a 2–2 draw on 25 June 1927, the second a 1–2 loss on 2 July.

Steele's son Charlie Steele Jr. later represented New Zealand also, to become the first father - son pair to represent New Zealand.
