= Charles R. Steele =

American engineer (1933–2021)

Charles R. Steele

Charles Richard Steele (August 15, 1933 – December 9, 2021) was an American Professor of Aeronautics and Astronautics and of Mechanical Engineering at Stanford University.

Steele was known for his work analyzing stresses and deformation of beams, membranes, and shells, and for modeling and analyzing the mechanics of the cochlea (on which he has published over 50 scientific papers). In 1995, he was elected to the National Academy of Engineering, "For contributions to the theory of thin shells, to understanding of human hearing, and to bioengineering."

He received his B.S. in Mechanical Engineering from Texas A&M in 1956, and Ph.D. in Engineering Mechanics under Wilhelm Flügge at Stanford in 1960.
