= Annie Betancourt =

American politician (born 1947)

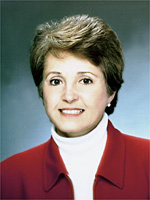

Member of the Florida House of Representatives from the 116th district
- In office November 8, 1994 – November 5, 2002
- Preceded by: Art Simon
- Succeeded by: Marcelo Llorente

Personal details
- Born: March 3, 1947 (age 79) Havana, Cuba
- Party: Democratic
- Education: Miami-Dade Community College (A.A.); University of Miami (B.A.)
- Occupation: Administrator

Annie Betancourt is a Democratic politician who served as a member of the Florida House of Representatives from 1994 through 2002, and was the Democratic nominee for Florida's 25th congressional district in 2002.

== Early life and career ==
Betancourt was born in Havana, and moved to Florida in 1960. She attended the Miami-Dade Community College, receiving her associate degree in 1972, and the University of Miami, graduating with a bachelor's degree in psychology in 1974. Betancourt held a variety of positions in Miami politics, including two separate appointments as the executive director of the Dade County legislative delegation, and President of the League of Women Voters of Dade County. In 1991, Betancourt was appointed by Governor Lawton Chiles to the South Florida Water Management District, and worked to increase public transparency about the District's operations.

== Florida House of Representatives ==
In 1994, Incumbent Democratic State Representative Art Simon opted to challenge State Comptroller Gerald Lewis in the Democratic primary rather than seek re-election. Betancourt ran to succeed him in the 116th District, based in Kendall and faced Ed Blanco and John Svadbik in the Democratic primary. She won the primary in a landslide, receiving 65 percent of the vote to Svadbik's 18 percent and Bianco's 17 percent. In the general election, Betancourt faced Republican nominee Peter Gonzalez, an aide to County Commissioner Miguel Díaz de la Portilla and the Republican nominee. She defeated Gonzalez in a landslide, receiving 57 percent of the vote to his 43 percent, becoming the first Cuban-American Democrat in the State House since 1925.

In 1996, Betancourt ran for re-election, and was challenged by Dulce Cuetara, an aide to State Representative Bruno Barreiro. Republicans targeted Betancourt's seat as they sought to win a majority in the State House, but she won re-election in a landslide, receiving 60 percent of the vote to Cuetera's 40 percent. She was challenged by police detective Frank Carollo, the brother of Miami Mayor Joe Carollo, in 1998, and won re-election by a wide margin, receiving 65 percent of the vote.

Betancourt ran for re-election to a fourth term in 2000, and was challenged by former state legislative aide Alina Garcia, the Republican nominee. Betancourt emphasized her experience in the legislature, and entered the race as the clear frontrunner ultimately defeating Garcia in a landslide, winning 58 percent of the vote.

== 2002 congressional campaign ==
Betancourt was term-limited in 2002, and ran for Congress in the newly created 25th congressional district. She defeated Reporter Lorna Virgili in the Democratic primary in a landslide, winning 71 percent of the vote, and advanced to the general election, where she faced Republican State Representative Mario Díaz-Balart.

During the campaign, Betancourt challenged the United States embargo against Cuba, which she argued had "failed miserably," becoming one of the first Cuban-American politicians to publicly denounce the embargo.

However, despite polls suggesting a close race, Díaz-Balart defeated Betancourt in a landslide, winning 65 percent of the vote.
