= Before the Americas =

Washington DC area art exhibition, 2025–2026

Before the Americas was an art exhibition curated by Cheryl D. Edwards, shown at George Mason University (Gillespie Gallery) from August 25 to November 15, 2025, and at the University of Maryland Global Campus (UMGC Arts Program Gallery) from February 15 to May 10, 2026. Commissioned by the Art Museum of the Americas (AMA) in 2021, the exhibition presented an art survey by 39 artists of African American, Afro-Latino, Latino, and Caribbean descent, representing 17 Organization of American States (OAS) member countries, and addressed themes such as ancestral memory, migration, and transnational cultural connections. The AMA cancellation of the planned 2025 showing—reported to be linked to changes in U.S. government funding policy—led to the exhibition being hosted and funded by George Mason University and private donors.

== Background and commission ==
The AMA commissioned an art historical survey in 2021 as part of programming tied to regional initiatives addressing the Decade for People of African Descent in the Americas. The project was commissioned by AMA directors Adriana Ospina and Pablo Zúñiga and developed with curator Cheryl D. Edwards. The proposed exhibition had received funding allocated by the U.S. Ambassador to the OAS, Francisco O. Mora, in 2021.

Cheryl D. Edwards was engaged by the AMA as curator due to her expertise in the work of Black artists in the Washington, D.C. area.

== Cancellation at the Art Museum of Americas ==
The AMA had scheduled the exhibition to open on March 21, 2025. On January 20, 2025 (the day of his inauguration), Donald Trump signed Executive Order 14151, mandating the termination of all activities relating to diversity, equity, inclusion, and accessibility (DEIA). On February 6, 2025, following changes to U.S. government DEIA-related funding policy, the museum removed Before the Americas from its 2025 calendar. Contemporary reporting linked the removal of the exhibition to those policy changes and to a reevaluation of federally funded programming.

Following the cancellation, Donald H. Russell, the curator at George Mason University, offered to host the exhibition. The show was produced with additional funding from private donors (reported as approximately 50 to 60 by Cheryl D. Edwards).

== George Mason University exhibition and symposium ==
The exhibition was organized by George Mason University curator Donald H. Russell and shown at GMU's Gillespie Gallery from August 25 to November 15, 2025. A corresponding symposium, the Before the Americas Symposium, was held on October 4, 2025, at GMU's Center for the Arts Concert Hall, accompanied by a GMU exhibition catalog. The symposium included two artist panels, a historical perspectives discussion, a panel of curators, a panel of collectors, and a live performance by Luis Vasquez La Roche.

== University of Maryland Global Campus exhibition and artist panel ==
Before the Americas was shown at the University of Maryland Global Campus (UMGC) from February 15 to May 10, 2026, at the UMGC Arts Program Gallery. A corresponding artist panel was held on February 15, 2026, accompanied by a UMGC exhibition catalog.

== Artists and works ==
The exhibition featured works by international artists whose contributions to American art are well documented, including Amy Sherald, Renée Stout, Joyce Scott, Sam Gilliam, Martin Puryear, Alma Thomas, Lois Mailou Jones, Elizabeth Catlett, Wifredo Lam, E.J. Montgomery, Samella Lewis, Alexander Skunder Boghossian, Alonzo Davis and David C. Driskell.

The works explored issues of ancestral memory, migration, and interconnectivity in African American, Afro-Latino, Latino, and Caribbean communities across mediums including sculpture, printmaking, and book art.

== Reception ==
The exhibition was enthusiastically received at both venues. Interest in the exhibition was international. The founder of the Monte Azul Center for the Arts in Costa Rica wrote: “Curated with extraordinary insight and unflinching resolve, this catalog and exhibition stand as a testament to the power of art to confront erasure and reclaim space. It is a manifestation of truth—unapologetic, complex, and deeply rooted in the lived experiences of Afro-descendant artists across the Americas." The show garnered attention in a national newspaper in Mexico, the home of several of the artists featured in the exhibition.

The exhibition’s cancellation at the AMA and subsequent re-stagings received national and international media attention. "Before the Americas" was foregrounded in public debates over the impact of the Trump Administration's DEI policy on cultural funding and museum programming, with coverage in outlets including: The New York Times, The Washington Post, Le Monde, Hyperallergic, ArtNews, Art Forum, NPR and The Guardian.
