= Carlos Trujillo =

American lobbyist and diplomat (born 1983)

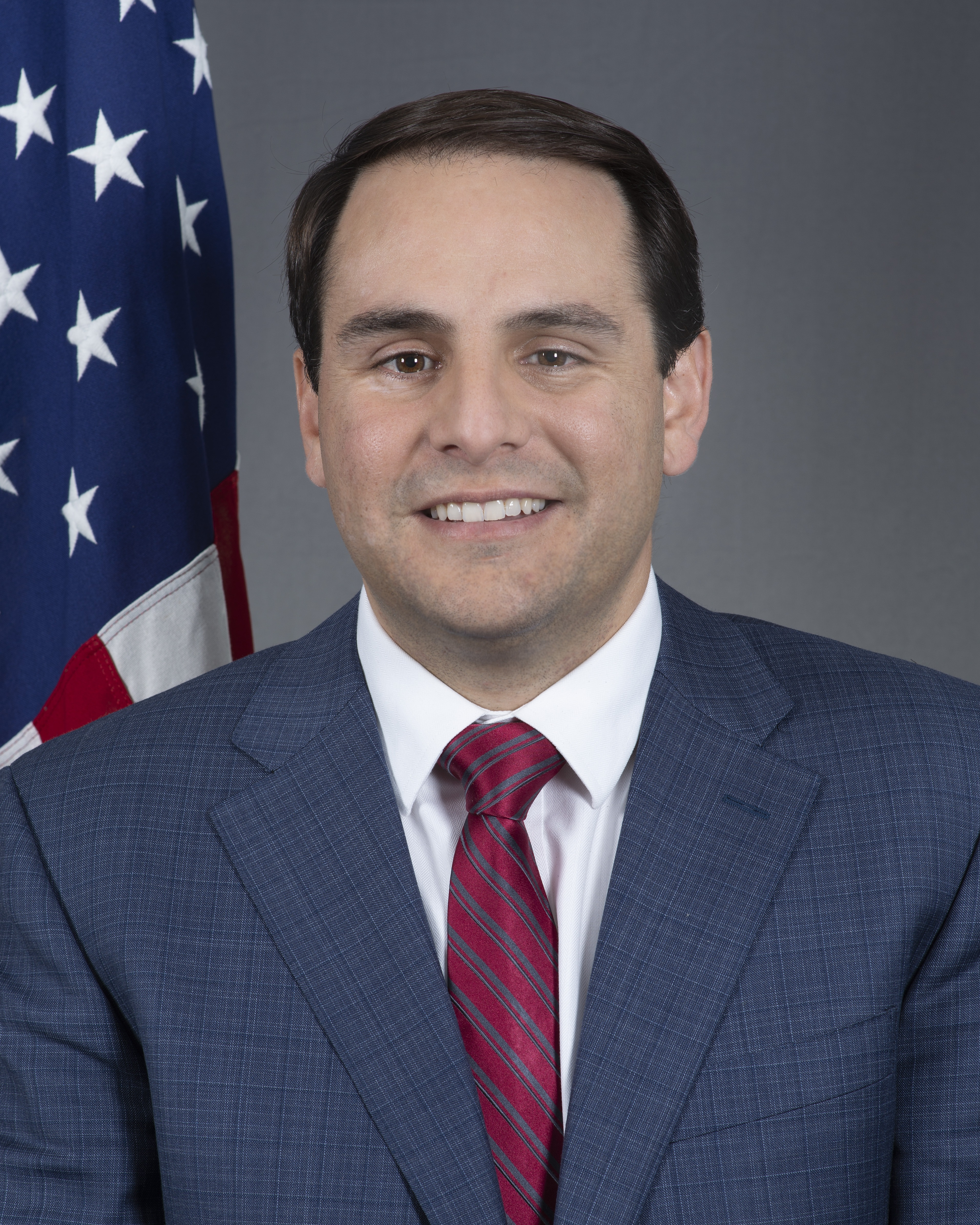

20th United States Ambassador to the Organization of American States
- In office April 5, 2018 – January 19, 2021
- President: Donald Trump
- Preceded by: Carmen Lomellin
- Succeeded by: Francisco O. Mora

Member of the Florida House of Representatives
- In office November 2, 2010 – March 23, 2018
- Preceded by: Marcelo Llorente
- Succeeded by: Ana Maria Rodriguez
- Constituency: 116th district (2010–2012); 105th district (2012–2018)

Personal details
- Born: February 25, 1983 (age 43) Long Island, New York
- Party: Republican
- Spouse: Carmen Mir
- Children: 3 sons, 1 daughter
- Education: Spring Hill College (BA); Florida State University College of Law (JD)
- Profession: Attorney

Carlos Trujillo (born February 25, 1983) is an American lobbyist and government affairs professional who previously served as United States Ambassador to the Organization of American States. A member of the Republican Party, he previously served four terms in the Florida House of Representatives from 2010 until his appointment as ambassador.

In March 2020, President Donald Trump announced his intent to nominate Trujillo to be the next Assistant Secretary of State for Western Hemisphere Affairs and a member of the board of directors of the Inter-American Foundation. In July 2020, Trujillo participated in a hearing before the Senate Committee on Foreign Relations for his assistant secretary nomination. Consideration of his board membership nomination stalled in committee. On January 3, 2021, his nomination was returned to the President under Rule XXXI, Paragraph 6 of the United States Senate.

== History ==
Trujillo was born on Long Island in New York and moved to the state of Florida in 1988. He is of Cuban heritage as his parents immigrated to the US. He attended Spring Hill College, graduating with a degree in business administration in 2004, and then the Florida State University College of Law, receiving his Juris Doctor in 2007. Following graduation, he served as an assistant state attorney for the Eleventh Judicial Circuit Court of Florida, primarily dealing with felony prosecutions. He then started his own legal practice, Trujillo Vargas LLC which has now evolved to Trujillo Vargas Gonzalez Hevia LLP. He is now a Founding Partner of Continental PLLC, and President and Founder of Continental Strategy.

== Florida House of Representatives ==
When incumbent State Representative Marcelo Llorente was unable to seek re-election in 2010 due to term limits, Trujillo ran to succeed him in the 116th District, which included The Hammocks and Kendale Lakes, suburbs of Miami in central Miami-Dade County. He faced former State Representative Carlos Manrique, Francisco Amador, and Whilly Bermudez in the Republican primary, and he emerged narrowly victorious with 34% of the vote. Trujillo advanced to the general election, where he encountered only write-in opposition, winning with 97% of the vote.

In 2012, following the reconfiguration of state legislative districts, Trujillo ran for re-election in the 105th District, which contained territory that was radically different from what he had previously represented in the 116th District. Trujillo kept some of the precincts that he had represented in the Miami suburbs, and expanded to include vast amounts of rural Collier County and Miami-Dade County, stretching from Doral to Naples. He was challenged in the Republican primary by Paul Crespo, who presented a serious challenge. Trujillo racked up the endorsements of former Governor Jeb Bush and the Florida Chamber of Commerce, and ended up defeating Crespo with 56% of the vote. He advanced to the general election, where he once again encountered only write-in opposition, and won his second term with nearly 100% of the vote.

In February 2018, he voted against a motion to consider an assault weapon ban.

== United States ambassador to the OAS ==
In October 2017, Trujillo was chosen by President Donald Trump to serve as U.S. Ambassador to the Organization of American States. Trujillo was confirmed by the Senate by a voice vote on March 22, 2018, and resigned from the Florida House the following day. He presented his credentials to OAS Secretary General Luis Almagro on April 5.

Florida House of Representatives
Preceded by Marcelo Llorente	Member of the Florida House of Representatives from the 116th district 2010–2012	Succeeded by Jose Felix Diaz
Preceded by Joseph Gibbons	Member of the Florida House of Representatives from the 105th district 2012–2018	Succeeded by Ana Maria Rodriguez
Diplomatic posts
Preceded by Carmen Lomellin	United States Ambassador to the Organization of American States; 2018–2021	Succeeded by Francisco O. Mora
