= New York v. Deutsche Telekom =

2019 US court case

New York v. Deutsche Telekom was a lawsuit filed by nine states and Washington D.C. to block the merger of T-Mobile US and Sprint Corporation. The suit was filed by State Attorneys General from New York, California, Colorado, Connecticut, Washington D.C., Maryland, Michigan, Mississippi, Virginia, and Wisconsin. The case was led by New York Attorney General Letitia James, with Federal Southern District of New York Judge Victor Marrero presiding.

== Background ==
The case was filed while the US Department of Justice was in the process of approving the merger of Sprint Corporation and T-Mobile US. The states filed the merger due to concerns that the merger violated antitrust laws, being anti-competitive, would lessen the number of jobs available and would create higher pricing for consumers. NY AG stated, in connection with why the lawsuit was filed that:

When it comes to corporate power, bigger isn't always better. The T-Mobile and Sprint merger would not only cause irreparable harm to mobile subscribers nationwide by cutting access to affordable, reliable wireless service for millions of Americans, but would particularly affect lower-income and minority communities here in New York and in urban areas across the country. That's why we are going to court to stop this merger and protect our consumers, because this is exactly the sort of consumer-harming, job-killing megamerger our antitrust laws were designed to prevent.

The trial was initially set to begin on October 7, 2019.

The trial had many opponents initially, including the Department of Justice (DOJ) and the FCC. FCC Chairman Ajit Pai called the lawsuit "misguided" and stated, "And make no mistake about it, government officials trying to block this transaction are working to stop many upstate New Yorkers and other rural Americans from getting access to fast mobile broadband and all of the benefits that come with it."

After the DOJ delayed giving the documents of their settlement with T-Mobile and Sprint, the State AGs requested a delay of the start date of the trial. After consideration and hearing pre-trial arguments, the judge delayed the start of the trial to December 9, 2019. NY AG Letitia James stated once she reviewed the settlement documents between the DOJ and Sprint and T-Mobile that "Our case against T-Mobile is an antitrust violation, obviously we're concerned with anti-competitive behavior. So providing public benefits are good, but it does not address the antitrust violations."

Between the time of the announcement of the trial and the beginning of the trial, eight additional states entered the trial alongside the other State AGs: Pennsylvania, Hawaii, Illinois, Massachusetts, Minnesota, Nevada, Oregon, and Texas.

Before the trial began, the defendants entered settlement talks with all the state AGs involved in the case. Due to this, they successfully settled with the AGs of Mississippi, Colorado, Texas, and Nevada prior to the trial beginning. They also attempted to settle with each of the other State AGs, but these talks eventually fell through before the trial began, leaving 14 State AGs in the trial.

== Ruling ==
On February 11, 2020, District Judge Victor Marrero officially announced his decision to side with Sprint and T-Mobile, officially giving federal district court approval to the merger. He stated that "the merger is not likely to substantially lessen competition like the suing state AGs had claimed it would" and also that Sprint "does not have a sustainable long-term competitive strategy [to remain a viable competitor]."
