= Marcelo Llorente =

American politician

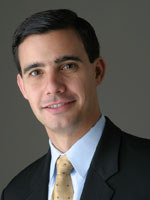

Member of the Florida House of Representatives from the 116th district
- In office November 5, 2002 – November 2, 2010
- Preceded by: Annie Betancourt
- Succeeded by: Carlos Trujillo

Personal details
- Born: March 7, 1977 (age 49) Miami, Florida, U.S.
- Party: Republican
- Spouse: Cristina Elena Suarez
- Children: Isabella, Marcelo
- Education: Tulane University (B.S.); Florida State University College of Law (J.D.)
- Occupation: Attorney

Marcelo Llorente (born March 7, 1977, in Miami, Florida) is an American politician who served as a Republican representative in the Florida House of Representatives from the 116th district from 2002 to 2010.

== Biography ==
He graduated from Belen Jesuit Preparatory School in 1994 and later received his bachelor's degree from Tulane University in 1998. In addition, he received his Juris Doctor from Florida State University in 2001. He is a member of the American Bar Association, the Florida Bar Association and the Cuban-American Bar Association.

He served as a Republican representative in the Florida House of Representatives from the 116th district from 2002 to 2010. He was 24 years old when elected, the third-youngest person elected to that body.

On June 17, 2009, Marcelo Llorente announced that he would be run for Mayor of Miami-Dade County in 2011. The special election took place in 2011, due to a recall of the current mayor. In a crowded field of 11 candidates vying for the office of the mayor; Llorente came in third place with 28,334 votes, or 14.83%, thereby missing the runoff.

== Personal life ==
He is married to Cristina Elena Suarez and they have three children Isabella, Marcelo Jr, and Nicolas.
