= List of ambassadors of the United States to the Organization of American States =

Permanent Representative of the United States to the Organization of American States
- Seal of the United States Department of State

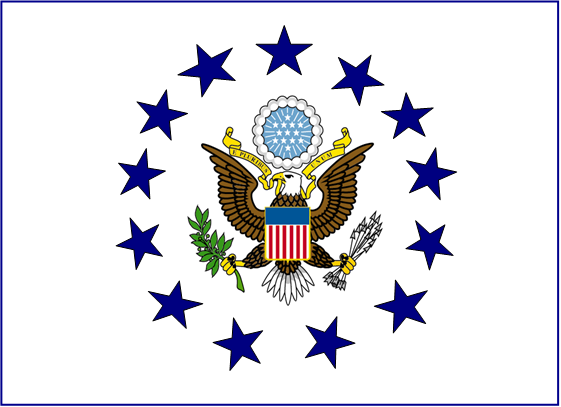
- Flag of a United States chief of mission

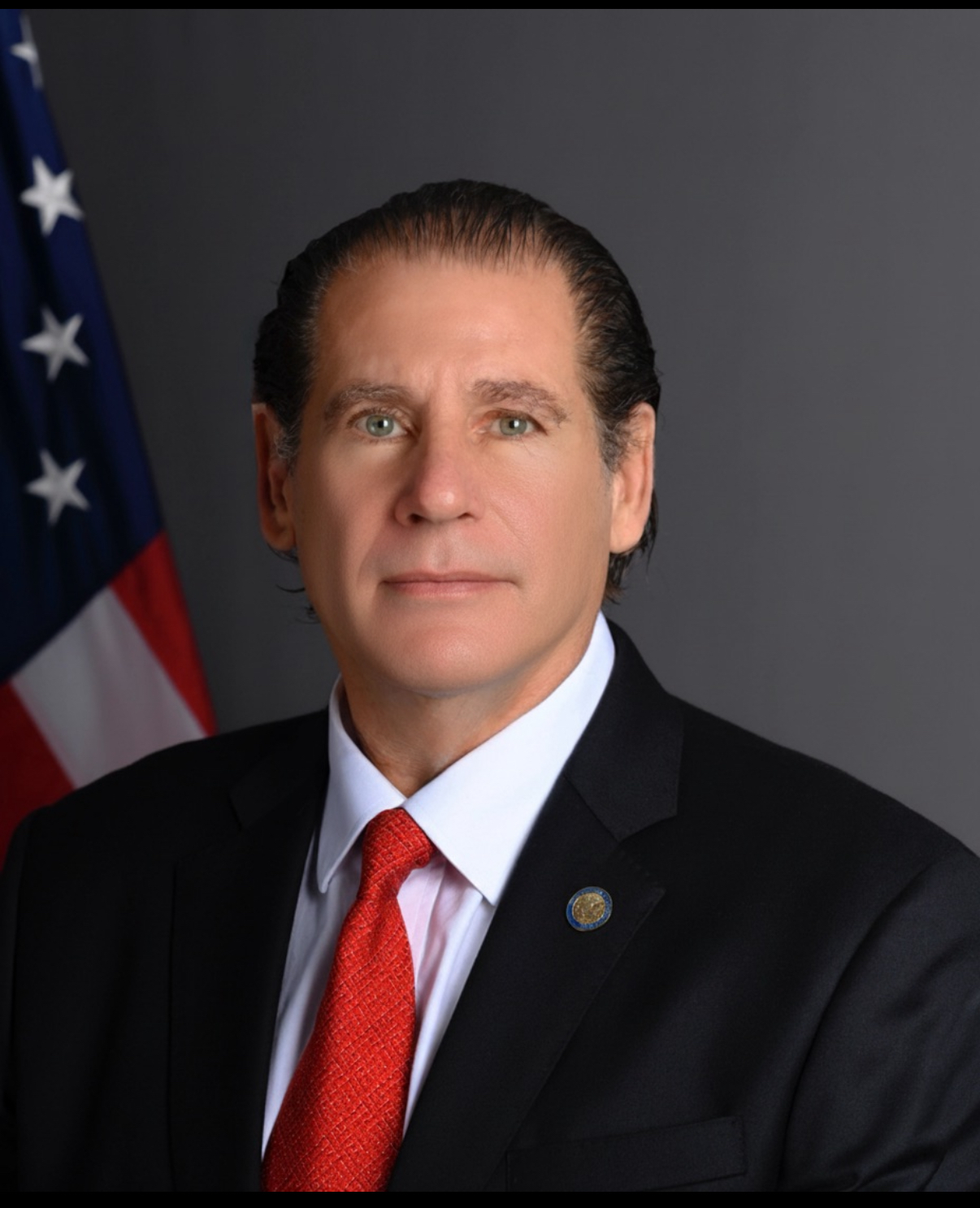
- Incumbent; Leandro Rizzuto Jr. since October 28, 2025
- Nominator: President of the United States
- Inaugural holder: William Dawson
- Formation: 1948
- Website: U.S. Mission – OAS

The following is a list of people who have served as United States Ambassador to the Organization of American States, or the full title, "United States Permanent Representative to the Organization of American States", with the rank and status of Ambassador Extraordinary and Plenipotentiary.

#	Name	Years served	OAS secretary(ies) general	U.S. president(s)
1	William Dawson	1948	Alberto Lleras Camargo	Harry S. Truman
2	Paul C. Daniels	1948–1951	Alberto Lleras Camargo	Harry S. Truman
3	John C. Dreier	1951–1960	Alberto Lleras Camargo	Harry S. Truman
3	John C. Dreier	1951–1960	Carlos Dávila	Dwight Eisenhower
3	John C. Dreier	1951–1960	José Antonio Mora	Dwight Eisenhower
4	deLesseps S. Morrison	1961–1963	José Antonio Mora	John F. Kennedy
5	Ellsworth Bunker	1964–1966	José Antonio Mora	Lyndon Johnson
6	Sol M. Linowitz	1966–1969	José Antonio Mora	Lyndon Johnson
6	Sol M. Linowitz	1966–1969	Galo Plaza	Lyndon Johnson
7	Joseph J. Jova	1969–1974	Galo Plaza	Richard Nixon
8	William S. Mailliard	1974–1977	Galo Plaza	Richard Nixon
8	William S. Mailliard	1974–1977	Alejandro Orfila	Gerald Ford
9	Gale W. McGee	1977–1981	Alejandro Orfila	Jimmy Carter
9	Gale W. McGee	1977–1981	Alejandro Orfila	Ronald Reagan
10	J. William Middendorf	1981–1985	Alejandro Orfila	Ronald Reagan
10	J. William Middendorf	1981–1985	João Clemente Baena Soares	Ronald Reagan
11	Richard Thomas McCormack	1985–1989	João Clemente Baena Soares	Ronald Reagan
12	Luigi R. Einaudi	1989–1993	João Clemente Baena Soares	George H. W. Bush
12	Luigi R. Einaudi	1989–1993	João Clemente Baena Soares	Bill Clinton
13	Harriet C. Babbitt	1993–1997	João Clemente Baena Soares	Bill Clinton
13	Harriet C. Babbitt	1993–1997	César Gaviria	Bill Clinton
14	Victor Marrero	1998-1999	César Gaviria	Bill Clinton
15	Luis J. Lauredo	2000–2001	César Gaviria	Bill Clinton
16	Roger Francisco Noriega	2001–2003	César Gaviria	George W. Bush
17	John F. Maisto	2003–2007	César Gaviria	George W. Bush
17	John F. Maisto	2003–2007	Miguel Ángel Rodríguez	George W. Bush
17	John F. Maisto	2003–2007	Luigi R. Einaudi (acting)	George W. Bush
17	John F. Maisto	2003–2007	José Miguel Insulza	George W. Bush
18	Hector Morales	2008–2009	José Miguel Insulza	George W. Bush
19	Carmen Lomellin	2009-2016	José Miguel Insulza	Barack Obama
19	Carmen Lomellin	2009-2016	Luis Almagro	Barack Obama
20	Carlos Trujillo	2018–2021	Luis Almagro	Donald Trump
21	Francisco O. Mora	2023–2025	Luis Almagro	Joe Biden
22	Leandro Rizzuto Jr.	2025–	Albert Ramdin	Donald Trump
