= Harriet C. Babbitt =

American government official (born 1947)

- Babbitt in 2005

13th United States Ambassador to the Organization of American States
- In office April 12, 1993 – November 30, 1997
- President: Bill Clinton
- Preceded by: Luigi R. Einaudi
- Succeeded by: Victor Marrero

Deputy Administrator of the United States Agency for International Development
- In office 1997–2001
- President: Bill Clinton; George W. Bush

First Lady of Arizona
- In role March 4, 1978 – January 6, 1987
- Governor: Bruce Babbitt
- Preceded by: Maureen Bolin
- Succeeded by: Florence Mecham

Personal details
- Born: November 13, 1947 (age 79) Charleston, West Virginia, U.S.
- Party: Democratic
- Spouse: Bruce Babbitt
- Children: Christopher; T.J.
- Education: Arizona State University College of Law (JD)
- Profession: Attorney; diplomat

Harriet "Hattie" Coons Babbitt (born November 13, 1947) is an attorney and former diplomat, who served as United States ambassador to the Organization of American States (OAS) from 1993 to 1997, as deputy administrator of the United States Agency for International Development (USAID) from 1997 to 2001, and served as the first lady of Arizona from 1978 to 1987 as the wife of Governor Bruce Babbitt. She has practiced law in both Arizona and Washington, D.C. Before commencing the practice of law, she clerked for the then chief justice of the Arizona Supreme Court Jack D.H. Hayes from 1972 to 1973.

== Non-profit work/academia ==
Broadly active in diverse areas of the non-profit field, Babbitt currently serves as vice chair of the National Democratic Institute for International Affairs, and previously served on the organization's Board of Directors from 1988 to 1993. She also serves on the Advisory Board of the Institute for the Study of Diplomacy (ISD) at the Georgetown University School of Foreign Service. She served as Vice Chair of the board of the World Resources Institute (WRI), as Chair of the Board of Population International (PAI), and as the Vice Chair of the Executive Board to the American Bar Association Central European and Eurasian Legal Initiative (ABA-CEELI). In addition, she served as a Senate-confirmed member of the board of directors of the Inter-American Foundation from 1993-1997. Babbitt served as a lay member of the Liaison Committee on Medical Education (LCME accredits medical schools in the United States) and served as a Senior Public Policy Scholar at the Woodrow Wilson International Center for Scholars in Washington, DC.

Babbitt has a long record in support of democracy and human rights. She has been a member of numerous international delegations to prepare for and observe elections around the world, including those organized by the Carter Center, by the National Democratic Institute, and by the United Nations, where she served as a U.S. member state representative to the United Nations mission to monitor the Angolan election (UNAVEM II) in 1992. In 2009, Babbitt led President Obama’s delegation to Timor-Leste’s 10-year celebration of its UN-supervised referendum in favor of independence from Indonesia.

Ambassador Babbitt is a life member of the Council on Foreign Relations.

== Personal life ==
Hattie Coons was born in Charleston, West Virginia, and subsequently moved to Brownsville, Texas, where she graduated from Brownsville High School in 1965. She graduated from Arizona State University with a B.A. in Spanish in 1969, and a J.D. in 1972.

While a student at ASU in 1968, she married Bruce Babbitt, who served as Governor of Arizona from 1978 to 1987, and as United States Secretary of the Interior in the Cabinet of President Bill Clinton from 1993 to 2001. They have two sons, Christopher and T.J.

A train line temporarily serving the Phoenix metropolitan area was named for her. After a series of floods in February 1980 damaged many bridges crossing the Salt River, traffic was in a state of gridlock. In response, a temporary commuter train line was started between the cities of Phoenix, Tempe, and Mesa, using existing freight track and Amtrak trains. The train line was named the "Hattie B." in honor of the governor and first lady's involvement. The line was cancelled as soon as bridges were restored, but it was credited with creating more interest in public transit for the Phoenix area.
