= Otto Reich =

American diplomat and lobbyist

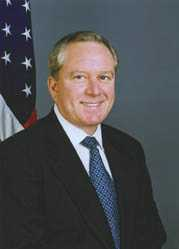

United States Ambassador to Venezuela
- In office June 6, 1986 – July 17, 1989
- President: Ronald Reagan; George H. W. Bush
- Preceded by: George W. Landau
- Succeeded by: Kenneth N. Skoug Jr.

28th Assistant Secretary of State for Western Hemisphere Affairs
- In office January 11, 2002 – July 22, 2004
- Preceded by: Peter F. Romero
- Succeeded by: Roger Noriega

Personal details
- Born: October 16, 1945 Havana, Cuba
- Party: Republican
- Profession: Diplomat, Lawyer

Otto Juan Reich (born October 16, 1945) is an American diplomat and lobbyist who worked in the administrations of Presidents Ronald Reagan, George H. W. Bush, and George W. Bush. Reich was born in Cuba; his family moved to North Carolina when he was fifteen. He graduated from University of North Carolina in 1966, and after a two-year stint in the US Army, received a master's degree from Georgetown University in 1973. After graduating, Reich worked for the state and federal governments in Florida and Washington, D.C.

In 1983 Reich began leading the Office of Public Diplomacy (OPD), which he helped establish. The OPD sought to promote the Contra guerillas in Nicaragua, through techniques described by the Comptroller General in 1987 as "prohibited, covert propaganda". Reich, described as "chief spinner" of the effort by journalist Ann Bardach, was not accused of illegal activity. The OPD was shut down after the Iran-Contra affair in 1987. Reich served as the Ambassador to Venezuela from 1986 to 1989, and subsequently worked as a corporate lobbyist for twelve years.

Reich was nominated by George W. Bush to be Assistant Secretary of State for Western Hemisphere Affairs in 2001. The Senate did not allow confirmation hearings, citing Reich's role in the Iran-Contra affair, and his advocacy as ambassador for Orlando Bosch, then imprisoned in Venezuela on suspicion of bombing Cubana de Aviación Flight 455. Bush made a recess appointment, allowing Reich to hold the position for one year without confirmation. He was subsequently appointed special envoy to Latin America. He resigned from the Bush administration in 2004, and has since run a consulting firm and advised Republican presidential candidates.

== Early life and education ==
Otto Reich was born in Cuba to an Austrian Jewish father and a Cuban Catholic mother. His father, who fled Nazi Germany in 1938, traveled to Cuba with the intention of continuing on to the United States. In Havana, he met and married a Cuban woman, and began selling furniture. By 1945, most of his father's family had been killed in the Holocaust. According to The New York Times, his father's experiences in Nazi Germany made the elder Reich "immediately suspicious of [Fidel] Castro, prompting him to flee with his family to North Carolina in 1960, when Otto was 15."

In 1966, Reich received a B.A. in International Studies from the University of North Carolina at Chapel Hill. He then spent three years in the US Army, from 1966 to 1969, as an officer in the 3rd Civil Affairs Detachment stationed in the Panama Canal Zone. He received an Master's degree in Latin American Studies from Georgetown University in 1973.

== Career ==
After receiving his master's degree, Reich began working as an international representative for the Florida Department of Commerce, the first position he held in government. He also worked as a staff assistant in the U.S. House of Representatives, as a Community Development Coordinator for the City of Miami, and later as a Director of the Council of the Americas. Reich was Assistant Administrator of the US Agency for International Development in charge of US economic assistance to Latin America and the Caribbean between 1981 and 1983. This position was the first he held under the administration of Ronald Reagan.

=== Office of Public Diplomacy ===
From 1983 to 1986, Reich established and managed the inter-agency Office of Public Diplomacy for Latin America and the Caribbean (OPD), which sought to promote the Contra guerrillas in Nicaragua. Reich managed a staff including officials from the Central Intelligence Agency (CIA) and The Pentagon, some of whom were personnel trained in psychological warfare. Reich reported to Oliver North, who then worked at the National Security Council, although the office itself was under the State Department.

The OPD sent false information to the US media, such as a claim that the Nicaraguan government was involved with drug trafficking. It also wrote opinion pieces in mainstream US newspapers, attributed to fictitious Nicaraguan rebel leaders, attacking opponents of Reagan's foreign policy. While heading this office, Reich also once demanded a meeting with staff of the National Public Radio (NPR), after NPR reported on a massacre of civilians carried out by the Contras, and warned the staff that their reports were being monitored. Reich also confronted journalists at CBS News in April 1984 after the network aired a documentary about El Salvador that, according to Reich's superior George Shultz, favored the country's guerrillas over the US and Salvadoran governments.

Reich's position drew him into the Iran-Contra affair. A House Foreign Affairs Committee report characterized the OPD as a "domestic political and propaganda operation", while the Comptroller General of the United States described the office as having engaged in "engaged in prohibited, covert propaganda activities." A 1987 Congressional committee investigating the Iran-Contra affair stated that the OPD had encouraged "′white propaganda′: pro-Contra newspaper articles by paid consultants who did not disclose their connection to the Administration." A senior U.S. official described its activities as "a huge psychological operation of the kind the military conducts in denied or enemy territory." The Comptroller General also determined that the OPD violated rules placed on the State Department's use of funds.

The OPD was shut down in 1987 after the investigation. Reich himself, described as the "chief spinner" of the Iran-Contra effort by journalist Ann Bardach, was not accused of illegal activity. Reich said that the Comptroller General report was flawed and called the investigation into Iran-Contra an "inquisition." The operation involving op-eds, described in a declassified memorandum from one of Reich's subordinates to Patrick Buchanan, then the communications director for the Reagan White House, was also denied by a spokesperson for Reich.

=== Ambassadorship and lobbying career ===
Reich served as the US ambassador to Venezuela between 1986 and 1989. In that position he lobbied the US government to press for the release of Orlando Bosch, a Cuban exile militant then being held in Venezuela under suspicion of organizing the bombing of Cubana de Aviación Flight 455. Reich argued both that Bosch was innocent, and that his safety was threatened. After Bosch's acquittal and release in 1986, Reich asked his superiors on multiple occasions for permission to grant Bosch a visa, but was denied. Reich subsequently denied taking a special interest in Bosch's situation. In 1989, Reich received the State Department's "Exemplary Service Award". Reich maintained good relations with the government of Jaime Lusinchi, and received the Order of the Liberator, Venezuela's highest honor, from him.

From 1989 to 2001, Reich worked as a corporate lobbyist. In 2001, he was President of RMA International, a lobbying and consulting company. In this role, he helped the rum company Bacardi, which wanted to revoke Cuba's trademark protection, so that it could use a familiar Cuban rum brand name, "Havana Club". Bacardi's efforts met success with the passage of the Helms–Burton Act in 1996, which tightened the US embargo against Cuba, and stripped trademark protection from the brand name. Reich helped author the act. Reich was also involved with an effort by Lockheed-Martin to sell F-16 jet fighters to Chile, which would have been the first time in twenty years that advanced weapons had been sold by the US to Latin American countries. In 1991 and 1992, at the request of President George H. W. Bush, Reich also served as Deputy US Representative to the United Nations Commission on Human Rights in Geneva. Reich was co-host of CNN International's Choque de Opiniones, a Spanish-language version of CNN's Crossfire, on which he represented the right-wing position.

=== Assistant secretary of state ===
In 2001, President George W. Bush nominated Reich to be Assistant Secretary of State for Western Hemisphere Affairs, the top State Department post for Latin America. The nomination was supported by his brother, Jeb Bush, then the Governor of Florida. The Senate, however, did not allow confirmation hearings, and the appointment resulted in controversy. Opponents to Reich's nomination cited his advocacy as ambassador to Venezuela for Bosch, and his role in the Iran-Contra scandal. Bosch was described as a terrorist by the Federal Bureau of Investigation and the United States Attorney General. After the nomination process had lasted for nearly a year, Bush made a recess appointment, allowing Reich to remain in office for a year without being confirmed by the Senate. Reich was sworn in on January 11, 2002.

Reich held the post of Assistant Secretary of State for Western Hemisphere Affairs at the time of the Venezuelan coup d'état on April 11, 2002, that briefly overthrew President Hugo Chávez. During the coup, Reich spoke to coup leader Pedro Carmona Estanga, who replaced Chávez as president, and urged him not to shut down the National Assembly. Reich also spoke to ambassadors of other Latin American countries hours after the coup, telling that Chávez had resigned, and asked them to support the new government. Carmona nonetheless dissolved both the Assembly and the Supreme Court, leading to a popular uprising that toppled the coup government and returned Chávez to the presidency. After Chávez was returned to power, the US supported a resolution issued by the Organization of American States condemning the coup: however, a perception remained among Latin American countries that the US had played a role in it, and led to concerns over Reich's appointment.

=== Later career ===
Reich's year-long term as Assistant Secretary of State was ended in December 2002. Reich was replaced at the State Department by Roger Noriega, and became special envoy to Latin America, which was a position that did not require confirmation by the Senate. Reich resigned from the Bush administration in June 2004, citing "personal and financial reasons."

During the 2008 US presidential election, Reich served as an adviser on Latin America to John McCain. During the 2012 US presidential election, Reich was a spokesman for the Mitt Romney campaign. Reich also served as a foreign policy advisor to Jeb Bush during the latter's 2016 presidential campaign. As of 2020, Reich runs a Washington, DC–based business consultancy, Otto Reich & Associates. In 2001, Reich was also vice-chairman of Worldwide Responsible Apparel Production.

== Political positions and reputation ==
A 2002 profile of Reich in The New York Times described him as a "minor celebrity" in Latin America, stating that editorial cartoons in Nicaragua had depicted him "as a Superman-like figure capable of terrorizing corrupt officials and the nation's former Marxist leaders." Cuban media outlets, in contrast, referred to him as a "terrorist" and a "mafioso". His much-debated links to Bosch, his support of the Contras, and his lobbying activities, generated controversy, particularly during his nomination for Assistant Secretary for State. At the time of his nomination, he received considerable support from right-wing Spanish-language radio shows in Miami, and from Cuban-American organizations in general. While he was an advisor to Jeb Bush's presidential campaign, he expressed support for the invasion of Iraq in 2003 led by the US. He has been described as a right-winger, and a person with strong opinions, and called himself an anti-communist. In 2006 he praised the former dictator of Chile, Augusto Pinochet, as having "saved Chilean democracy from communist takeover".

== Sources ==
- Bardach, Ann Louise (2002). Cuba Confidential: Love and Vengeance in Miami and Havana. Random House. ISBN 978-0-375-50489-1.
- Hamilton, Lee H.; Inouye, Daniel K. (1987). Report of the Congressional Committees Investigating the Iran/Contra Affair. DIANE Publishing. ISBN 978-0-7881-2602-4.

Diplomatic posts
Preceded by George W. Landau	United States Ambassador to Venezuela; 1986–1989	Succeeded by Kenneth N. Skoug Jr.
Government offices
Preceded by Peter F. Romero	Assistant Secretary of State for Western Hemisphere Affairs; January 11, 2002 – November 22, 2002	Succeeded by Roger Noriega
