= Andrew L. Carter Jr. =

American judge (born 1969)

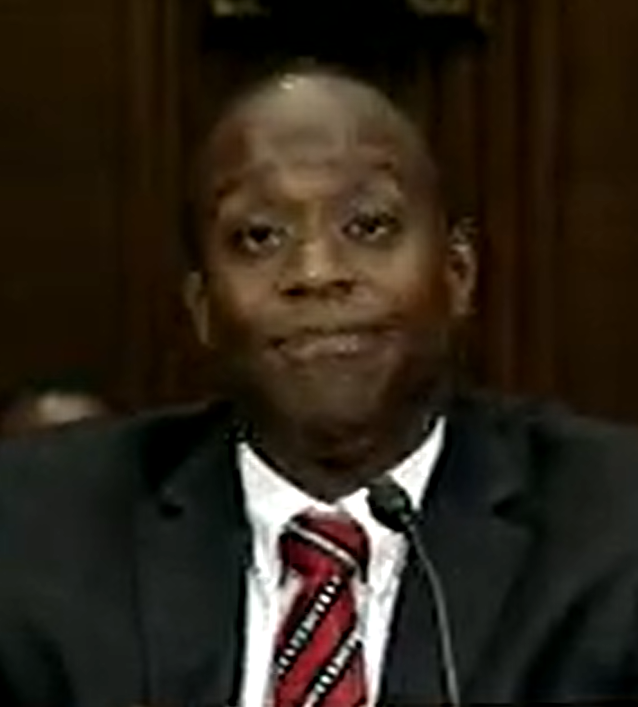

Judge of the United States District Court for the Southern District of New York
- Incumbent
- Assumed office December 8, 2011
- Appointed by: Barack Obama
- Preceded by: Victor Marrero

Magistrate Judge of the United States District Court for the Eastern District of New York
- In office 2009 – December 8, 2011

Personal details
- Born: January 12, 1969 (age 57) Albany, Georgia, U.S.
- Education: University of Texas at Austin (BA); Harvard University (JD)

Andrew Lamar Carter Jr. (born January 12, 1969) is an American lawyer serving as a United States district judge of the United States District Court for the Southern District of New York. He served as a United States magistrate judge of the United States District Court for the Eastern District of New York from 2009 to 2011.

== Early life and education ==
Born in Albany, Georgia, Carter received his Bachelor of Arts from the University of Texas at Austin in 1991 and his Juris Doctor in 1994 from Harvard Law School.

== Career ==
Carter was a program assistant at the Ford Foundation from 1994 to 1996. From 1996 until 2005, he was an attorney at the Legal Aid Society, working in the Federal Defender Division from 2000 to 2005 and in the Criminal Defense Division from 1996 to 2000. From 2005 to 2009 Carter worked for the Federal Defenders of New York.

=== Federal judicial service ===
In 2009, Carter was appointed a United States magistrate judge of the United States District Court for the Eastern District of New York. He remained in the post until taking up his lifetime appointment in the Southern District in 2011. Carter was recommended for an Article III judgeship by Senator Chuck Schumer of New York. On May 19, 2011, President Barack Obama nominated Carter to fill a seat on the Southern District of New York that was vacated by Judge Victor Marrero, who assumed senior status on December 31, 2010. On September 15, 2011, the Senate Judiciary Committee reported his nomination to the Senate floor by voice vote. The Senate confirmed his nomination on December 5, 2011, by voice vote. He received his commission on December 8, 2011.

=== Notable cases ===
Carter has presided over several high-profile cases, including the corruption trial of Norman Seabrook and a breach of contract/copyright infringement trial involving the rapper Jay-Z. In September 2024, Carter would be the second judge to deny bail to Sean "Diddy" Combs.

== See also ==
- List of African-American federal judges
- List of African-American jurists

Legal offices
| Preceded by Victor Marrero | Judge of the United States District Court for the Southern District of New York; 2011–present | Incumbent |
