= Peter F. Romero =

American diplomat

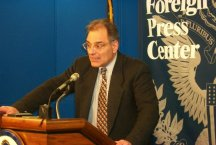

United States Ambassador to Ecuador
- In office November 16, 1993 – July 25, 1996
- President: Bill Clinton
- Preceded by: James F. Mack
- Succeeded by: Leslie M. Alexander

27th Assistant Secretary of State for Western Hemisphere Affairs
- In office January 4, 2001 – June 4, 2001
- Preceded by: Jeffrey Davidow
- Succeeded by: Otto Reich

Personal details
- Born: New York City, U.S.
- Profession: Diplomat; Consultant

Peter F. Romero previously served as the United States Ambassador to Ecuador and as Assistant Secretary of State for Western Hemisphere Affairs. He was confirmed by the U.S. Senate and was appointed by President Bill Clinton in the Fall of 1993.

Romero joined the Foreign Service in 1977 and spent 24 years in the United States Department of State. He received both his bachelor's and master's degrees in international relations from Florida State University. He currently hosts the American Diplomat podcast.

Government offices
Preceded by Jeffrey Davidow	Assistant Secretary of State for Western Hemisphere Affairs; January 4, 2001 – June 4, 2001	Succeeded by Otto Reich
Diplomatic posts
Preceded by James F. Mack (as Chargé d'affaires)	United States Ambassador to Ecuador; 1993–1996	Succeeded by Leslie M. Alexander
