= James Donald Walsh =

American diplomat (born 1946)

46th United States Ambassador to Argentina
- In office June 14, 2000 – May 21, 2003
- President: George W. Bush
- Preceded by: James Richard Cheek
- Succeeded by: Lino Gutierrez

Personal details
- Born: August 9, 1946 (age 79) Scranton, Pennsylvania, U.S.
- Education: University of Scranton; Syracuse University
- Profession: Diplomat

James Donald Walsh (born August 9, 1946) is an American diplomat and foreign service officer.

Walsh served as the United States Ambassador to Argentina from his appointment on June 14, 2000, until he left the post on May 21, 2003.

Walsh was born on August 9, 1946, in Scranton, Pennsylvania, where he was also raised. He graduated from Scranton Preparatory School, received his bachelor's degree from the University of Scranton, and a master's degree from the Maxwell School of Citizenship and Public Affairs at Syracuse University.

Diplomatic posts
Preceded by Hassan Nemazee	United States Ambassador to Argentina; 2000–2003	Succeeded by Lino Gutierrez
