= Office of Public Diplomacy =

The Office of Public Diplomacy for Latin America and the Caribbean (S/LPD or ARA/LPD) was an intra-agency propaganda organization established in the United States during the administration of Ronald Reagan. It was founded and managed by the Cuban-American Otto Reich, an ardent opponent of Fidel Castro.

In theory, the S/LPD operated under the auspices of the Department of State, but congressional investigations later determined it reported directly to Reagan's National Security Council aide in the White House, Colonel Oliver North. The S/LPD collaborated with Central Intelligence Agency propaganda experts and Army psychological operations specialists to disseminate what it called "white propaganda" with the goal of influencing public opinion and spurring Congress to continue to fund the Reagan administration's military campaign against Nicaragua's Sandinista government. By covertly disseminating intelligence leaks to journalists, it sought to trump up a Nicaraguan "threat," and to sanctify the U.S.-backed Contra guerrillas fighting Nicaragua's government as "freedom fighters."

The S/LPD drafted pro-Reagan op-ed pieces that ran under fabricated bylines in U.S. newspapers. It also planted stories designed to embarrass or contradict the Sandinista regime. In addition to manipulating the press, the S/LPD also supplied information to pro-Reagan lobbying groups and political organizations that favored the Contra war.

On the eve of Reagan's re-election, the S/LPD spread the story that Soviet MiG fighter jets were arriving in Nicaragua. With journalists citing unnamed "intelligence sources", the story was repeated throughout the U.S. media and spurred a Democratic senator to discuss a possible airstrike against Nicaragua. However, the story later turned out to be a hoax. Several journalists later acknowledged they had been handed the story by Reich's office. According to the Miami Herald, the S/LPD also spread a rumor that Nicaragua had acquired chemical weapons from the Soviets. Newsweek reported that it told reporters that high-level Sandinistas were involved in drug trafficking, but US drug officials said there was no evidence for such a charge.

In a March 13, 1985 "Eyes Only" memo to Pat Buchanan, then-White House Communications Director, the S/LPD bragged about the recent results of its "White Propaganda" operation in support of the Contras. The S/LPD said it helped write an anti-Sandinista column for the Wall Street Journal that had run two days earlier; assisted in a "positive piece" on the Contras by Fred Francis that aired the night before on NBC; wrote op-eds for the Washington Post and New York Times that would run with the bylines of Contra leaders; arranged an extensive media tour for a Contra leader "through a cut-out" (to hide the S/LPD's role); and prepared to leak a State Department cable that would embarrass the Sandinistas: "Do not be surprised if this cable somehow hits the evening news."

The memo said that the Wall Street Journal column, "Nicaragua is Armed for Trouble", was written by an S/LPD "consultant", but cautioned that "officially, this office had no role in its preparation." Weeks later, after the Journal published a news report on Nicaragua that Reich disliked, the S/LPD chief wrote an angry letter-to-the editor touting the "Armed for Trouble" column and complaining that the news report was "an echo of Sandinista propaganda." It was an audacious charge since Reich himself was "echoing" propaganda his office had covertly boasted to have assisted in.

Besides media manipulation through planted stories and leaks, the S/LPD was also accused of cajoling and bullying. Reich visited CBS in April 1984 to complain at length about its Central America coverage. In a memo to President Reagan, Secretary of State George P. Shultz described the meeting as an example of "what the Office of Public Diplomacy has been doing to help improve the quality of information the American people are receiving. It has been repeated dozens of times over the past few months."

Six months later, Reich met with a dozen National Public Radio reporters and editors about their allegedly biased Nicaragua coverage. According to NPR Foreign Affairs correspondent Bill Buzenberg, "Reich bragged that he had made similar visits to other unnamed newspapers and major television networks... Reich said he had gotten others to change some of their reporters in the field." Buzenberg told me in a 1987 interview that he viewed the S/LPD chief's comments as a "calculated attempt to intimidate."

In the summer of 1985, it helped circulate a specious story suggesting that US reporters received sexual favors from Sandinista-provided prostitutes in return for favorable coverage. "It isn't only women", Reich told New York magazine; for gay journalists, they would procure men.

The S/LPD was declared illegal after an investigation by the Comptroller General, who wrote in an October 30, 1987 report that the S/LPD engaged in "prohibited, covert propaganda activities, beyond the range of acceptable agency public information activities". The S/LPD also violated "a restriction on the State Department's annual appropriations prohibiting the use of federal funds for publicity or propaganda purposes not authorized by Congress." A senior U.S. official described its activities as "a huge psychological operation of the kind the military conducts in denied or enemy territory."

The program was largely exposed by the reporting of Alfonso Chardy at The Miami Herald.

== See also ==
- Office of Special Plans
