= Roger Noriega =

American diplomat

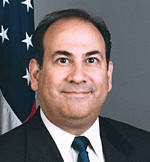

29th Assistant Secretary of State for Western Hemisphere Affairs
- In office July 31, 2004 – October 6, 2005
- President: George W. Bush
- Preceded by: Otto Reich
- Succeeded by: Tom Shannon

16th United States Ambassador to the Organization of American States
- In office August 6, 2001 – July 31, 2003
- President: George W. Bush
- Preceded by: Luis J. Lauredo
- Succeeded by: John Maisto

Personal details
- Born: 1959 (age 66–67) Wichita, Kansas, U.S.
- Education: Washburn University (BA)

Roger Francisco Noriega (born 1959, Wichita, Kansas) is an American diplomat who served as Assistant Secretary of State for Western Hemisphere Affairs in the George W. Bush administration. He is a visiting fellow at the American Enterprise Institute.

== Background ==
Born in Wichita, Kansas, he attended Washburn University in Topeka where he received a Bachelor of Arts degree in 1982.

== Career ==
Noriega has been involved in Latin American policy since the 1980s, when he worked in the Ronald Reagan administration's U.S. Agency for International Development. According to The Texas Observer, while at USAID, Noriega "oversaw 'non-lethal aid' to the Contras," which led to questions about Noriega's work during investigations into the Iran–Contra affair.

Noriega served as the Senior Policy Advisor and Alternate U.S. Representative at the U.S. Mission to the Organization of American States (OAS) from 1990 through 1993, and as Senior Advisor for Public Information at the OAS from 1993 to 1994.

From 1994 to 1997, Noriega returned to Capitol Hill as a senior staff member Congressman Benjamin Gilman for the House Committee on International Relations. Subsequently, he became a senior staff member of Senator Jesse Helms (R-NC). In 1996, Noriega co-authored the Helms–Burton Act, which tightened the United States embargo against Cuba.

Other tours of duty in the Department of State have been with the United States Agency for International Development (USAID) and the Bureaus for Inter-American Affairs and Public Affairs, where he was a Program Officer from 1987 through 1990 and a Senior Writer/Editor from 1986 until 1987. Prior to that, he served as Press Secretary and Legislative Assistant for Congressman Bob Whittaker (R-Kan.), U.S. House of Representatives, from 1983 until 1986. President Bush also appointed Noriega to the board of directors of the Inter-American Foundation.

Noriega served as U.S. Permanent Representative to the Organization of American States (OAS) from 2001 to 2003.

=== Foreign affairs ===
As Assistant Secretary of State for Western Hemisphere Affairs under President George W. Bush, Ambassador Noriega was responsible for managing U.S. foreign policy and promoting U.S. interests in the region. Noriega was a major force behind the Bush administration's policy towards Cuba and Venezuela. In 1996, Noriega co-authored the Helms-Burton law which tightened the 40-year-old embargo on Cuba. In April 2002, Noriega was Ambassador to the Organization of American States during the temporary ouster of Venezuelan president Hugo Chávez. Noriega resigned from the State Department in 2005 amid criticism from Senior State Department officials aiming to ease tensions between the U.S. and Venezuela to join the private sector.

=== Private career ===
Upon entering the private sector as a lobbyist in 2005, Noriega went to work for Miami-based law firm Tew Cardenas LLP, which, according to LD-2 reports filed in the second quarter of 2004, was actively lobbying for the interests of free-market proponent organizations in Haiti. At the time of Posada Carriles' reported presence in the U.S. in 2005, Noriega stated that the United States government was not then aware of his presence, saying that the controversy over his presence in the country, "may be a completely manufactured issue," and that Posada "might not have been in the United States."

Since leaving the State Department, he has lobbied U.S. representatives to support Venezuelan opposition leaders such as Leopoldo Lopez and María Corina Machado. Notable clients represented by Noriega include multi-billion dollar global hedge fund Elliott Management Corp, which Noriega assisted through "federal advocacy on behalf of US investors in Latin America", and political interest group Moroccan American Center for Policy, providing assistance and support for the settlement of Western Sahara issue. In 2008, Noriega partnered with Venezuelan exile and former PDVSA & IMF employee Martin Rodil to form a private risk assessment and lobbying firm called Vision Americas, through which, in 2009, he was hired as a U.S. lobbyist by an organization of the private sector of Honduras during the 2009 Honduran coup d'état when President Manuel Zelaya was ousted. According to the disclosure form, Noriega and Vision Americas were hired to "Support the efforts of the Honduran private sector to help consolidate the democratic transition in their country". Noriega had previously claimed that the democratically elected Zelaya posed a threat to the region because Honduras was ground zero in what he described as "the continued spread of Chavista authoritarianism under the guise of democracy". Other lobbying activities conducted by Roger Noriega through Vision Americas include a $25,000 contract in 2010 with Venezuelan firm Alodiga, claiming to "support the client's registration and regulatory issues", and a $45,000 contract in 2016 with the Haitian branch of global industrial, financial, supply chain, and telecommunications giant GB Group, owned by billionaire opportunist and prospector Gilbert Bigio which specified an initiative related to "educating U.S. stakeholders about the economic opportunities of a modern port system in Haiti".

Noriega signed the Madrid Charter, a document drafted by the conservative Spanish political party Vox that describes left-wing groups as enemies of Ibero-America involved in a "criminal project" that are "under the umbrella of the Cuban regime".

Government offices
Preceded by Luis J. Lauredo	United States Ambassador to the Organization of American States; August 6, 2001 – July 31, 2003	Succeeded by John Maisto
Preceded by Otto Reich	Assistant Secretary of State for Western Hemisphere Affairs; July 31, 2004 – October 6, 2005	Succeeded by Tom Shannon
