= First ladies and gentlemen of Arizona =

Title of the spouse of the governor of Arizona

First Gentleman of Arizona
- Seal of Arizona
- Current; Patrick Goodman since January 2, 2023
- Style: Mr. Goodman; Mr. First Gentleman
- Residence: No official residence
- Inaugural holder: Sarah Brown Kellog (as first lady); Terry Hull (as first gentleman)
- Formation: February 14, 1912 (114 years ago)

First lady or first gentleman of Arizona is the title attributed to the wife or husband of the governor of Arizona. There is no official residence in which the governor and their first reside while serving.

The current first gentleman of Arizona is Patrick Goodman, husband of Governor Katie Hobbs, who has held the position since January 2, 2023. To date, only two other people have served as the first gentleman of Arizona since statehood: Terry Hull 1997 to 2003 and John Brewer 2009 to 2015.

== List of first ladies and gentlemen of Arizona ==
First Lady/Gentleman	Term begins	Term ends	Governor	Notes
Vera Williams	January 2, 1967	January 6, 1975	Jack Williams	
Patricia Castro	January 6, 1975	October 20, 1977	Raúl Héctor Castro	
Marion Knappenberger Bolin	October 20, 1977	March 4, 1978	Wesley Bolin	
Harriet C. Babbitt	March 4, 1978	January 5, 1987	Bruce Babbitt	
Florence Mecham	January 5, 1987	April 4, 1988	Evan Mecham	
Vacant	April 4, 1988	March 6, 1991	Rose Mofford	Governor Mofford was a divorcee when she assumed office and never remarried.
Ann Symington	March 6, 1991	September 5, 1997	Fife Symington	
Terry Hull	September 5, 1997	January 6, 2003	Jane Dee Hull	The first man to serve as first gentleman of Arizona.
Vacant	January 6, 2003	January 20, 2009	Janet Napolitano	Governor Napolitano has never been married.
John Brewer	January 20, 2009	January 5, 2015	Jan Brewer	The second man to serve as first gentleman of Arizona.
Angela Ducey	January 5, 2015	January 2, 2023	Doug Ducey	
Patrick Goodman	January 2, 2023	Current	Katie Hobbs	

== See also ==
- List of governors of Arizona
