= Carmen Lomellin =

American diplomat

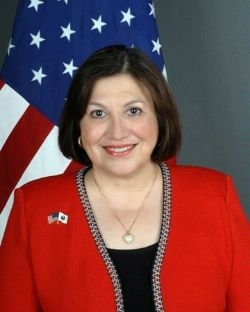

19th United States Ambassador to the Organization of American States
- In office November 23, 2009 – December 2016
- President: Barack Obama
- Preceded by: Hector Morales
- Succeeded by: Carlos Trujillo

Personal details
- Born: 1950 (age 75–76)
- Education: Calumet College of St. Joseph (BA); DePaul University (MBA)

Carmen Lomellin (born 1950) is an American diplomat of Mexican heritage from East Chicago, Indiana. Lomellin served as United States Ambassador to the Organization of American States from 2009 to 2016.

== Biography ==
Lomellin was appointed in May, 1998 to the position as executive secretary of the Inter-American Commission of Women (CIM) for the Organization of American States (OAS) by Secretary General Cesar Gaviria. She served as CIM executive secretary until March 2009. In that position, she provided guidance and direction to the OAS member states and permanent secretariat on hemispheric policy advancing issues affecting women, particularly in the areas of human rights and gender equality. As head of the CIM permanent secretariat, Lomellin oversaw the activities of the commission's delegates representing the 34 democracies of the Western Hemisphere and managed the daily operations of the permanent secretariat. She most recently served as director for outreach within the OAS Department of External Relations.

During the Clinton Administration, Lomellin held the positions of White House Liaison for the U.S. Office of Personnel Management and director of that agency's Office of International Affairs. She was an advisor on Hispanic Affairs to the White House Office for Women's Initiatives and Outreach, as well as search manager in the White House Office of Presidential Personnel during the 1996 presidential transition, where she worked on sub-cabinet appointments in the area of international trade.

Lomellin has experience in local government (Chicago, Illinois). She worked for Mayor Richard M. Daley as director of the Private Industry Council of Chicago and also implemented and managed one of the nation's most successful graffiti abatement programs. Ambassador Lomellin has worked for the Mexican American Legal Defense and Educational Fund, where she was the director of leadership development, and for Chicago United, a civic think tank, as director of economic development. In addition, she has extensive experience in the private sector, working for the Chicago-based Inland Steel Company in various sales and marketing capacities.

Lomellin holds a Bachelor of Science degree in business management from Calumet College of St. Joseph and a Master of Business Administration in international business from DePaul University, Chicago, Illinois. Lomellin has spent a major part of her professional career and personal life working on women's issues, particularly those in the United States Hispanic community.

Diplomatic posts
Preceded by Hector Morales	United States Ambassador to the Organization of American States; 2009–2014	Succeeded by Carlos Trujillo
