= John Maisto =

American diplomat (born 1938)

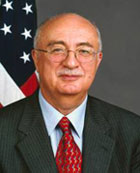

United States Ambassador to Nicaragua
- In office September 8, 1993 – November 15, 1996
- President: Bill Clinton
- Preceded by: Harry W. Shlaudeman
- Succeeded by: Lino Gutierrez

United States Ambassador to Venezuela
- In office March 21, 1997 – August 7, 2000
- President: Bill Clinton
- Preceded by: Jeffrey Davidow
- Succeeded by: Donna Hrinak

17th United States Ambassador to the Organization of American States
- In office July 31, 2003 – March 15, 2007
- President: George W. Bush
- Preceded by: Roger Noriega
- Succeeded by: Hector Morales

Personal details
- Born: August 28, 1938 (age 87) Braddock, Pennsylvania, U.S.
- Spouse: Maria Consuelo Gaston
- Profession: Foreign service officer

John Francis Maisto (born August 28, 1938, Braddock, Pennsylvania) is a retired U.S. career diplomat, who rose from Foreign Service Officer to eventually serve as a U.S. Ambassador in a number of postings.

== Early life and career progress ==
Maisto earned his BS from the Edmund A. Walsh School of Foreign Service at Georgetown University, then earned his MA at the University of San Carlos, Guatemala. After graduation, Maisto joined the United States Department of State as a Foreign Service Officer in 1968.

Early postings included working with the State Department's Information Agency in Argentina and Bolivia. He was later posted to positions at the US Embassies in the Philippines, Bolivia and Costa Rica. Maisto then served in postings as Director of the State Department's Office of Philippine Affairs (within the Bureau of East Asian and Pacific Affairs), and then the Deputy Chief of Mission in Panama.

In 1989, Maisto served as the Deputy U.S. Representative to the Organization of American States, then became the Deputy Assistant Secretary of State for Central American Affairs (reporting to the Assistant Secretary of State for Western Hemisphere Affairs) in 1992.

== United States Ambassador ==
In 1993, Maisto was nominated by President Bill Clinton to be the United States Ambassador to Nicaragua, serving in that position until November 1996. In March 1997, Maisto became the Ambassador to Venezuela, serving in that position until August 2000.

Maisto returned to the United States, and served as a Foreign Policy Advisor for the United States Southern Command for the next few months. In January 2001, with the inauguration of President George W. Bush, Maisto was brought in as a Special Assistant to the President and Senior Director for Western Hemisphere Affairs to National Secretary Advisor Condoleezza Rice.

In 2003, President Bush nominated Maisto to be the Ambassador to the Organization of American States, serving until March 2007.

== Sources ==
- United States Department of State: Biography of John F. Maisto
- United States Department of State: Ambassadors to the Organization of American States
- Appearances on C-SPAN

Diplomatic posts
Preceded by Harry W. Shlaudeman	United States Ambassador to Nicaragua; September 8, 1993–November 15, 1996	Succeeded by Lino Gutierrez
Preceded by Jeffrey Davidow	United States Ambassador to Venezuela; 21 March 1997–7 August 2000	Succeeded by Donna Hrinak
Preceded by Roger Noriega	United States Ambassador to the Organization of American States; 31 July 2003–15 March 2007	Succeeded by Hector Morales
