= Hector Morales (diplomat) =

American diplomat

18th United States Ambassador to the Organization of American States
- In office March 27, 2008 – July 8, 2009
- President: George W. Bush
- Preceded by: John Maisto
- Succeeded by: Carmen Lomellin

Personal details
- Born: Hector Elias Morales; 1963 (age 62–63)
- Education: Columbia College (BA); University of Texas (JD)

Hector Elias Morales (born 1963) is an American diplomat who served as the 18th United States Ambassador to the Organization of American States.

Morales was appointed on March 10, 2008 to the role of ambassador. He served in this position until September 2009. He was also confirmed as a member of the board of directors of the Inter-American Foundation.

Previously, Morales served as US Executive Director to the Inter-American Development Bank (IDB). He has nearly 20 years of experience of commerce in the Americas, both as a businessman and as a lawyer. He was formerly SVP of Viamericas Corporation, a company that offered the first pre-paid money transfer card in the US to the Latin American remittance market.

Between 1997 and 2000, Morales served as head of Reliant Energy Argentina. He carried out international practice at the firm's legal department from 1993 to 1997. Before joining Reliant, Morales was a lawyer in private practice in Austin and Houston. He obtained his J.D. from the University of Texas School of Law in 1989 and his B.A. in history from Columbia College of Columbia University in 1985.

After he stepped down from his role as ambassador, Morales has been a managing director of the Macquarie Group and is chairman of the Macquarie Development Corporation. He currently serves on the board of the National Audubon Society and is a member of the Council of American Ambassadors.
