= Luigi R. Einaudi =

American diplomat

Luigi Einaudi
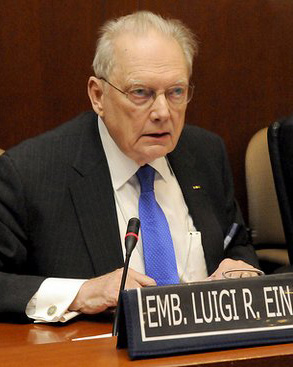

Secretary General of the Organization of American States
- Acting
- In office October 15, 2004 – May 26, 2005
- Preceded by: Miguel Ángel Rodríguez
- Succeeded by: José Miguel Insulza

12th United States Ambassador to the Organization of American States
- In office November 6, 1989 – April 14, 1993
- President: George H. W. Bush; Bill Clinton
- Preceded by: Richard T. McCormack
- Succeeded by: Harriet C. Babbitt

Personal details
- Born: Luigi Roberto Einaudi; March 1, 1936 (age 90) Cambridge, Massachusetts, U.S.
- Party: Democratic
- Spouse: Carol Peacock
- Children: 4
- Relatives: Mario Einaudi (father)
- Education: Harvard University (BA, MA, PhD)

Luigi Roberto Einaudi (born March 1, 1936) is an American career diplomat. He assumed the post of Acting Secretary General of the Organization of American States (OAS) in October 2004 upon the resignation of Secretary General Miguel Ángel Rodríguez.

== Early life and education ==
An Italian American, Einaudi was born to Mario and Manon Einaudi on 1 March 1936 in Cambridge, Massachusetts. Educated at Harvard University, he attained a Bachelor of Arts in 1957 and completed his PhD from Harvard in 1967.

== Career ==
He served in the US Army between 1957 and 1959. Following his military service, Einaudi was at the Woodrow Wilson International Center for Scholars. Between 1962 and 1974, he was a researcher at the RAND Corporation in Santa Monica, California, attaining his PhD from Harvard in 1966. From the 1970s onward, Einaudi served as the United States Department of State' policy-planning chief for Latin America. While at the US State Department, Einaudi met with Vladimiro Montesinos – then a captain in the Peruvian Army – during a Central Intelligence Agency (CIA) operation that brought Montesinos to Washington, D.C., which later resulted with the army captain's temporary imprisonment.

Einaudi has taught at Harvard University, Wesleyan University, University of California, Los Angeles and Georgetown University, and lectured at other universities and other societies in the United States, Latin America and Europe. A published author, Einaudi has written articles and monographs. He was the principal author of the book Beyond Cuba, Latin America Takes Charge of Its Future (1974).

From 1989 to 1993, Einaudi was the US Ambassador to the Organization of American States. He was elected as Assistant Secretary General in June 2000 by a 27–7 vote of the member states at the 30th regular session of the OAS General Assembly, held in Windsor, Ontario, Canada. He assumed the post of Acting Secretary General of the Organization of American States (OAS) in October 2004 upon the resignation of Secretary General Miguel Ángel Rodríguez.

Today, Einaudi is a member of the Council on Foreign Relations and is on the board of educational and non-profit institutions in the United States and Italy, particularly the Fondazione Luigi Einaudi (Turin), named for his grandfather, the second postwar President of Italy.

== Personal life ==
Einaudi is married to Carol Ann Peacock, a lawyer specialising in intellectual property. They have four children and ten grandchildren.

Diplomatic posts
Preceded by Richard T. McCormack	United States Ambassador to the Organization of American States; 1989–1993	Succeeded by Harriet C. Babbitt
Preceded by Miguel Ángel Rodríguez	Secretary General of the Organization of American States; Acting; 2004–2005	Succeeded by José Miguel Insulza
