= Frank Carollo =

Cuban-American politician

- Official portrait, circa 2009

Member of the Miami City Commission from the 3rd district
- In office 2009–2017
- Preceded by: Joe Sanchez
- Succeeded by: Joe Carollo

Personal details
- Party: Republican
- Relatives: Joe Carollo (brother)
- Profession: public accountant, fraud investigator, police officer, SWAT officer

Frank Carollo is an American politician who served as a member of the Miami City Commission. He has worked as a public accountant, fraud investigator, and a police officer.

== Early life, education, career ==
Carollo was born in Miami (circa 1970) and grew up in Miami. He attended local universities for his post-secondary education. He is the younger brother of Joe Carollo (a Miami politician who served as mayor of Miami among other offices).

Carollo is a certified public accountant. He also worked as a fraud investigator, Miami-Dade police officer, and a SWAT team member. He modeled for a poster featured in the 1995 Miami-Dade Police Department's calendar.

Carollo was the Republican Party nominee in the 1998 race for the 116th district seat in the Florida House of Representatives. Running against Democratic incumbent Annie Betancourt, Carollo lost the election; receiving 34.8% to Bettancourt's 65.2%.

== Miami City Commission (2009–2017) ==
In 2009, Carollo won election to the district 3 seat on the Miami City Commission. He was re-elected to a second term in 2013.

Some Miami politicians, including former city mayors Tomás Regalado and Xavier Suarez, have described Carollo as easier to work with than his older brother. Suarez wrote in his memoir of Carollo, "he acts professionally enough; his mumbled tirades are not nearly as vitriolic as his older brother's used to be."

With Carollo term limited from seeking an additional consecutive term in 2017, his brother Joe Carollo successfully ran for the seat instead. He initially held off on making a public endorsement in the race to succeed him, with his brother's opponent (Zoraida Barreiro) having been a candidate who Carollo had previously praised before his brother entered the race.

== 2025 Miami City Commission campaign ==
With his brother being term-limited in the district 3 seat, Carollo ran in 2025 to again hold the district 3 seat on the Miami City Commission. If his campaign had been successful, it would have marked the fifth consecutive term for which either he or his older brother had won election to the seat. Carollo's brother ran, ultimately unsuccessfully, in the coinciding mayoral election.

Carollo advanced to a runoff election with Rolando Escalona had been regarded as being aligned with the commission's existing political establishment, while Escalonda was fresh to electoral politics. Due to voters approving a referendum imposing a lifetime cap of two full terms on the Miami City Commission in a vote coinciding with the first round of the election, a legal challenge questioned whether Carollo as eligible to remain on the ballot for the runoff. However, the judge hearing the matter declined to have Carollo removed from the ballot. Nevertheless, he lost the runoff; receiving 46.9% to Escalona's 53.1%.
