= Earl Anthony Wayne =

American diplomat (born 1950)

Earl Wayne
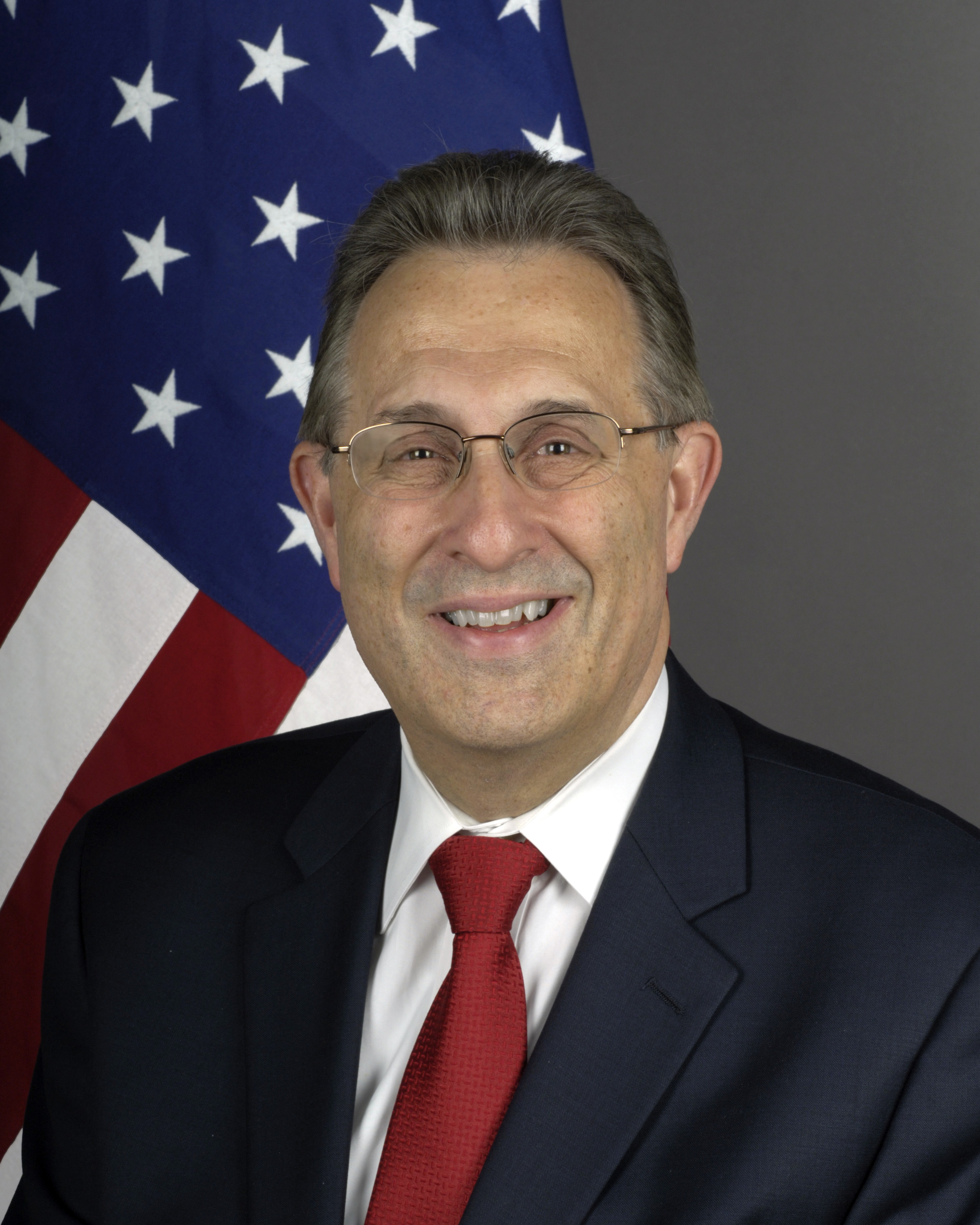
- Official portrait, 2011

United States Ambassador to Mexico
- In office September 6, 2011 – July 31, 2015
- President: Barack Obama
- Preceded by: Carlos Pascual
- Succeeded by: Roberta S. Jacobson

48th United States Ambassador to Argentina
- In office January 19, 2007 – April 6, 2009
- President: George W. Bush; Barack Obama
- Preceded by: Lino Gutierrez
- Succeeded by: Vilma Martínez

21st Assistant Secretary of State for Economic and Business Affairs
- In office June 1, 2000 – June 3, 2006
- President: Bill Clinton; George W. Bush
- Preceded by: Alan Larson
- Succeeded by: Dan Sullivan

Personal details
- Born: 1950 (age 75–76) Sacramento, California, U.S.
- Education: University of California, Berkeley; Stanford University; Princeton University; Harvard University

Earl Anthony Wayne (born 1950) is a former American diplomat. Formerly Assistant Secretary of State for Economic and Business Affairs, Ambassador to Argentina and Deputy Ambassador to Afghanistan, Wayne served nearly four years as Ambassador to Mexico. He was nominated by President Obama and confirmed by the Senate in August, 2011.

He departed Mexico City for Washington July 31, 2015 and retired from the State Department on September 30, 2015. Wayne attained the highest rank in the U.S. diplomatic service: Career Ambassador. He is currently a Professorial Lecturer and Distinguished Diplomat in Residence at American University's School of International Service where he teaches courses related to diplomacy and US foreign policy. Wayne was co-chair of the Board for the Mexico Institute at the Woodrow Wilson International Center for Scholars until it closed in May 2025. He now serves in a similar Board role for the Mexico program at the Inter-American Dialogue. He is a non-resident advisor at the Atlantic Council, and the Center for Strategic and International Studies. He is on the board of the Public Diplomacy Council of America, and is a member of the American Academy of Diplomacy. Wayne is an independent consultant, speaker and writer and helps with several not-for-profit professional associations. He was an adviser for HSBC Latin America on improving management of financial crime risk from 2015 until 2019 and served on the board of the American Foreign Service Association from 2017 to 2019.

== Life and education ==
Earl Anthony Wayne was born in Sacramento, California, and grew up in nearby Concord, where he graduated from Mt. Diablo High School. He earned a bachelor's degree in political science from the University of California, Berkeley (1972) where he was a member of Tau Kappa Epsilon fraternity, as well as being selected to be a member of Phi Beta Kappa. He continued his studies to earn master's degrees in political science from Stanford University (1973) and Princeton University (1975), and a master's degree in public administration from the John F. Kennedy School at Harvard University (1984). He is known as "Tony" to close acquaintances and is married with two adult children.

== Diplomatic career ==
A career diplomat starting in 1975, Wayne first served as a China analyst in the Department of State and was then posted overseas as a political officer in Rabat, Morocco. He was assigned to serve in the Executive Secretariat at the State Department under Secretaries of State Cyrus Vance and Edmund Muskie, in 1980. He worked as Special Assistant to Secretaries of State Alexander Haig and George Shultz, from 1981 to 1983. He was named First Secretary at the U.S. Embassy in Paris heading a section following French politics and working to promote US-French anti-terrorism cooperation (1984–87) following a mid-career Masters of Public Administration at Harvard University's John F. Kennedy School of Government (1983–84).

After Paris, Wayne took a leave of absence to work as the national security correspondent for The Christian Science Monitor for two years. He returned to Foreign Service as the Director for Regional Affairs for the U.S. Ambassador-at-Large for Counter-Terrorism, from 1989 to 1991. He served as Director for Western European Affairs at the National Security Council from June 1991 until mid-1993. Wayne took up the post of Deputy Chief of Mission at the U.S. Mission to the European Union working for Ambassador Stuart Eizenstat until 1996, when he returned to Washington as Deputy Assistant Secretary for Europe and Canada (1996–97).

His appointment as Principal Deputy Assistant Secretary in the Bureau of European Affairs in 1997 gave Wayne broader responsibilities including in the management of U.S. relations with the European Union, the OECD, the G-8, regional economic and global topics, and Nazi restitution issues, as well as oversight of bureau management and public diplomacy programs, including the overseeing integration of the first office of the US Information Agency (USIA) into the State Department. He played an important role in organizing the Stability Pact Summit for South West Europe in 1999, for which he subsequently received a Presidential Distinguished Service Award.

=== Assistant Secretary of State for Economic and Business Affairs ===
Wayne was nominated and confirmed as Assistant Secretary of State for Economic and Business Affairs (EB) in 2000. He served in that position under three Secretaries of State. In EB, he oversaw work on post-conflict economic assistance, economic sanctions, international debt, development and economic reform policies, combating the financing of terrorism, international energy policy, trade, intellectual property and investment policies, international telecommunications policy, international transportation policies, support for U.S. businesses overseas, and efforts to end trade in "conflict diamonds". He played a leading role in building international cooperation against the financing of terrorism following the attacks of September 11, 2001 and in coordinating a number of reconstruction and assistance donor conferences during this time including those for Afghanistan, Iraq, the countries affected by the 2004 Indian Ocean Tsunami, and the 2005 Pakistan earthquake.

Wayne served as Interim Under Secretary for Economic, Business and Agricultural Affairs in 2005, during which he also served as U.S. Foreign Affairs "Sous-Sherpa", helping prepare the Gleneagles G8 Summit. At his departure from EB in June, 2006, Wayne had become the longest serving Assistant Secretary of State for Economic and Business Affairs. He received a State Department Distinguished Honor Award and a Presidential Meritorious Service Award during his tenure as Assistant Secretary.

=== Ambassador to Argentina ===
In 2006, Wayne was nominated and confirmed as U.S. Ambassador to Argentina, and he presented his credentials in November 6 of that year. In 2008, he received the Paul Wellstone Anti-Slavery Ambassador of the Year Award for his work against trafficking in persons in Argentina. He also worked successfully to improve the image of the United States in Argentina, as well as to increase bilateral trade and investment and to improve cooperation on fighting illegal drugs, among other areas.

=== Afghanistan ===
In June 2009, Ambassador Wayne was asked to serve in a newly created position as Coordinating Director for Development and Economic Affairs in Kabul, Afghanistan, as part of the US civilian surge into that country. He worked to improve coordination of U.S. government non-military assistance to Afghanistan and to enhance cooperation between international donors and the Afghan government.

In late May, 2010, Wayne took over the position of Deputy Ambassador at the U.S. Embassy in Kabul. In that role, under Ambassador Karl Eikenberry, he oversaw Embassy programs and staff, worked closely with the Afghan government, coordinated with the International Security Assistance Force in Afghanistan and with other elements of the international community and Afghan society. Wayne received a Presidential Meritorious Service Award and a Secretary of Defense Medal for Meritorious Civilian Service (on the nomination of General David Petraeus) for his work in Afghanistan, as well as the Cordell Hull Award for Economic Achievement from the Department of State.

=== Ambassador to Mexico ===
In May 2011, President Obama submitted Wayne's nomination to be the US Ambassador to Mexico. Wayne was confirmed by the United States Senate on August 2, and presented his credentials to President Felipe Calderón on September 13, 2011. During Wayne's tenure, the United States and Mexico expanded cooperation on economic, educational, public security and other issues. The two governments established a High Level Economic Dialogue, the Mexico-U.S. Entrepreneurship and Innovation Council, the U.S.-Mexico Bilateral Forum on Higher Education, Innovation and Research, and a Bilateral Security Forum, while expanding cooperation under the $2.3 billion Mérida Initiative and on a range of border and travel issues. Trade, investment and tourism grew each year during Wayne's tenure. In 2014, the number of Mexicans studying in the U.S. doubled to over 30,000 and some 50 new university level partnerships were established, thanks to cooperation under the Bilateral Forum on Higher Education. Mission Mexico was chosen in 2014 by the State Department as the "Embassy to Watch" for its wide-ranging public-private partnerships, and in 2015, the Embassy was selected as one of three "Gender Champions" among U.S. Embassies world-wide for its efforts to support gender programs and good practices. Mission Mexico's outreach also grew massively during Wayne's tenure, for example, reaching 1 million Facebook likes for the Embassy alone by September, 2015. Wayne's work in Mexico was recognized by the U.S. and Mexican governments (see Recognition).

=== Recognition ===
Confirmed by the Senate as a "Career Ambassador" (2010) (the most senior rank of the U.S. Foreign Service); Cordell Hull Award for Economic Achievement by Senior Officers (2010); Paul Wellstone Anti-Slavery Ambassador of the Year Award (2008); Department of State's Distinguished Honor Award (2005); Presidential Distinguished Service Award (2001); two Presidential Meritorious Service Awards (2012, 2005); Secretary of Defense Medal for Meritorious Civilian Service (2011); Global Ambassador of Peace and Public Service, International House, University of California, Berkeley (2015); Order of the Aztec Eagle granted by Mexico's President Enrique Peña Nieto and Foreign Minister Jose Antonio Meade (2015). In October 2015, Wayne was chosen to receive the State Department's Charles E. Cobb Jr. Award for Initiative and Success in Trade Development. In June 2017, the Director General of the Foreign Service awarded Wayne the Director General's Cup for the Foreign Service.

Political offices
Preceded by Alan Larson	Assistant Secretary of State for Economic, Energy, and Business Affairs; 2000-2006	Succeeded by Dan Sullivan
Diplomatic posts
Preceded by Lino Gutierrez	United States Ambassador to Argentina; 2006–2009	Succeeded by Vilma Martínez
Preceded by Carlos Pascual	United States Ambassador to Mexico; 2011–2015	Succeeded by Roberta Jacobson
