= Angela Ducey =

American businesswoman and philanthropist

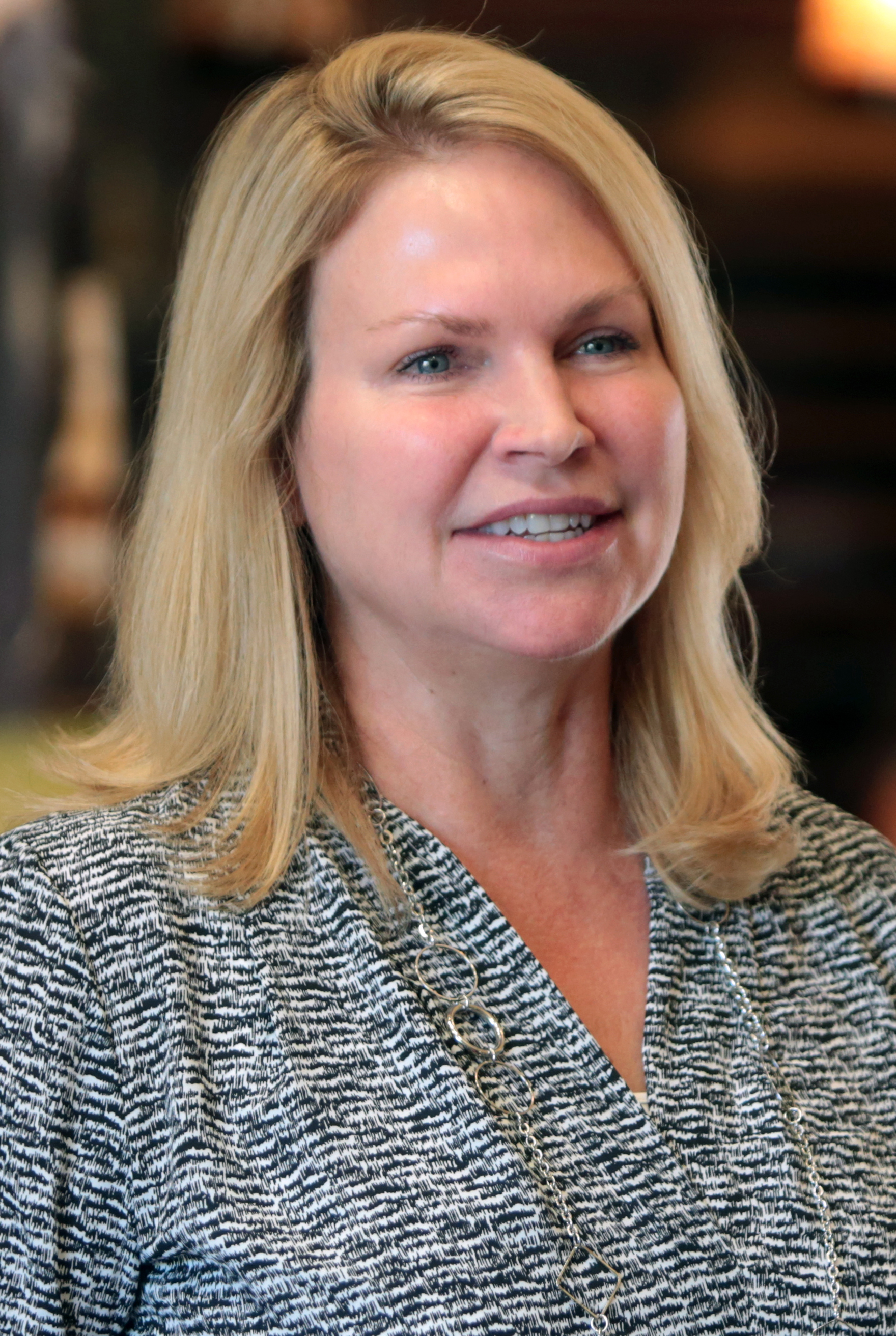
- Ducey in 2016

First Lady of Arizona
- In role January 5, 2015 – January 2, 2023
- Governor: Doug Ducey
- Preceded by: John Brewer (as first gentleman)
- Succeeded by: Patrick Goodman (as first gentleman)

Personal details
- Born: Angela Herbert; December 5, 1965 (age 60) Arizona, U.S.
- Party: Republican
- Spouse: Doug Ducey (m. 1992)
- Children: 3
- Education: Arizona State University
- Profession: Sales, management

Angela Ducey (/ˈduːsi/ DOO-see; née Herbert; born December 5, 1965) is an American businesswoman and philanthropist who served as the first lady of Arizona from 2015 to 2023 as the wife of Governor Doug Ducey.

Angela met her husband at Arizona State University, and is a native Arizonan. She previously worked in sales and management for Gallo Wines, and continued her career in the food service industry working for several large companies, before leaving the workforce to raise her three children. She is the co-owner of a small retail design store in Scottsdale.

Since becoming first lady, Ducey had made the welfare of children and the assistance of charitable organizations a top priority among her duties.

== First Lady of Arizona (2015–2023) ==
Angela Ducey succeeded John Brewer, husband of Governor Jan Brewer, in the position of First Spouse on January 5, 2015, following the inauguration of her husband, Doug Ducey. Prior to being elected Governor, Doug Ducey had served four years as the State Treasurer of Arizona, and was also a businessman involved with management of the ice cream chain Cold Stone Creamery.

Ducey is involved with several charitable organizations and has served as a board member of Childhelp Arizona, Catholic Charities Community Services, notMYkid and Mother's Grace Foundation, and has also been involved with several other charities, such as CarePortal. She is training to become a Court Appointed Special Advocate for Arizona's foster children.

== Personal life ==
Angela met her husband at Arizona State University in Tempe, and have been married since 1992. They have three sons, Jack, Joe and Sam, and currently reside in Paradise Valley. They are Roman Catholic.
