= Juan-Carlos Planas =

American politician

Juan Carlos Planas
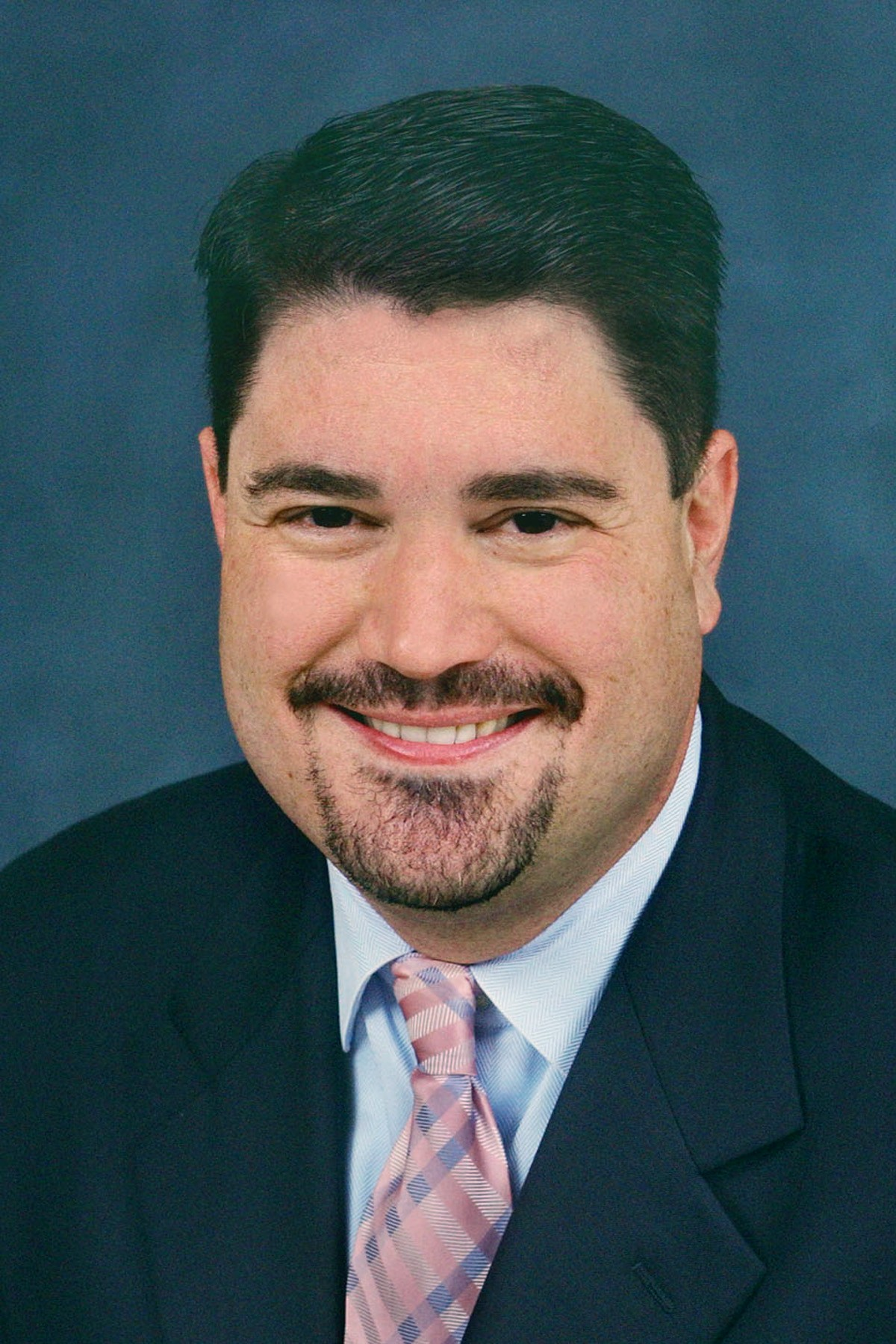

Member of the Florida House of Representatives from the 114 district
- In office 2002–2010
- Succeeded by: Jose Felix Diaz

Personal details
- Born: July 17, 1970 (age 56) Miami, Florida
- Party: Democratic (2020–present); Independent (2019–2020); Republican (until 2019)
- Spouse: Viviana Martinez
- Education: Florida State University (BS); St. Thomas University School of Law (JD)
- Profession: Attorney

Juan-Carlos "J.C." Planas (born July 17, 1970 in Miami, Florida) is an American politician.

He received his bachelor's degree from the Florida State University in 1993. A former prosecutor, he received his Juris Doctor from St. Thomas University School of Law in 1998. He lives in the community of Westchester in Miami-Dade County, Florida. He is married to Viviana.

Originally a Republican and former member of Florida House of Representatives, Juan-Carlos switched his party registration to unaffiliated in 2019, and subsequently to Democratic in 2020. This was in part due to Planas' opposition to Donald Trump, the Republican president at the time.

In July 2023, Planas returned to politics and announced his candidacy for the Miami-Dade County Supervisor of Elections in 2024. His opponent was Republican State Representative Alina Garcia., who ultimately defeated him. Planas won 44.16% of the vote, amounting to 458,770 votes.
