= Lino Gutierrez =

American diplomat (1951–2025)

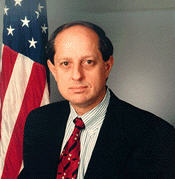

47th United States Ambassador to Argentina
- In office April 16, 2003 – April 8, 2006
- President: George W. Bush
- Preceded by: James Donald Walsh
- Succeeded by: Earl Anthony Wayne

United States Ambassador to Nicaragua
- In office December 5, 1996 – July 21, 1999
- President: Bill Clinton
- Preceded by: John Francis Maisto
- Succeeded by: Oliver P. Garza

Personal details
- Born: March 26, 1951 Havana, Cuba
- Died: May 3, 2025 (aged 74) Alexandria, Virginia, U.S.
- Spouse: Miriam Messina
- Children: 3
- Education: University of Miami; The University of Alabama
- Profession: Diplomat
- Awards: Distinguished Honor Award

Lino Gutiérrez (March 26, 1951 – May 3, 2025) was an American diplomat.

Gutiérrez served as Ambassador to Argentina from September 2003 through July 2006. He was succeeded by Earl Anthony Wayne. Gutiérrez served as the Executive Director of the Una Chapman Cox Foundation and as an adjunct professor at the Elliott School of International Affairs, George Washington University in Washington, D.C., and the School of Education at Johns Hopkins University.

== Early life and education ==
Gutiérrez was a native of Havana, Cuba, where he lived until his family fled the regime of Fidel Castro in 1961. They lived in Cali, Colombia for 14 months before moving permanently to the United States. Gutiérrez attended the University of Miami and The University of Alabama, where he received a B.A. in Political Science (1972) and an M.A. in Latin American Studies (1976). He was a social studies teacher for the Dade County School System and the Urban League in Miami, Florida before entering the diplomatic services.

== Foreign service career ==
Gutiérrez entered the United States Foreign Service in 1977 and served in Latin America, Europe and the Department of State. He has served as International Affairs Advisor at the National War College (2002), Principal Deputy Assistant Secretary for Western Hemisphere Affairs at the State Department (1999–2001), Acting Assistant Secretary for Western Hemisphere Affairs (2001–2002), United States Ambassador to Nicaragua (1996–1999).

During his tenure as U.S. Ambassador to Argentina, the United States and Argentina signed agreements on counter-terrorism and counter-narcotics cooperation, and container security. In 2005, Gutiérrez welcomed President Bush to Argentina as he attended the Summit of the Americas. As Acting Assistant Secretary for Western Hemisphere affairs, Gutiérrez led the Bureau of Western Hemisphere Affairs on September 11, 2001 and beyond. He accompanied Secretary of State Colin Powell to Lima, Peru for the signing of the Inter-American Democratic Charter, and returned with the Secretary's party to the United States on September 11, 2001. During his tenure in Nicaragua, Gutiérrez coordinated the U.S. relief effort following the devastation of Hurricane Mitch in October 1998.

Gutierrez also served in Santo Domingo, Lisbon, Port-au-Prince, Grenada, Paris and Nassau. In Washington DC, Gutiérrez has served as Officer-in-Charge of Nicaraguan Affairs, Officer-in-Charge of Portuguese Affairs, and Director of the Office of Policy Planning, Coordination and Press in the Bureau of Inter-American Affairs.

Gutiérrez was a recipient of the Department of State's Distinguished Honor Award, Superior Honor Award (twice) and Meritorious Honor Award (three times).

== Other activities ==
In 2007, Gutiérrez became CEO of Gutierrez Global LLC, a consulting firm specializing on strategic advice for corporations interested in investing in Latin America and Europe. From 2007 to 2009, Gutiérrez served as Senior Advisor to Secretary of Commerce Carlos Gutiérrez on Cuba transition and Latin America.

In December 2010, Gutiérrez was named Executive Director of the Una Chapman Cox Foundation, which is dedicated to a strong and professional Foreign Service.

Gutiérrez also served as an adjunct professor at Johns Hopkins University and George Washington University, and served on the board of Georgetown University's Institute for the Study of Diplomacy. Secretary of State John Kerry appointed Gutiérrez to the Foreign Service Grievance Board in 2016.

== Death ==
Gutiérrez died in Alexandria, Virginia on May 3, 2025, at the age of 74. He was survived by his wife, Miriam Messina of Santo Domingo, his three daughters, and six grandchildren.

Diplomatic posts
Preceded by Chic Hecht	United States Chargé d'Affairs ad interim, the Bahamas; March 1993 – July 1993	Succeeded by John S. Ford as Chargé d'Affairs ad interim
Preceded by John Francis Maisto	United States Ambassador to Nicaragua; December 5, 1996 – July 21, 1999	Succeeded by Oliver P. Garza
Preceded by James Donald Walsh	United States Ambassador to Argentina; October 15, 2003 – July 19, 2006	Succeeded by Earl Anthony Wayne
