= Luis J. Lauredo =

American diplomat

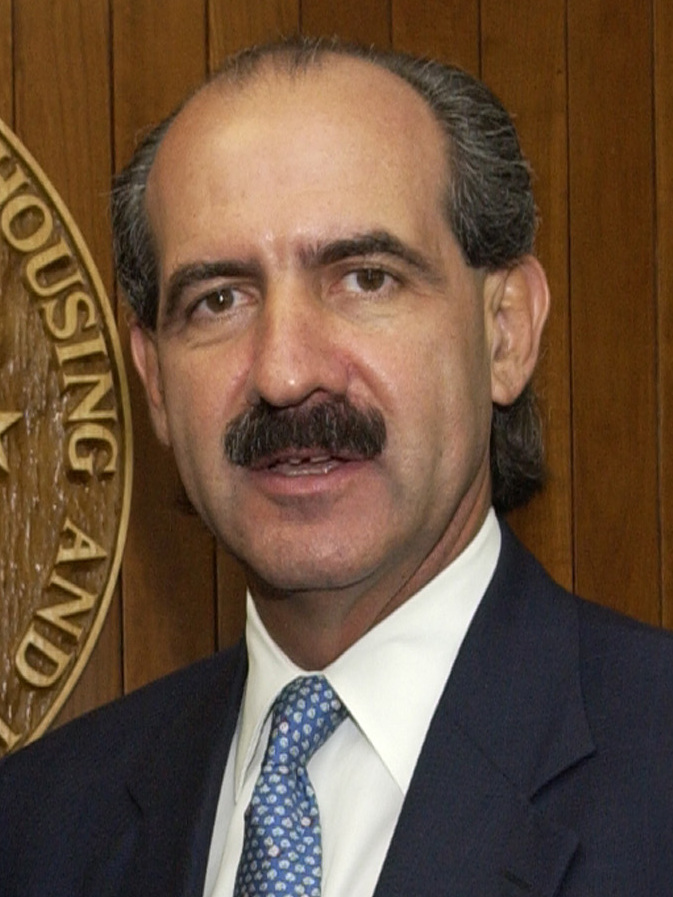

15th United States Ambassador to the Organization of American States
- In office January 7, 2000 – June 28, 2001
- President: Bill Clinton
- Preceded by: Victor Marrero
- Succeeded by: Roger Noriega

Personal details
- Born: 1949 (age 76–77)
- Education: Columbia College; Complutense University of Madrid; Georgetown University Law Center
- Website: http://luislauredo.com/

Luis J. Lauredo (born 1949) is an American diplomat who served as the 15th United States Ambassador to the Organization of American States from 2000 to 2001 and National Coordinator for the 3rd Summit of the Americas held in Quebec City, Canada.

== Biography ==
Lauredo (furthest right) with other officials at the 1999 Summit of the Americas in Miami; L–R: Frank Brogan (FL. lt. gov.), Buddy MacKay (U.S. SE for the Americas), Katherine Harris (FL. SOS), Alex Penelas (Miami-Dade mayor), Joe Carollo (Miami mayor)

Lauredo received his Bachelor of Arts degree from Columbia College, graduating in 1972. He attended the University of Madrid, Spain for graduate studies and Georgetown University Law Center.

Lauredo had an extensive career in public service. He was Senior Vice President of the Export-Import Bank of the United States, Commissioner of the Florida Public Service Commission, City Councilman for the Village of Key Biscayne, Florida, and as the President's Representative to the Southern States Energy Board. He served as the executive director of the 1994 Summit of the Americas in Miami.

Lauredo was appointed on December 22, 1999, for the post of ambassador. At the time of his appointment, he was the President of Greenberg Traurig Consulting Inc., an affiliate of the international law firm Greenberg Traurig, where he specialized in international relations, energy, telecommunications, aviation, and banking issues.

He is a member of the Council of American Ambassadors.
