= Richard McCormack =

Richard McCormack may refer to:

- Richard T. McCormack, U.S. government official and diplomat
- Richard McCormack (politician) (born 1947), political figure in the state of Vermont

== See also ==
- Dick McCormick (born 1968), American soccer player
