= Ashley Perez-Biliskov =

American politician

Member of the Florida House of Representatives from the 116th district
- Incumbent
- Assumed office November 3, 2026
- Preceded by: Daniel Perez

Personal details
- Party: Republican
- Relations: Daniel Perez (brother)
- Website: Campaign website

Ashley Perez-Biliskov is an American politician. A member of the Republican Party, she has served in the Florida House of Representatives since 2026, representing the 116th district. She succeeded her brother Daniel Perez at the 2026 election. She is Cuban-American.
