= Una Chapman Cox Foundation =

American non-profit organization

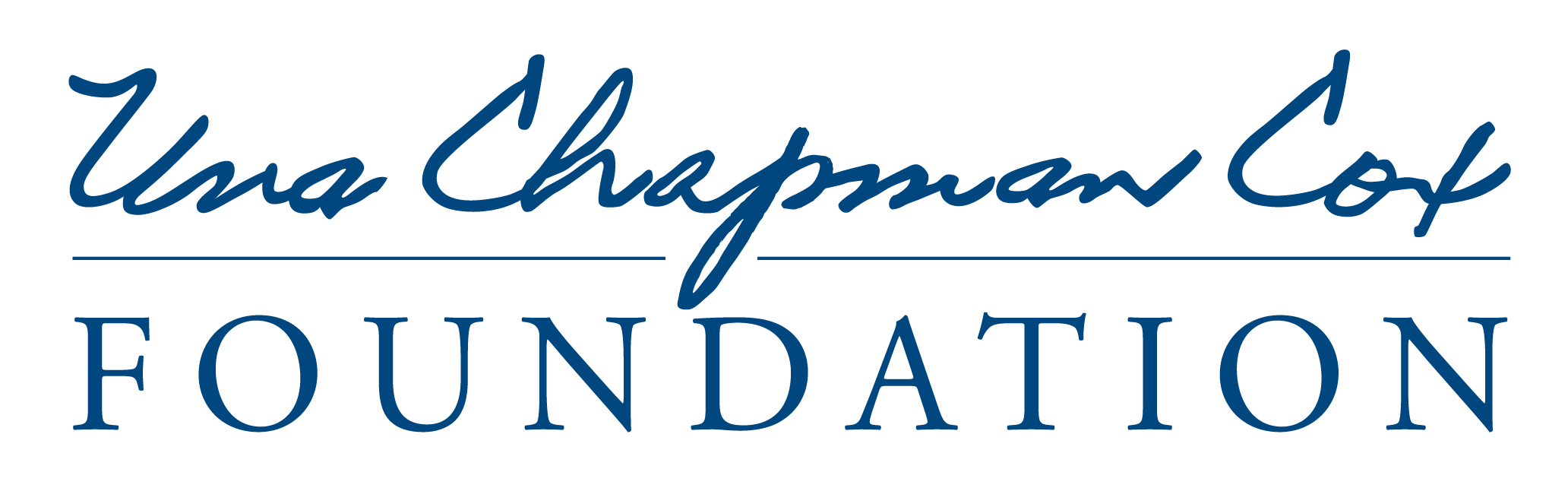
- Formation: 1980; 46 years ago
- Founder: Una Chapman Cox
- Type: 501(c)(3) non-profit organization
- Headquarters: Washington, D.C., United States
- Fields: U.S. foreign policy
- Key people: [Jo Ellen Powell] (Executive Director)
- Revenue: $2,055,308 (2016)
- Expenses: $1,209,534 (2016)
- Website: uccoxfoundation.org

The Una Chapman Cox Foundation is a non-profit organization that works to support the effectiveness and professionalism of the United States Foreign Service through various projects and initiatives.

Amb. (ret.) Lino Gutierrez serves as the current Executive Director.

== History ==
In 1948 in Bombay, India, Una Chapman Cox, a Texas rancher, was arrested by authorities for traveling without her passport. A Foreign Service Officer named Royal Bisbee worked to arrange her release and return to the United States. Cox founded the organization 32 years later, in 1980, out of gratitude for the work of Foreign Service Officers. Cox left $16 million from her estate for the organization.

Cox served as the sole trustee of the organization until her death in 1982.

== Activities ==
The Una Chapman Cox Foundation is notable for its projects and initiatives that support excellence in recruitment, professional development, and public awareness and its collaboration with the U.S. Department of State and other program partners. The foundation also offers sabbatical leave fellowships to distinguished mid-level Foreign Service Officers, selected by the Director General of the Foreign Service to pursue special projects.

The Una Chapman Cox Foundation has developed programs and worked alongside partners such as the American Academy of Diplomacy (AAD), the American Foreign Service Association (AFSA), the Association for Diplomatic Studies and Training (ADST), and the United States Diplomacy Center.

Recent projects include American Diplomat and The General and the Ambassador, two podcasts created for the foundation by AAD as part of a Cox Foundation program to educate the public about the Foreign Service; studies and events on the importance of commercial and economic diplomacy; and development of a career exploration program on diplomatic careers for students from Historically Black Colleges and Universities and Hispanic Serving Institutions.
