= Daniel Perez (politician) =

American politician (born 1987)

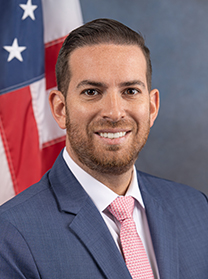
- Official portrait, 2024

United States Ambassador-designate to Brazil
- Assuming office TBD
- President: Donald Trump
- Succeeding: Elizabeth Bagley

104th Speaker of the Florida House of Representatives
- In office November 19, 2024 – August 21, 2026
- Preceded by: Paul Renner
- Succeeded by: Wyman Duggan (acting)

Member of the Florida House of Representatives from the 116th district
- In office November 6, 2018 – August 21, 2026
- Preceded by: Jose Felix Diaz
- Succeeded by: Ashley Perez-Biliskov

Personal details
- Born: Daniel Anthony Perez; June 22, 1987 (age 39) New York City, New York, U.S.
- Party: Republican
- Spouse: Stephanie Perez
- Relations: Ashley Perez-Biliskov (sister)
- Children: 3
- Education: Florida State University (BA); Loyola University New Orleans (JD)

Daniel Anthony Perez (born June 22, 1987) is an American politician who served as a Republican member of the Florida House of Representatives representing the state's 116th House district, which includes part of Miami-Dade County.

== Florida House of Representatives ==
Perez defeated Jose Mallea in a special Republican primary held on July 25, 2017, winning 54.8% of the vote. In the September 26, 2017 special general election, Perez won 65.8% of the vote, defeating Democrat Gabriela Mayaudon.

Seeking election to his first full term in 2018, Perez defeated Frank Polo in the August 28, 2018 Republican primary, winning 80.5% of the vote. In the November 6, 2018 general election, Perez won 57.32% of the vote, defeating Democrat and NBA player James Harden.

In 2022, Perez defended Republican efforts to add elaborate requirements for voters to vote by mail. These included forcing voters to put their double-enveloped ballots inside a third envelope and to mark the last four letters of their identity numbers. Election officials characterized the requirements as a "recipe for disaster" while voting rights advocates characterized the efforts as voter suppression. Perez defended the measures, saying "the process is actually going to be simpler... and at the same time it would be safer."

In September 2023, Perez was nominated Speaker-designate of the Florida House of Representatives by his caucus. After the 2024 elections, he succeeded Paul Renner as Speaker of the Florida House of Representatives.

Perez's term as House speaker was marked by a political feud with Florida Governor Ron DeSantis. DeSantis wielded extraordinary power as governor;Perez stated that his goal was for the Legislature to be "a coequal branch of government." DeSantis accused Perez of following a personal agenda,while Perez accused DeSantis of cronyism. The House under Perez leadership overrode Desantis's veto on funding for legislative operations, reporting that "this veto was at best a misunderstanding of the importance of the appropriation, or, at worst, an attempt to threaten the independence of our separate branch of government."

In January 2025, Perez, alongside other Floridian Republicans including Florida Senate President Ben Albritton, helped to bring down an attempt by DeSantis to call a special session on the topic of illegal immigration. Perez claimed that the call for a special session should "... be used sparingly and not be stunts used to generate headlines.", as well as calling the governor's proposals "bureaucratic". As a replacement, Perez and other Republican state legislators have pushed through and passed the "Tackling and Reforming Unlawful Migration Policy Act" (TRUMP Act) which DeSantis has criticized for being "substantially weaker" than what he had pushed for and threatened to veto the bill.

Perez has also effectively blocked DeSantis's policy proposals for property-tax cuts, state regulation of artificial intelligence, and conscience-based exemptions for childhood vaccine mandates in schools. Additionally, in early 2025, Perez briefly launched an investigation into Florida First Lady Casey DeSantis's Hope Florida for money laundering and wire fraud. However, in April 2026, Perez helped DeSantis in redistricting Florida's congressional map for the 2026 U.S. House midterm elections, approving a new map which gave Republicans 4 more seats.

Partly due to the political feud between a Perez-allied House and a DeSantis-allied Senate, the Legislature was unable to pass a state budget two years in a row, in 2025 and 2026, during regular session, forcing the Senate to reject some of DeSantis's initiatives to reach a compromise and avoid a government shutdown.

In September 2025, it was reported that President Donald Trump's political team supported the idea for Perez to run for the office of the Attorney General of Florida in 2026 against incumbent Attorney General James Uthmeier, an ally of Governor DeSantis. Perez would go on to not run for Attorney General, continuing to serve as speaker until he resigned on August 21, 2026.

In 2026, Perez made farewell speeches for his time as House Speaker, praising the chamber's ability to remain independent and stand their ground against the executive. Perez thanked his political mentors in the House and President Trump, and notably left out DeSantis allies and the governor. Perez stated:

Despite what some have suggested, I never intended for conflict to define my tenure as Speaker. But I have always believed that peace without purpose is laziness. Our goal has been to leave this House of Representatives better than we found it. And we can end this term content that we have achieved at least that much.

Perez resigned from the House on August 21, 2026, following his confirmation as United States Ambassador to Brazil. He was succeeded in his house district at the 2026 election by his sister Ashley Perez-Biliskov.

== United States Ambassador to Brazil ==
On June 1, 2026, President Donald Trump nominated Perez to serve as the United States ambassador to Brazil. On July 16, 2026, Perez underwent his confirmation hearing in front of the U.S. Senate Foreign Relations Committee, speaking about amending the Trump administration's tumultuous relationship with the presidency of Luiz Inácio Lula da Silva, a day after U.S. Trade Representative Jamieson Greer announced a 25% tariff on certain Brazilian imports. Before the Senate met to vote on Perez's appointment, on July 25, 2025, the Lula administration denied visas to two U.S. Department of State officials, accusing them of attempting to cast doubt on Brazilian election integrity, religious freedom, and freedom of expression.

On August 7, 2026, Perez was confirmed by the U.S. Senate, along party lines, as U.S. Ambassador to Brazil. However, Perez is unable to take office until the Brazilian government grants diplomatic approval. The Lula administration accused the Trump administration of not consulting the Brazilian government regarding Perez's appointment, which is required by the Vienna Convention on Diplomatic Relations. In response, the U.S. Department of State revoked the visa of Maria Luiza Ribeiro Viotti, Brazil's ambassador to the United States.

== Personal life ==
Perez is a Catholic. He is also a first generation son of Cuban immigrants.

Political offices
Preceded by Paul Renner	Speaker of the Florida House of Representatives; 2024–2026	Succeeded by Wyman Duggan; Acting
Diplomatic posts
Preceded by Kimberly Kelly; Acting	United States Ambassador to Brazil; Taking office 2026	Designate
