= José Félix Díaz =

American politician (born 1980)

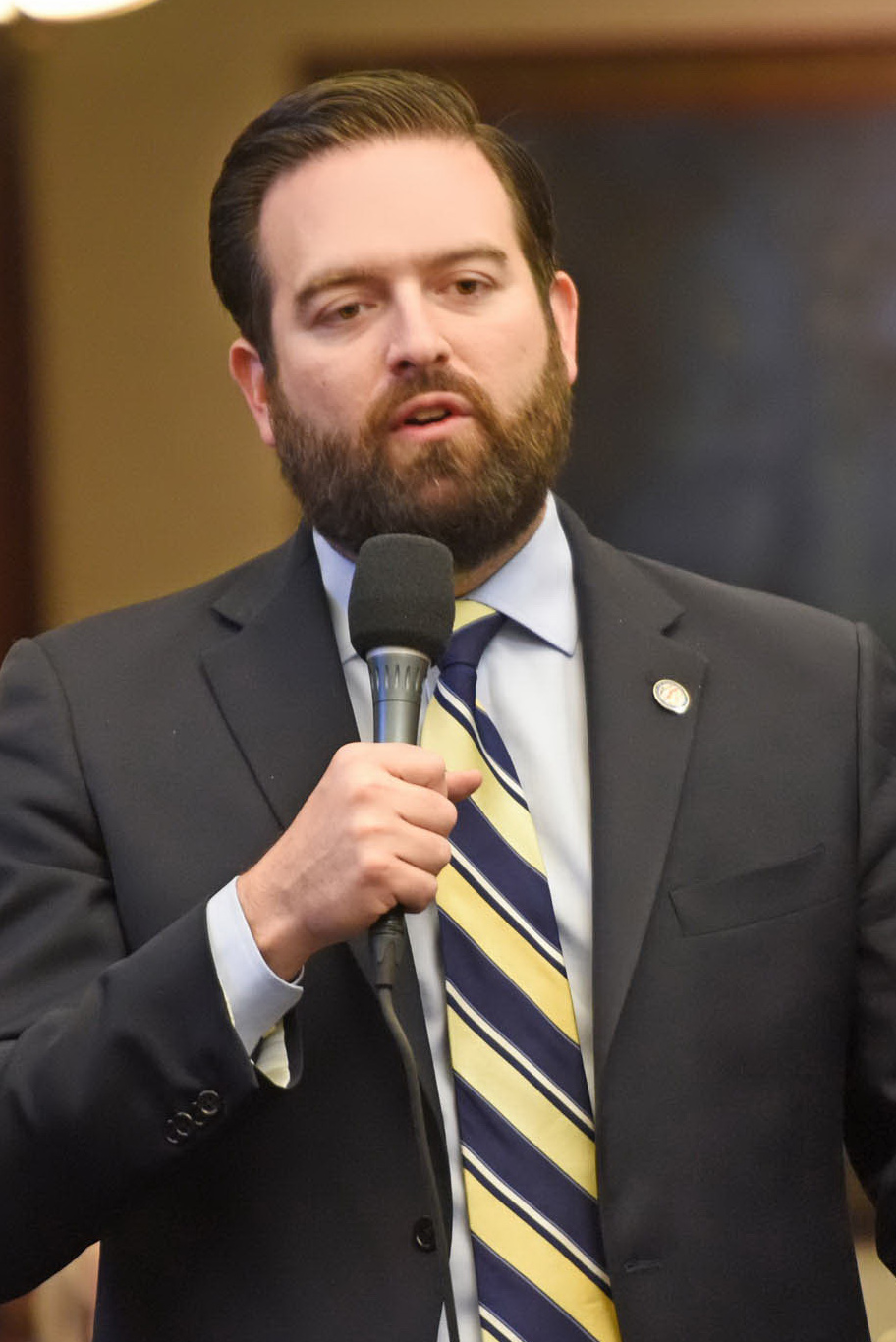

Member of the Florida House of Representatives
- In office November 2, 2010 – September 26, 2017
- Preceded by: Juan-Carlos Planas
- Succeeded by: Daniel Perez
- Constituency: 115th district (2010–2012); 116th district (2012–2017)

Personal details
- Born: January 16, 1980 (age 46) Miami, Florida
- Party: Republican
- Spouse: Therese Marie Diaz
- Children: Dominick J. Diaz, Christian M. Diaz, Elyse Diaz
- Education: University of Miami (B.A.); Columbia Law School (J.D.)
- Profession: Attorney

José Félix Díaz (born January 16, 1980) is a Republican politician from Florida. He served in the Florida House of Representatives from 2010 to 2017, representing parts of Miami-Dade County. He resigned from the House in 2017 to run for a special election to the Florida Senate, but was not elected.

== History ==
Díaz was born in Miami and attended St. Brendan High School, after which he attended the University of Miami, where he received a degree in political science and English in 2002. He then received his Juris Doctor from Columbia Law School in 2005, and moved back to Florida, where he was a losing contest on Season 5 of The Apprentice. After leaving the show, Díaz began working for Akerman LLP as an attorney specializing in commercial litigation and zoning and land use. From 2006 to 2010, he served as a member of the American Bar Association House of Delegates.

== Florida House of Representatives ==
=== 2010–2012 ===
In 2010, when incumbent State Representative Juan-Carlos Planas was unable to seek re-election, Díaz ran to succeed him in the 115th district, which narrowly stretched from Doral to Cutler Ridge in Miami-Dade County. He faced Kendall Community Councilwoman Carla Ascencio-Savola in the Republican primary, and he campaigned on improving the quality of living in the district, noting, "It's an important time to make this area, this district, better. People have lost confidence in where they live," and on his lack of experience in politics, declaring, "People have rallied around the fact that I'm not the same-old, same-old in the district." Ultimately, Díaz defeated Ascencio-Savola by a comfortable margin, winning 60% of the vote to her 40%. He advanced to the general election, where he was opposed by Jeffrey Solomon, the Democratic nominee and Christopher Blau, the Tea Party nominee. Neither of his opponents proved to be a significant obstacle, however, and Díaz easily defeated both of them in a landslide, winning 64% of the vote to Solomon's 33% and Blau's 3%.

=== 2012–2017 ===
When the state's legislative districts were redrawn in 2012, Díaz was drawn into the 116th district, which contained most of the territory that he had previously represented in the 115th district. He faced fellow State Representative Ana Rivas Logan in the Republican primary, and an extremely contentious election ensued. Díaz accused Logan of having her campaign workers tell voters that he was gay, was "pro-abortion" and "voted for a 15-percent increase" in university tuition, while Logan alleged that Díaz's campaign made calls to voters in the district, telling them, "Don't vote for her. She's a Nicaraguan. Your commitment is with the Cuban vote." Despite the rancor of the race, however, it was not close, with Díaz winning the nomination with 66% of the vote to Logan's 34%. Advancing to the general election, he only faced write-in opposition and won re-election with nearly 100% of the vote.

In 2013 Díaz was mentioned as a potential candidate to run against Democratic United States Congressman Joe García in the 26th Congressional District, he ultimately declined to run, instead opting to run for re-election.

Díaz served as the chair on the Florida House Regulatory Affairs Committee. He was also a member of the Florida House Appropriations Committee, K-12 Subcommittee, and the Local Government Affairs Subcommittee. In January 2016, the Florida House Health Innovation Subcommittee unanimously voted to approve the KidCare legislation sponsored by Díaz, which would allow thousands of children legally residing in Florida to receive health coverage through the KidCare subsidized insurance program.

In September 2017, Democrat Annette Tadeo won the District 40 election over Díaz.

Florida House of Representatives
| Preceded by Juan-Carlos Planas | Member of the Florida House of Representatives from the 115th district 2010–2012 | Succeeded by Michael Bileca |
| Preceded by Carlos Trujillo | Member of the Florida House of Representatives from the 116th district 2012–2017 | Succeeded by Daniel Perez |
