= Jeffrey Davidow =

American diplomat

United States Ambassador to Mexico
- In office August 5, 1998 – September 14, 2002
- President: Bill Clinton; George W. Bush
- Preceded by: James R. Jones
- Succeeded by: Tony Garza

United States Ambassador to Zambia
- In office July 11, 1988 – March 31, 1990
- President: Ronald Reagan; George H. W. Bush
- Preceded by: Paul Julian Hare
- Succeeded by: Gordon L. Streeb

United States Ambassador to Venezuela
- In office October 1, 1993 – May 16, 1996
- President: Bill Clinton
- Preceded by: Michael Martin Skol
- Succeeded by: John F. Keane

26th Assistant Secretary of State for Inter-American Affairs
- In office August 7, 1996 – July 6, 1998
- Preceded by: Alexander Watson
- Succeeded by: Peter F. Romero

Personal details
- Born: January 26, 1944 (age 82) Boston, Massachusetts, U.S.
- Party: Democratic

Jeffrey S. Davidow (born January 26, 1944) is a career foreign service officer from the U.S. state of Virginia. Davidow has served as a member of the Senior Foreign Service, as well as having been the U.S. Ambassador to Zambia, Venezuela, and Mexico.

Upon completion of 34 years of service, he retired as the highest ranking U.S. diplomat. Davidow was one of the few people to hold the rank of Career Ambassador.

== Early life ==
Davidow was born in Boston, Massachusetts. He received a B.A. from the University of Massachusetts in 1965 and an MA from the University of Minnesota in 1967. He also did postgraduate work in India 1968 on a Fulbright travel grant.

== Career ==
Davidow joined the U.S. Foreign Service in 1969 and began his career as a junior officer at the American Embassy in Guatemala City, Guatemala, from 1970 to 1972. From 1972 to 1974, he was a U.S. political observer in Santiago, Chile (involved in the case of Charles Horman), and held the same position in Cape Town, South Africa, from 1974 to 1976. He returned to Washington, D.C. in 1976 to take a position as a desk officer in the Office of Southern African Affairs, and he went on to be a Congressional fellow from 1978 to 1979.

He later became the head of the liaison office at the U.S. Embassy in Harare, Zimbabwe, from 1979 to 1982. He returned shortly thereafter to pursue a fellowship at Harvard University, as well as to take-over as Director of the Office of Southern African Affairs in 1985.

On May 5, 1988, President Ronald Reagan nominated Davidow to be U.S. Ambassador to Zambia, a position he held until 1990.

After his ambassadorship to Zambia, he served as deputy assistant secretary of state.

In 1993, President Bill Clinton nominated Davidow to be U.S. Ambassador to Venezuela. Davidow remained ambassador until 1996.

From 1996 to 1998, he was the State Department's chief policy maker for the Western Hemisphere, serving in the position of Assistant Secretary of State.

Clinton again nominated Davidow in 1998, this time as U.S. Ambassador to Mexico. Davidow held this post from August 5, 1998, until September 14, 2002.

After leaving Mexico in September 2002, he returned to Harvard to become a visiting fellow at the John F. Kennedy School of Government and the David Rockefeller Center for Latin American Studies. During the 2002–03 academic year, he worked extensively with undergraduate and graduate students and wrote a book on U.S.–Mexican relations. The US and Mexico: The Bear and the Porcupine was first published in Spanish in Mexico by Casa Editorial Grijalbo and in English by Markus Weiner Publishers in April 2004.

Davidow assumed the presidency of the Institute of the Americas on June 1, 2003. The Institute of the Americas, founded in 1983, is an independent, non-profit institution at the University of California, San Diego. Its mission is to be a catalyst for promoting development and integration as a means to improve the economic, political, and social well-being of the people of the Americas.

In 2004, Davidow was among 27 retired diplomats and military commanders called Diplomats and Military Commanders for Change who publicly said the administration of President George W. Bush did not understand the world and was unable to handle "in either style or substance" the responsibilities of global leadership. On June 16, 2004, the former senior diplomats and military commanders issued a statement against the Iraq War.

He has also served as adviser to President Barack Obama for the Summit of the Americas. He is also a member of the advisory board for the Mexico Institute.

== Personal life ==
Davidow and his wife, Joan, reside in La Jolla, California. The Archives and Special Collections at Amherst College holds some of his papers.

Diplomatic posts
Preceded by Paul Julian Hare	United States Ambassador to Zambia; 1988–1990	Succeeded by Gordon L. Streeb
Preceded by Michael Martin Skol	United States Ambassador to Venezuela; October 1, 1993 – May 16, 1996	Succeeded by John Francis Maisto
Preceded by James R. Jones	United States Ambassador to Mexico; 1998–2001	Succeeded by Tony Garza
Government offices
Preceded by Alexander Watson	Assistant Secretary of State for Inter-American Affairs; August 7, 1996 – 1998	Succeeded by Peter F. Romero
