= Victor Marrero =

Puerto Rico-born American judge (born 1941)

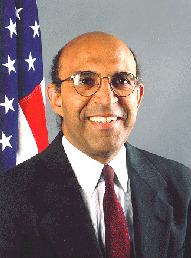

Senior Judge of the United States District Court for the Southern District of New York
- Incumbent
- Assumed office December 31, 2010

Judge of the United States District Court for the Southern District of New York
- In office October 5, 1999 – December 31, 2010
- Appointed by: Bill Clinton
- Preceded by: Sonia Sotomayor
- Succeeded by: Andrew L. Carter Jr.

14th United States Ambassador to the Organization of American States
- In office January 5, 1998 – November 15, 1999
- President: Bill Clinton
- Preceded by: Harriet C. Babbitt
- Succeeded by: Luis J. Lauredo

United States Ambassador to the Economic and Social Council of the United Nations
- In office 1993–1997
- President: Bill Clinton

United States Under Secretary of Housing and Urban Development
- In office 1979–1981
- President: Jimmy Carter
- Preceded by: Jay Janis
- Succeeded by: Donald I. Hovde

Commissioner of the New York State Housing Finance Agency
- In office 1978–1979
- Governor: Hugh Carey

Personal details
- Born: September 1, 1941 (age 84) Santurce, San Juan, Puerto Rico
- Education: New York University (BA); Yale University (LLB)

Victor Marrero (born September 1, 1941) is a senior United States district judge of the United States District Court for the Southern District of New York.

== Education and career ==
Marrero was born in Santurce, San Juan, Puerto Rico. He received a Bachelor of Arts degree from New York University in 1964 and a Bachelor of Laws from Yale Law School in 1968.

Marrero was an assistant to the mayor of New York City from 1968 to 1970. He next served as an assistant administrator/neighborhood director of the Model Cities Administration in New York City from 1970 to 1973, co-founding of the Puerto Rican Legal Defense and Education Fund in 1972. He continued working in the city government, serving as Executive Director of the Department of City Planning of New York City from 1973 to 1974 and as special counsel to the comptroller of New York City from 1974 to 1975. He then moved to the New York State government, serving as the Governor's first assistant counsel from 1975 to 1976, then returned to New York City and served as the Chairman of the City Planning Commission in 1976–77. He was a Commissioner and Vice Chairman of the New York State Housing Finance Agency from 1978 to 1979. He was the Undersecretary of the United States Department of Housing and Urban Development from 1979 to 1981. He was in private practice of law in New York City from 1981 to 1993. He served as United States Ambassador to the Economic and Social Council of the United Nations from 1993 to 1997. He was the United States Ambassador and Permanent Representative of the United States to the Organization of American States from 1998 to 1999.

=== Federal judicial service ===
Marrero was nominated by President Bill Clinton on May 27, 1999 to serve as a United States district judge of the United States District Court for the Southern District of New York. He was nominated to a seat vacated by Sonia Sotomayor, upon her elevation to the Court of Appeals. He was confirmed by the United States Senate on October 1, 1999, and received commission on October 5, 1999. He assumed senior status on December 31, 2010.

=== Notable cases ===
Marrero is well known for twice striking down elements of the USA PATRIOT Act, most recently in September 2007, stating that the provision in question "offends the fundamental constitutional principles of checks and balances and separation of powers."

On October 7, 2019, Marrero dismissed an attempt by President Donald Trump to prevent his accountants from complying with a New York prosecutor's subpoena for eight years of President Donald Trump's tax returns.

On February 11, 2020, Marrero allowed T-Mobile and Sprint to complete their merger after nine states and the District of Columbia sought to block it.

On August 20, 2020, Marrero dismissed another attempt by President Trump to allow his accountants to disregard the New York prosecutor's subpoena for eight years of the president's tax returns. In the ruling, he held that the prosecutor's grand jury subpoena was valid and the Presidents attempts to challenge it were dilatory and without merit.

He concluded: "Justice requires an end to this controversy

On September 21, 2020, Marrero ordered USPS to treat all election mail as "first-class mail" or "priority mail express", and also required them to "pre-approve" all overtime requests for the 2 weeks surrounding Election Day to ensure that absentee ballots are processed properly.

== See also ==
- List of Hispanic and Latino American jurists
- List of Puerto Ricans

Legal offices
Preceded by Sonia Sotomayor	Judge of the United States District Court for the Southern District of New York; 1999–2010	Succeeded by Andrew L. Carter Jr.
Diplomatic posts
Preceded by Harriet C. Babbitt	United States Ambassador to the Organization of American States; 1998-1999	Succeeded by Luis J. Lauredo
