= Francisco O. Mora =

American diplomat and academic

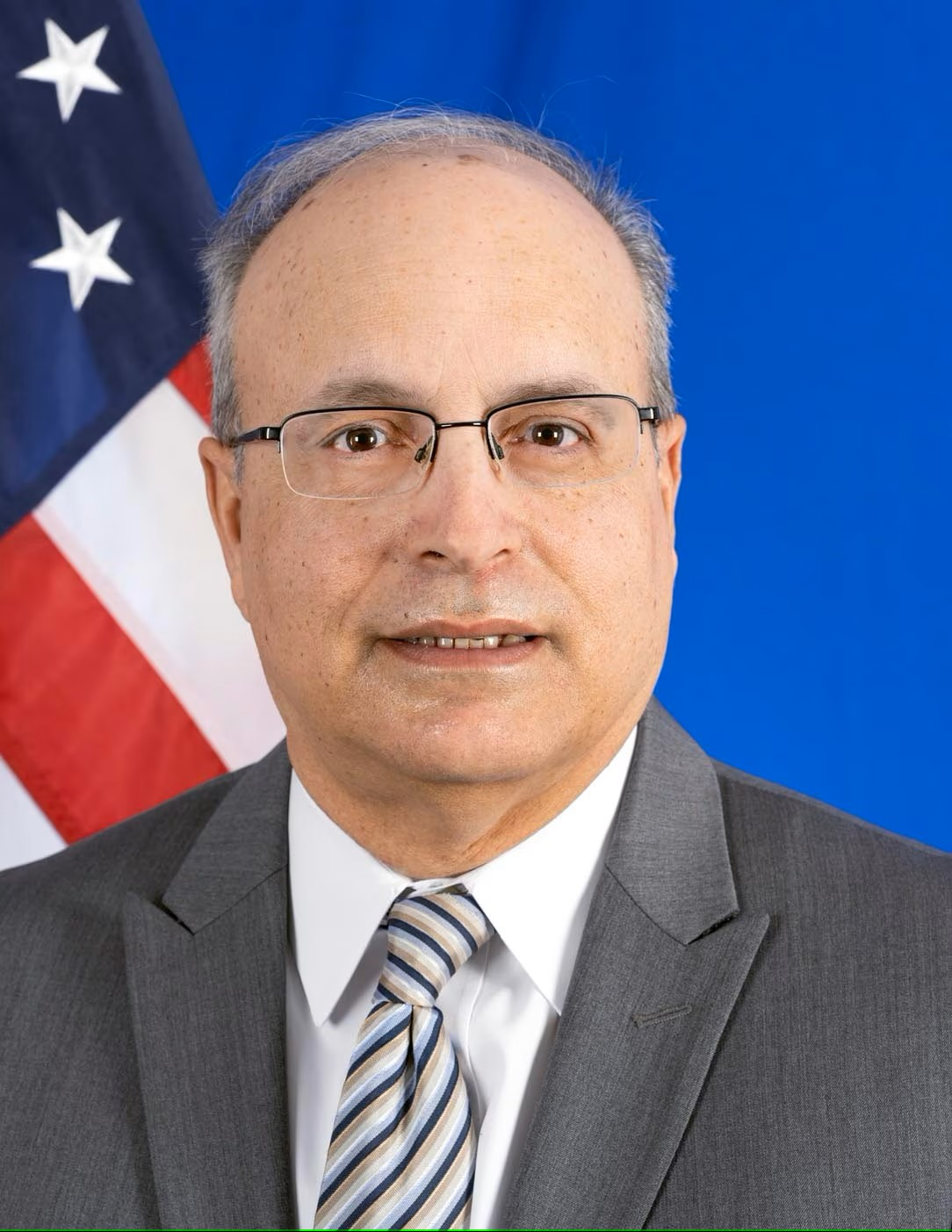

21st United States Ambassador to the Organization of American States
- In office January 18, 2023 – January 11, 2025
- President: Joe Biden
- Preceded by: Carlos Trujillo
- Succeeded by: Leandro Rizzuto Jr.

Deputy Assistant Secretary of Defense for the Western Hemisphere
- In office 2009–2013
- President: Barack Obama

Personal details
- Education: George Washington University (BA); University of Miami (MA, PhD)

Francisco O. "Frank" Mora is an American academic who had served as the United States ambassador to the Organization of American States.

== Education ==
Mora earned a Bachelor of Arts in international affairs at the George Washington University. He received his Master of Arts. in Inter-American Studies and a Doctor of Philosophy in International Affairs from the University of Miami. He also studied at the Pontifical Catholic University of Peru in 1984 and participated in a program on Central American studies in 1988 in Costa Rica.

== Career ==
Mora served as Deputy Assistant Secretary of Defense for the Western Hemisphere from 2009 to 2013. He held several teaching positions, including Professor of National Security Strategy and Latin American Studies at the National War College at the National Defense University from 2004 to 2009, and associate professor and chair in the department of international studies at Rhodes College from 2000 to 2004. He previously served as director of the Kimberly Green Latin American and Caribbean Center at FIU's Green School of International and Public Affairs. He is a professor of politics and international relations, and senior researcher, at the Jack D. Gordon Institute for Public Policy at Florida International University. He is the author of five books, including Neighborly Adversaries: U.S.-Latin American Relations (2015); Paraguay and the United States: Distant Allies (2008) and Latin American and Caribbean Foreign Policy (2003); and numerous articles and other publications.

=== Ambassadorship nomination ===
On July 29, 2021, President Joe Biden nominated Mora to be the next United States Ambassador to the Organization of American States. On August 2, 2021, his nomination was sent to the Senate. Hearings on his nomination were held before the Senate Foreign Relations Committee on May 18, 2022. The committee favorably reported his nomination to the Senate floor on June 23, 2022. The Senate confirmed him by a 51–45 vote on December 14, 2022. He was sworn in on December 30, 2022, and he presented his credentials to the Organization of American States on January 18, 2023.

== Awards and recognition ==
Mora is a recipient of the Office of the Secretary of Defense Medal for Exceptional Public Service, Department of Defense.

== Personal life ==
Mora speaks Spanish and Portuguese.

Diplomatic posts
Preceded by Carlos Trujillo	United States Ambassador to the Organization of American States; 2023–2025	Succeeded by Leandro Rizzuto Jr.
