= Florida's 116th House of Representatives district =

Florida district

Florida's 116th State House of Representatives district
Representative
| Ashley Perez-Biliskov; R |

Florida's 116th House of Representatives district elects one member of the Florida House of Representatives. It contains parts of Miami-Dade County.

== Members ==
- José Félix Díaz (2012–2017)
- Daniel Perez (2018-2026)
- Ashley Perez-Biliskov (2026-present)
