= Isaac Nevett Steele =

American diplomat and lawyer (1809–1891)

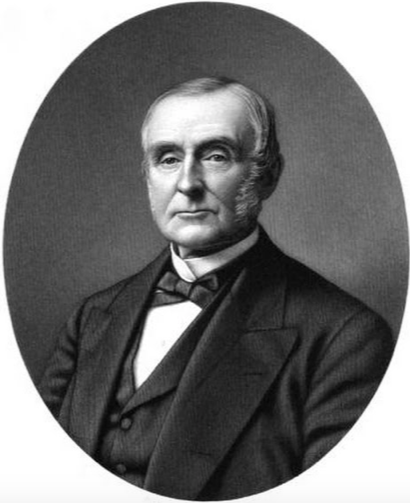

United States Chargé d'Affaires, Venezuela
- In office January 7, 1850 – October 18, 1853
- President: Zachary Taylor; Millard Fillmore; Franklin Pierce
- Preceded by: Benjamin Glover Shields
- Succeeded by: Charles Eames

Personal details
- Born: May 25, 1809 Cambridge, Maryland, U.S.
- Died: April 11, 1891 (aged 81) Baltimore, Maryland, U.S.
- Resting place: Green Mount Cemetery
- Party: Whig Party
- Spouse: Rosa Loundonia Nelson (m. 1849)
- Relations: John Nevett Steele (brother)
- Children: 8, including Charles
- Parent(s): James Steele; Mary Nevett Steele
- Education: Cambridge Public Academy; St. John's College
- Alma mater: Trinity College
- Occupation: Lawyer

Isaac Nevett Steele (April 25, 1809 – April 11, 1891) was an American diplomat and lawyer who was "universally recognized for years as the leader of the Maryland Bar."

== Early life ==
Steele was born on April 25, 1809, in Cambridge, Maryland. He was the ninth of ten children born to Mary (née Nevett) Steele (1769–1836) and James Steele (1760–1816). Among his many siblings was brother U.S. Representative John Nevett Steele; and sister Mary Nevett Steele, who married John Campbell Henry (the eldest son and heir of Gov. John Henry); Ann Billings (née Steele) Upshur; James Billings Steele; Henry Maynadier Steele; Catharine Sarah Maria (née Steele) Ray; Sarah Maynadier Steele.

His paternal grandparents were Anne (née Billings) Steele and Henry Steele, a native of England who emigrated from Whitehaven (on the west coast of Cumbria) to Oxford, Maryland, in 1730 and served as a representative of Dorchester County at the convention which met at Annapolis in June 1774.

Steele was educated at the Cambridge Public Academy under Rev. Nathaniel Sheldon Wheaton and prepared at St. John's College in Annapolis (formerly known as King William's School) until the age of sixteen when he entered Trinity College in Hartford, Connecticut (then known as Washington College).

== Career ==
Steele began studying the law at the age of eighteen in the offices of Alexander Contee Magruder and David Hoffman, a law professor at the University of Maryland. After he was admitted to the bar in 1830, he quickly became an undisputed leader of the Maryland bar and ranked as one of the foremost lawyers in America. In 1839, he was appointed Deputy Attorney-General for the Baltimore County Court under Josiah Bayley. He held the position under Bayley's successor, George R. Richardson, until 1849.

=== Chargé d'Affaires, Venezuela ===
In December 1849, Steele was appointed Chargé d'Affaires to Venezuela by U.S. President Zachary Taylor, a member of the Whig Party from Kentucky, during a recess of the U.S. Senate. He presented his credentials in Caracas on January 7, 1850, and was recommissioned on June 24, 1850, after confirmation. He remained in his post after Taylor's unexpected death seven months later in July 1850 when Millard Fillmore became president, and served until October 18, 1853, when he was succeeded by Charles Eames, several months after Democrat Franklin Pierce was sworn in as the 14th president after his defeat of Whig candidate Gen. Winfield Scott.

While in his post, he had to contend with Venezuela radical Narciso López, who led repeated filibustering expeditions in an attempt to conquer the island of Cuba, then a colony of Spain. The annexation of Cuba was the object of fascination among many in the South, who saw in Cuba a potential new slave state, and López had several prominent Southern supporters. López made several generous offers to American military leaders to support him, but Taylor and his Secretary of State, John M. Clayton, viewed the enterprise as illegal, issuing a blockade, and later, authorized the arrest of López and his associates for breach of the Neutrality Act, although they were eventually acquitted by friendly Southern juries. During Fillmore's presidency, López began another expedition which ended with his execution by the Spanish, along with several Americans, including the nephew of Attorney General John J. Crittenden, which led to riots against the Spanish in New Orleans. Fillmore and his Secretary of State, Daniel Webster, worked out a series of face-saving measures with the Spanish that settled the crisis without armed conflict. Many Southerners, including Whigs, supported the filibusters, and Fillmore's response helped divide the Whig party in the 1852 election.

Reportedly, Steele narrowly escaped death when a band of robbers broke into the United States legation at Caracas in an attempt to steal the money of diplomatic representatives held for safe-keeping by the chargé d'Affaires. While in Venezuela, he was able to secure settlement of several American's substantial claims which "had been so long postponed as to be regarded as hopeless."

=== Later career ===
Upon his return to the United States in 1853, he resumed his legal practice and was involved in nearly all of the most prominent cases before the Maryland courts with his name appearing "more frequently in the pages of Maryland reports than any other lawyer of his time." Steele was noted for "the clearness of his statements, the strength and force of his logic and his power as a cross-examiner" and appeared before the Supreme Court of the United States. From 1872 to 1874, he served as the attorney of Baltimore City.

Steele was one of the charter members of the Maryland Club (founded in 1857), and served as one of its first governors. He was also a member of the Maryland Historical Society.

== Personal life ==
On January 22, 1849, Steele was married to Rosa Londonia Nelson (1825–1894) in Washington, D.C. She was a daughter of the late Frances (née Burrows) Nelson and John Nelson, a former U.S. Representative who served as the Chargé d'Affaires to the Kingdom of the Two Sicilies under Andrew Jackson and U.S. Attorney General under John Tyler. Her paternal grandfather was Revolutionary War Brig. Gen. and U.S. Rep. Roger Nelson and her maternal grandfather was William Ward Burrows, the second Commandant of the Marine Corps. Together, Isaac and Rosa were the parents of five sons and three daughters, including:

- James Nevett Steele (1850–1916), a minister affiliated with Trinity Church in New York City. He married Helen Hudson Aldrich, a daughter of prominent New York businessman Herman D. Aldrich.
- Mary Steele (1852–1931).
- John Nelson Steele (1853–1933), a lawyer with the firm of Steele, Semmes & Carey who later became general counsel of the Guggenheim Bros.' American Smelting & Refining company. He married Mary Alricks in 1880.
- Charles Steele (1858–1939), a prominent attorney who was a J.P. Morgan & Co. partner for 39 years. He married Ann "Nannie" Gordon French (1866–1932), a descendant of Revolutionary War general Hugh Mercer, and the daughter of Seth Barton French, a former Confederate soldier who became a cotton broker and banker after the War.
- Rosa Nelson Steele (1861–1941).
- Kate Steele (1862–1944).
- Samuel Tagart Steele (1863–1942), also a lawyer with Steele, Semmes & Carey, who married Mary Thompson.
- Henry Maynadier Steele (1865–1909), a civil engineer who specialized in railroads. He married Margaret Hollins McKim (1869–1939) (Note: Margaret's brother, Dr. Smith Hollins McKim (1873–1932), was married to Margaret Mary Emerson (1886–1960), the daughter of Captain Isaac Edward Emerson and heiress to the Bromo-Seltzer fortune. They divorced in 1910, and she remarried to Alfred Gwynne Vanderbilt in 1911.) in 1894.

Steele died at his home, 14 West Madison Street in Mount Vernon, Baltimore, on April 11, 1891, just shy of his 82nd birthday. After a funeral at Emmanuel Episcopal Church, he was buried at Green Mount Cemetery.

=== Descendants ===
Through his son Charles, he was the grandfather of three granddaughters: Eleanor Herndon Steele (1893–1977), who married four times, and with her fourth husband established the charitable Steele-Reese Foundation; Nancy Gordon Steele (1894–1955), who married renowned polo-player Devereux Milburn; and Kathryn Nevitt Steele (1896–1981), who married Francis Skiddy von Stade Sr., also a star polo player. His great-great-granddaughter is Frederica Von Stade, the opera singer. His great-great-grandson is John Steele Gordon, the historian.

=== Honors and legacy ===
In 1872, he was awarded an honorary LL.D. from his alma mater, St. John's College. In 1895, Steele was posthumously described thusly:

Steele was "one of the brightest, keenest, analytical legal minds that ever graced and adorned the bar of Maryland or any State, or shed lustre upon any court anywhere. As a counsellor, adviser, or practitioner of the law, he stood without a superior, and when he died he left behind a reputation for eloquence, soundness in the law, fidelity to every interest intrusted to him, that has never been surpassed. His countenance, his manner, his walk and conversation bespoke not only the student learned in all the principles and abstruse points of his profession, but also showed the man who loved it, and believing in it honored it at all times and under all circumstances."

Diplomatic posts
Preceded by Benjamin G. Shields	U.S. Chargé d'Affaires, Venezuela; January 7, 1850 – October 18, 1853	Succeeded by Charles Eames
