= Charles Steele (lawyer) =

American lawyer (1857–1939)

- Born: May 5, 1857; Baltimore, Maryland, U.S.
- Died: August 5, 1939 (aged 82); Old Westbury, New York, U.S.
- Resting place: Locust Valley Cemetery, Locust Valley, New York, U.S.
- Education: University of Virginia; Columbia Law School
- Occupation: Lawyer
- Employer: J.P. Morgan & Co.
- Spouse: Nannie Gordon French (m. 1885; died 1932)
- Children: 3
- Parent(s): Isaac Nevett Steele; Rosa Nelson Steele
- Relatives: John Nevett Steele (uncle)

Charles Steele (May 5, 1857 – August 5, 1939) was an American lawyer and philanthropist who was a member of J.P. Morgan & Co. for 39 years.

== Early life ==
He was a son of Isaac Nevett Steele (1809–1891) and Rosa Londonia (née Nelson) Steele (1825–1894). Among his siblings was the Rev. James Nevett Steele of Trinity Church (his wife as a daughter of Herman D. Aldrich), Mary Steele, John Nelson Steele, Rosa Nelson Steele, Kate Steele, Henry Maynadier Steele. His father was a "distinguished lawyer" who was "universally recognized for years as the leader of the Maryland Bar" and served as the Chargé d'Affaires, Venezuela under three U.S. Presidents, serving from 1850 to 1853.

He was the nephew of Rep. John Nevett Steele, and Mary Nevett Steele, who married John Campbell Henry (the eldest son and heir of Gov. John Henry). His maternal grandfather was U.S. Representative, U.S. Ambassador to Italy and U.S. Attorney General John Nelson and his great-grandfather was Revolutionary War Brig. Gen. and U.S. Rep. Roger Nelson.

Steele attended the University of Virginia, receiving a Master of Arts degree in 1878. He later graduated from Columbia Law School in 1880.

== Career ==
After his graduation from Columbia, he was admitted to the bar in New York on motion of Theodore William Dwight. He first practiced alone, then in 1880, joined with Field, Dorsheimer, Bacon & Deyo, later renamed Dorsheimer, Bacon & Steele. He later became a partner of James A. Buchanan, the former head of the law department of the New York, Lake Erie and Western Railroad, in the firm of Buchanan & Steele, with Steele becoming general counsel of the Erie. Seward, Guthrie & Steele on February 1, 1892. In the 1890s, Morgan partner Charles H. Coster retained Steele to assist with reorganizing certain railroad interest, including the reorganization of the Erie Railroad.

In 1900, Coster died and J. Pierpont Morgan invited Steele, during Coster's funeral, to become a partner in J.P. Morgan & Co. Steele then "played an important but unpublicized part in the affairs of the firm until 1934, when, because of his age, he gave up active participation. He remained a partner, however, until his death, although he gave up his many corporate directorships at his retirement." At the time of his admission, a single partnership agreement governed both the American and French houses of Morgan, therefore, Steele was admitted as a partner in the New York firm, the Philadelphia firm (Drexel, Morgan & Co.) and the Paris firm (Morgan, Harjes & Co.). Steele, who became a close friend of Morgan, served on the corporate boards of the International Mercantile Marine Co., the U.S. Steel Corporation, the Southern Railroad Company, the International Harvester Company, Cerro de Pasco, and the Atchison, Topeka & Santa Fe Railroad.

== Personal life ==
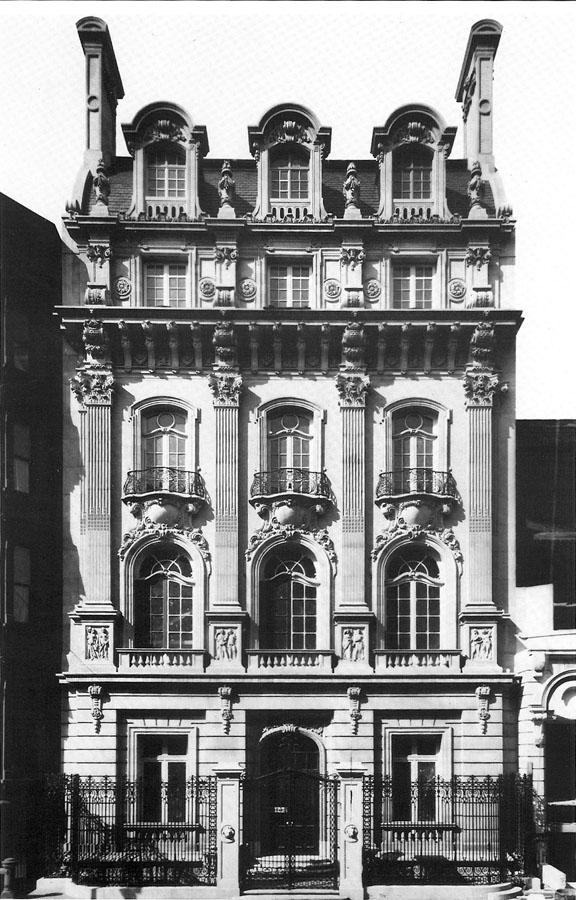
The Steele Mansion in New York, designed by the firm of Haydel & Shepard, 1900

In 1885, Steele was married to Richmond-born Ann "Nannie" Gordon French (1866–1932). She was the daughter of Ellen Mercer (née Herndon) French, a descendant of Revolutionary War general Hugh Mercer, and Seth Barton French, a former Confederate soldier who became a cotton broker after the War and later an associate at J.P. Morgan. She was an older half-sister of Dr. John Herndon French, who also lived in New York, from her father's second marriage to Mary Walker Fearn (a daughter of U.S. Minister to Greece Walker Fearn (Note: After Nannie's father's death in Palm Beach, Florida in 1910, his widow, the former Mary Walker Fearn (1866–1964), remarried to Russian émigré Prince Serge Wolkonsky.)). The Steele's maintained residences in New York City (a Beaux-Arts mansion at 11 East 62nd Street (Note: Steele bought the New York City mansion in 1912 from Edith and Ernesto Fabbri, a daughter of Margaret Louisa Vanderbilt Shepard and Elliott Fitch Shepard. The 1900 Beaux-Arts mansion was designed by Augustus Haydel (a nephew of Stanford White) and August D. Shepard Jr. (a nephew of Elliott Shepard and William Rutherford Mead).)), in Old Westbury, (Note: Their Old Westbury mansion was built for James F. D. Lanier and designed by James Brown Lord, c. 1891. After Steele acquired the mansion, he extensively renovated it.) and a large cottage in Southampton, New York. (Note: The Steele's bought their Southampton property from the estate of William Yates Mortimer (father of Richard Mortimer) in October 1898 for $9,000 (equivalent to $348,300 today) and commissioned a "two-and-a-half story English Tudor-style building". The home was razed in 1984) Together, Charles and Nannie were the parents of three daughters:

- Eleanor Herndon Steele (1893–1977), who married Count Jean de la Greze of Paris in 1910. They divorced in 1920, and she married Dr. Louis Debonnesset in 1920. They also divorced and she married H. Hall Clovis in 1930. They too divorced and she remarried for the fourth and final time to Emmet P. Reese (d. 1982) in 1941.
- Nancy Gordon Steele (1894–1955), who married Devereux Milburn (1881–1942) in 1913.
- Kathryne Nevitt Steele (1896–1981), who married Francis Skiddy von Stade Sr. (1884–1967) in 1915. Kathryne Steele was a grandmother of the opera singer Frederica von Stade.

A devoted director of the Metropolitan Opera Association for the Metropolitan Opera House, he was also a member of the Racquet and Tennis Club, the Metropolitan Club, the Piping Rock Club, the Meadow Brook Club, the National Golf Links of America and the Shinnecock Hills Golf Club.

Steele died at his home in Westbury on August 5, 1939. After a funeral at St. Thomas' Church at Fifth Avenue and 53rd Street, where 100 seats were reserved for employees of J.P. Morgan (including Junius S. Morgan and Thomas W. Lamont), he was buried at the Locust Valley Cemetery on Long Island. After his death, his estate was valued at $29,498,373 (equivalent to $682,767,365 today), including a $23,122,904 interest in J.P. Morgan. Each of his daughters received $1,500,000 (equivalent to $34,718,900 today) and an interest in the remainder of the estate.

=== Philanthropy ===
Steele was noted for his generous philanthropy both during his lifetime, and after his death which totaled $5,000,000 (equivalent to $115,729,665 today). A lover of music and former pupil of Dr. T. Tertius Noble, he gave $100,000 (equivalent to $1,923,459 today) in 1922 to St. Thomas' Church for the purchase of buildings for a permanent choir school, today known as the Saint Thomas Choir School, which was founded in 1919. He gave an additional $300,000 (equivalent to $5,507,590 today) to endow the school in 1925, and another $100,000 to the Church upon his death.
