= Von Stade =

von Stade is a surname. Notable people with the surname include:

- Francis Skiddy von Stade Sr. (1884–1967), American polo player, father of Charles von Stade
- Charles von Stade (1919–1945), American polo champion, father of opera singer Frederica von Stade
- Frederica von Stade (born 1945), American classical singer
