= Emily Nelson Ritchie McLean =

President General of the Daughters of the American Revolution (1859 – 1916)

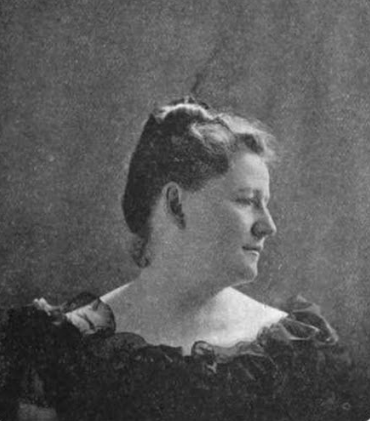
- McLean in 1895

7th President General of the National Society Daughters of the American Revolution
- In office 1905–1909
- Preceded by: Cornelia Cole Fairbanks
- Succeeded by: Julia Green Scott

Personal details
- Born: Emily Nelson Ritchie; January 28, 1859 Prospect Hall; Frederick, Maryland, U.S.
- Died: May 20, 1916 (aged 57) Baltimore, Maryland, U.S.
- Resting place: Mount Olivet Cemetery
- Spouse: Donald McLean (m. 1883)
- Children: 3, including Becky McLean Gardiner
- Parent: John Ritchie (father)
- Relatives: William P. Maulsby (grandfather); John Nelson (granduncle); Roger Nelson (great-grandfather); Israel D. Maulsby (great-grandfather)
- Education: Frederick Female Seminary

Emily Nelson Ritchie McLean (January 28, 1859 – May 20, 1916) was an American civic leader who served as the 7th president general of the National Society Daughters of the American Revolution.

== Early life and family ==
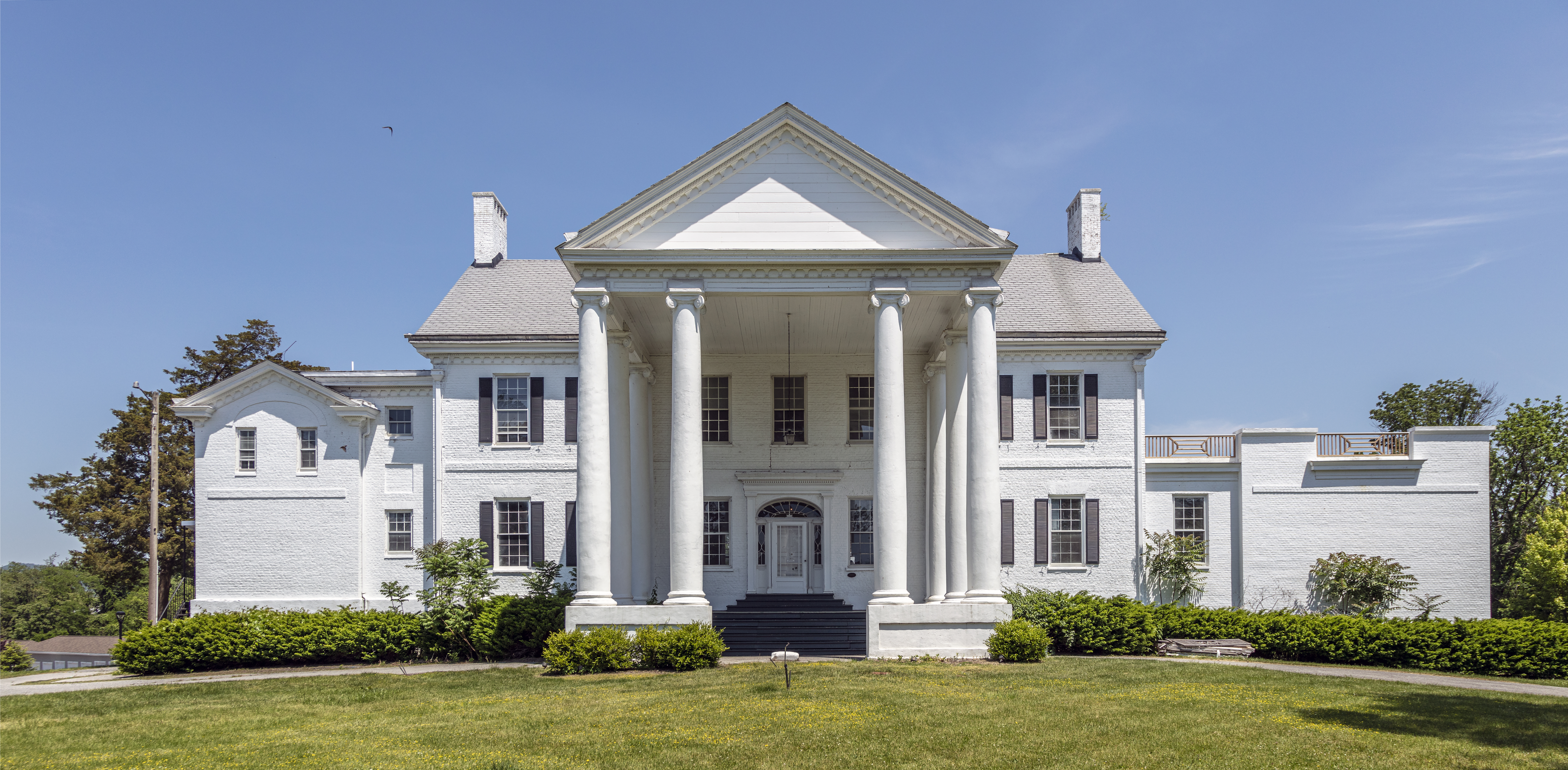
Prospect Hall, McLean's birthplace

McLean was born Emily Nelson Ritchie on January 28, 1859, at Prospect Hall, the home of her grandparents in Frederick, Maryland. She was the first of eighteen children born to John Ritchie, a lawyer and politician, and Betty Nelson Maulsby Ritchie, a civic leader.

Her paternal grandparents were Albert Ritchie, a physician, and Catharine Lackland Davis Ritchie, daughter of 2nd Lieutenant James Lackland of the Frederick County Militia. Her maternal grandparents were Colonel William P. Maulsby, son of Israel D. Maulsby, and Emily Nelson, daughter of Brigadier General Roger Nelson. She was a relative of Maryland Governor Albert Ritchie.

She first resided with her parents on the north side of W. Patrick Street in Frederick, east of Carroll Creek, where they were neighbors of Barbara Fritchie. The Ritchie family later moved a block north to 114 W. Church Street in the Court Square area of downtown Frederick, living in a large home built in 1821 by McLean's granduncle, John Nelson.

McLean was educated at Frederick Female Seminary, graduating in 1873, and continued to study history, languages, and mathematics as a post-graduate.

== Daughters of the American Revolution ==
McLean joined the Daughters of the American Revolution shortly after the society was founded, and became a charter member of the New York City chapter. She later served as a regent of the New York City chapter.

She was an active commissioner from New York to the Cotton States and International Exposition in 1895, served as an honorary commissioner at the South Carolina Exposition, and gave a public address at the Tennessee Exposition.

In November 1899, she gave a speech about patriotism at the West End Woman's Republican Association.

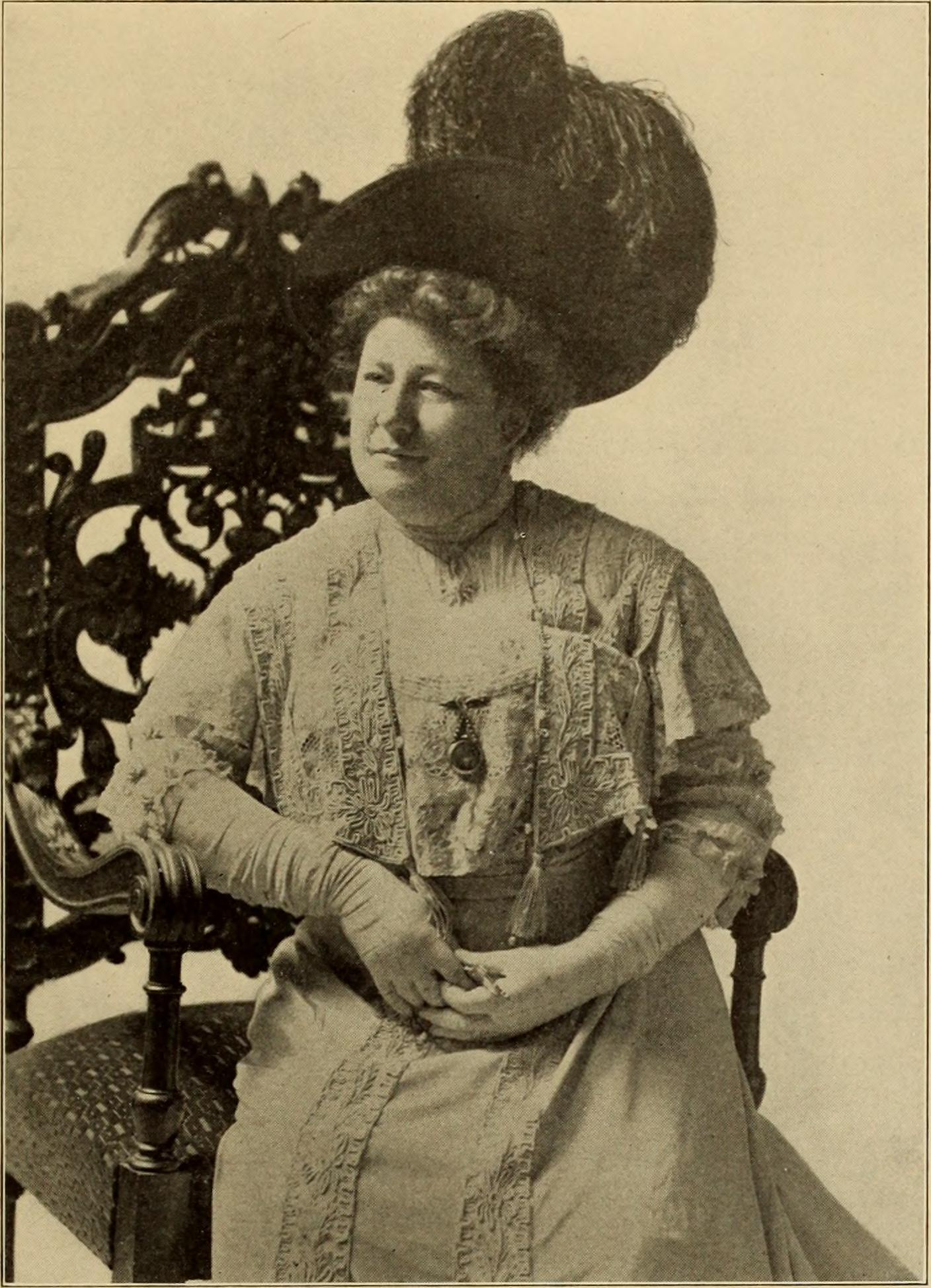
McLean in 1909

She was considered a candidate for DAR's president general in 1901 but lost to Cornelia Cole Fairbanks. On April 20, 1905, she was elected as president general during the first NSDAR Continental Congress to take place in the auditorium of Memorial Continental Hall. McLean served as the president general of the Daughters of the American Revolution for two consecutive terms, from 1905 to 1909. Upon her election as the seventh president general, it was said by members of the DAR that "Mrs. McLean is to the Daughters of the American Revolution what President Roosevelt is to the nation—a leader."

During her tenure as president general, she brought practical construction to the building of Memorial Continental Hall. She also oversaw the establishment of the DAR's first scholastic scholarship for Berry College.

== Personal life ==
She married Donald McLean, a lawyer from New York City, on April 24, 1883, at All Saints Episcopal Church. The wedding was officiated by Rev. Osborn Ingle and Bishop William Pinkney. She was the first of her sisters to be married.

She gave birth to three daughters, Elizabeth Maulsby McLean in 1852, Rebecca McCormick McLean in 1887, and Emily Nelson Ritchie McLean in 1889. The family lived in at 186 Lenox Avenue, a four-story townhouse in Harlem, Manhattan. Her husband was elected as a New York City alderman in 1881 and was later appointed by Congress to serve as General Appraiser of Merchandise for the Port of New York City under the authority of the United States Department of the Treasury.

In 1910, the family faced public scandal as her husband was accused of embezzling money given to him to invest in the Third Reformed Presbyterian Church of New York City. This scandal was followed by more accusations of mismanagement of finances in 1913 and 1914, which led to lawsuits.

In April 1916, while vacationing in Norfolk, Virginia with her brother-in-law, Rear Admiral Walter McLean, fell gravely ill. She was taken to the Church Home and Infirmary in Baltimore, where she died on May 20, 1916, from complications associated with cirrhosis of the liver. A funeral service was held on May 22, 1916, at All Saints Church, followed by a burial service at Mount Olivet Cemetery. At the time, her funeral was one of the largest to ever take place in Frederick.

== Legacy ==
The Emily Nelson Chapter of the DAR in Washington, D.C. is named in honor of McLean and her grandmother, Emily Nelson. The Emily Nelson Ritchie McLean Fund was also named in her honor.
