= Prospect Hall (Frederick, Maryland) =

Historic house in Maryland, United States

- U.S. National Register of Historic Places
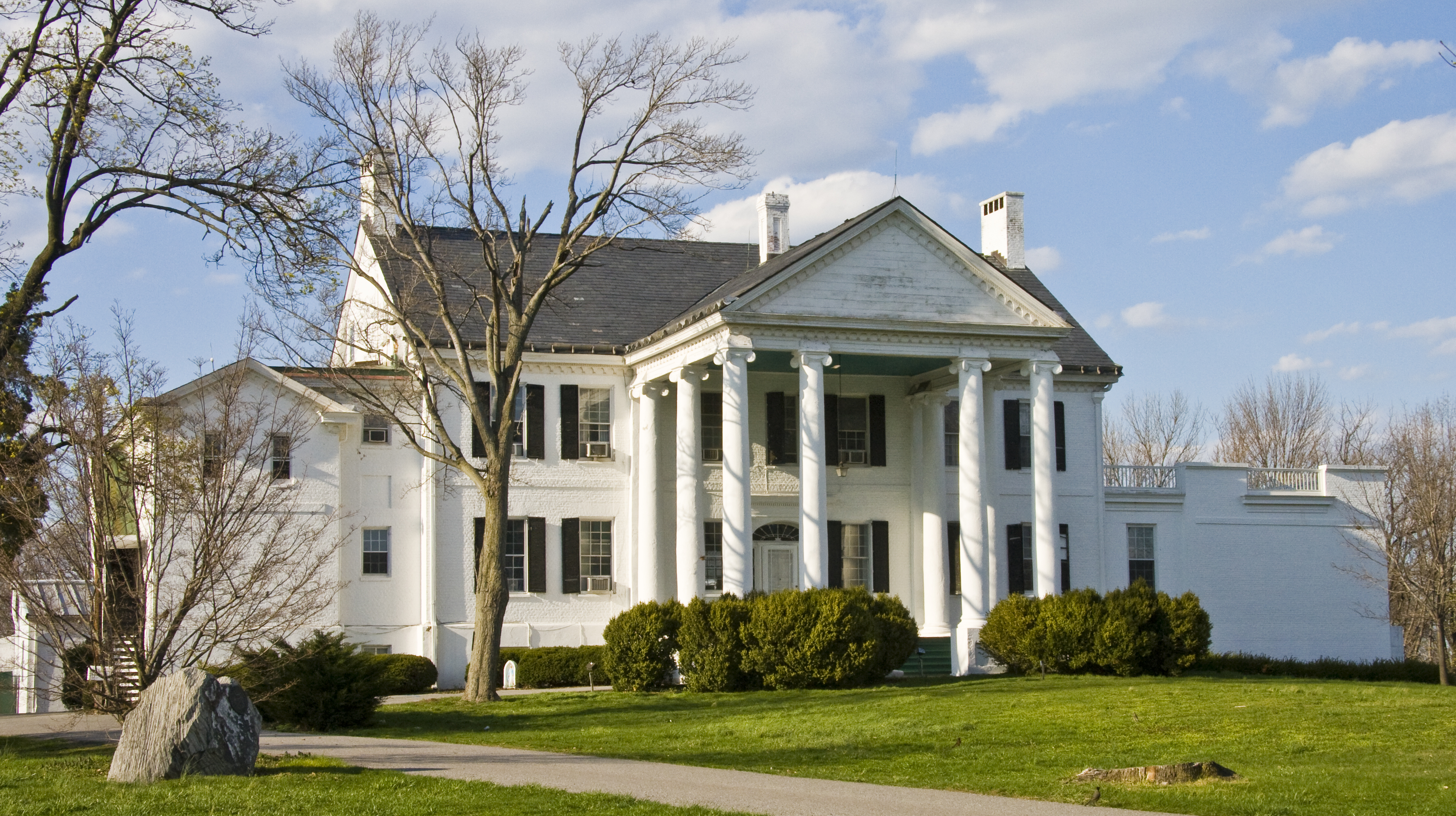

- Location within Maryland Location within the United States
- Location: 889 Butterfly Lane, Frederick, Maryland
- Coordinates: 39°24′15.372″N 77°26′25.98″W
- Area: 2.3 acres (0.93 ha)
- Built: 1800
- Architectural style: Federal
- NRHP reference No.: 80001810
- Added to NRHP: September 8, 1980

Prospect Hall is a historic mansion, built beginning around 1787 on what was known at the time as "Red Hill", the highest elevation in the area of Frederick, Maryland.

== Description ==
A major Frederick County landowner and colonial civic leader, Daniel Dulaney, built the original home on the property, which is southwest of the city of Frederick, although the current mansion known as Prospect Hall was probably not completed until 1810. This white, three story structure, designed in a Greek revival style with additional Federal elements, has hosted visitors from Presidents George Washington to Harry Truman. It was originally located on the Jefferson Pike, which led from Jefferson Street southwest out of Frederick to the town of Jefferson, Maryland, but after reconstruction and rerouting of local roads in the 1970s was situated on the adjacent facing Butterfly Lane and Himes Avenue.

== History ==
=== 19th Century ===
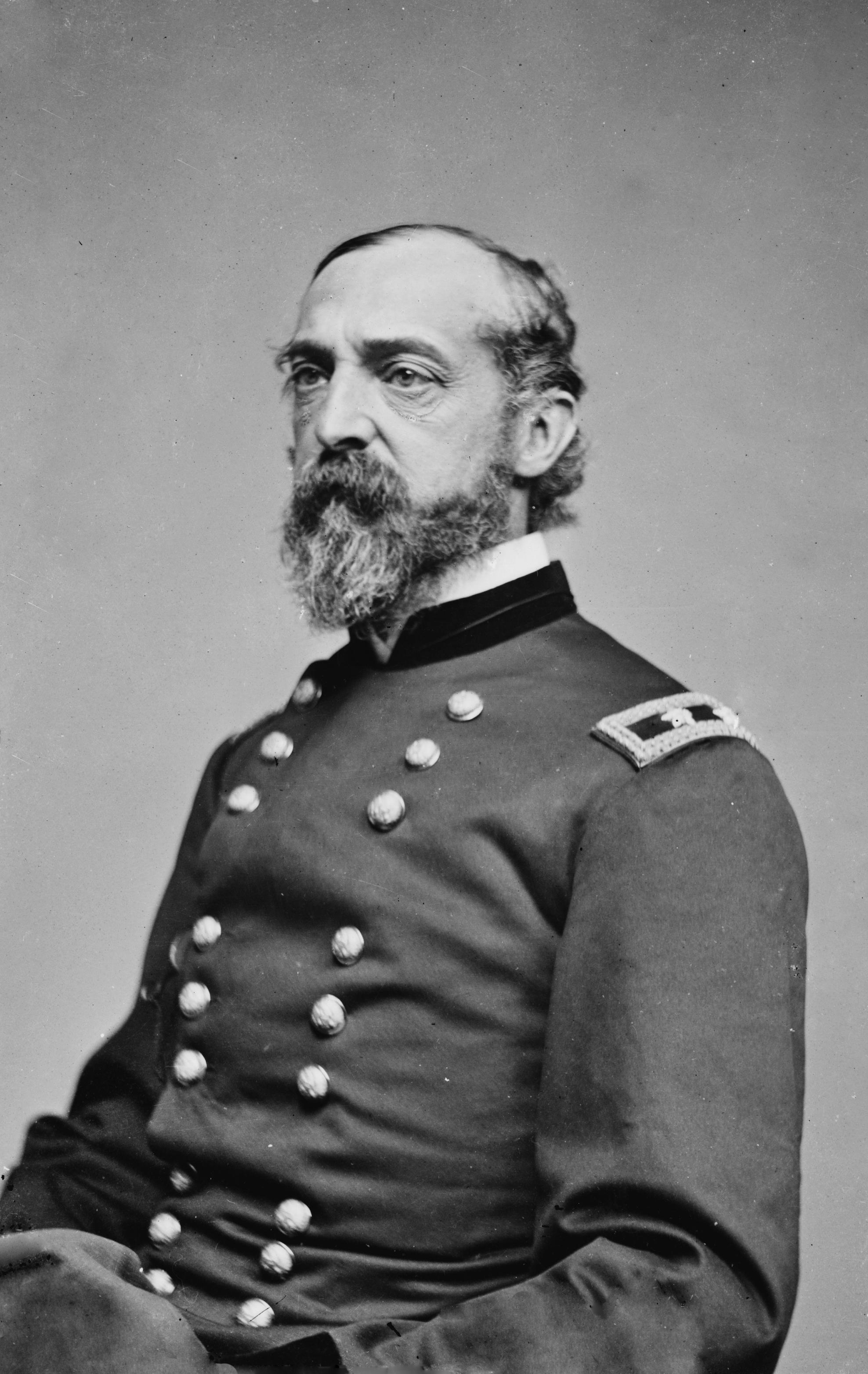
US General George G. Meade (undated) used Prospect Hall as headquarters en route to Gettysburg (1863)

The mansion was the site of General George G. Meade's takeover of command of the Army of the Potomac of the Union Army from General Joseph Hooker immediately before the Battle of Gettysburg, under last-minute orders from President Abraham Lincoln. Hooker had been defeated by General Robert E. Lee at the Battle of Chancellorsville, in Virginia, a few weeks earlier. A messenger had been sent out from Washington with the new orders but the courier had difficulty finding the command headquarters in the night. A large rectangular carved granite boulder from the Gettysburg battlefield engraved with details of the historical event was placed on the northeast corner of the property near the entrance driveway. The site is listed on the "Maryland Civil War Trails" program with internet website, illustrated site plaque marker and listed on an accompanying printed brochure.

Prospect Hall was the birthplace of Emily Nelson Ritchie McLean.

=== 20th Century ===
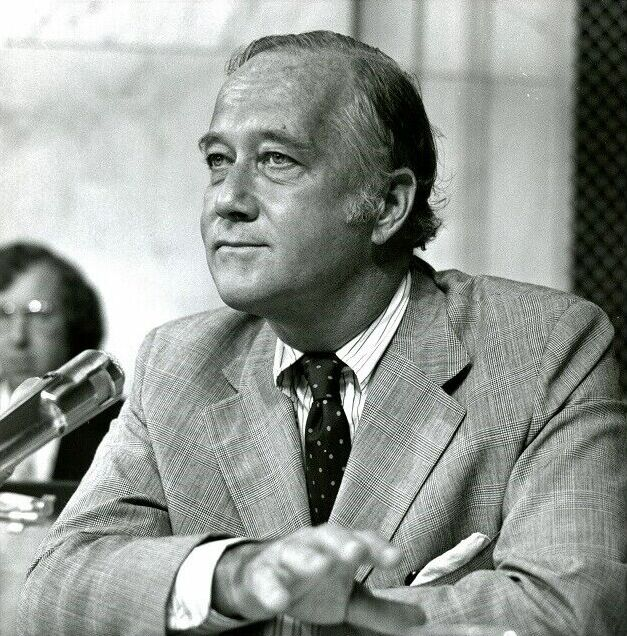
US Senator Charles Mathias (undated) spoke at the Sesquicentennial celebration in 1979

During the middle 20th Century, the historic mansion was owned and occupied by U.S. Representative Joseph H. Himes.

It was later the site and campus of Saint John's Literary Institution (now known as Saint John's Catholic Prep) from 1958-1959 until January 2013, at which time the school moved to Buckeystown, MD.

In 1979, the school celebrated its Sesquicentennial (150th) anniversary:

A celebration Mass at St John the Evangelist Church followed by a reception at Prospect Hall marked the 150th anniversary of the founding of St. John's Literary Institution in 1829. The Most Rev. P. Francis Murphy, vicar of Western Maryland, was principal concelebrant, while the Rev. Edward V. Echle, pastor of St. John the Evangelist Church, and the Rev. George B. Reid, the school chaplain and pastor of St Mary's Catholic Church in Barnesville, were the main concelebrants. The Homily was given by the Rev. William Q. Simms, who graduated from St. John's in 1954 and is now pastor of St Joseph's Church in Buckeystown. Father Simms then blessed the lintel stone that was taken from the original St. John Literary Institute building when it was torn down in 1926 to make way for the present grade school. Following the Mass, the celebration then moved to Prospect Hall for a reception and blessing of the plaque marking the school's sesquicentennial by Bishop P. Francis Murphy. The principal speaker at the reception was U. S. Sen. Charles McC. Mathias, who was introduced by State Senator Edward P. Thomas. Mathias spoke about Frederick and the school during the 1820s; about the role the school had played in the community, some of its prominent leaders and the local families who had returned for generations to attend St. John's. As a native of Frederick, Mathias recalled his youth and many friendships connected with the school and Prospect Hall, when it was the home of the Himes family. Besides the alumni, students, faculty and friends of the school, many of the School Sisters of Notre Dame, the order which had staffed the school for over 50 years, returned for the celebration to be reunited with former students and the Sisters still serving at St. John Grade School. Most notably was Sr. Viviana, who originally came to Frederick in 1926 and traveled from the order's Wilton Motherhouse in Connecticut by bus to join in the day's events, where she saw many of her former students. Several priests were also concelebrants at the Mass, many of whom had served at St. John Church and taught at St. John's.

(St. John's had been founded in 1828–1829 in eastern downtown Frederick, on Second Street, in buildings from 1829 to 1925 and rebuilt in that year until the late 1950s, when the move to Prospect Hall occurred and the Second Street location was turned over to the lower grades of St. John's Elementary School.)

Nobel Prize-winning scientist D. Carlton Gajdusek, with many of his 'adopted' children, occupied "Prospect Hill" in the 1980s.

== Legacy ==
- 1979 - Sesquicentennial Celebration Ball and book
- 1980 - Listed on the National Register of Historic Places
- 2007 - A History of Prospect Hall: Student Aaron Middeke and Academic Dean Marc Minsker produced a 25-minute documentary on the historic location titled, a DVD catalogued in the Maryland Room at C. Burr Artz Library in downtown Frederick Since the school moved in 2013, the site has been redeveloped with thirteen apartment buildings built on the property.
