= Benjamin G. Shields =

American politician (1811–1892)

United States Chargé d'Affaires, Venezuela
- In office August 1, 1845 – January 2, 1850
- President: James K. Polk
- Preceded by: Vespasian Ellis
- Succeeded by: I. Nevett Steele

Member of the U.S. House of Representatives from Alabama's at-large district
- In office March 4, 1841 – March 3, 1843
- Preceded by: James Dellet
- Succeeded by: George S. Houston

Personal details
- Born: January 9, 1811 Abbeville, South Carolina, US
- Died: November 15, 1892 (aged 81) Marlin, Texas, US
- Party: Democrat; Union; Republican
- Spouse: Sarah Thomas Harwell
- Parent(s): Samuel Bayard Shields; Milley Harris Glover Shields
- Education: Franklin College

Benjamin Glover Shields (January 9, 1811 – November 15, 1892) was an American politician and a member of the United States House of Representatives from Alabama.

== Early life ==
Shields was born at his family's plantation in Abbeville, South Carolina, on January 9, 1811. He was a son of Milley Harris Glover Shields and Samuel Bayard Shields. His father was originally from Newcastle County, Delaware, but his maternal grandfather was a wealthy planter from Abbeville.

He later moved with his father to Clarke County, Alabama, and later resided at Demopolis, Alabama, in Marengo County where he completed preparatory studies, before entering Franklin College in Athens, Georgia.

== Career ==
Shields became a member of the Alabama House of Representatives in 1834.

Between March 4, 1841, and March 3, 1843, he served as a Democrat in the Twenty-seventh Congress. In 1845, he was commissioned by President James K. Polk as United States Chargé d'Affaires to Venezuela. He remained in this position until January 7, 1850.

Upon returning to the United States, he became an opponent of secession, ran unsuccessfully for Governor as a Union Democrat.

After the U.S. Civil War, Shields moved to Texas and became one of the few Republicans in Texas. From 1874 to 1879, he served as U.S. Collector of Customs at the Port of Galveston.

== Personal life ==
In April 1832, Shields was married to Sarah Thomas Harwell, a daughter of Dr. Ishmael P. Harwell. He died at his home near Marlin, Texas on November 15, 1892, as a result of a cold he caught while riding in the rain to cast his vote for president in behalf of Benjamin Harrison and for governor in behalf of Jim Hogg.

U.S. House of Representatives
Preceded by James Dellet	Member of the U.S. House of Representatives from Alabama's at-large congressional district March 4, 1841 – March 3, 1843	Succeeded by George S. Houston
Diplomatic posts
Preceded by Vespasian Ellis	United States Chargé d'Affaires, Venezuela; August 1, 1845 – January 2, 1850	Succeeded by I. Nevett Steele
