= Padlocked =

1926 film by Allan Dwan

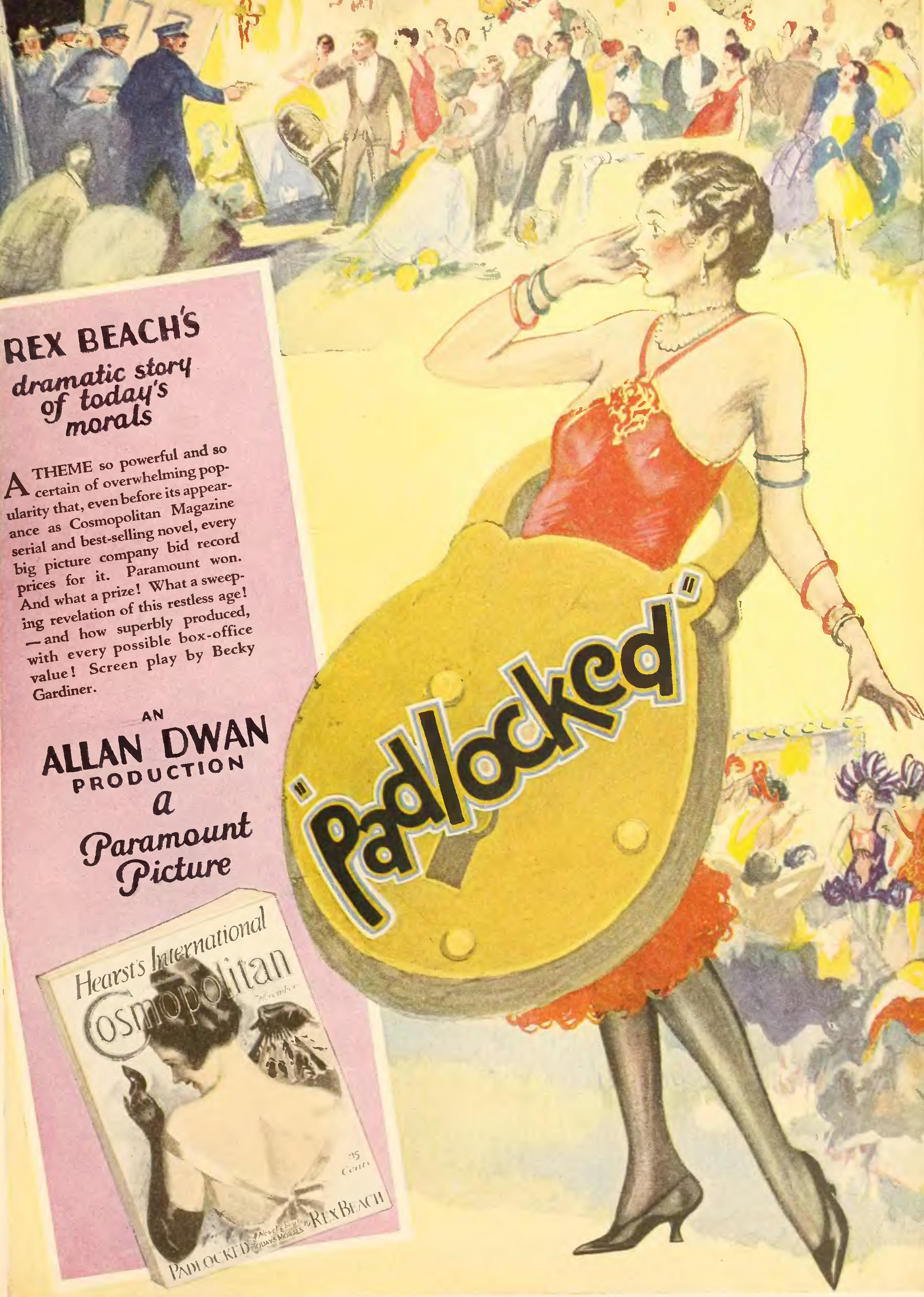
- Padlocked ad in Motion Picture News, 1926
- Directed by: Allan Dwan
- Screenplay by: Rex Beach; Becky Gardiner; James Shelley Hamilton
- Produced by: Jesse L. Lasky; Adolph Zukor
- Starring: Lois Moran; Noah Beery Sr. Louise Dresser; Helen Jerome Eddy; Allan Simpson; Florence Turner; Richard Arlen
- Cinematography: James Wong Howe
- Production company: Famous Players–Lasky Corporation
- Distributed by: Paramount Pictures
- Release date: August 2, 1926
- Running time: 70 minutes
- Country: United States
- Language: Silent (English intertitles)

Padlocked is a 1926 American silent drama film directed by Allan Dwan and written by Rex Beach, Becky Gardiner, and James Shelley Hamilton. The film stars Lois Moran, Noah Beery Sr., Louise Dresser, Helen Jerome Eddy, Allan Simpson, Florence Turner, and Richard Arlen. The film was released on August 2, 1926, by Paramount Pictures.

== Plot ==
Padlocked (1926)

Edith is the daughter of Henry Gilbert, a Christian devoted to moral reform but hypocritically infatuated with his assistant, Belle Galloway. Her life is strictly regulated - she writes her thoughts in a padlocked diary, and keeps her possessions in a "hopeless chest".

On her 17th birthday, she and her mother throw a raucous party on a day when her father is away giving a speech on moral virtue. He comes home early and finds a dress-up party in full swing. Furious, he tells his wife that she is an unfit mother and will be sending Edith away to live with relatives. During a fight, Henry knocks his wife unconscious and accidentally turns on a gas fireplace before locking her in her room, suffocating her to death.

Edith runs away to New York City and becomes a dancer in a burlesque show. Norman Van Pelt, a young patron at the club, falls in love with her, but she rebuffs his advances. She is also noticed by Monte Hermann, an elderly millionaire with an unnatural interest in teenage girls. Mr. Hermann leverages an accomplice, Mrs. Alcott, to lure both Edith and Norman to his Long Island mansion, where Norman is manipulated into believing that Edith is in a relationship with Mr. Hermann. Heartbroken, he leaves for a vacation in Europe.

Meanwhile, Henry marries Belle Galloway. He discovers that his daughter is a cabaret dancer and has her arrested by the police. The judge orders Edith to return to live with her father and new stepmother - she refuses, declaring that her mother is dead and she has no father. She is then ordered to spend 3 years at a reformatory.

Henry's new wife Belle quickly drops her moral-reformist attitudes. She gets a short flapper haircut and begins spending her husband's money lavishly. She also invites her entire family to live with her, including her alcoholic mother and lothario brother (played by a 17-year-old Douglas Fairbanks Jr.). Henry, realizing his mistake, spends half his fortune to get her and her family to leave.

Monte Hermann and Mrs. Alcott come to the reformatory and bail out a traumatized Edith, taking her to live at his mansion. When Hermann attempts to seduce her, Mrs. Alcott has a moment of moral clarity and warns Edith about his intentions. Norman Van Pelt also arrives, having been forewarned by Mrs. Alcott and recalled from Naples. Edith still has to return to the reformatory, but is released by her father, and they reconcile. She agrees to marry Norman Van Pelt and they live happily ever after.

== Cast ==
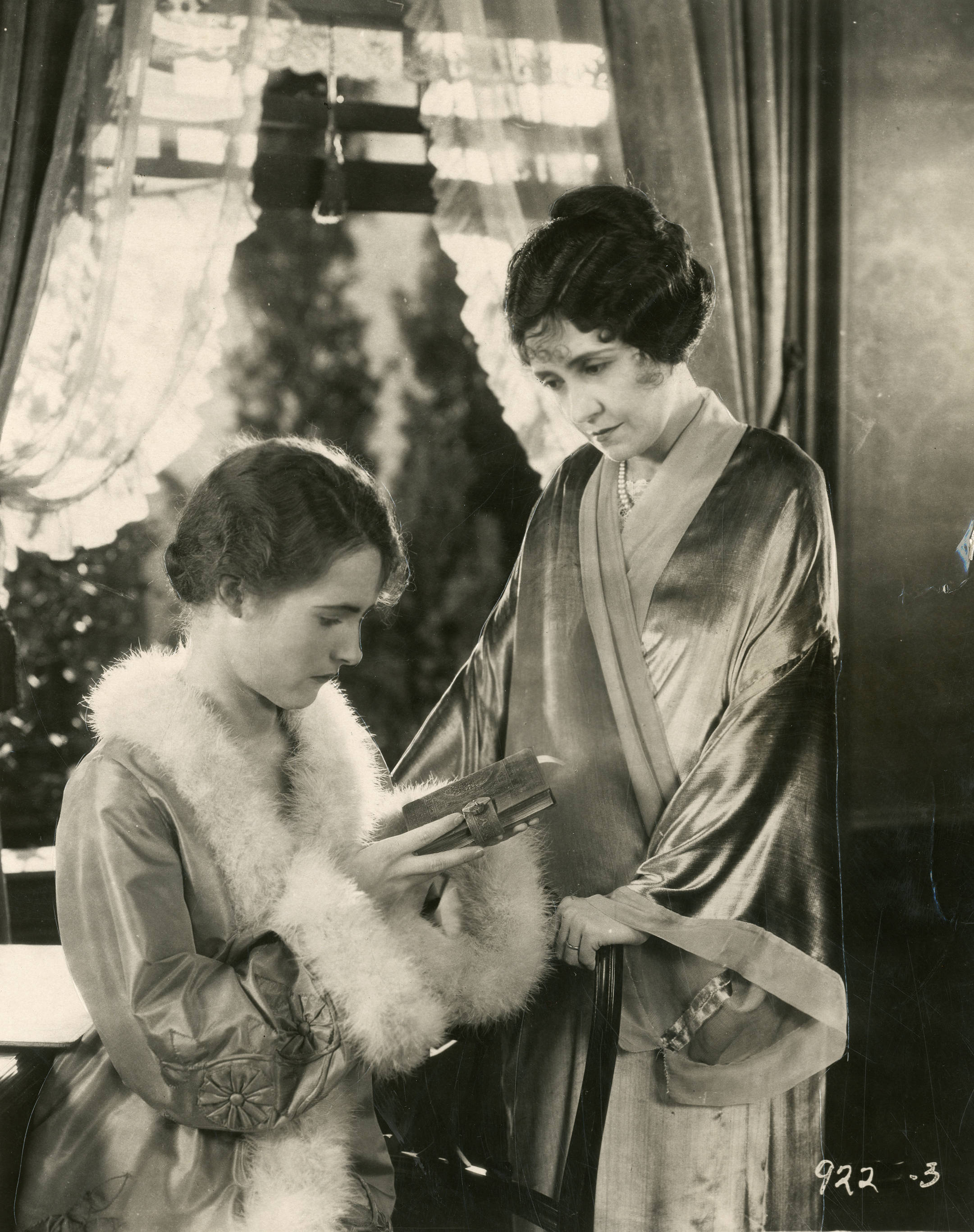
Film still of Lois Moran and Florence Turner

- Lois Moran as Edith Gilbert
- Noah Beery Sr. as Henry Gilbert
- Louise Dresser as Mrs. Alcott
- Helen Jerome Eddy as Belle Galloway
- Allan Simpson as Norman Van Pelt
- Florence Turner as Mrs. Gilbert
- Richard Arlen as 'Tubby' Clark
- Charles Lane as Monte Hermann
- Douglas Fairbanks Jr. as Sonny Galloway
- Charlotte Bird as Blanche Gallow
- Josephine Crowell as Mrs. Galloway
- André Lanoy as Lorelli
- Irma Kornelia as Pearl Gates

== Preservation status ==
A surviving print of Padlocked is in the Národní Filmový Archiv in Czech Republic. In 2023, this sole extant print was restored by the San Francisco Silent Film Festival and screened for the first time since 1926.
