= Becky Gardiner =

American screenwriter

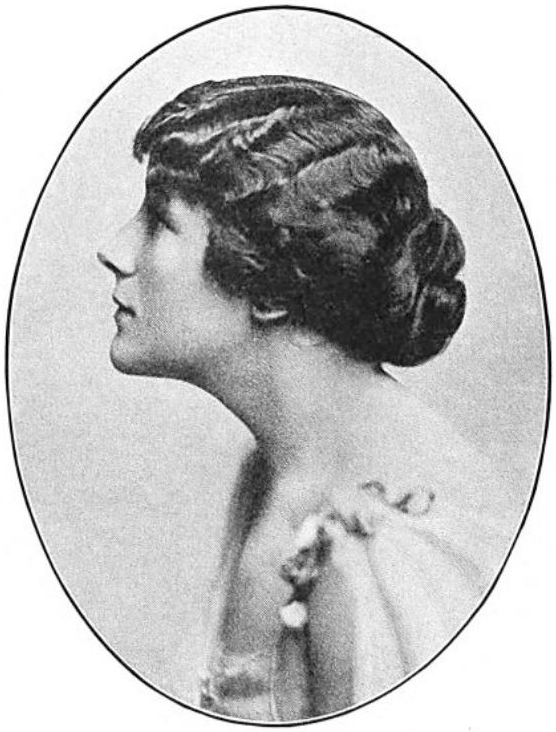
- In The Film Daily Year Book 1928
- Born: Rebeckah McCormick McLean; April 24, 1886; Maryland, US
- Education: Brearley School; Sorbonne University
- Occupations: Screenwriter, actress
- Spouses: John D. W. Gardiner (m. 1909; died 1936) Thomas H. Gillespie (m. 1949)
- Parent(s): Donald McLean (father); Emily Nelson Ritchie McLean (mother)
- Relatives: Albert Ritchie (cousin)

Becky Gardiner (born Rebeckah McCormick McLean; April 24, 1886; year of death unknown) was an American screenwriter and actress active in the 1920s and 1930s. She was noted for writing screenplays that focused on women.

== Biography ==
Gardiner was born into a prominent Maryland family; her father, Donald McLean, was a lawyer, and his wife, Emily Nelson Ritchie, was related to Maryland Gov. Albert Ritchie. On June 12, 1909, she married writer John D. W. Gardiner; they had one daughter, Emily, who became an author as well.

John died in 1936, and she remarried to Thomas H. Gillespie on March 16, 1949.

Gardiner got her start as an actress in New York City, performing in small roles in the early 1910s under the name Becky Bruce. She turned her attention to writing in the 1920s, studying in Paris at the Sorbonne and writing a column called "Footlights and Studio Lamps" for The Evening Sun; she eventually went under contract at Famous Players–Lasky, where she was the only woman on the East Coast writing staff. She also worked at Fox and Paramount.

Films for which Gardiner wrote adaptations included Sea Horses (1926) and Padlocked (1926). She also wrote the scenario for War Nurse (1930).

Her date of death is unknown.

== Selected filmography ==
- The Great Gatsby (1926)
- Padlocked (1926)
- Sea Horses (1926)
- Cabaret (1927)
- Love's Greatest Mistake (1927)
- New York (1927)
- Square Crooks (1928)
- The Sin Sister (1929)
- The Trial of Mary Dugan (1929)
- War Nurse (1930)
- A Free Soul (1931)
- Susan Lenox (Her Fall and Rise) (1931)
- Coming Out Party (1934)
- Stingaree (1934)
