= John Nelson (lawyer) =

American politician and diplomat (1791–1860)

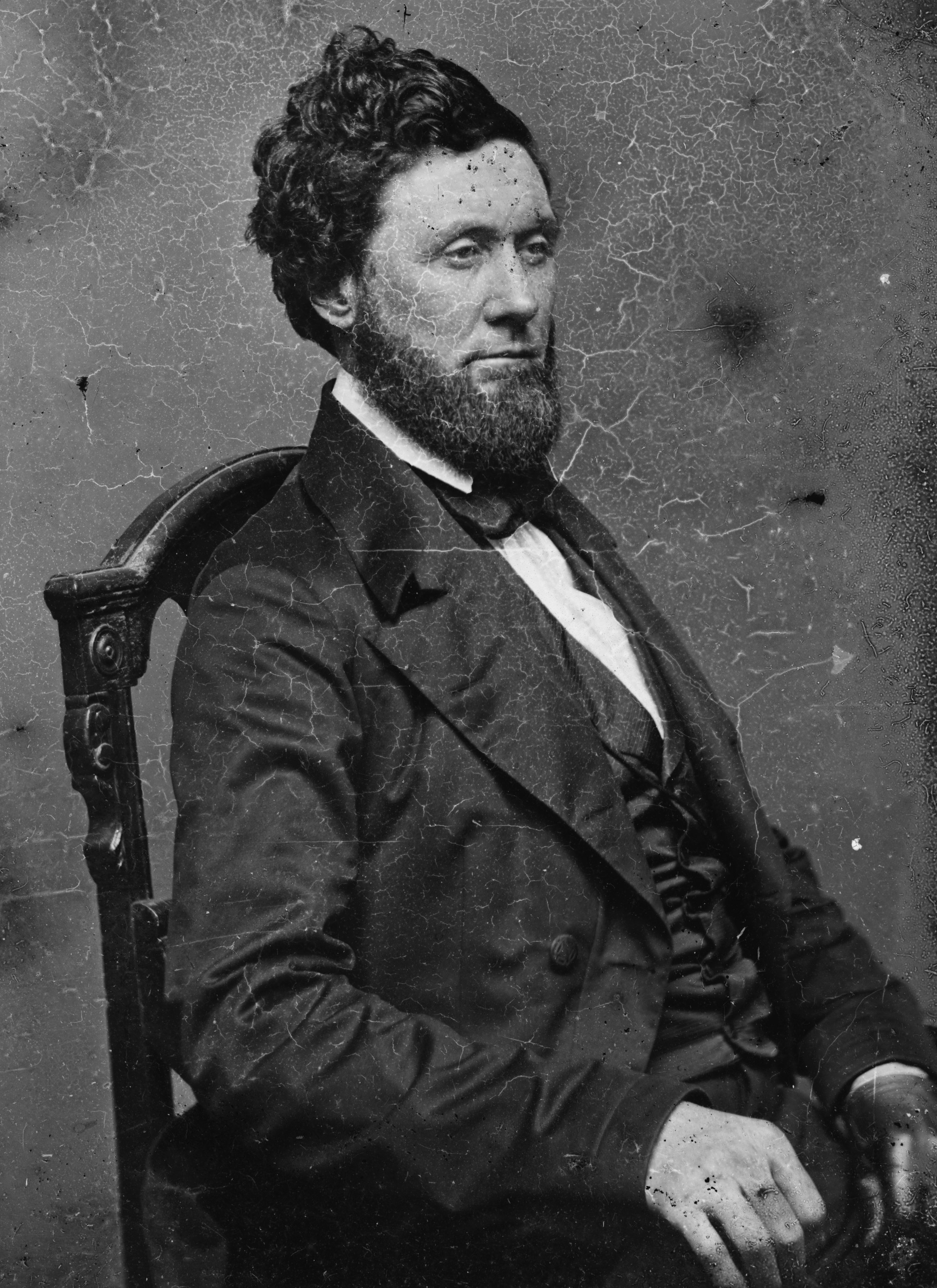

17th United States Attorney General
- In office July 1, 1843 – March 4, 1845
- President: John Tyler
- Preceded by: Hugh S. Legaré
- Succeeded by: John Y. Mason

United States Chargé d'Affaires to the Kingdom of the Two Sicilies
- In office October 25, 1831 – October 15, 1832
- President: Andrew Jackson
- Preceded by: Office established
- Succeeded by: Enos T. Throop

Member of the U.S. House of Representatives from Maryland's 4th district
- In office March 4, 1821 – March 3, 1823
- Preceded by: Samuel Ringgold
- Succeeded by: John Lee

Personal details
- Born: June 1, 1791 Frederick, Maryland, U.S.
- Died: January 18, 1860 (aged 68) Baltimore, Maryland, U.S.
- Resting place: Green Mount Cemetery
- Party: Whig
- Spouses: Frances Harriott Burrows (died 1836) Matilda Tennant (m. 1838)
- Relations: Charles Steele (grandson)
- Parent(s): Roger Nelson; Mary Brooke Sim Nelson
- Education: College of William and Mary
- Profession: Politician, Lawyer

John Nelson (June 1, 1791 – January 18, 1860) was an American lawyer and statesman who served as the Attorney General of the United States from 1843 to 1845 under President John Tyler. He served as the first United States Chargé d'Affaires to the Kingdom of the Two Sicilies from 1831 to 1832 and as the U.S. representative for Maryland's 4th district from 1821 to 1823.

== Early life ==
Nelson was born in Frederick, Maryland, on June 1, 1791. He was the fourth child of Roger Nelson and Mary Brooke (née Sim) Nelson (d. 1794). Among his siblings was Madison Nelson, Frederick Stembel Nelson, and Sarah (née Nelson) Maulsby. His father served as Brigadier general during the Revolutionary War (and one of the original members of the Society of Cincinnati) and, later, a U.S. Representative.

He graduated from the College of William and Mary in 1811, and was admitted to the bar in 1813, starting practice in Frederick.

== Career ==
He held several local offices before being elected to the United States House of Representatives representing Maryland's 4th district. He served only one term, March 4, 1821, to March 3, 1823, and was not a candidate for reelection. Nelson received an A.M. degree from Princeton University in 1825.

In 1831, he was appointed Chargé d'affaires to the Two Sicilies, a position he served in from 1831 to 1832.

President John Tyler appointed him Attorney General of the United States on July 1, 1843. He served in this position until the end of the Tyler administration. He also served as United States Secretary of State ad interim for about a month in 1844 after the sudden death of the previous Secretary of State Abel P. Upshur.

After the end of the Tyler administration, Nelson retired from public life and returned to Baltimore.

== Personal life ==
Nelson was married to Frances Harriott Burrows (1798–1836), a daughter of William Ward Burrows I, the second Commandant of the Marine Corps, and the sister of William Ward Burrows II, a decorated officer in the United States Navy. Together, they were the parents of:

- Mary Sim Nelson (1819–1880), who married Alexander Neill (1808–1865).
- Rosa Londonia Nelson (1825–1894), who married Isaac Nevett Steele (1809–1891), brother of John Nevett Steele, and Mary Nevett Steele (the wife of John Campbell Henry, eldest son and heir of Maryland Governor John Henry).

After his first wife's death in 1836, he married Matilda Tennant (d. 1862), the daughter of Thomas Tennant, on March 13, 1838. Matilda and John were the parents of two children:

- Joseph Story Nelson
- Tennant Nelson

Nelson died in Baltimore, Maryland, on January 8, 1860. He was buried in Green Mount Cemetery.

=== Descendants ===
Through his daughter, he was the grandfather of Charles Steele, who was born in Baltimore and later spent 39 years as a partner in J.P. Morgan & Co. in New York City.

U.S. House of Representatives
Preceded by Samuel Ringgold	Member of the U.S. House of Representatives from Maryland's 4th congressional district March 4, 1821 – March 3, 1823	Succeeded by John Lee
Legal offices
Preceded by Hugh S. Legaré	U.S. Attorney General; Served under: John Tyler; July 1, 1843 – March 4, 1845	Succeeded by John Y. Mason
Diplomatic posts
Preceded by (none)	United States Ambassador to Italy; October 24, 1831 – October 15, 1832	Succeeded by Enos T. Throop
