= John Ritchie (Maryland politician) =

American judge (1831–1887)

Chief Justice of the 6th Judicial Circuit
- In office March 16, 1881 – October 27, 1887
- Governor: William T. Hamilton

U.S. Representative from Maryland
- In office March 4, 1871 – March 3, 1873

Personal details
- Born: August 12, 1831 Frederick, Maryland
- Died: October 27, 1887 (aged 56) Frederick, Maryland
- Party: Democratic
- Spouse: Betty Nelson Maulsby
- Children: 18 (including Emily Nelson Ritchie McLean)
- Education: Harvard University
- Occupation: politician, lawyer, judge

John Ritchie (August 12, 1831 – October 27, 1887) was a U.S. representative from Maryland, and a judge of the Maryland Court of Appeals.

== Education ==
Born in Frederick, Maryland, Ritchie completed preparatory studies at the Frederick Academy. He commenced the study of medicine but abandoned it for the study of law at Harvard University. He was admitted to the bar and began practice in Frederick in 1854.

== Early career ==
Ritchie served as captain of the Junior Defenders (militia) and was ordered by President James Buchanan to the scene of John Brown's raid at Harpers Ferry. He also served as State's attorney for Frederick County, Maryland, from 1867 to 1871.

== Congress and judicial work ==
Ritchie was elected as a Democrat to the Forty-second Congress (March 4, 1871 – March 3, 1873). He was an unsuccessful candidate in 1872 for reelection to the Forty-third Congress, and resumed the practice of law in Frederick. He was appointed by Governor William Thomas Hamilton on March 16, 1881, chief judge of the sixth judicial circuit and associate justice of the Maryland Court of Appeals to fill the unexpired term of Judge Richard Bowie.

Ritchie was elected in November 1881 to this office for a term of fifteen years and served until his death.

== Personal life ==
Ritchie was married to Betty Nelson Maulsby, daughter of Colonel William P. Maulsby. They had eighteen children, including Emily Nelson Ritchie McLean.

He died in Frederick, Maryland on October 27, 1887 and was interred in Mount Olivet Cemetery.

U.S. House of Representatives
Preceded by Patrick Hamill	Member of the U.S. House of Representatives from Maryland's 4th congressional district 1871–1873	Succeeded by Thomas Swann
