= C. Allan Stewart =

American journalist and diplomat (1907–1973)

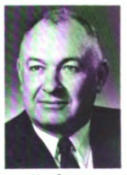

US Ambassador to Venezuela
- In office February 9, 1962 – November 28, 1964
- President: John F. Kennedy; Lyndon B. Johnson
- Preceded by: Teodoro Moscoso
- Succeeded by: Maurice M. Bernbaum

Personal details
- Born: January 27, 1907
- Died: February 23, 1973 (aged 66)
- Education: University of Arizona

Charles Allan Stewart (January 27, 1907–February 23, 1973) was an American journalist and diplomat. From 1962 to 1964, Stewart was the US Ambassador to Venezuela.

== Early life and journalist career ==
Stewart was born in Florence, Arizona. He graduated with a bachelor's degree from the University of Arizona in 1929. During his junior and senior years as a college student, Stewart worked for a newspaper in Tucson. After his graduation, Stewart worked as a reporter in Arizona and California, in Tucson, Nogales, Salinas, and Berlingame.

In 1936, he was hired by the Associated Press (AP). Originally assigned to San Francisco, Stewart was sent to New York in 1941 to work on the Latin American desk. In 1942, Stewart was assigned as AP's Chief of the Bogotá Bureau. Only a year later, he was transferred to Caracas to head the AP desk there. He stayed in Caracas for three years, ending his journalist career in 1946.

Stewart joined the Foreign Service in 1947. He served tours in Cuba, Chile, and Costa Rica. In Costa Rica, Stewart was the Deputy Chief of Mission. He was also the Deputy Director of the Office of Middle American Affairs from 1956 until September 1958. He was then promoted to Director of the Office of Central American Affairs, from September 1958 to August 1960.

== Venezuela ==
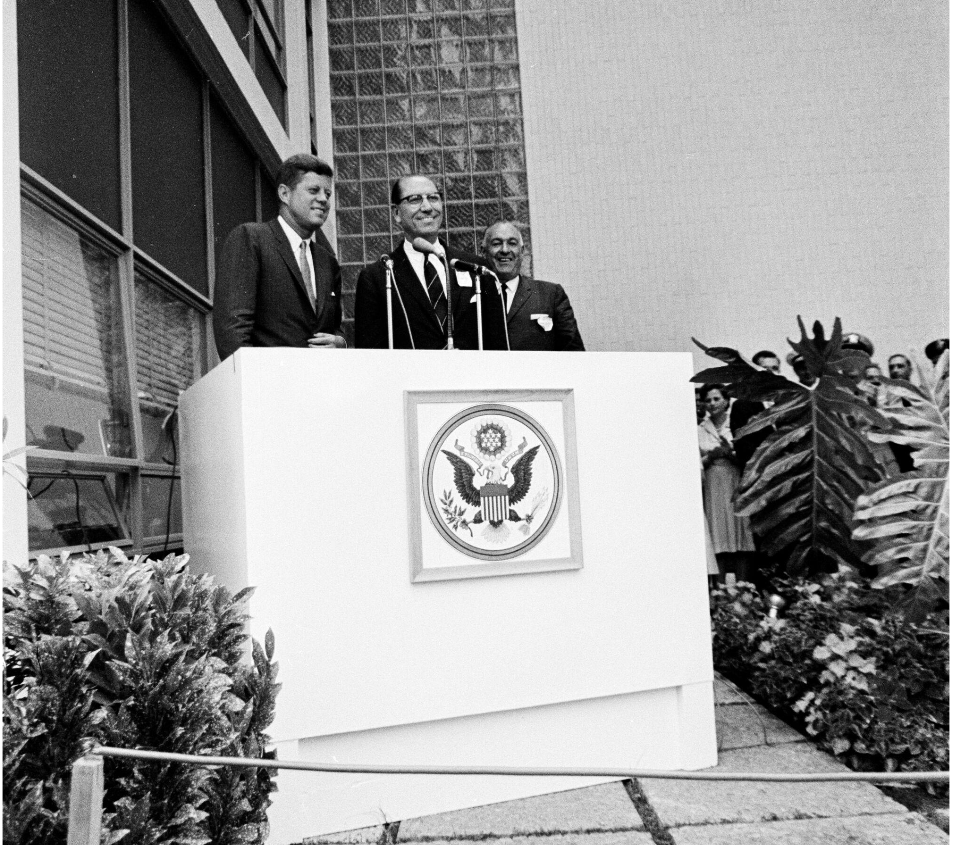
John F. Kennedy visits the US Embassy in Caracas. Teodoro Moscoso, Ambassador, is in the middle, and Stewart, Chargé d'affairs is on the right.

In 1960, Stewart was Counselor to the Embassy in Caracas. He then became Deputy Chief of Mission in Venezuela before he was promoted Chargé d'affairs. He was made chargé after Teodoro Moscoso left to head the Alliance for Progress. In 1962, Stewart was promoted from chargé to ambassador, a rare case. While Stewart was still chargé, John F. and Jacqueline Kennedy visited Caracas to show support for the democratically elected President Betancourt and to promote the Alliance for Progress. After the successful visit, Stewart was extended the position as US Ambassador to Venezuela. The Kennedy administration felt that a good relationship with Rómulo Betancourt was vital to ensuring good US–Venezuela relations despite certain Venezuelan political parties' support of communism in Cuba. Stewart had a good relationship with Betancourt even before he became the President of Venezuela in 1958, thanks to his time as a reporter in Caracas. Betancourt was also a reporter around the same time and they had a good working relationship. Betancourt also reportedly personally asked officials at Washington for the appointment of Stewart as ambassador.

The 1963 election in Venezuela was a difficult time for the Department employees working in the country. Colonel James K. Chenault, a military attaché at the embassy, was kidnapped by guerillas and held for eight days before being released, unharmed. The guerillas mistakenly believed that Chenault was related to General Claire Lee Chennault. After being taken by surprise by the kidnapping of Chenault, US embassy and Venezuelan police were more vigilant to stop further kidnappings and break-ins to embassy houses. Stewart explained later that there was a "permanent conspiracy to kidnap [him]." He therefore had a permanent guard with a police officer always in his car and two police patrol cars following him at all times. During the season ramping up to the election, Stewart ran the political office similarly to a newspaper: instructing junior officers to listen and take notes on political leaders and events without getting directly involved.

Near the end of his time as ambassador, Stewart was brought to Andrews Air Force Base Hospital due to a serious heart condition.

== Return to Washington ==
In late 1964, Stewart was transferred back to Washington, D.C. as a Special Advisor to the Office of Regional American Affairs. Only a short while later, in November 1965, Stewart was promoted to Director for the Office of Caribbean Affairs. As head of the Office of Caribbean Affairs, Stewart was charged with US relations with the Dominican Republic, Haiti, Jamaica, Trinidad and Tobago, Barbados, and Puerto Rico. On July 1, 1966, Stewart retired from the Foreign Service.

In 1968, Stewart was dispatched to San José to address Washington's concerns over Pepe Figueres' alleged ties to the Soviet Union. Stewart was chosen to directly confront Figueres because they were long time friends after Stewart was a Counselor of Embassy in San José before he was transferred to Venezuela.

== Death ==
Stewart died in 1973 at the age of 66. He had a heart attack while golfing at Caracas Country Club. Stewart's wife, Marion Selby Stewart, was murdered during a robbery five years after his death.
