= Coming Out Party =

1934 film by John G. Blystone

- Theatrical release poster
- Directed by: John G. Blystone
- Screenplay by: Jesse L. Lasky, Jr. Gladys Unger
- Story by: Becky Gardiner
- Produced by: Jesse L. Lasky
- Starring: Frances Dee; Gene Raymond; Alison Skipworth; Nigel Bruce
- Cinematography: John F. Seitz
- Edited by: Dorothy Spencer
- Music by: Score: Hugo Friedhofer; Songs: Burton Lane (music); Harold Adamson (lyrics)
- Production company: Fox Film Corporation
- Distributed by: Fox Film Corporation
- Release date: March 9, 1934
- Running time: 80 minutes
- Country: United States
- Language: English

Coming Out Party is a 1934 American Pre-Code drama film directed by John G. Blystone starring Frances Dee, Gene Raymond, Alison Skipworth and Nigel Bruce. It was produced and distributed by the Fox Film Corporation.

== Plot ==
Joy Stanhope, a Park Avenue debutante whose Coming out party is the highlight of the social calendar. Although she is linked to the very eligible bachelor Jimmy Wolverton, she is in fact in love with Chris Hansen, a violinist in a jazz band and the son of poor Swedish immigrants. She keeps secret her relationship with Hansen, knowing her parents would not approve. In fact they pressure her to go on a date with Wolverton, which enrages Hansen. After quarrelling they reunite later that night and soon after she finds herself pregnant.

She is about to tell Hansen, when he announces that he has received a "once in a lifetime" offer to tour Europe with a renowned opera singer. Unwilling to deny him this chance she keeps silent about her pregnancy. While he is away, in a daze of distress, she elopes with Wolverton and marries him. When Hansen finds out about this from the family's kindly Scottish butler he returns to America.

== Cast ==
- Frances Dee as Joyce 'Joy' Stanhope
- Gene Raymond as Chris Hansen
- Alison Skipworth as Miss Gertrude Vanderdoe
- Nigel Bruce as Troon
- Harry Green as Harry Gold
- Gilbert Emery as Herbert Emerson Stanhope
- Marjorie Gateson as Mrs. Ada Stanhope
- Phillip Trent as Jimmy Wolverton
- Jessie Ralph as Nora
- Germaine De Neel as Louise
- Paul Porcasi as Manager
- Jean De Briac as Frenchman
- Claude King as Stanhope's Attorney
