= Teodoro Moscoso =

Architect of Operation Bootstrap (1910–1992)

Teodoro Moscoso Mora
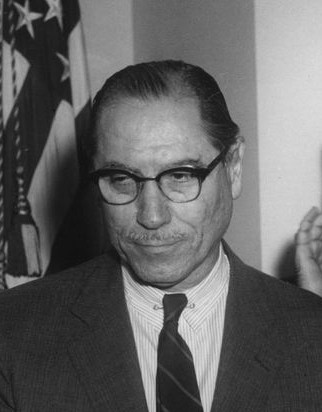
- Moscoso being sworn in as Coordinator of the Alliance for Progress and Regional Administrator for Latin America for the USAID on November 14, 1961

United States Ambassador to Venezuela
- In office May 23, 1961 – November 21, 1961
- President: John F. Kennedy
- Preceded by: Edward J. Sparks
- Succeeded by: C. Allan Stewart

Personal details
- Born: November 26, 1910 Barcelona, Spain
- Died: June 15, 1992 (aged 81) San Juan, Puerto Rico
- Party: Popular Democratic Party
- Education: University of the Sciences in Philadelphia; University of Michigan
- Profession: businessman, diplomatic corps, politician

José Teodoro Moscoso Mora (November 26, 1910 – June 15, 1992), was a Puerto Rican businessman and politician known as "the architect of Operation Bootstrap".

== Early years ==
Moscoso's parents were Teodoro Moscoso Rodriguez, the founder of Farmacias Moscoso (Moscoso Pharmacies), in Ponce, Puerto Rico, and Alejandrina Mora Fajardo, from the Balearic island of Majorca, Spain.

== Schooling ==
The Moscosos sent their son to New York City where he obtained his early education. Afterward he moved to Ponce and graduated from Ponce High School. After graduation he attended the Philadelphia School of Pharmacy (now the University of the Sciences in Philadelphia) to follow in his father's profession. After three years, he transferred to the University of Michigan, where he graduated in 1932. Moscoso returned to Ponce and worked in his father's pharmacy. The pharmacies, an island-wide chain, operated from their founding in 1915 until 1995 when they were sold to Farmacias El Amal, another local chain. He married Gloria Sánchez Vilella.

== Entry into civil service ==
Moscoso left the family business and helped win for the Ponce Housing Authority (PHA) an imperiled $2-million grant. In the midst of the Great Depression, the grant aided the construction of nearly 1,000 homes in Ponce. Moscoso's success caught the attention of various Puerto Rican government officials. In 1940, Moscoso joined the Popular Democratic Party after meeting Luis Muñoz Marín, and became instrumental in making Luis Muñoz Marín's vision of an industrialized Puerto Rico a reality.

== Economic development ==
In 1941, Rexford Guy Tugwell, Governor of Puerto Rico, and Luis Muñoz Marín, president of the Puerto Rican Senate, established a number of government-owned corporations. In 1942, Moscoso became executive director of the new agency in charge of Puerto Rico's economic development, the Puerto Rico Industrial Development Company.

Under Governor Muñoz Marín's administration, Moscoso led a project known as Operation Bootstrap. This administration realized that agriculture alone would not be able to provide employment for the burgeoning population, and sought to use the advantages of free access to the American market, plus a ready, inexpensive, and trained labor force, to rapidly industrialize the country. The country experienced rapid economic progress during the decades of 1950–1970. The ambitious project stimulated various industries through federal and local tax exemption as well as through government assistance, to invest in Puerto Rico. Moscoso, alongside British-American adverting executive David Ogilvy, succeeded in attracting worldwide capital investment to the Commonwealth; this, in turn, helped transform the island into a modern industrial society. The Economist later reported: "one century of economic development . . . achieved in a decade."

The following table shows Puerto Rico's change from agricultural to manufacturing society in terms of employment (extracted from Fernando Pico's Historia General de Puerto Rico).

Salaried employment in Puerto Rico (1940–1970) measured in thousands of employees
Decade	Agriculture and fishing	Manufacture
1940–1949	230	56
1950–1959	216	55
1960–1969	125	81
1970–1979	68	132

The implementation was not without its difficulties and Muñoz Marín adopted the practice of showing a statuette of Mahatma Gandhi to Moscoso whenever he felt that the industrialization process was being overly accelerated.

== Ambassador ==
In May 1961, United States President John F. Kennedy named Moscoso ambassador to Venezuela. One month later Moscoso was kidnaped by leftist students at the Central University of Venezuela, while his car was turned on fire. Some unattended diplomatic documents were taken from the car before it was burned.

Those documents, which contain a series of "recommendations" State Department to Venezuelan government were read on August 8, 1961, by Che Guevara, head of the Cuban delegation at Economic Conference of Punta del Este, Uruguay. On November 11 the president Romulo Betancourt ordered break diplomatic relations with Cuba. Earlier, the Mexican government had agreed to host the hundred Cuban refugees who were at the Venezuelan embassy in Havana, hoping to leave their country. In November Moscoso was named coordinator of Kennedy's Alliance for Progress and returned to Washington.

After the Kennedy assassination, Moscoso returned to Puerto Rico. In 1966, Moscoso headed the Commonwealth Oil Refining Co. ("CORCO"). From 1973 to 1976 Moscoso became again the head of "Fomento".

== Death ==
Teodoro Moscoso died on June 15, 1992.

== Legacy ==
A 2.25-kilometer bridge connecting the Hato Rey/Río Piedras sectors of San Juan, Puerto Rico with the Luis Muñoz Marín International Airport bears the name of Teodoro Moscoso. The bridge, over the San José Lagoon, is the longest bridge over a body of water in Puerto Rico. In Ponce he is honored at the Illustrious Ponce Citizens Plaza in Tricentennial Park.

== See also ==
- Economy of Puerto Rico
- List of Puerto Ricans
- History of Puerto Rico

Diplomatic posts
Preceded by Edward J. Sparks	United States Ambassador to Venezuela; May 23, 1961 – November 21, 1961	Succeeded by C. Allen Stewart
