= Charles Eames (diplomat) =

American lawyer and diplomat (1812–1867)

- Born: 20 March 1812; New Braintree, Massachusetts
- Died: 16 March 1867 (aged 54); Washington, D.C.
- Occupations: Diplomat, lawyer

Charles Eames (20 March 1812 – 16 March 1867) was an American lawyer and diplomat.

He studied at Leicester Academy, graduated from Harvard in 1831, and studied law in the Cambridge Law School, and with John Duer in New York.

Ill health prevented him from practicing his profession, and in 1845 he accepted an office in the Navy Department in Washington. A few months later he became associate editor of the Washington Union, and was appointed by President Polk to be commissioner to the Sandwich islands to negotiate a treaty. In 1850 he returned and edited the Nashville Union for six months, after which he again held charge of the Washington Union.

After several years of journalism, he was appointed minister to Venezuela by President Pierce, and remained there until 1857, when he resigned and returned to Washington, where he practiced his profession until his death. During the last five years of his life he attained a high reputation as an admiralty lawyer and for his knowledge of international law. He was a fine linguist and scholar, and possessed remarkable conversational power.
