= Nathaniel Sheldon Wheaton =

American priest (1792–1862)

Nathaniel Sheldon Wheaton (August 20, 1792 – March 18, 1862) was an American priest.

He was born in Washington, Connecticut and graduated from Yale College in 1814. He pursued a course of theological study in Maryland, where he resided four years, and was ordained by Bishop Clagett, deacon and priest in the Protestant Episcopal Church. In 1818 he was chosen rector of Christ Church, Hartford, Connecticut, and for over twelve years he discharged with marked efficiency the duties of that post. He resigned the rectorship in 1831 to become the second President of Trinity College, then called Washington College, succeeding Bishop Thomas Church Brownell. For this office he was highly qualified by his ability and learning. He had been one of the most efficient of the founders of the Institution, and while he was president he raised forty thousand dollars for its maintenance.

In 1837 he resigned the Presidency to accept the Rectorship of Christ Church, New Orleans, where he labored with fidelity seven years. During the ravages of the yellow fever, he was incessant in his devotion to the sick and dying. In 1823–4, he visited Europe, to raise funds for the new Washington College that he was involved in founding; on his return, he published a volume entitled Journal of a Residence in London, and of Tours in England, Scotland and France, (Hartford, 12mo. 1830.) He also published an expository volume, and occasional discourses. In 1844 he went abroad again.

After his second return he divided his time between Washington, his native place, and Hartford, his early home, preaching occasionally, but assuming no special pastoral charge. He bequeathed to the institution over which he presided, the sum of twenty thousand dollars. He was never married.

The degree of D. D. was conferred upon him by Yale College in 1833. He died in Marbledale, Connecticut, March 18, 1862, aged 70.

== Publications ==
- A journal of a residence during several months in London (1830)
- A discourse on St. Paul's epistle to Philemon; exhibiting the duty of citizens of the northern states in regard to the institution of slavery; delivered in Christ church, Hartford; Dec. 22, 1850
- Remarks on Washington College, and on the "Considerations" Suggested by Its Establishment
