= List of ambassadors of the United States to Venezuela =

Ambassador of the United States to Venezuela
- Seal of the United States Department of State

- Flag of a United States ambassador

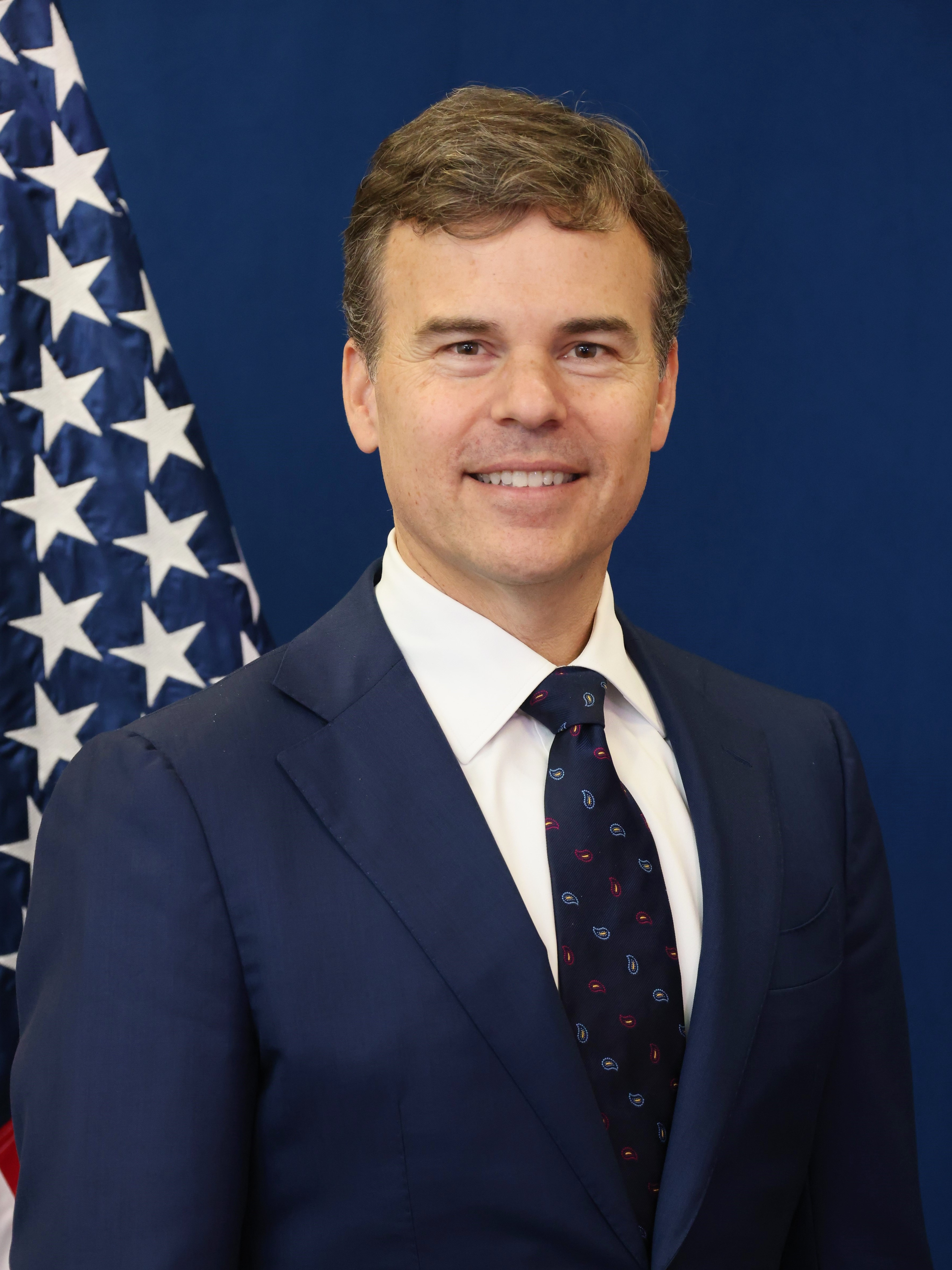
- Incumbent; John M. Barrett; Chargé d'Affaires since April 23, 2026
- Nominator: The president of the United States
- Formation: June 30, 1835
- Website: U.S. Embassy - Caracas

The following is a list of United States ambassadors, or other chiefs of mission, to Venezuela. The title given by the United States State Department to this position is currently Ambassador Extraordinary and Minister Plenipotentiary. The ambassadors are posted at the Embassy of the United States, Caracas, however due to the diplomatic conflict between the United States and Venezuela, the personnel who previously held this position worked at the Venezuela Affairs Unit from the US Embassy in Bogotá, Colombia. The United States sent a Chargé d'Affaires to Caracas after the 2026 intervention in Venezuela.

== Ambassadors ==
Representative	Title	Presentation of credentials	Termination of mission	Appointed by
B.Irvine	Chargé d'Affaires	February 14, 1819	June 29, 1835 (Note: Died at post)	Martin Van Buren
John G. A. Williamson	Chargé d'Affaires	June 30, 1835	August 7, 1840	Andrew Jackson
A. A. Hall	Chargé d'Affaires	September 22, 1841	November 29, 1844	John Tyler
Vespasian Ellis	Chargé d'Affaires	November 29, 1844	August 1, 1845	John Tyler
Benjamin G. Shields	Chargé d'Affaires	August 1, 1845	January 2, 1850	James K. Polk
I. Nevitt Steele	Chargé d'Affaires	January 7, 1850	October 18, 1853	Zachary Taylor
Charles Eames	Chargé d'Affaires	May 23, 1854	September 2, 1854	Franklin Pierce
Charles Eames	Minister Resident	September 2, 1854	September 14, 1858	Franklin Pierce
Edward A. Turpin	Minister Resident	September 21, 1858	November 16, 1861	James Buchanan
Henry T. Blow	Minister Resident	June 8, 1861 (Note: Never presented credentials)	February 22, 1862	Abraham Lincoln
Erastus D. Culver	Minister Resident	October 7, 1862	May 17, 1866	Abraham Lincoln
James Wilson	Minister Resident	October 10, 1866	August 8, 1867	Andrew Johnson
Thomas N. Stilwell	Minister Resident	December 16, 1867	June 7, 1868	Andrew Johnson
James R. Partridge	Minister Resident	July 8, 1869	May 9, 1870	Ulysses S. Grant
William A. Pile	Minister Resident	October 9, 1871	January 9, 1874	Ulysses S. Grant
Thomas Russell	Minister Resident	July 4, 1874	January 29, 1877 (Note: Venezuelan government refused to have further dealings with him.)	Ulysses S. Grant
Jehu Baker	Minister Resident	March 18, 1878	September 5, 1881	Rutherford B. Hayes
George W. Carter	Minister Resident	September 1881	May 16, 1882	Chester A. Arthur
Jehu Baker	Minister Resident	May 16, 1882	July 7, 1884	Rutherford B. Hayes (Note: Because Baker had not presented a letter of recall in 1881, he resumed his functions as Minister Resident on May 16, 1882 without reaccreditation under his original appointment.)
Jehu Baker	Minister Resident/Consul General	July 7, 1884	June 20, 1885	Chester A. Arthur
Charles L. Scott	Minister Resident/Consul General	June 24, 1885	September 18, 1888	Grover Cleveland
Charles L. Scott	Envoy Extraordinary and Minister Plenipotentiary	September 18, 1888	January 18, 1889	Grover Cleveland
William L. Scruggs	Envoy Extraordinary and Minister Plenipotentiary	May 30, 1889	December 15, 1892	Benjamin Harrison
Frank C. Partridge	Envoy Extraordinary and Minister Plenipotentiary	March 4, 1893	January 9, 1894	Grover Cleveland
Seneca Haselton	Envoy Extraordinary and Minister Plenipotentiary	July 14, 1894	May 1, 1895	Grover Cleveland
Allen Thomas	Envoy Extraordinary and Minister Plenipotentiary	July 22, 1895	June 30, 1897	Grover Cleveland
Francis B. Loomis	Envoy Extraordinary and Minister Plenipotentiary	October 6, 1897	March 25, 1901 (Note: Recall requested by Venezuelan government)	William McKinley
Herbert W. Bowen	Envoy Extraordinary and Minister Plenipotentiary	August 24, 1901	May 1, 1905	William McKinley
William W. Russell	Envoy Extraordinary and Minister Plenipotentiary	August 22, 1905	March 8, 1908	Theodore Roosevelt
Jacob Sleeper	Chargé d'Affaires ad interim (Note: The U.S. severed relations with Venezuela on June 20, 1908)	March 8, 1908	March 15, 1909	Theodore Roosevelt
William W. Russell	Envoy Extraordinary and Minister Plenipotentiary	March 15, 1909	March 24, 1910	William H. Taft
John W. Garrett	Envoy Extraordinary and Minister Plenipotentiary	March 30, 1911	October 21, 1911	William H. Taft
Elliott Northcott	Envoy Extraordinary and Minister Plenipotentiary	February 14, 1912	June 3, 1913	William H. Taft
Preston Buford McGoodwin	Envoy Extraordinary and Minister Plenipotentiary	October 22, 1913	October 5, 1921	Woodrow Wilson
Willis C. Cook	Envoy Extraordinary and Minister Plenipotentiary	February 1, 1922	May 7, 1929	Warren G. Harding
George T. Summerlin	Envoy Extraordinary and Minister Plenipotentiary	February 21, 1930	January 15, 1935	Herbert Hoover
Meredith Nicholson	Envoy Extraordinary and Minister Plenipotentiary	April 22, 1935	April 14, 1938	Franklin D. Roosevelt
Antonio C. Gonzalez	Envoy Extraordinary and Minister Plenipotentiary	May 18, 1938	February 8, 1939	Franklin D. Roosevelt
Frank P. Corrigan	Ambassador Extraordinary and Plenipotentiary	August 14, 1939	September 5, 1947	Franklin D. Roosevelt
Walter J. Donnelly	Ambassador Extraordinary and Plenipotentiary	December 1, 1947	September 2, 1950	Harry S. Truman
Norman Armour	Ambassador Extraordinary and Plenipotentiary	December 7, 1950	October 2, 1951	Harry S. Truman
Fletcher Warren	Ambassador Extraordinary and Plenipotentiary	November 21, 1951	March 24, 1956	Harry S. Truman
Dempster McIntosh	Ambassador Extraordinary and Plenipotentiary	April 26, 1956	December 27, 1957	Dwight D. Eisenhower
Edward J. Sparks	Ambassador Extraordinary and Plenipotentiary	March 19, 1958	April 15, 1961	Dwight D. Eisenhower
Teodoro Moscoso	Ambassador Extraordinary and Plenipotentiary	May 23, 1961	November 21, 1961	John F. Kennedy
C. Allan Stewart	Ambassador Extraordinary and Plenipotentiary	March 14, 1962	November 28, 1964	John F. Kennedy
Maurice M. Bernbaum	Ambassador Extraordinary and Plenipotentiary	March 4, 1965	July 9, 1969	Lyndon B. Johnson
Robert M. McClintock	Ambassador Extraordinary and Plenipotentiary	July 7, 1970	March 14, 1975	Richard Nixon
Harry W. Shlaudeman	Ambassador Extraordinary and Plenipotentiary	May 9, 1975	May 14, 1976	Gerald Ford
Viron P. Vaky	Ambassador Extraordinary and Plenipotentiary	July 26, 1976	June 24, 1978	Gerald Ford
William H. Luers	Ambassador Extraordinary and Plenipotentiary	October 9, 1978	June 28, 1982	Jimmy Carter
George W. Landau	Ambassador Extraordinary and Plenipotentiary	August 25, 1982	June 4, 1985	Ronald Reagan
Otto J. Reich	Ambassador Extraordinary and Plenipotentiary	June 6, 1986	July 17, 1989	Ronald Reagan
Kenneth N. Skoug, Jr.	Chargé d'Affaires ad interim	July 17, 1989	September 1990	George H. W. Bush
Robert C. Felder	Chargé d'Affaires ad interim	September 1990	November 19, 1990	George H. W. Bush
Michael Martin Skol	Ambassador Extraordinary and Plenipotentiary	November 19, 1990	August 23, 1993	George H. W. Bush
Jeffrey Davidow	Ambassador Extraordinary and Plenipotentiary	October 1, 1993	May 16, 1996	Bill Clinton
John F. Keane	Chargé d'Affaires ad interim	May 1996	March 1997	Bill Clinton
John Francis Maisto	Ambassador Extraordinary and Plenipotentiary	March 21, 1997	August 7, 2000	Bill Clinton
Donna Jean Hrinak	Ambassador Extraordinary and Plenipotentiary	August 25, 2000	January 23, 2002	Bill Clinton
Charles S. Shapiro	Ambassador Extraordinary and Plenipotentiary	March 19, 2002	August 31, 2004	George W. Bush
William Brownfield	Ambassador Extraordinary and Plenipotentiary	October 15, 2004 (Note: Date of Brownfield’s appointment, rather than of Presentation of Credentials.)	July 2007	George W. Bush
Patrick Duddy (Note: Ambassador Duddy was declared persona non grata and expelled by the Venezuelan government in September 2008. He was returned to his post by mutual agreement of the U.S. and Venezuelan governments in 2009. Duddy completed his tour in July 2010.)	Ambassador Extraordinary and Plenipotentiary	October 29, 2007 (Note: Date of Duddy’s swearing in, rather than of Presentation of Credentials.)	September 6, 2008	George W. Bush
John Caulfield	Chargé d'Affaires ad interim	September 6, 2008	July 1, 2009	George W. Bush
Patrick Duddy	Ambassador Extraordinary and Plenipotentiary	July 1, 2009	July 16, 2010	Barack Obama
Phil Laidlaw	Chargé d'Affaires ad interim	July 16, 2010	July 9, 2014	
M. Lee McClenny	Chargé d'Affaires ad interim	July 9, 2014	December 15, 2017	
Larry Leon Palmer (Note: On June 28, 2010, President Obama had nominated Ambassador Palmer for the post and the government of Venezuela had agreed, but December 20, 2010 the Venezuelan government revoked agreement for Ambassador-designate Palmer, which had been issued in May.)	Ambassador Extraordinary and Plenipotentiary	Not commissioned	—	Barack Obama
Todd D. Robinson	Chargé d'Affaires ad interim	December 18, 2017	May 22, 2018	Donald Trump
James B. Story	Ambassador Extraordinary and Plenipotentiary (Note: Based at the U.S. Embassy in Bogotá due to diplomatic conflict.)	July 2018	May 19, 2023	Donald Trump
Francisco Palmieri	Chief of Mission	May 19, 2023	January 20, 2025	Joe Biden
Michael A. Barkin	Chargé d'Affaires ad interim	January 20, 2025	February 1, 2025	Donald Trump
John McNamara	Chargé d'Affaires ad interim	February 1, 2025	January 21, 2026	Donald Trump
Laura Farnsworth Dogu	Chargé d'Affaires ad interim	January 22, 2026	April 15, 2026	Donald Trump
John M. Barrett	Chargé d'Affaires ad interim	April 23, 2026	Present	Donald Trump

== See also ==
- United States – Venezuela relations
- Foreign relations of Venezuela
- Ambassadors of the United States
