= Charles von Stade =

American polo player

- Born: November 24, 1919; Old Westbury, Long Island
- Died: April 10, 1945 (aged 25); Germany
- Cause of death: Killed in action
- Resting place: Netherlands American Cemetery and Memorial, Eijsden-Margraten, Netherlands
- Occupation: Polo player
- Spouse: Sara Worthington Clucas
- Children: Charles Steele von Stade, Jr. Frederica von Stade
- Parent(s): Francis Skiddy von Stade, Sr. Kathryn Nevitt Steele

Charles S. von Stade (Note: Sources vary on whether his full name was Charles Skiddy von Stade or Charles Steele von Stade.) (November 24, 1919 – April 10, 1945) was an American polo champion.

== Biography ==
=== Personal life ===
Charles von Stade was born in Old Westbury, Long Island, New York to Francis Skiddy von Stade, Sr. (1884–1967) and Kathryn Nevitt Steele (1896–1981). He was raised in Saratoga Springs, New York, and trained as an architect. He married Sara Worthington Clucas (1918–1983) in Gladstone, New Jersey, on January 24, 1942.

=== Polo ===
In 1941, together with John H. H. Phipps, Michael Grace Phipps and Alan L. Corey, Jr., he won the U.S. Open Polo Championship at the Meadow Brook Polo Club against the Aknusti team (Edward H. Gerry, Henry A. Gerry, George H. "Pete" Bostwick, and Elbridge T. Gerry)

=== Military service ===
Von Stade enlisted in the United States Army in March 1942 and achieved the rank of first lieutenant. During the final weeks of fighting in Europe against the Nazi regime, he was killed in action in Germany on April 10, 1945, when his Jeep ran over a land mine. He is buried at the Netherlands American Cemetery and Memorial in Eijsden-Margraten, Netherlands.

=== Elegies ===
During his time in service, Charles von Stade wrote several heart-felt letters to his wife, who was pregnant with their second child. Their daughter, Frederica von Stade, was born after he was killed in World War II, and grew to become an internationally renowned opera singer. She had long wished to turn some of the letters by her father into a song cycle. Eventually some of his words and expressions were fashioned into poems by Kim Vaeth and based on these in 1997 Richard Danielpour was commissioned to compose Elegies, a cycle of songs for mezzo-soprano, baritone, and chamber orchestra. Frederica von Stade premiered the work the following year with Thomas Hampson. According to Classics Today, "The five songs form a sort of a conversation across the gulf of time between father and daughter. The text alludes to their separation, longing for each other, and their eventual reconciliation on the spiritual plane."

Elegies has been recorded by Sony Masterworks, with Frederica von Stade, Thomas Hampson, and the London Philharmonic Orchestra and Perspectives Ensemble conducted by Roger Nierenberg.
