= John N. Steele =

American politician (1796–1853)

John Nevett Steele

Member of the United States House of Representatives from Maryland's 1st district
- In office May 29, 1834 – March 3, 1837
- Preceded by: Littleton Purnell Dennis
- Succeeded by: John Dennis

Personal details
- Born: February 22, 1796 Weston, Maryland, U.S.
- Died: August 13, 1853 (aged 57) Cambridge, Maryland, U.S.
- Party: Whig
- Spouse: Ann Ogle Buchanan
- Relations: Isaac Nevett Steele (brother); Charles Steele (nephew)
- Children: Thomas Buchanan Steele; John Nevett Steele, Jr.
- Parent(s): James Steele; Mary Nevett

John Nevett Steele (February 22, 1796 – August 13, 1853) was an American politician.

== Early life ==
Steele was born on February 22, 1796, in Weston, Maryland. He was the son of James Steele (1760–1816) and Mary Nevett (1769–1836). His many siblings included Mary Nevett Steele, who married John Campbell Henry, the eldest son and heir of Gov. John Henry, Ann Billings Steele Upshur, James Billings Steele, Henry Maynadier Steele, Catharine Sarah Maria Steele Ray, Sarah Maynadier Steele, and Isaac Nevett Steele.

He lived on an estate called "Indian Town" near Vienna, Maryland, in Dorchester County, where he completed preparatory studies. He later studied law, was admitted to the bar in 1819, and commenced practice in Dorchester County, Maryland.

== Career ==
He served as a member of the Maryland House of Delegates from 1822 to 1824, in 1829, and again in 1830. He continued to operate the family plantation, Indian Town.

Steele was elected as an Anti-Jacksonian to the Twenty-third Congress to fill the vacancy caused by the death of Littleton Purnell Dennis, and was reelected to the Twenty-fourth Congress, serving from May 29, 1834, to March 3, 1837. He was an unsuccessful Whig candidate for Governor of Maryland in 1838.

== Personal life ==
Steele was married to Ann Ogle Buchanan (1799–1839), the daughter of Thomas Buchanan (1768–1847) and Rebecca Maria Harriett Anderson (1770–1840). Together, they were the parents of:

- Dr. Thomas Buchanan Steele (1822–1905), who married Isabella Elizabeth Henry (1825–1912), granddaughter of Gov. John Henry.
- John Nevett Steele, Jr. (1824–1884), who married Ann Ogle Buchanan Henry (1842–1912), another granddaughter of Gov. John Henry.

Steele worked in agriculture until his death in Cambridge, Maryland, and is interred in Christ Protestant Episcopal Church Cemetery.

=== Descendants ===
Through his eldest son Thomas, he was the grandfather of Ogle Steele (1855–1918), Campbell Steele (1857–1884), and Mary Isabella Steele (1858–1944), who married Louis William Trail (1843–1923).

Party political offices
First	Whig nominee for Governor of Maryland; 1838	Succeeded by William Cost Johnson
U.S. House of Representatives
Preceded by Littleton Purnell Dennis	Member of the U.S. House of Representatives from Maryland's 1st congressional district May 29, 1834 – March 3, 1837	Succeeded by John Dennis
