= Francis Skiddy von Stade Sr. =

American polo player (1884–1967)

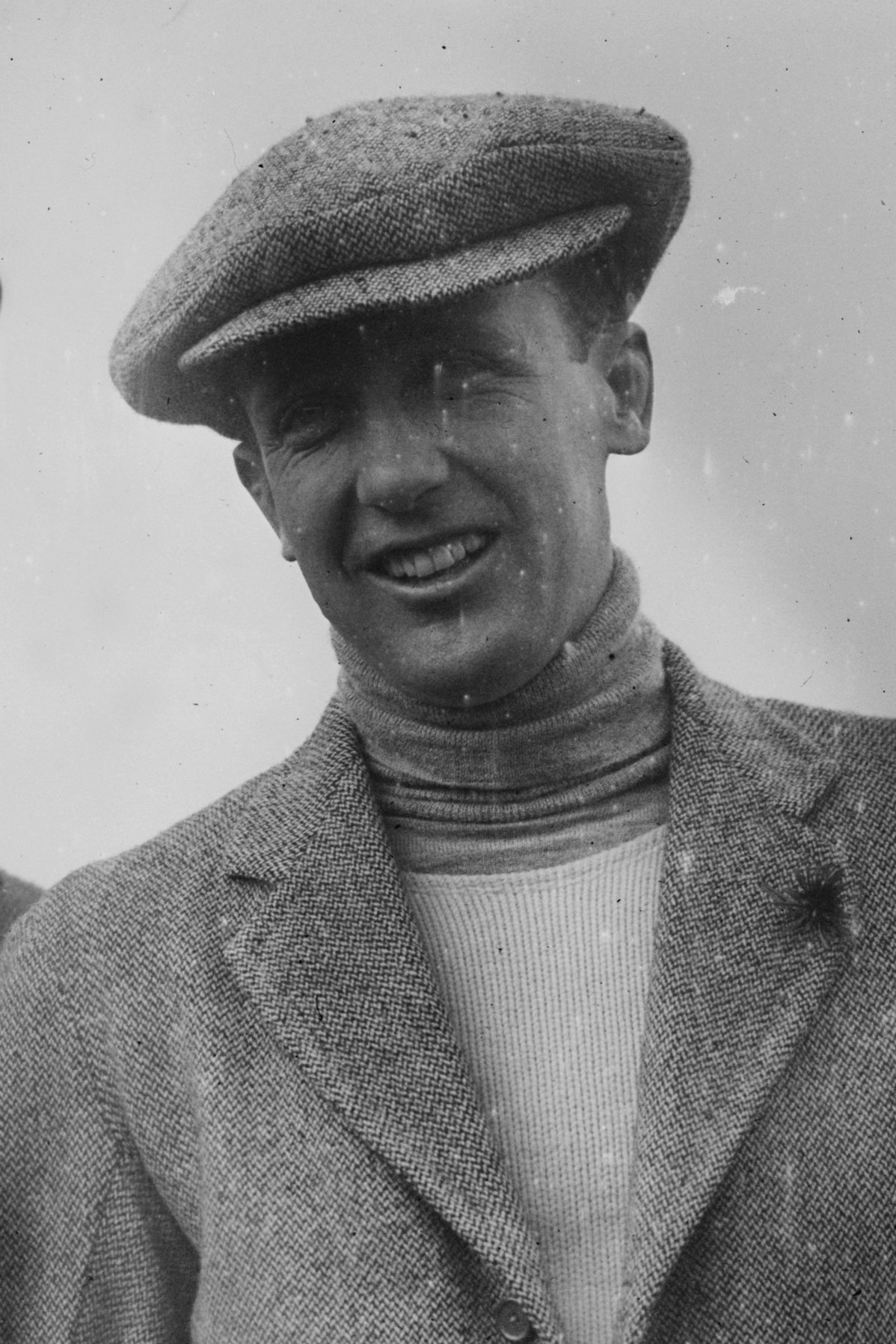
- Von Stade circa 1914

Mayor of Old Westbury, New York
- In office 1940–1950

Personal details
- Born: September 4, 1884 New York City, U.S.
- Died: February 19, 1967 (aged 82) Old Westbury, New York, U.S.
- Spouse: Kathryne Nevitt Steele (m. 1915)
- Relations: Frederica von Stade (granddaughter)
- Children: 8, including Charles
- Parent(s): Frederick Hebbert von Stade; Frances Fischer von Stade
- Education: Harvard University; Harvard Law School

Francis Skiddy von Stade (September 4, 1884 – February 19, 1967) was a champion polo player and the president of the Saratoga Association (Saratoga Race Course) from 1943 to 1955.

== Early life ==
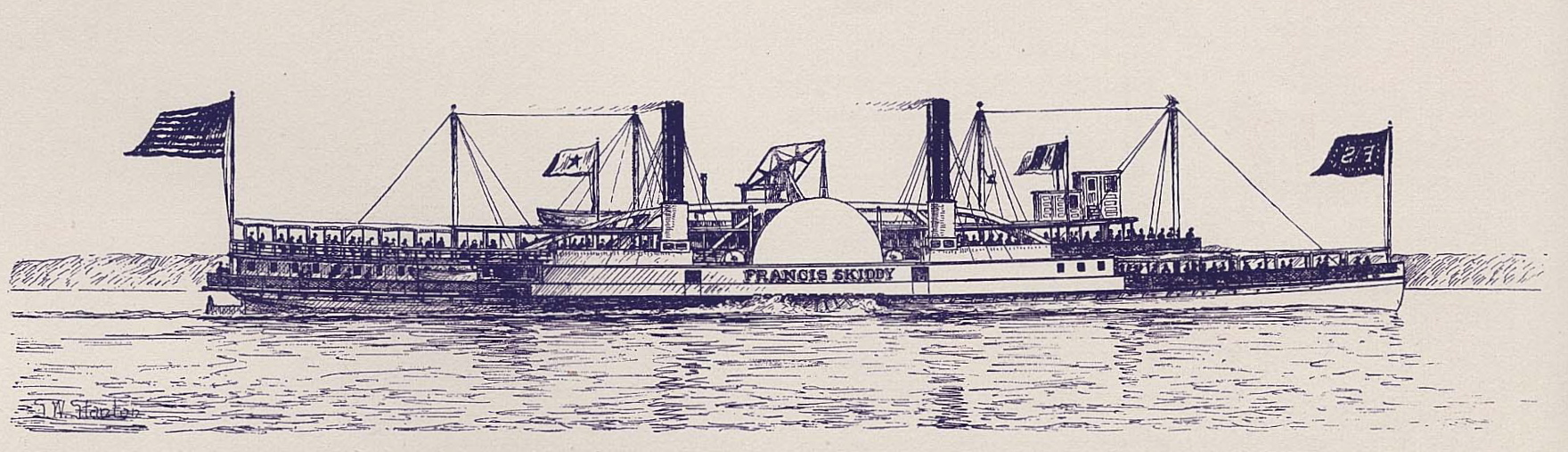
Sketch of the Francis Skiddy steamboat by Samuel Ward Stanton, c. 1895

Von Stade was born in New York City on September 4, 1884. He was the son of Frederick Hebbert von Stade (1858–1934) and Frances Sarah (née Fischer) von Stade (1859–1888). He received the name "Skiddy" from his maternal grandfather, Francis Skiddy, whose name was also on a Hudson River steamship that Currier & Ives memorably sketched.

Von Stade attended St. Paul's School in Concord, New Hampshire before Harvard University, where he graduated in 1907 before spending a year at Harvard Law School. At Harvard, he was the captain of the hockey team.

== Career ==
Like his father and paternal grandfather, F. W. von Stade, before him, he was associated with the F. W. von Stade Company, merchants who imported raw materials with an office located at 73 Beekman Street. He later worked out of an office at 63 Wall Street.

From 1940 to 1950, he served as mayor of Old Westbury and was a village trustee from 1950 until his death in 1967.

== Involvement in horse sports ==
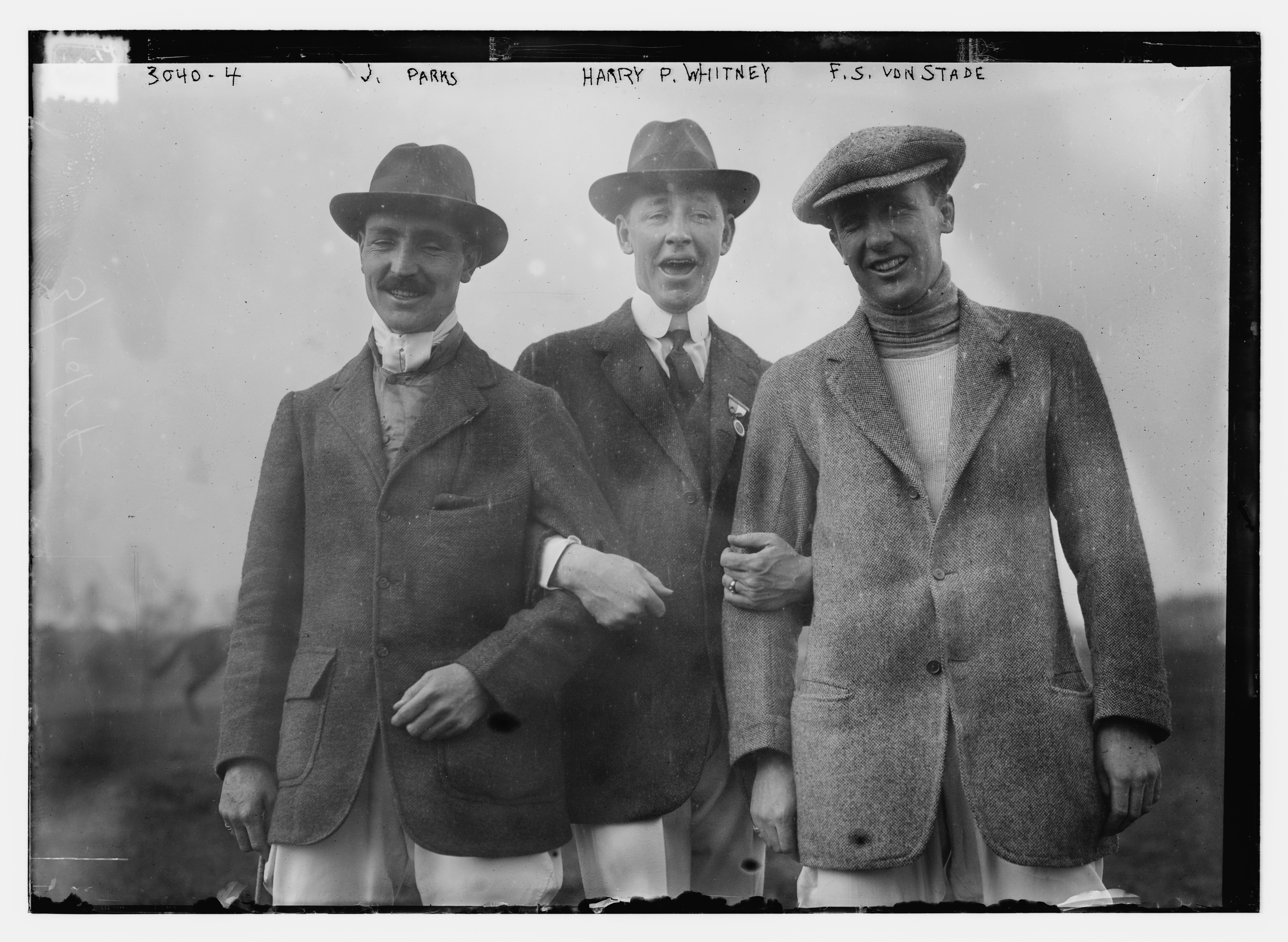
J. Parks, Harry Payne Whitney, and F. Skiddy von Stade Sr., c. 1914.

After college, he rode with the Pytchley Hunt, located near the Northamptonshire village of Pytchley in England, for six winter seasons.

Before World War I and continuing through the 1920s, von Stade was "one of the country's outstanding polo players." In 1912 and 1913, he was a member of the Cooperstown team that won the U.S. Open Polo Championship, and in 1919 and 1920, he was a member of the Meadow Brook teams, along with Devereux Milburn (who married Nancy Steele, a sister of his wife), Robert Early Strawbridge Jr., F. H. Prince Jr., and J. Watson Webb, that also won the Championship. After his retirement from polo playing, he served on the selection committee for the International Polo Cup with England (and The Hurlingham Club) in 1936, and later, refereed matches between the United States and Argentina.

From 1943 until 1954, he served as president of the Saratoga Association for the Improvement of the Breed of Horses and is credited with "keeping racing alive at the course in Saratoga Springs, the oldest flat track in the United States." After the New York Racing Association took over the Saratoga Association, he became a trustee of the new association. Von Stade was also a member of the National Steeplechase and Hunt Association (now the National Steeplechase Association), a steward of The Jockey Club (elected in 1935), and a trustee of the New York Racing Association.

In 1951, he was one of the founders of the National Museum of Racing in Saratoga Springs, New York, and served as an executive vice president until his death.

== Personal life ==
In June 1915, he was married to Kathryne Nevitt Steele (1896–1981) in the Church of the Advent in Westbury, New York with Harold Stirling Vanderbilt as von Stade's best man. His wife was a daughter of Charles Steele, a prominent lawyer who became a partner in J.P. Morgan & Co. The von Stades eventually took over the Steele residence in Southampton, New York, and commissioned society architects Cross & Cross to build them a home in Old Westbury, next door to her parents, in 1914. They also had a winter home in Aiken, South Carolina and operated a farm in Middleburg, Virginia and a plantation at Millettville in Allendale County, South Carolina. Together, they were the parents of eight children, including:

- Francis Skiddy von Stade Jr. (1916–1995), a dean at Harvard University who married Susan Russell (1918–2011) in 1939.
- Charles Steele von Stade (1919–1945), who was also a polo champion who died fighting in World War II. He married Sara Worthington Clucas in 1941.
- Dolly von Stade (1921–1998), who married George Herbert Bostwick (1909–1982). George's sister, Lillian Bostwick was married to renowned horseman, Ogden Phipps.
- Philip von Stade (1928–2004), who married Marjorie Jean Mueller (d. 2018)
- Kathryne Nevitt von Stade (d. 2007), who married William Haggin Perry (1910–1993) in 1954. They divorced and she later married John Krumpe.
- John T. von Stade (d. 2021), who served for 50 years as co-chair of the Far Hills Race Meeting Association.

Von Stade died at his home on Powell's Lane in Old Westbury, New York, on February 19, 1967. He was buried at Westbury Friends Cemetery in Westbury, New York.

=== Descendants ===
Through his son Charles, he was the grandfather of opera singer Frederica von Stade.
