= Roger Nelson (politician) =

American politician (1759–1815)

Member of the U.S. House of Representatives from Maryland's 4th district
- In office November 6, 1804 – May 14, 1810
- Preceded by: Daniel Hiester
- Succeeded by: Samuel Ringgold

Personal details
- Born: 1759 Frederick, Province of Maryland, British America
- Died: June 7, 1815 (aged 55–56) Frederick, Maryland, U.S.
- Party: Democratic-Republican
- Spouses: Mary Brooke Sim (died 1794) Elizabeth "Eliza" Harrison (m. 1794)
- Children: 5, including John and Madison
- Relatives: Emily Nelson Ritchie McLean (great-granddaughter)
- Education: College of William and Mary

Roger Nelson (1759 – June 7, 1815) was an American soldier and politician who represented the fourth district of Maryland in the United States House of Representatives from 1804 to 1810.

== Early life ==
Nelson was born on "Point of Rocks" plantation, near Frederick, Maryland. He was the son of Arthur Nelson (d. 1792).

He completed preparatory studies, and attended the College of William and Mary in Williamsburg, Virginia.

== Career ==
He served in the Continental Army during the American Revolutionary War and was wounded at the Battle of Camden and again at the Battle of Guilford Court House. Nelson was admitted as an original member of The Society of the Cincinnati in the state of Maryland and later attained the rank of brigadier general.

After the War, Nelson studied law, was admitted to the bar about 1785, and practiced in Taneytown and Frederick. He held several local offices, including serving as a member of the Maryland House of Delegates in 1795, 1801, and 1802. He also served in the Maryland Senate from November 1803 to November 1804.

Nelson was elected as a Democratic-Republican to the Eighth Congress to fill the vacancy caused by the death of Daniel Hiester, and was reelected to the Ninth, Tenth, and Eleventh Congresses, serving from November 6, 1804, until his resignation on May 14, 1810. He was one of the managers appointed by the House of Representatives in 1804 to prosecute the case in the impeachment trial of Samuel Chase, Associate Justice of the Supreme Court of the United States. He was elected associate justice of the fifth (later sixth) judicial circuit of Maryland in 1810.

== Personal life ==
Nelson was married to Mary Brooke Sim (d. 1794). Together, they were the parents of:

- Catherine Murdoch Nelson (1790–1851)
- John Nelson (1794–1860), another Maryland congressman who also served as the U.S. Attorney General.

After the death of Mary in 1794, he remarried to Elizabeth "Eliza" Harrison (1771–1855). Together, they were the parents of:

- Frederick Stembel Nelson (1803–1823)
- Madison Nelson (1803–1870)
- Sarah Nelson (1807–1880)

Nelson died in Frederick, and is interred in Mount Olivet Cemetery.

U.S. House of Representatives
Preceded by Daniel Hiester	Member of the U.S. House of Representatives from Maryland's 4th congressional district 1804–1810	Succeeded by Samuel Ringgold
