= Barton Lodge =

Historic house in Virginia, United States

- U.S. National Register of Historic Places
- Virginia Landmarks Register
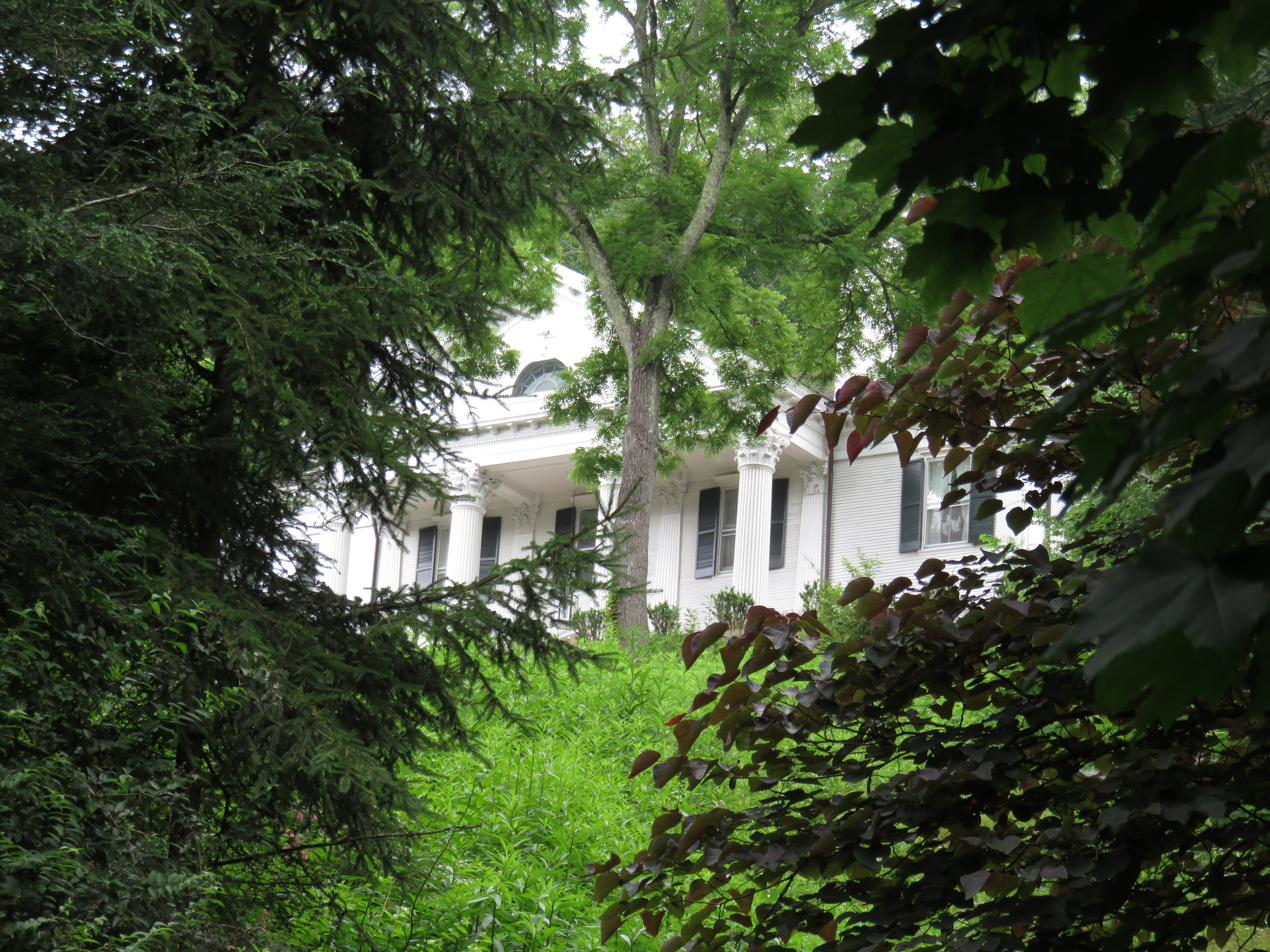

- Location within Virginia Location within the United States
- Location: 373 French's Hill Dr., near Hot Springs, Virginia
- Coordinates: 37°59′48″N 79°50′04″W
- Area: 1.7 acres (0.69 ha)
- Built: 1898-1900
- Built by: Grace & Hyde Co.
- Architectural style: Classical Revival
- NRHP reference No.: 13000984
- VLR No.: 008-0027

Significant dates
- Added to NRHP: December 24, 2013
- Designated VLR: September 19, 2013

Barton Lodge, also known as Malvern Hall and French House, is a historic home located near Hot Springs, Bath County, Virginia. It was added to the National Register of Historic Places in 2013.

== History ==
It was built in 1898–1900, and is a 2 1/2-story, five-bay, double pile, Classical Revival style frame dwelling. It features a hipped roof with two hipped-roofed dormers on the north and south elevations and a temple front featuring a pedimented portico supported by Corinthian order columns. It has a one-story, flat-roofed, four-bay west wing. The house is situated on French's Hill overlooking The Homestead.

Lettie Pate Whitehead Evans (1872–1953) purchased Barton Lodge in October 1927, and renamed it Malvern Hall. Subsequent to her death in 1953, her Foundation made a gift of the Malvern Hall property in 1961 to St. Luke's Episcopal Church in Hot Springs.
