= William Ellis =

William Ellis may refer to:

== Politicians ==
- William Ellis (14th-century MP), member of parliament for Canterbury, 1388
- Sir William Ellis (secretary of state) (died 1732), English Jacobite, secretary of State to James II in exile
- Sir William Ellis (solicitor-general) (1609–1680), English lawyer and politician
- William Craven-Ellis (1880–1959), Conservative Party politician in the United Kingdom
- William Cox Ellis (1787–1871), member of the United States House of Representatives from Pennsylvania
- William Henry Ellis (politician) (1819–1858), English-born political figure in Newfoundland
- William R. Ellis (1850–1915), United States congressman from Oregon from 1893–1899 and 1907–1911
- William T. Ellis (1845–1925), U.S. representative from Kentucky
- William Ellis (Newfoundland politician) (1857–1926), building contractor and political figure in Newfoundland
- William A. Ellis (1828–1900), member of the Wisconsin State Senate
- William Ellis (mayor), mayor of Hoboken, New Jersey
- William Ellis (Massachusetts politician), representative to the Great and General Court

== Sportsmen ==
- William Ellis (English cricketer) (1876–1931), English cricketer for Derbyshire
- William Ellis (Scottish cricketer) (1923–2015), Scottish cricketer
- William Webb Ellis (1806–1872), Anglican clergyman, allegedly the inventor of rugby football
- Billy Ellis (1895–1939), English footballer
- Bill Ellis (1919–2007), English cricketer

== Religious figures ==
- William Ellis (British missionary) (1794–1872), English missionary and author
- William Ellis (missionary in Newfoundland) (1780–1837), Irish-born Methodist clergyman, missionary in Newfoundland
- William Webb Ellis (1806–1872), Anglican clergyman, allegedly the inventor of rugby football

== Others ==
- William Ellis (astronomer) (1828–1916), English astronomer and meteorologist
- William Ellis (engraver) (1747–1810), English engraver
- William Ellis (economist) (1800–1881), English businessman, writer on economics, and educational thinker
- William Ellis (Medal of Honor) (1834–1875), American soldier and Medal of Honor recipient
- William Ellis (writer on agriculture) (1700–1758), English writer on agriculture
- Sir William Charles Ellis (1780–1839), English physician, pioneering superintendent of asylums and Methodist lay preacher
- William Ellis (actor), British actor, voice artist and podcaster
- William Henry Ellis (businessman) (1864–1923), born into slavery and became a Mexican millionaire
- William Henry Ellis (engineer) (1860–1945), British civil engineer and steel maker
- William Hodgson Ellis (1845–1920), British-Canadian chemist
- William Otoo Ellis, vice chancellor of the Kwame Nkrumah University of Science and Technology
- William Edward Ellis (1908–1982), U.S. Navy officer
- W. H. Ellis (1867–1948), justice of the Florida Supreme Court
- William Wade Ellis (1751–1779), naturalist and artist who accompanied Captain Cook
- William Ashton Ellis (1852–1919), English doctor, translator and theosophist
- William Ellis (Royal Navy officer) (1697/8—1743)

== See also ==
- William Henry Ellis (disambiguation)
- William Ellis School, a UK secondary comprehensive school for boys in Highgate, London
