= William H. Ellis =

William H. Ellis may refer to:

- William Henry Ellis (engineer) (1860–1945), British civil engineer and steel maker
- William Henry Ellis (politician) (1819–1858), English-born political figure in Newfoundland
- William Hodgson Ellis (1845–1920), British-Canadian chemist
- William Hull Ellis (1867–1948), Justice of the Florida Supreme Court
- William Henry Ellis (businessman)
