= American immigration to Mexico =

Mexican citizens of American origin

American Mexicans mexicanos estadounidenses
Total population
- 899,311 United States-born residents of Mexico (2017) 1,359 Puerto Rico-born residents of Mexico (2017) Unknown number of Mexicans of American descent

Regions with significant populations
- Guadalajara, Mexico City, Monterrey, Tijuana, Mérida, Cancún, Oaxaca, San Miguel de Allende, Puebla, Cuernavaca, San Luis Potosí, Mazatlán, Saltillo, Mexicali, Ciudad Juárez, Rosarito, Ensenada and rural regions and towns of Baja California Sur, Guanajuato, Chihuahua, Jalisco, Michoacán, Guerrero, Quintana Roo, State of Mexico, Sonora, Zacatecas, Chiapas and Tamaulipas

Languages
- Mexican Spanish, American English, Spanglish

Religion
- Protestantism, Roman Catholicism, minority of Judaism and Irreligion

Related ethnic groups
- Americans and American diaspora

American Mexicans (Spanish: mexicanos estadounidenses) are Mexicans of full or partial American heritage, who were either born in the United States (or its territories), or who descend from US migrants.

Americans represent a significant demographic group in Mexico: as of 2020, over 65% of immigrants to Mexico come from the United States. Furthermore, Mexico hosts the largest number of US emigrants. Many American Mexicans hold dual nationality, and among them are entrepreneurs, businessmen, athletes, entertainers, artists, religious ministers, academics, and students.

== History ==
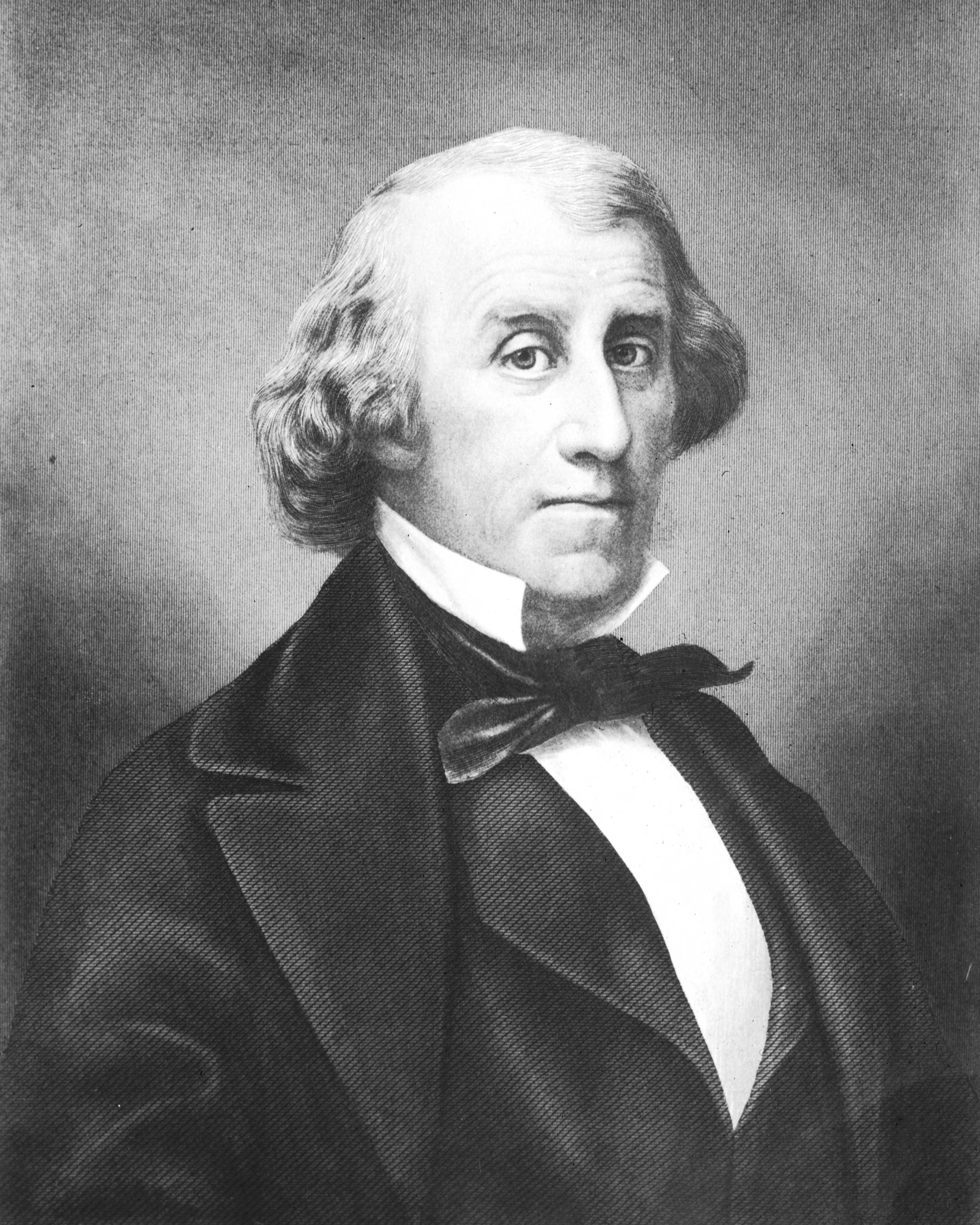
Abel Stearns, immigrant to Alta California who became one of the region's wealthiest men

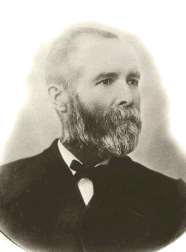
Helaman Pratt, Mormon settler and an ancestor of the Romney family

=== Early settlers ===
The first settlers to cross into Mexico from the United States were traders and fur trappers. This included settlements in the northern territories of Alta California, Santa Fe de Nuevo México and Mexican Texas. The first empresarial grant in Texas had been made under Spanish control to Stephen F. Austin, whose settlers, known as the Old Three Hundred, settled along the Brazos River in 1822. The grant was later ratified by the Mexican government. Twenty-three other empresarios brought settlers to the state, the majority from the United States. In 1824, Mexico enacted the General Colonization Law, which enabled all heads of household, regardless of race or immigrant status, to claim land in Mexico. Due to a large number of unassimilated American settlers and imported slaves, President Anastasio Bustamante outlawed further immigration of United States citizens to Texas through the Law of April 6, 1830, nonetheless immigration continued illegally.

Mexico once recognized citizens born in the territory lost in the Treaty of Guadalupe Hidalgo to protect their property, farms, and ranches. However, they had to adopt a new nationality and very few descendants had ever decided to regain their Mexican nationality.

=== Post Mexican-American War ===
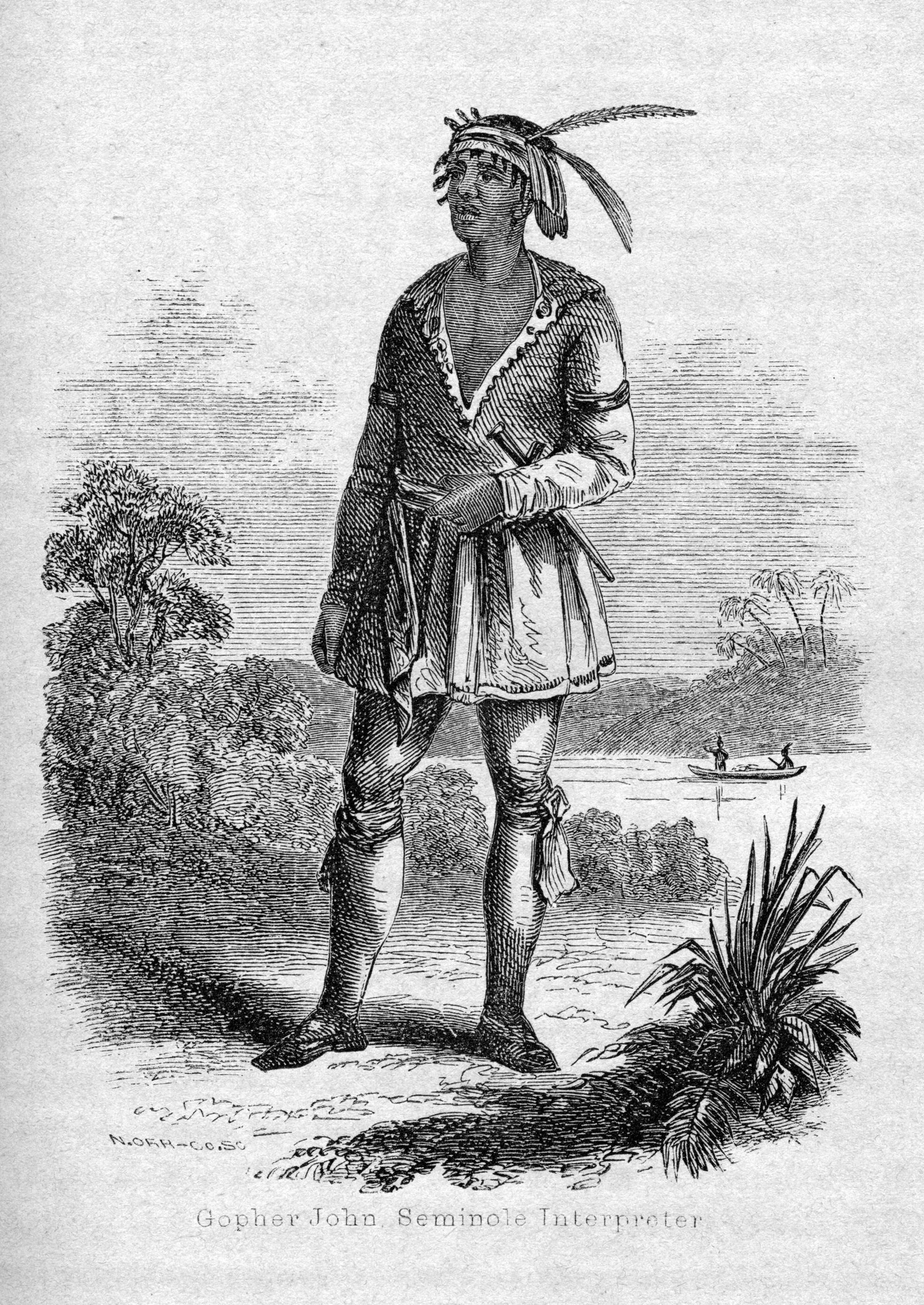
The Black Seminole leader John Horse, aka Juan Caballo

Facing the threat of enslavement, in 1850 the Black Seminole leader John Horse and about 180 Black Seminoles staged a mass escape to northern Mexico, where slavery had been abolished more than twenty years earlier. There is a band of the Kickapoo tribe present in northern Mexico as result of 19th-century migration. There is also a Cherokee Nation of Mexico that claims to be the descendants of 19th-century Cherokee migrants. However, they are not officially recognized by the Federal government.

A few of the routes of the Underground Railroad led to Mexico. An estimated 5,000 to 10,000 slaves escaped to Mexico.

In 1865 a substantial number of former Confederates fled to Mexico from the defeated Confederate States of America. They set up the New Virginia Colony. However, many of the ex-Confederates left the country once Emperor Maximilian I was overthrown.

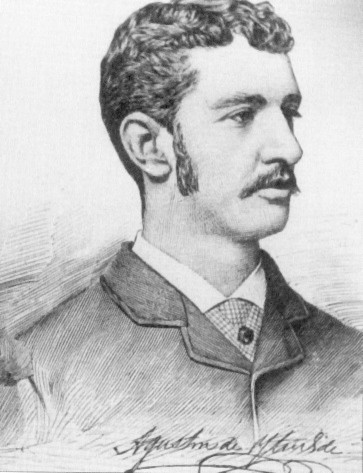
Agustin de Iturbide y Green, Head of the Imperial House of Mexico, was born to an American mother and a son of Agustín de Iturbide

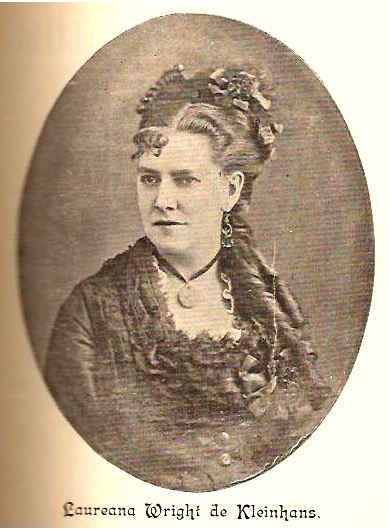
Laureana Wright de Kleinhans, daughter of an American father and Guerreran mother, was a feminist pioneer of Mexico

=== Businessmen and settlers in the Porfiriato ===
During the Porfiriato, foreign businessmen were welcomed into the country in order to help with Mexico's modernization through enterprises such as railroad construction and mineral exploitation. American capitalists included the likes of Edward L. Doheny and William Cornell Greene. Also notable among these early entrepreneurs were the Californian immigrants Walter and Frank Sanborn, who opened Mexico's first soda fountain. Their business would go on to become the Grupo Sanborns.

Founded in 1888, the American School Foundation in Mexico City was created to cater to the American immigrants of the city.

In an attempt to settle and industrialize rural areas, particularly the sparsely populated northern states, the Porfirian government encouraged organized settlements by Mexicans and foreigners. American endeavors included Los Mochis in Sinaloa, originally a utopian colony; Colonia Chamal in Tamaulipas, mostly farmers from Oklahoma; and Colonia Díaz in Chihuahua, the first Mormon colony.

A notable example of a businessman founding an American immigrant colony is William H. Ellis. He established a worker settlement in Tlahualilo, Durango for black Americans seeking to escape the Jim Crow South, however the settlement failed and most settlers returned to the United States.

A prominent Mexican of U.S. ancestry is former president Vicente Fox, whose paternal grandfather, Joseph Louis Fox, was born in Cincinnati, Ohio and emigrated to Mexico in 1897.

=== 20th century artists and leftists ===
For decades, Mexico has also drawn numerous artists, including painter Pablo O'Higgins, who participated in Mexico's muralism movement, silversmith William Spratling, who helped revitalize the silver industry in Taxco, and dancer Waldeen Falkenstein, who was influential in the teaching of modern Mexican dance. Opening in 1950, the Instituto Allende drew American art students to San Miguel de Allende and helped make the town an important destination for American emigrants.

During the Cold War, Mexico was a country of refuge for political leftists, and received various American exiles, notably from the film industry. An example was Elizabeth Catlett, prominent African-American artist who was declared an "undesirable alien" by the US government as a result of suspected Communist affiliations.

=== Recent immigrants ===
Recent migrants can be classified into three broad categories: retirees (who tend to settle in American enclaves like Ajijic or San Miguel de Allende), professionals working in Mexico (tending to reside in large cities like Monterrey or Mexico City) and the Mexican children born in America (who can be found throughout the country). These American-born minors generally follow their parents once they are deported to Mexico. Nonetheless, it is also common for adult children to return to their parents' home country of their own will.

From 2014 to 2016, 23,613 Americans received permanent residency, with a total of 72,140 Americans receiving temporary or permanent residency permits. About 600,000 US-born children live in Mexico. According to 2015 data from the National Institute of Statistics and Geography (INEGI), more than 280,000 children born in the US and now living in Mexico, do not have sufficient documentation to prove their Mexican identity.

In the 2020s, Americans taking advantage of remote work programs have contributed to the gentrification of Mexico City.

In November 2022, the U.S. Social Security Administration paid more than 62,000 individuals in Mexico, the third largest group of beneficiaries after those in Canada and Japan.

== Culture ==
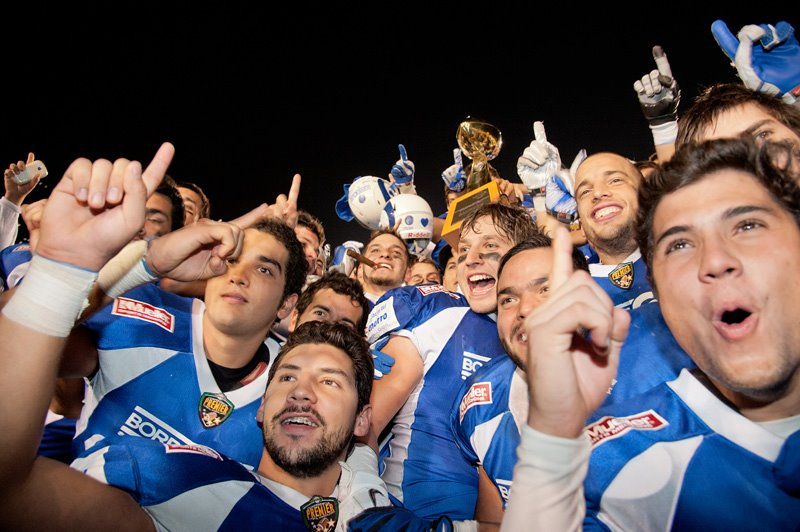
The Borregos Salvajes of Monterrey Tech celebrate their championship in the 2012 season. Mexico is one of the few countries outside the United States where American football is popular.

American Mexicans retain customs such as Thanksgiving Day and the Independence Day of the United States celebrated on July 4.

American football arrived to Mexico in 1927, by direct influence of the United States. It started to be played in Mexico City among young students from universities, and sport clubs showing a great interest for this foreign sport of considerable popularity among American students. Throughout the years, the sport became popular at an amateur level among universities of Mexico. The sport has remained popular as a result of easier access to televised MLB and NFL games and the desire of American Mexicans to partake in American pastimes.

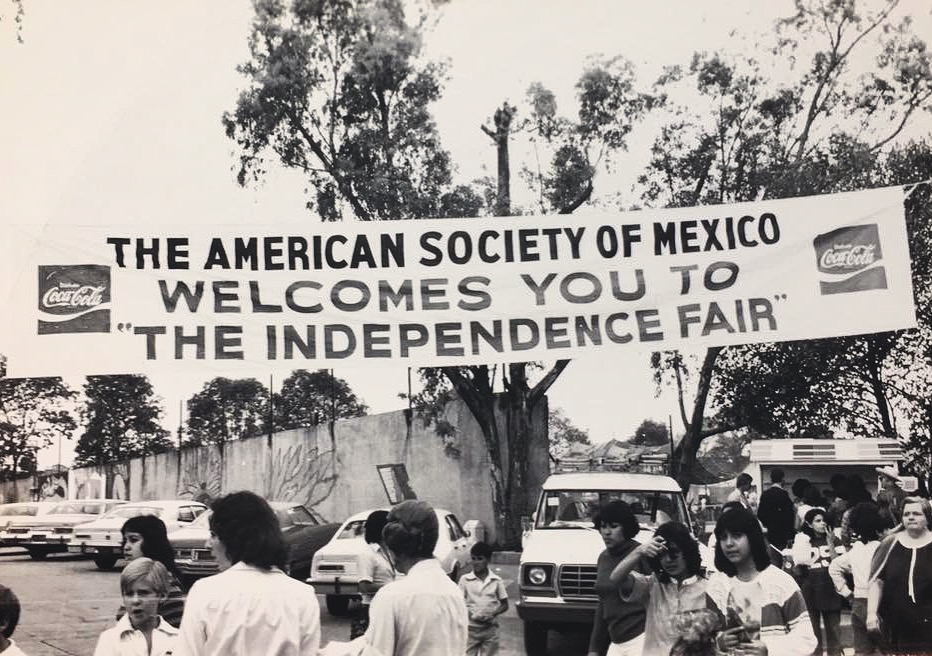
US Independence Day celebration in 1970 hosted by The American Society of Mexico

Recent migrants, especially those in the retired community, remain closely attached to and promote the values of the United States through organizations such as Democrats and Republicans Abroad, the American Legion, and the Sons and Daughters of the American Revolution. Also common among this group is the lobbying of local governments on a range of issues such as development, security, sanitation and historical preservation. This may be problematic if they are not naturalized citizens, since the Mexican Constitution prohibits the involvement of foreigners in the country's politics.

=== Language ===
Most Mexicans of American descent speak American English and Mexican Spanish, either of which can be that person's first language. However, not all in the community are proficient in both languages. Among migrants it is not uncommon to find people lacking proficiency in Spanish even after years of living in the country. This can be attributed to the relative isolation of American enclaves and the willingness of Mexicans whom they interact with to adjust to English requirements.

=== Religion ===
Most Mexicans of American descent are Christians, either Catholic, Protestant or Mormon (including both Latter-day Saints and various breakaway sects).

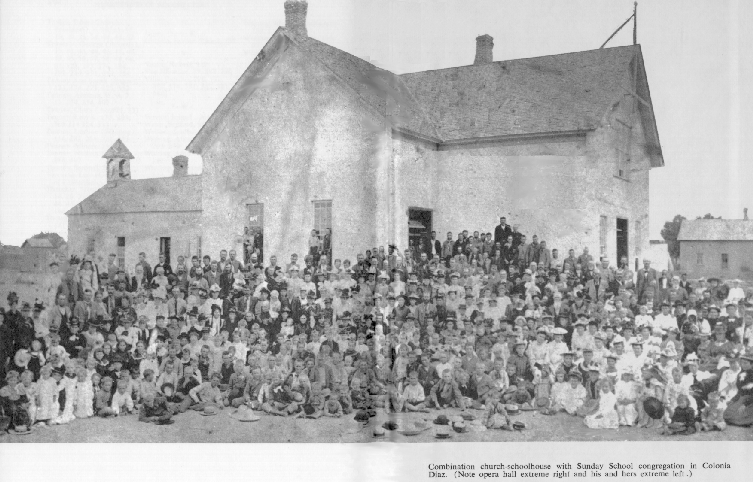
The Mormon meeting house in the Colonia Díaz.

According to the 2010 census, 314,932 individuals reported belonging to the Latter-day Saints Church. However the majority of Latter-day Saints in Mexico are ethnic Mexicans. Many Mexican Mormons of American descent reside in the Mormon colonies in Mexico, where some American Mormons settled in the late 19th century. Some of these American Mexicans or their descendants have returned to the United States since, including church leader Marion G. Romney, politician George W. Romney, and chemist Henry Eyring. More recent prominent Mexican Mormons of American descent include Carl B. Pratt, the current president of the LDS Church's Missionary Training Center in Mexico City and a former General Authority of the church. The current president of the LDS Church's Mexico Area, Daniel L. Johnson is also a Mexican of American descent, although his two counselors are both ethnic Mexicans.

There has been a small migration of American Jews into Mexico. American-born Jews established the Beth Israel Community Center in 1957, the first English-speaking congregation in Mexico and one of the first Conservative synagogues in Latin America. It was established due to cultural differences with the existing Ashkenazi and Sephardic derived Mexican Jewish community.

== Education ==
There are the following American international schools in Mexico:

Mexico City:

- Alliant International University
- ASF Mexico
- Peterson Schools
- Westhill Institute

Other cities:

- American School Foundation of Guadalajara
- American School Foundation of Monterrey
- International American School of Cancun
- Colegio Americano de Puebla
- John F. Kennedy School, The American School of Querétaro
- Colegio Americano de Torreón
- The American School of Tampico

== See also ==
- Immigration to Mexico
- Mexican Americans
- Mexican nationality law
- Mexico-United States relations
- Relinquishment of United States nationality
