= William Henry Ellis =

William Henry Ellis may refer to:

- William Henry Ellis (engineer) (1860–1945), British civil engineer and steel maker
- William Henry Ellis (politician) (1819–1858), English-born political figure in Newfoundland
- William Henry Ellis (businessman) (1864–1923), American businessman
- William Ellis (actor), British actor, voice artist and podcaster

== See also ==
- William Ellis (disambiguation)
