= Larry Rubin =

American-Mexican businessman and political activist (born 1974)

Larry David Rubin
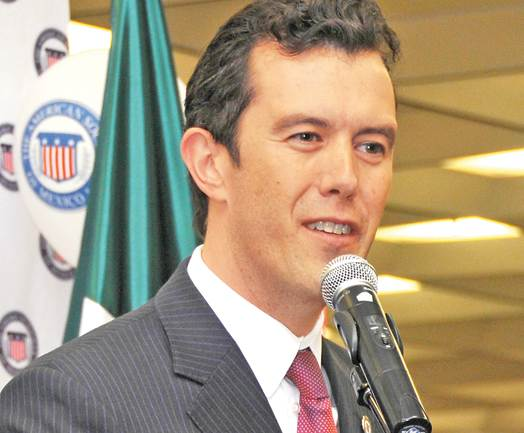
- Rubin in 2014
- Born: Larry David Rubin; August 31, 1974 (age 52); Mexico City, Mexico
- Education: American School, Mexico City, Mexico; Universidad Anáhuac, Mexico City, Mexico, Rice University, Houston, Texas USA
- Occupations: President & Chairman of The American Society of Mexico

Larry Rubin (born August 31, 1974) is a Mexican–American businessman and political activist who has lived in both Mexico City and Houston, Texas. He is the President and Chairman of the Board of The American Society and has led Republican expatriate organizing efforts.

== Early life and education ==
Born Larry David Rubin, he was raised between Mexico City and Houston. His father was from Cleveland, Ohio, and his mother is from Mexico. They both worked in the travel industry.

Rubin completed his studies through high school at the American School before obtaining a degree in business administration at Anahuac University. Rubin then went to obtain his Masters in Business Administration (Executive MBA) degree from the Jones School of Business from Rice University. There he was the recipient of the M.A. Wright Award selected by members of the graduating class for the student who best models leadership, exemplary service and significant contributions to the Jones Graduate School of Business.

== Business career ==
At age 18, he worked for US Airways, now part of American Airlines, as an airport check-in and baggage agent. He was responsible for the U.S. airline's opening of new routes to Cancún, Cozumel and Mexico City. In these destinations, he worked with local businesses and government to provide funding in order to promote passenger travel to the U.S. and Canada. He also established regular working meetings between U.S. airlines and the U.S. government in Mexico. Six years later, he became a general director within the company’s international operations.

During this time, he was also elected as the first Vice President of the National Chamber of Air Transport (representing all U.S. airlines) and on the Board of Directors of the CONFEDERACIÓN DE CÁMARAS INDUSTRIALES DE LOS ESTADOS UNIDOS MEXICANOS (the industrial chambers confederation of +110 national chambers and associations, where today he currently is a vice president) and there worked with government to lower costs for U.S. and foreign carriers and improve the working conditions of airline employees. Thereafter, Rubin became the General Director of Arizona-based direct sales company Forever Living Products in Mexico and afterwards as Partner for Chicago-based executive search firm Spencer Stuart.

Rubin is presently the Managing Partner Latin America for an executive search firm from the U.S. He has been in the executive search industry since 2012, placing officers in multinational companies. He has led American companies and organizations since 1996. He gives classes at one of the largest Mexican universities at Universidad Anahuac Mexico, where he promotes U.S. cultural heritage. Additionally he writes columns for CNN, Forbes and Reforma.

=== Trade and small business ===
Rubin has advocated publicly on cross-border trade and its economic impact, including benefits for small and medium-sized businesses. In a 2016 interview with The Dallas Morning News, Rubin described NAFTA as a “hidden jewel” that benefits small and medium businesses in the United States.

In 2024, The Dallas Morning News reported on Rubin's comments regarding U.S. investment and competitiveness, including the possibility that reforms could lead investment to shift toward Texas.

In 2016, Rubin was also cited among regional business leaders advocating for cross-border trade and economic integration.

== 2026 congressional campaign ==
In December 2025, Rubin announced his candidacy for the Republican nomination in Texas's 38th congressional district. The seat became open following the decision of incumbent Wesley Hunt to run for the United States Senate.

Rubin campaigned on issues including cost of living, border security, energy independence, and economic growth.

In February 2026, Rubin was endorsed by the Houston Chronicle editorial board in the Republican primary.

== Political work ==
=== Energy and investment competitiveness ===
In 2024, The Dallas Morning News reported on Rubin's comments regarding U.S. investment and competitiveness, including the possibility that reforms in Mexico could lead investment to shift toward Texas.

=== Mexico–U.S. relations ===
From 1997 to 2008, Rubin served in different capacities and became CEO of the American Chamber of Commerce in Mexico. He left his job at US Airways/American Airlines in 2005 to become the CEO of the American Chamber of Commerce of Mexico.

He also became Vice President of the Association of American Chambers of Commerce in Latin America. He lobbied the Mexican Congress for legislation in favor of US investment in Mexico. He has lobbied to support a bilateral relationship between the two countries through the Mexican Congress and Mexican Chamber of Deputies as he asserted cutting ties would hamper several U.S. industries. He also worked with the Mexican Federal Executive branch to lower the percentage on a new tax being proposed that would cost U.S. businesses more. He advised government against pressing double taxation on investments in Mexico. In a broader effort, Rubin lobbied Congress for approval of a tax reform benefiting business, and during the Forum on Fiscal Reform pointed out that both private sector and other actors involved had already reached agreements on tax reform that were ignored by Congress. He also promoted laws that would benefit U.S. businesses such as the changes to Mexican Social Security Institute. He worked together with Mexico's business organizations in the bilateral initiative Security and Prosperity Partnership of North America, where U.S. and Mexican businesses worked with both governments to enact regulations and laws that would benefit both. He was part of the delegation that helped pass the Mérida Initiative, a security cooperation agreement between the U.S. and the Mexican governments and the countries of Central America, with the declared aim of combating the threats of drug trafficking, transnational organized crime and money laundering. Rubin also lobbied for more security for U.S. businesses operating in Mexico, and for Congress and the Executive branch to work together to resolve this issue. Additionally he worked on regulations that he said would improve the flow of goods crossing both sides of the border, and improve delivery times of goods and services.ref name="DMN2016Trade"/> He worked with U.S. Customs and Border Protection on the legislation's implementation. He signed an agreement with the Mexican government to modify regulations under the North American Free Trade Agreement (NAFTA). He has also protected U.S. business from unnecessary legal force in Mexico, such as when the Hotel María Isabel Sheraton was closed down and he worked with the Mexican authorities to reopen it. Additionally he has protected U.S. interests from harmful effects, such as the initiative to not buy and boycott American products. He also opened dialogue with the three major parties and their candidates for President of Mexico and invited them to speak to the American investment community.

Rubin was awarded the Chamber's commerce award on six occasions for his contributions to the overall commercial relationship between Mexico and the U.S.

Presently, Rubin is the President and chairman of the Board of The American Society of Mexico, a non-profit organization that was founded in 1942, by then U.S. Ambassador to Mexico, and aims to promote U.S. business interests, traditions, American social work (NGOs) and heritage in Mexico. He also has represented the U.S. Republican Party in Mexico. Following Donald Trump's victory in the 2016 United States presidential election, Rubin urged the Mexican government to strengthen diplomatic relations with the U.S. during Trump's presidency. In November he organized the largest apolitical election night in Mexico, with thousands of people in attendance and hundreds of news outlets present.

Since 2006, Rubin has advocated for reform of immigration in the United States.

In 2007, Rubin had a professional survey done of the Mexican public, which concluded that Mexico was one of the top nations for breach of copyright and trademark. He commented that U.S. business was being hurt by the lack of enforcement in Mexico of intellectual property rights (IPR).

=== Public commentary and engagement on security and drug trafficking ===
In his role as president of The American Society of Mexico, Rubin has participated in public forums and media interviews addressing transnational security issues affecting U.S.–Mexico relations, including fentanyl and drug trafficking. In a 2023 interview with MVS Noticias, Rubin said that the United States and Mexico must coordinate efforts on issues such as fentanyl, migration, security, and arms trafficking, arguing that “no problem can be solved unilaterally.”

Rubin has also been quoted in U.S. and Mexican media discussing the impact of transnational criminal organizations on public security and bilateral cooperation. In a 2025 interview with Mexico News Daily, he stated that both countries “need to work together” to address immigration control and drug trafficking, describing Mexican drug cartels as having “tentacles all over the U.S.”

Following the designation of several Mexican cartels as terrorist organizations by the United States, Rubin said in a May 2025 press conference that U.S. actions would focus primarily on financial and legal measures rather than military intervention.

Media coverage has also noted Rubin’s participation in events and discussions linking security concerns and organized crime with economic integration and trade between the United States and Mexico.

=== Views on China and international trade ===
Rubin has publicly commented on China’s growing economic and geopolitical influence in North America, particularly in relation to trade, supply chains and energy markets with relevance to Texas and the United States. His remarks have focused on the implications of global competition for regional competitiveness and investment.

On 31 July 2024, the Chinese government, acting through its Embassy in Mexico, issued an official public statement on its verified X account that directly criticized Rubin by name. The statement rejected Rubin's comments about China, characterized his position as "presumptuous", and urged him to "abandon his prejudices" and refrain from promoting what it described as the false China threat theory".

Media coverage framed the exchange as part of broader debates over North American trade realignment and global economic competition, noting its relevance for U.S. states such as Texas whose economies are closely tied to international supply chains, manufacturing and energy production.

=== Energy reform ===
As President of The American Society of Mexico, Rubin argued for energy reform in Mexico, saying that oil prices would raise and thousands of jobs were threatened.

=== U.S. Republican Party ===
Rubin worked on the George W. Bush 2004 presidential campaign as president of the Republicans Abroad chapter of Mexico. He was asked to promote Bush to the American expatriates living in Mexico at the time.

Rubin continued working in other campaigns. He was part of the visit by candidate Sen. John McCain to Mexico in 2008 and promoted the vote for Gov. Mitt Romney in 2012.
