= Arthur William Mickle Ellis =

Professor Sir Arthur William Mickle Ellis OBE FRCP
- Born: May 4, 1883; Toronto, Ontario, Canada
- Died: May 20, 1966 (aged 83); Hounslow, Greater London, England
- Years active: 1908-1948
- Title: Regius Professor of Medicine
- Board member of: Medical Research Council, Royal Commission on Population, Birth Control Investigation Committee
- Spouse: Winifred Hadley Foot Mitchell
- Children: Timothy Mitchell Ellis
- Parent: Dr. William H. Ellis
- Relatives: Sir William Foot Mitchell (Father in Law), William Ellis (British missionary) (Great Grandfather)
- Awards: Moxon Medal, Croonian Lecture, Order of the British Empire

Academic background
- Education: BA, MD
- Alma mater: Toronto University

Academic work
- Era: 1908-1948
- Discipline: Medicine
- Institutions: Oxford University
- Main interests: Nephritis, Family planning

Sir Arthur William Mickle Ellis (4 May 1883 – 20 May 1966) was a British-Canadian physician, pathologist, and Regius Professor of Medicine at the University of Oxford (1943-1948).

== Early life ==
Ellis was born in Toronto, Ontario, Canada on 4 May 1883, the son of Dr. William H. Ellis, Professor of Applied Chemistry and Dean of the Faculty of Applied Science and Engineering in the University of Toronto and his wife Ellen Maude Mickle.

=== Early medical career ===
He was educated at Upper Canada College, and the University of Toronto, graduating BA MD in 1908.

Ellis's initial academic interest was in laboratory work and after an apprenticeship in the Sociological Laboratories in Toronto, he became demonstrator in pathology at the Western Reserve University, Cleveland, Ohio.

Ellis then became Assistant Resident Physician at the hospital of the Rockefeller Institute, New York City (1911-1914).

=== First World War ===
At the outbreak of the First World War Ellis joined the Royal Canadian Army Medical Corps, he was appointed as assistant adviser in pathology to the 4th Army, rising to the rank of Major. Ellis was mentioned in despatches four times and was awarded the OBE for his service.

== Interwar medical career in the United Kingdom ==
On demobilization at the end of the First World War (1918) he settled in London, England where he became a Member of the Royal College of Physicians in 1920. He was appointed as Professor of Medicine at London University in 1924, and Director of the Medical Unit at the Royal London Hospital.

He was elected a Fellow of the Royal College of Physicians in 1929, delivering the Croonian Lecture on The Natural History of Bright's Disease in 1941.

He made significant contributions to clinical research as a professor of medicine at the London Hospital, specifically in the field of kidney illnesses known as nephritis. He also worked on the Royal Commission on Population and was a founding member of the Birth Control Investigation Committee, which eventually became part of the Family Planning Association.

=== Second World War ===
During the Second World War Ellis became an adviser in medicine to the Ministry of Health (1941–42), and then Director of Research in Industrial Medicine for the Medical Research Council (1942–43). With the war ongoing, Ellis was appointed by King George VI as Regius Professor of Medicine at the University of Oxford in 1943, due to his reputation and breadth of experience in the fields of medical practice, research and administration.

The University of Toronto awarded Ellis an honorary Doctorate Degree in Law (LLD) in 1944.

=== Post-war career ===
Ellis remained Regius Professor of Medicine at the University of Oxford until his retirement in 1948, at the age of 65, when he was appointed as Emeritus Professor by the university.

In 1951, he was awarded the Moxon Medal of the Royal College of Physicians of London in recognition of his distinguished contribution to the knowledge of diseases of the kidney.

He was knighted in the 1953 New Years Honours by Queen Elizabeth II.

== Personal life ==
Sir Arthur William Mickle Ellis married Winifred Hadley Foot Mitchell, daughter of Sir William Foot Mitchell who was a Conservative Party Member of Parliament for Dartford and Saffron Walden, in September 1922. Their son, Timothy Mitchell Ellis, was born in St George Hanover Square, London, on 23 June 1923.

Ellis hosted a yearly boat race gathering at his home in Chiswick, with half the guests comprised London Hospital personnel, including all the consulting staff, and the other half from the diplomatic service. His hobby was salmon fishing in Iceland.

His wife died in 1965 after an extended illness. He died the following year, in London, in 1966.
