= The American Society of Mexico =

- Abbreviation: AmSoc
- Formation: Wednesday July 22, 1942; 84 years ago
- Purpose: Community, Expats, Charity
- Headquarters: Mexico City, Mexico
- Region served: Mexico
- Key people: Larry Rubin, President; Jill Metcalfe, Vice President; Patricia Gonzalez, Vice President; Fernando Gama, Treasurer; Javier Garcia-Sancho (BDO), Auditor & Commisary; Glenn Hamer, Secretary; Brian Brisson, Executive Director
- Website: http://www.amsoc.mx

The American Society of Mexico (AmSoc) is a community organization and non-profit for the greater American Community living in Mexico. The organization was established on August 26, 1942, by then-United States Ambassador George S. Messersmith and American community leaders as the American population in Mexico started to increase with the purpose to represent the American community as a whole. Messersmith became the first honorary president and all United States ambassadors have become honorary presidents of the society ever since. Over the years, the society has organized events centered around American and Mexican traditions and formed partnerships to benefit the American Community in Mexico.

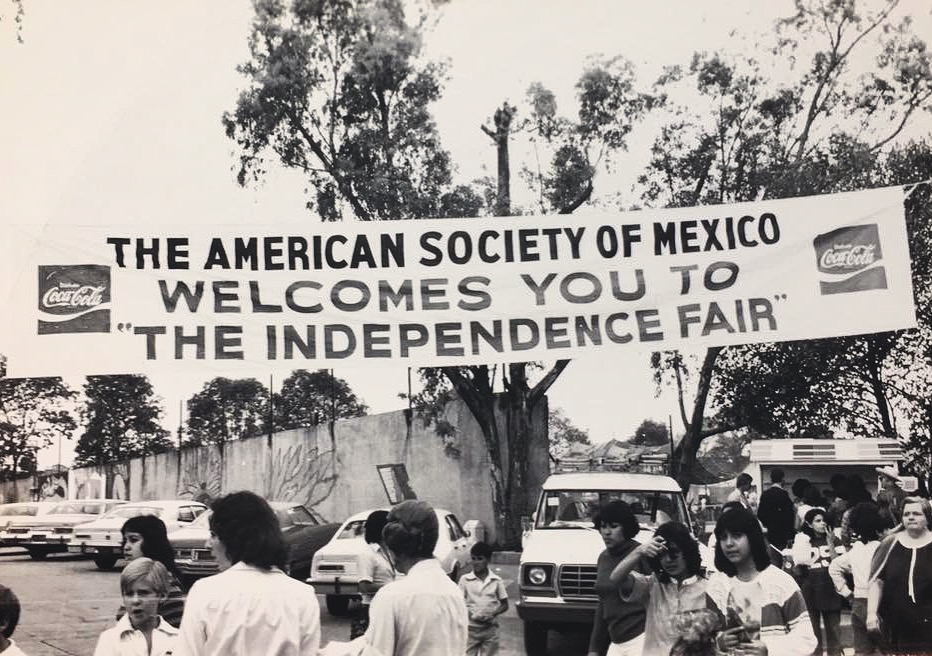
The American Society of Mexico members hold a banner outside of the American School Foundation in Mexico City welcoming friends to celebrate US Independence Day

== History ==
The American Society of Mexico was one of the first players in uniting the American Community within Mexico, helping Americans integrate within Mexico and sharing many distinctly American traditions between the American Community in Mexico and Mexicans.

The founding president was Mr. Russell Ford Moody who was born on June 13, 1902, in Michigan and received his Bachelor of Science in mechanical engineering by the University of Michigan in 1925. He was the vice president of the Canada Dry Bottling Company of Mexico, had been assistant general manager of the Compañía Hulera Euzkadi, and was alternate director of the Banco Internacional, Bank of London. He was also a board director to the American British Cowdray (ABC) Hospital, YMCA, and a standing member of the University Club, the American Club, Club de Banqueros, Masons and Tau Beta Pi. Married to Louise, he had two children: Jean Carol and Beverly.

The honorary president, George Strausser Messersmith, was born on October 3, 1883, in Fleetwood, Pennsylvania. He entered the Foreign Service and served in different countries, including Germany during World War II, where he was best known for his controversial decision to issue a visa to Albert Einstein. In Mexico Ambassador Messersmith was not only responsible for the foundation of The American Society of Mexico, but also for establishing in the same year of 1942, the well-renowned Benjamin Franklin Library in Mexico City. He was appointed by President Franklin Delano Roosevelt, the U.S. Ambassador to Mexico and arrived to Mexico in 1942, the year Mexico entered the Second World War (a few months after the United States declared war on the Axis powers).

=== Political affiliation ===
The American Society of Mexico, A.C. (AmSoc) is a non-profit, non-partisan organization established in its original charter to represent all U.S. private interests in Mexico. As a non-governmental association, the U.S. Ambassador to Mexico has always been the Honorary President, with whom the Society works closely.

== Core principles ==
- Improve the communities we live in and strengthen the bilateral relationship for the people of both nations.
- Promote and protect U.S. private interests, of individuals, companies, and American established NGO's / non-profit / civic organizations.
- Advocate on behalf of Americans in Mexico and Mexicans in the United States.
- Collaborate in the bilateral agenda set forward between both Mexico & the United States.
- Boost American events, culture and traditions in Mexico & Mexican events, culture and traditions in the U.S.

== President ==
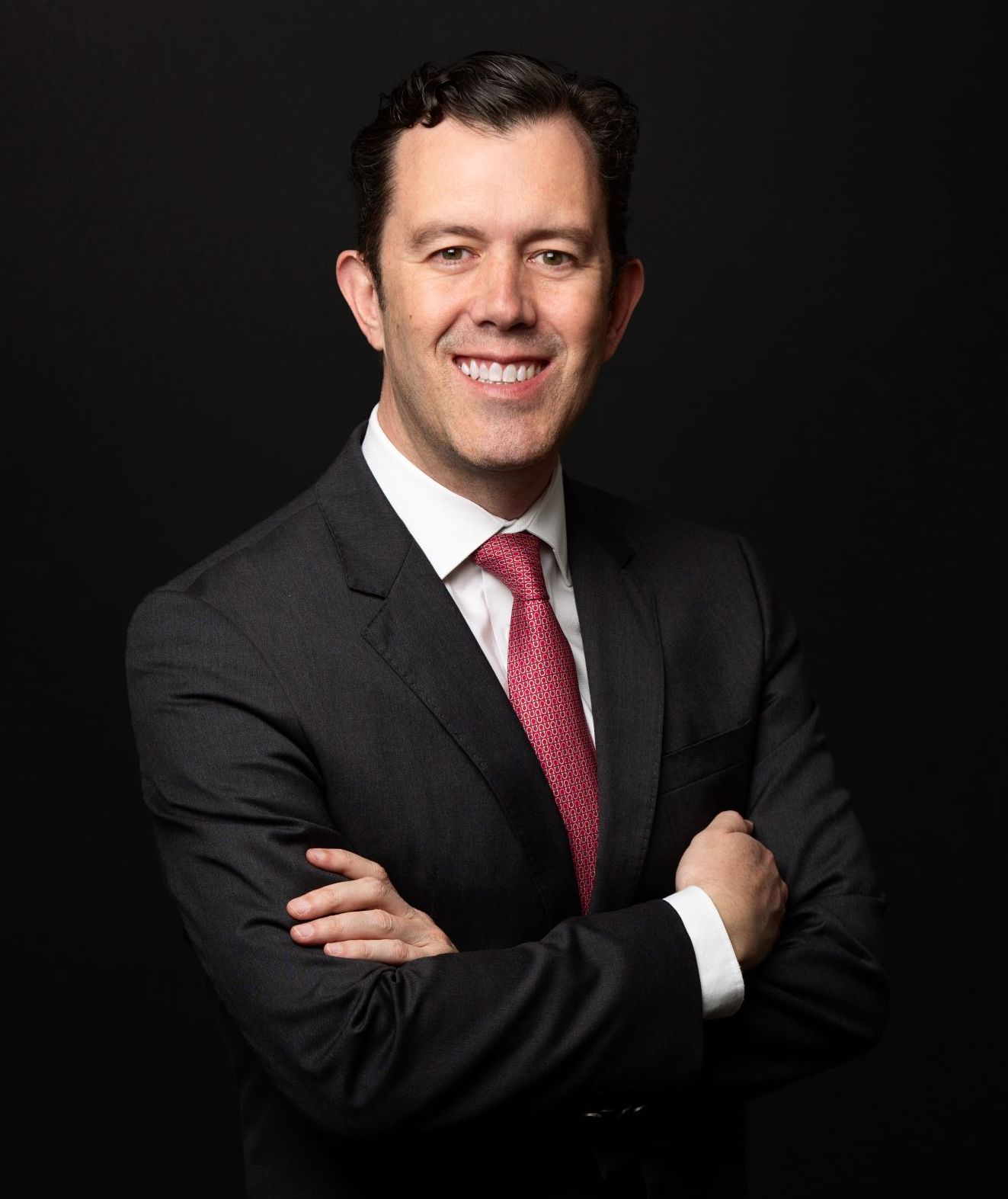
President & Chairman, The American Society Of México

Larry Rubin is the President and chairman of the Board of The American Society of Mexico.

== Honorary President ==
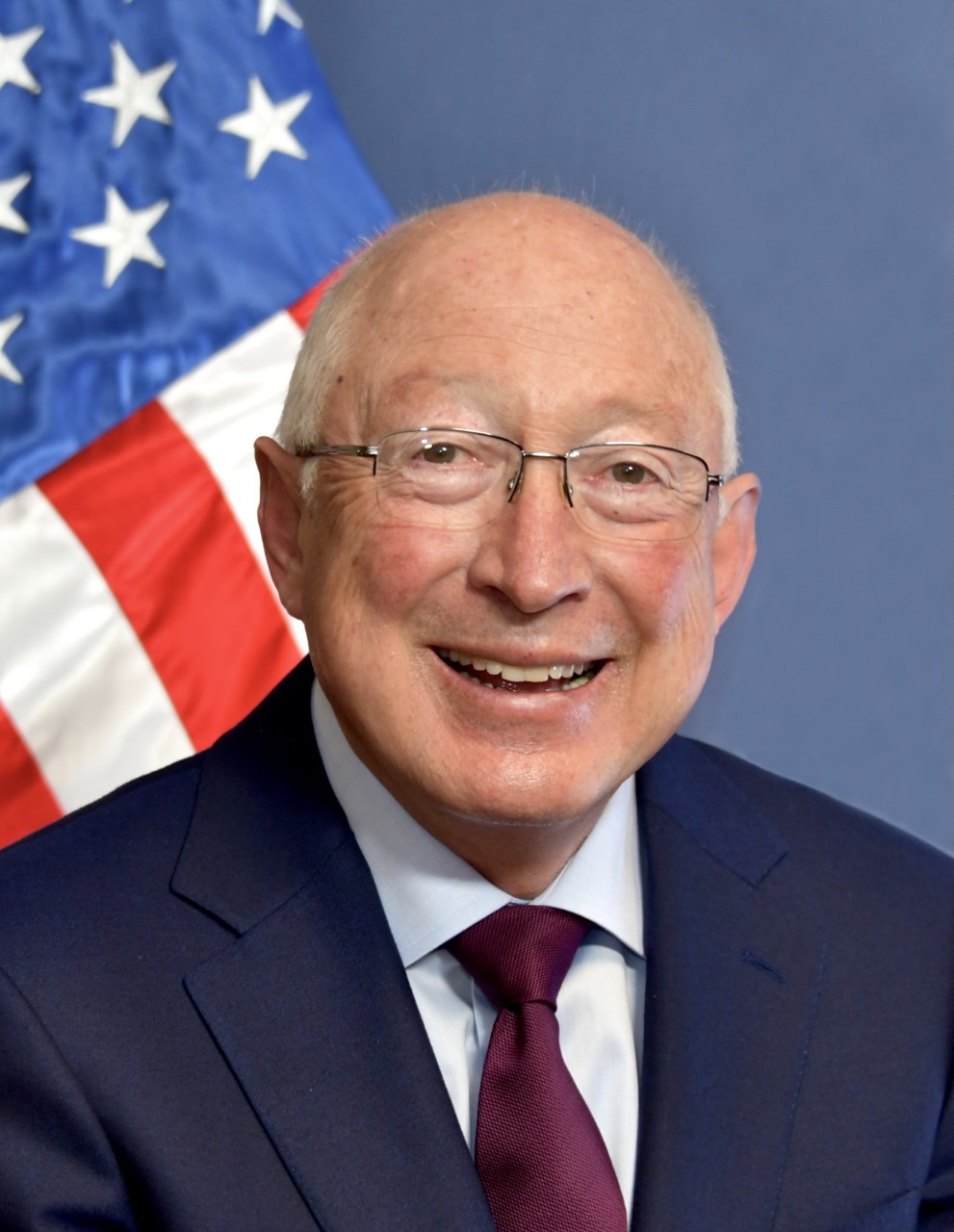
Honorary President of The American Society of Mexico

Ken Salazar, U.S. Ambassador to Mexico was sworn in as United States Ambassador to Mexico on September 2, 2021. Salazar is Honorary President of The American Society of Mexico.

== Councils ==
=== Corporate American Advisory Council ===
This group includes the leaders of 25 American companies and serves as a sounding board for American interests in Mexico, and an exchange channel for companies that face similar challenges.

=== Council of Latin America Leaders ===
This select group of leaders of the Latin American divisions of American companies was formed to advance the interests of American businesses throughout the region. In order to represent a broad spectrum of companies, each participant of the council is from a different industry.

== Committees ==
The American Society of Mexico consists of five main committees that carry out a variety of activities that serve the American community in Mexico, fostering cultural, business, philanthropic and civic ties.

=== Organizations Steering Group (OSG-AmSoc) ===
The governing body and operating arm of the Organizations Committee of The American Society of Mexico, is made up mostly of directors of organizations, as well as professional consultants and volunteers in the philanthropic field, who contribute their time to: help the organizations of our network achieve their mission, help the community through those organizations.

=== Public Affairs Task Force (PATF-AmSoc) ===
The PATF is the public affairs arm of the ASM. Its aim is to manage the public affairs that concern to government relations, charitable organizations, politics, commerce associations, business groups and communications.

=== Events ===
Events and the image committee construct an appropriate way to reach American community interests. The diversity of events reaches a large audience.

=== Memberships ===
The Membership Committee main task is to attract and make join new members to the AmSoc, following a specific strategy to maintain the members requirements in the correct level. The committee focus on developing the best strategies to get involved and to approach to the American community looking for an increase in members.

== The Association of American Clubs ==
The Association of American Clubs (AAC) is an alliance of American clubs, societies, and organizations worldwide that forms an international network providing an open forum for the exchange of institutional practices

The American Society of Mexico is a founding member of The Association of American Clubs (AAC) through a direct initiative formalized by Jürgen Abel, its founder and President of The American International Society in Hamburg, Germany during his visit to Mexico City, Mexico in the early 2000s
