= Colegio Americano de Torreón =

School in Torreón, Coahuila, Mexico

American School of Torreon
- Colegio Americano de Torreón

Location
- Paseo del Algodón No. 500; Fracc. los Viñedos; Torreón, Coahuila; Mexico
- Coordinates: 25.5726842°N 103.3806549°W

Information
- Type: Private Co-ed International
- Motto: Learning for Life
- Established: 1950
- Director: Ana Carla Tumoine
- Grades: Pre-Nursery–12th
- Enrollment: 1300
- Campus: Urban
- Colors: Blue and Red
- Mascot: Wildcats
- Nickname: CAT
- Affiliation: AdvancED – Cognia
- Programs: Advanced Placement, American High School Diploma, Mexican Diploma
- Website: cat.mx

The Colegio Americano de Torreón, is a private, nonprofit, international school in the American tradition based in Torreón. It offers coeducational college preparation for national and international students aged 3 to 18.

Founded in 1950 with 38 students and 4 teachers, as of 2023 over 1200 students attend the school. English is the main language of instruction with a bilingual program that offers courses in Spanish. The school grants two diplomas for students graduating from High School: the Mexican diploma of the Secretaría de Educación Pública (SEP) and the American diploma.

== History ==
CAT, as the school is known, was founded September 1950, in a house provided by Peñoles, a local mining company, by a group of people that wanted to provide a bicultural and bilingual education. By 1954, the school had 250 students and the school was formally established by Clinton A. Luckett and Joe Athon with the support of a board of directors consisting of locals and expatriates and appointing Dr. Paul H. Jensen as general director. That same year, the school was accredited by the Secretaría de Educación Pública and the Southern Association of Colleges and Schools.

With the assistance of a donation from the American government and with a growing student population, the school was able to move to a new campus in the 1960s, located in the Torreón Jardín neighborhood.

By 2001, the school moved to a new 30-acre (12 ha) campus located in the Los Viñedos neighborhood with a donation from Efrain López Gurza. The campus is home to over 100 classrooms, three libraries, a cafeteria, three gymnasiums, an indoor semi-Olympic-size swimming pool, multiple soccer fields, covered tennis, basketball and volleyball courts, a track and field arena, and a theater with 450 seating capacity.

== School life ==
Colegio Americano de Torreón serves students from Pre-Nursery through 12th grade in four schools: the Early Childhood Center (ages 3–5), the Elementary School (grades 1–6), the Middle School (grades 7–9), and the High School (grades 10–12). For the 2023–2024 school year, the school had 1244 students, with 39% of its teaching staff coming from an international background.

Its campus and facilities, as well as its academic and extracurricular programs, are comparable to independent schools in the United States. For the 2023–2024 school year, almost half of its student population participated in some extracurricular activity.

Extracurricular activities include sports such as track and field, swimming, soccer, taekwondo, basketball, volleyball, and tennis, as well as artistic activities such as painting, string instruments, wind instruments, theater, modern dance, and classical dance.

== See also ==
- American immigration to Mexico
