= Thomas Bell (engineer) =

Sir Thomas Bell, KBE (21 December 1865 – 9 January 1952) was a British engineer and shipbuilder. He was a director of John Brown & Co. from 1903 to 1946.
