= John F. Kennedy School, The American School of Querétaro =

- Sabinos No. 272, Jurica. Querétaro, Querétaro 76100; Mexico

Information
- Established: 1964
- Head of school: Adrian Leece
- Faculty: 161
- Grades: K1-12
- Enrollment: 1300
- Mascot: Jaguars

The John F. Kennedy School, the American School of Querétaro is a private bicultural school in Querétaro, Mexico.

== History ==
Its original location was in the Cimatario neighbourhood in Querétaro. With a single student, the growing school moved to the Hacienda la Laborcilla; in 1967 the Pre-school section was started and the Middle School section was started in 1968. There were three graduates from the high school in class of 1968, Wayne Rosenkrans, Olevia Searfoss and Holly French. Dreama Looney was in the 1969 High School graduating class. In 1970 the school was relocated to its present site in the Jurica Campestre section on land comprising nearly 15 acres (61,000 m^{2}), donated by the Torres family. In 1989 the High School Section began operations, with several companies and 50 families sponsoring the construction. In 1994 the school acquired an adjacent 1½ acre lot with the idea of constructing an auditorium that features a gymnasium.

== Accreditations and memberships ==
The John F. Kennedy School is accredited in Mexico by the Secretariat of Public Education (SEP).

Since 1983, JFK has been accredited in the United States by the Southern Association of Colleges and Schools (SACS), an association which sets forth high standards of quality education in American schools within the United States, Mexico, Central and South America, and the Caribbean.

== Governance ==
The John F. Kennedy School is established as a non-profit organization, authorized by the Ministry of the Treasury and Public Credit to accept donations and to issue receipts for tax-deductible donations. The highest authority is the General Assembly of Associates, composed of business and community members. The operation of the school is the responsibility of a General Director who is supported by an Assistant Director and four area Principals.

== See also ==
- American immigration to Mexico
