= Westhill Institute =

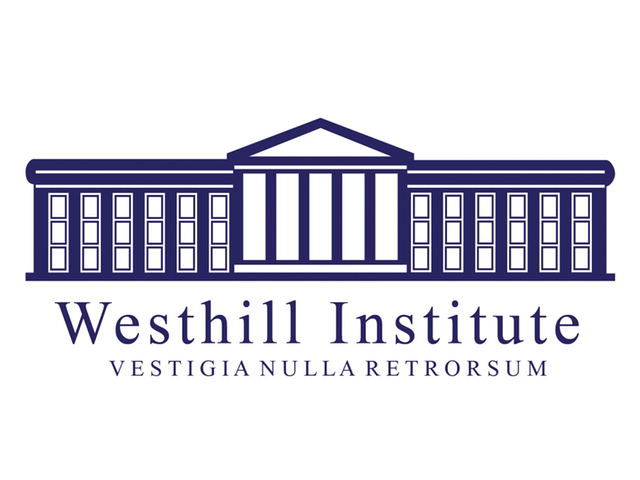
- Mexico City; Mexico

Information
- Type: Private School
- Motto: Vestigia Nulla Retrorsum
- Established: 1992
- Headmaster: Lisa Shillady
- Faculty: 170
- Enrollment: 750
- Team name: Wildcats

Westhill Institute (Spanish: Instituto Westhill) is a Pre-K-12 American international school in Mexico City. It has three campuses: two in Lomas de Chapultepec in Miguel Hidalgo, the Athos and Carpatos campuses; and the Santa Fe campus in Cuajimalpa. The Athos campus has preschool, the Carpatos campus has preschool and elementary school, and the Santa Fe campus has all levels from preschool to high school.

== History ==
The school system was founded in 1992. The Santa Fe campus opened with elementary grades in 2002, and it gained middle and high school levels in 2003.

== Student body ==
As of 2023, about 46% of students have Mexican citizenship and 48 countries and cultures are included in the remaining 54%. The school classified 10% of the student body as special needs students.

== See also ==
- American immigration to Mexico
