= American School of Tampico =

The American School of Tampico

Location
- Hidalgo #100, Tancol, C.P. 89320; Tampico, Tamaulipas, México

Information
- Founded: May 12, 1917
- Enrolment: 1020
- Website: http://www.ats.edu.mx/

The American School of Tampico is an early childhood, elementary, middle, and high school in Tampico, Mexico.

== History ==
The third oldest American school in Mexico, The American School of Tampico opened on May 12, 1917 and has been operating ever since.

The school was created by the American Foundation with the purpose of offering American children and the children of all other nationalities the same study plan found in schools in the United States.

== International and National Affiliation ==
=== Language Division ===
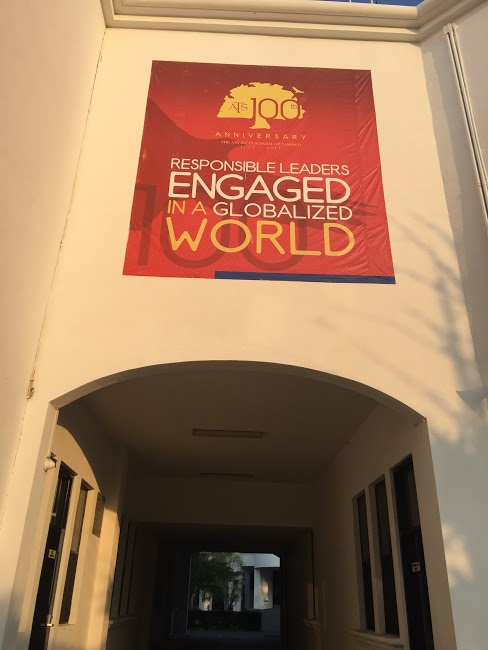
100th anniversary celebration

The Language Division Institute was created in 1995 in addition of the school to offer Tampico’s citizens an opportunity for proper education in English, German, Chinese and French. It was located in the original American School campus in Downtown Tampico from its foundation up to 2011 when it moved to the new campus in Tancol. Nowadays the Institute offers some of the English courses offered in the city, as well as TOEFL and TOEIC testing to prove the student’s achievements.

The students at ATS earn both a U.S. High School Diploma as well as a SEP Certificate.
