= Royal Commission on Population =

British Commission established in 1944

The Royal Commission on Population, was established by Royal Warrant, by the Churchill war ministry in March 1944. It was entrusted with investigating post-war demographic patterns in the United Kingdom. From 1946, the Chairman of the Royal Commission was Sir Hubert Douglas Henderson, a British economist and Liberal Party politician.

The commission's task included looking into the root causes of population patterns and examining their potential ramifications. It was also tasked with studying and recommending policies to affect future demographic patterns for the national interest.

Three specialist committees were formed to handle the scientific aspects of the problem: Statistics, Economics, and Biological/Medical. Based on the advice of these specialist committees, The Royal Commission conducted "the Family Census" in 1946.

The Royal College of Obstetricians and Gynaecologists also undertook a fertility enquiry.

The General Register Offices for England, Wales, and Scotland, as well as other government departments, assisted with a variety of specific inquiries and research activities.

In London and Paris, the commission held meetings with representatives of the Haut Comité de la Population et de la Famille.

The final report was presented to Parliament in June 1949 and published on the 20th of August 1949 in Nature. However, the report had little public impact, due to the fact that after the war an increase in the birth rate in Britain occurred.
