= William Ellis (British missionary) =

British Christian missionary and writer

William Ellis FRGS
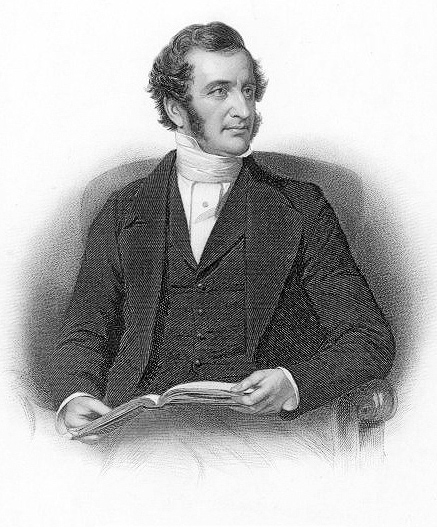
- From the London Missionary Society
- Born: 29 August 1794; London, England
- Died: 9 June 1872 (aged 77); Hoddesdon, Hertfordshire, England
- Spouse(s): Mary Mercy Moor; Sarah Stickney
- Children: Mary (eldest daughter), John Eimeo Ellis, Elizabeth (second daughter) and Ann.
- Relatives: William Hodgson Ellis (Grandson), Sir Arthur William Mickle Ellis (Great Grandson)

William Ellis (29 August 1794 – 9 June 1872) was a British missionary and writer. He travelled through the Society Islands, Hawaiian Islands, and Madagascar, and wrote several books describing his experiences.

== Early life ==
He was born in Charles Street, Long Acre, London of working-class parents on 29 August 1794. His father (from Norwich) and a short-lived older brother (25 May 1793 – 3 December 1793) were also named William. (If a child died young, parents often named another child by the same name, especially if they wanted to pass on a parent's or grandparent's name.)

Not much is known of his mother, whose maiden name was Sarah Bedborough (1772–1837). She was born in Reading, England, and her parents Daniel and Mary Bedborough had her baptised on 5 April 1772 in Hurst, Berkshire. She married William Ellis on 13 August 1792, and later moved to London it was reported she died in Wisbech on 12 February 1837 aged 64. Their other children were: Sarah Ellis (born 9 December 1797 in St. Giles, London), Mary Ellis (born 6 January 1803 in Wisbech), Ann Barnard (born Ann Ellis 1 June 1805, Wisbech) and Thomas Ellis (born 26 February 1800, Wisbech). William junior and his surviving siblings were all baptised on 4 March 1806 by Richard Wright, Protestant Dissenting Minister in the Unitarian chapel, (previously in Deadman's Lane, Wisbech).

His parents brought him, when he was four years old, and his sister Sarah to Wisbech, Isle of Ely, Cambridgeshire. Young William developed a love of plants in his youth and became a gardener. He left school by the age of twelve, when he worked first in Wisbech and then Thorney in the Isle of Ely, later moving to Outwell to work for Rev. Hardwicke, then at a nursery north of London, and eventually for a wealthy family in Stoke Newington. Being of a religious nature, he applied to train as a Christian missionary for the London Missionary Society and was accepted to the school. He began writing at the age of 12, on being urged by a Unitarian minister named Richard Wright at elementary school, who discerned his talent at an early age. Wright was for several years employed as a missionary by the London Unitarian Fund Society to spread their doctrine and as a consequence gave up his post in Wisbech—for a while the congregation was without a minister. During a year's training Ellis acquired some knowledge of theology and of various practical arts, such as printing and bookbinding.

== Mission to Polynesia ==
After attending Homerton College, then in Hampstead, Ellis was ordained in 1815. He married Mary Mercy Moor (born 16 October 1793) on 9 November 1815. she was the daughter of Alexander Moor (from Perth, died c1794) and Mary Mercy (died 1799).

He was soon posted to the South Sea Islands with his wife, leaving England on 23 January 1816. They arrived at Eimeo, one of the Windward Islands, via Sydney, and learned the language there. His daughter Mary (1817–1837) was born. During their stay, several chiefs of nearby Pacific islands who had assisted Pomare in regaining sovereignty of Tahiti, visited Eimeo and welcomed the LMS missionaries (including John Orsmond and John Williams and their wives) to their own islands. All three missionary families went to Huahine, arriving in June 1818, drawing crowds from neighbouring islands, including King Tamatoa of Raiatea. They had four children, Mary (1817–1837), John Eimeo Ellis (born 1818), Elizabeth (1820–1858) and Ann Ellis (1821–1862).

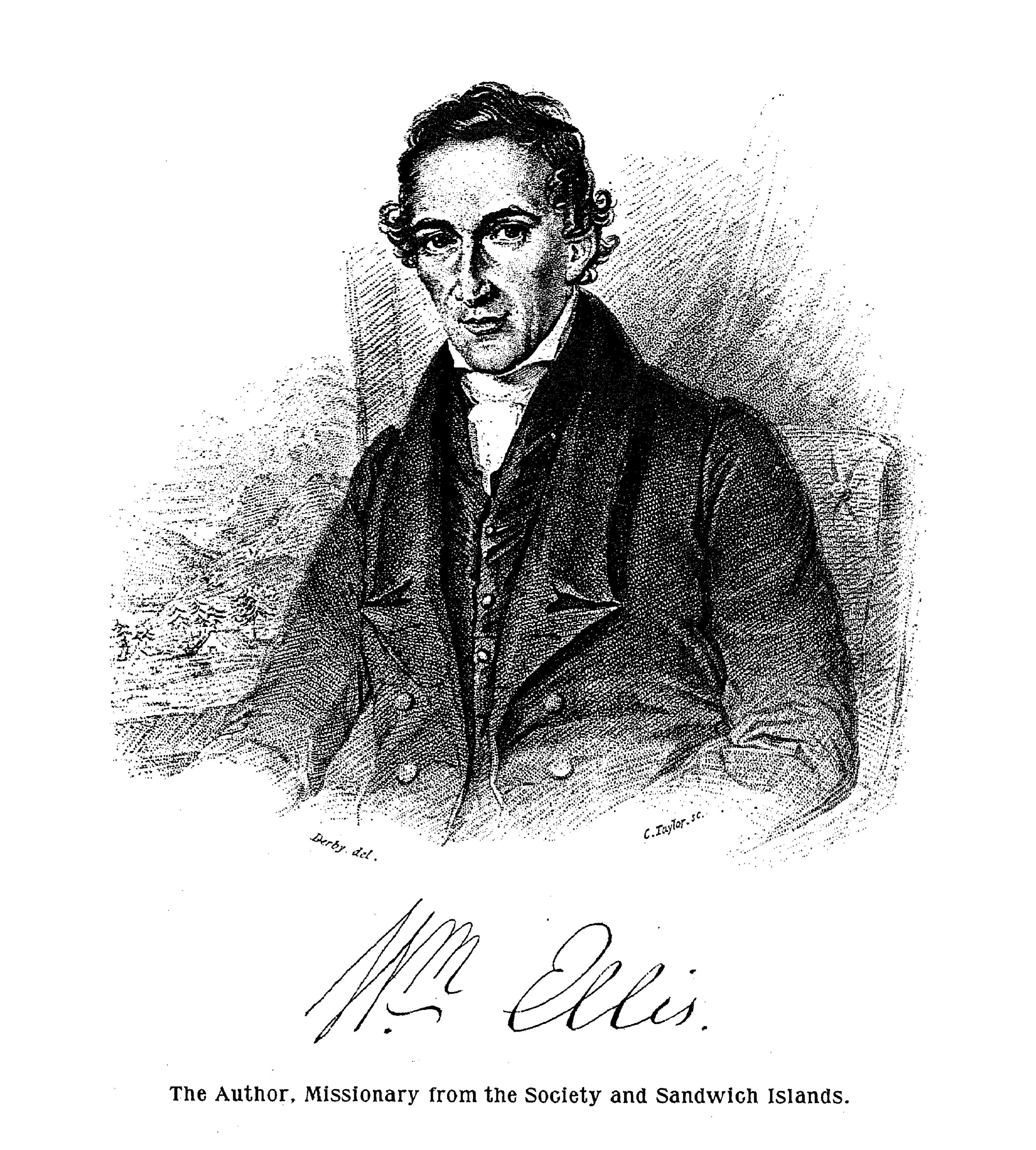

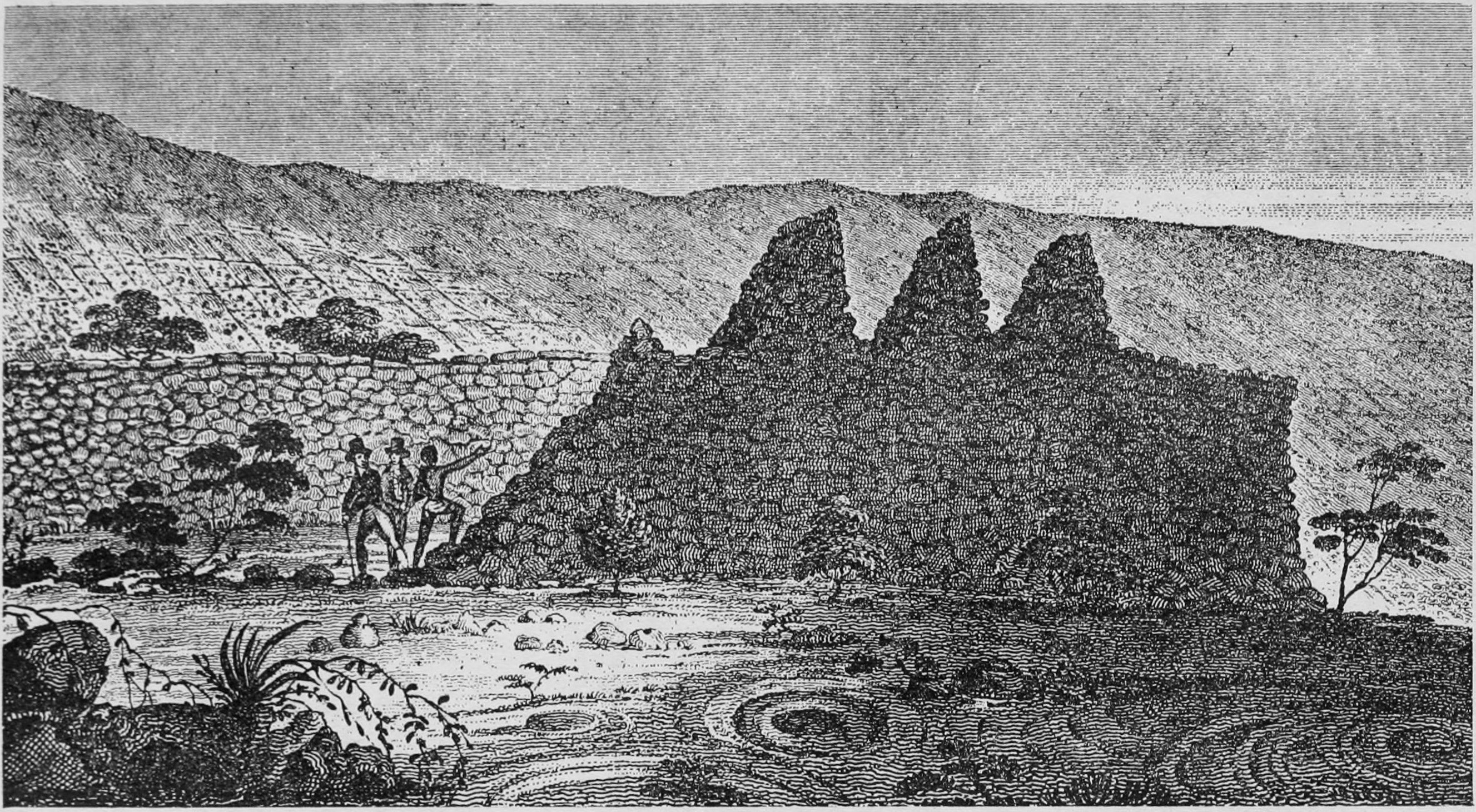
Illustration of ruins south of Kailua-Kona from his journal

Ellis and a small group travelled from Tahiti on the schooner Mermaid to the Hawaiian Islands, known then as the Sandwich Islands. On the same voyage, another small schooner called Prince Regent, outfitted with six cannons, was presented to King Kamehameha II. The party arrived in Honolulu on 16 April 1822. Although the plan had been to also visit the Marquesas Islands, it returned to Tahiti on 27 August 1822.

Ellis was invited to stay and he arranged for his family to come to Hawaii, where they arrived on the Active on 4 February 1823. In June 1823 Ellis joined the American Missionaries Asa Thurston, Artemas Bishop, and Joseph Goodrich on a tour of the island of Hawaii, to investigate suitable sites for mission stations. On the way he stopped at Maui and met and baptized Queen Keōpūolani. Their first stop was Kailua-Kona, where they met the Governor of the island, Kuakini, who was known as John Adams.

Ellis and his party visited Kealakekua Bay, and toured the historic sites nearby, such as the Puʻuhonua o Hōnaunau. They travelled south past the Mauna Loa volcano. They were some of the first Europeans to visit the caldera of the Kīlauea volcano, which was active at the time. On the eastern side they visited Hilo and Waipiʻo Valley, and some of the party continued up snow-covered Mauna Kea.

Some of the important missions set up as a result of this trip include Mokuaikaua Church, Imiola Church, Kealakekua Church, and the Haili Church. Returning to Honolulu, Ellis set about learning the Hawaiian language. He transcribed the language into a Roman alphabet and helped set up a printing press.

== In England ==
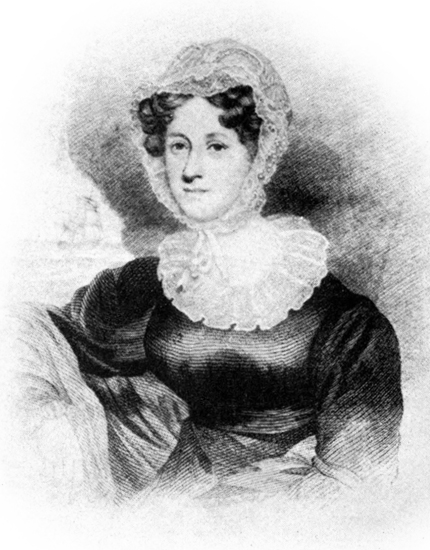
Mary Ellis, 1836.

In August 1824 they had to return to England, as Mrs Ellis was in poor health, and so took a ship via America. Back in London, Ellis published his narrative of travels in Hawaii. He was selected as Assistant Foreign Secretary of the London Missionary Society in 1830 and its Chief Foreign Secretary in 1832, holding the office for seven years. His wife Mary, mother of four children, died on 11 January 1835. In 1836, Crocker & Brewster published a biography by her husband, Memoir of Mrs. Mary Mercy Ellis.

Ellis remarried two years later to Sarah Stickney (1799–1872) on 23 May, the couple were unable to have a wedding trip as William's eldest daughter was ill, she died in June and was buried in Bunhill Fields burial-ground, next to her mother. She had been brought up a Quaker but latterly chosen to become an Independent or Congregationalist, as did many of those involved in the London Missionary Society, albeit a non-denominational one. She shared her husband's love of books and of writing. He had started to become a successful writer about the topography, history, botany, and ethnography of Polynesia since returning from the South Seas. Sarah Ellis gained her own success, primarily with books on women's role in society.

Ellis's most important work was Polynesian Researches. This established him as a talented ethnographic and geographical writer, and was reviewed in the Quarterly Review by Robert Southey: "A more interesting book we have never perused." This and similar acclaim for Ellis's writing from others influenced investors to regard the missionaries more favourably, particularly the LMS missionaries. They had previously been portrayed as naively raising the expectations, educational level, liberty and status of slaves and native peoples, rather than taking a traditionally hard-headed approach to trade and commerce.

Ellis was asked by the directors of the LMS to write up his studies of Madagascar, which were published in 1838 as the two-volume History of Madagascar. In 1844 the first volume of his History of the London Missionary Society was also published. Due to ill health, Ellis resigned from the LMS, wanting also to spend more time with his wife Sarah in their house in the country village of Hoddesdon in Hertfordshire, twenty miles north of London, which she had set us Rawdon House in 1840. In 1847, he was offered a post in Hoddesdon as pastor of its Congregational church.

== Mission to Madagascar ==
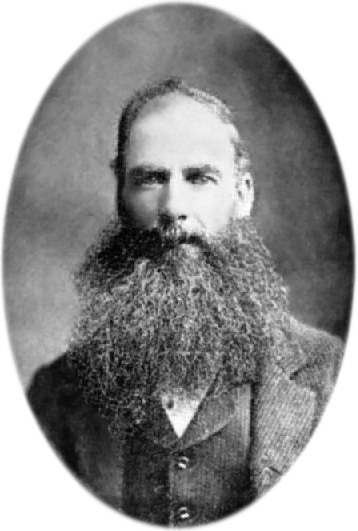
William Ellis in later life.

After five years, Ellis recovered his health and accepted an LMS offer to travel to Madagascar as their official emissary. Before leaving Ellis sought the help of Roger Fenton to learn photography and obtain the requisite equipment and chemicals. Arriving in 1853, he was rebuffed by officials in attempting to establish a mission and refused permission to go to the capital. Establishing a temporary base in Mauritius, he again sought entry to Madagascar, but was refused. He made a third visit in 1856, but Queen Ranavalona I permitted him only a one-month stay. To mark these events he wrote Three Visits to Madagascar (1858).

Ellis returned to Wisbech in April, 1860, delivering an address on Madagascar. A collection was taken and later used to provide a gift of a Blackie's Imperial Atlas and a clock to Radama II, King of Madagascar. A photographic portrait of the king in military dress, with his crown on a table, taken by Ellis was displayed at the Wisbech Working Men's Institute.

On his fourth attempt in 1862, Ellis was finally permitted entry in May. French influence in the area was said to have been a factor hitherto, as the French did not want other Europeans gaining a toehold on the island. Ellis stayed until 1865, gradually laying the foundations for Christianity. He returned to a great welcome in England in 1865 and was asked to lecture widely about his travels and his religious influence in the islands.

Ellis returned to Wisbech in 1867 to give a further talk on Madagascar in the Lecture Room at Wisbech Public Hall. After Ellis's death a fellow member of Wisbech Working Men's Institute Samuel Smith printed some of his photographs. Local printer and photographer Arthur Balding must have taken this opportunity to photograph Ellis, as the following month he published for sale 'carte de visite size', coloured or plain. It was claimed to be the only photograph of the sitter. A portrait in oils of Ellis was presented to the Working Men's Institute by Jonathan Peckover for display, it is now (2021) in Wisbech & Fenland Museum. Specimens of costumes and cloth brought back by Ellis were presented to the museum. Four years later, in 1869, Queen Ranavalona II and the royal court of Madagascar converted to Christianity.

Ellis's books about his experiences and the history and geography of the island were Madagascar Revisited (1867) and Martyr Church of Madagascar (1870).

== Death ==
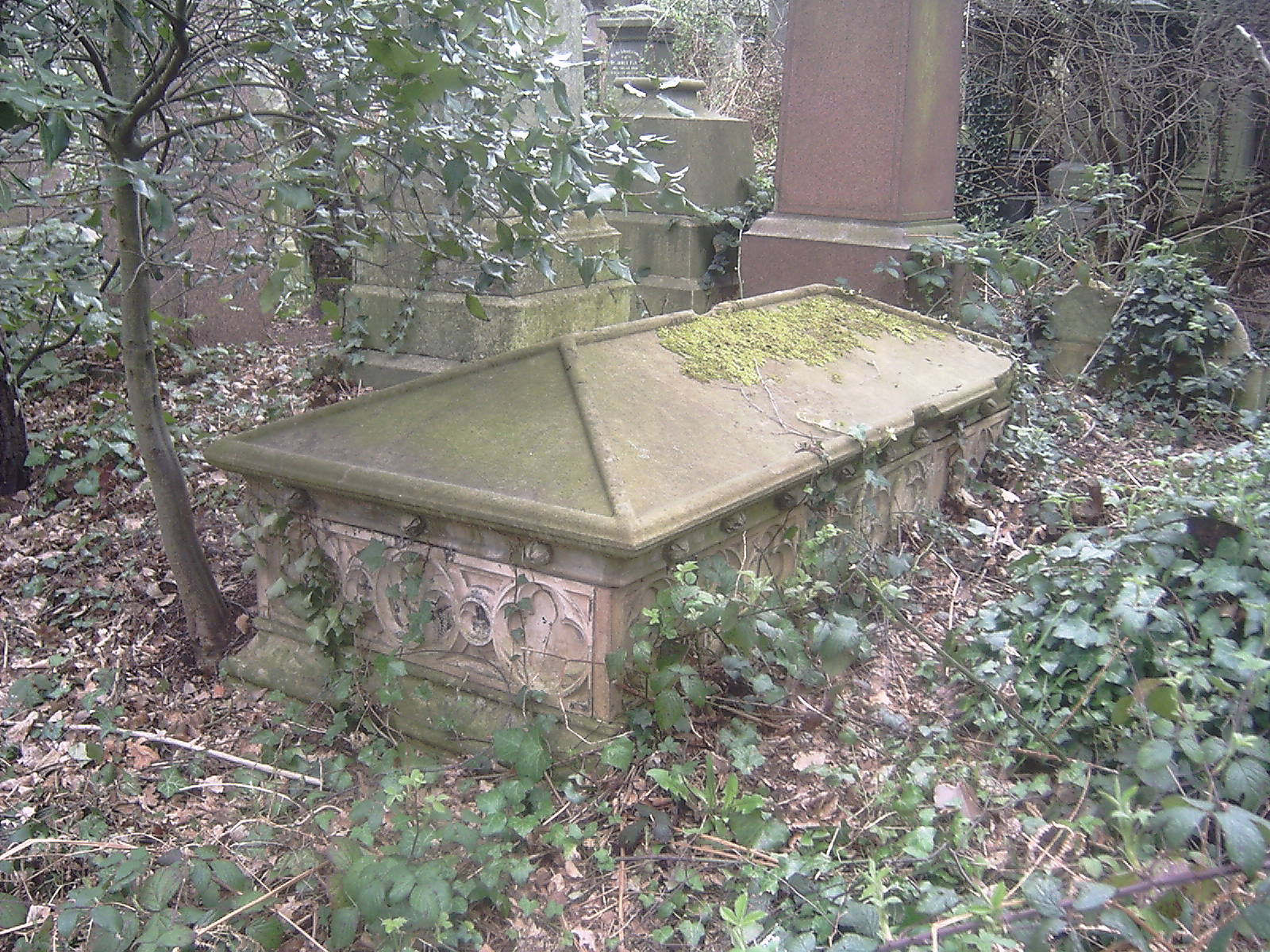
William Ellis' tomb at the Abney Park Cemetery

Ellis caught cold while on a train journey and died on 9 June 1872. Sarah Ellis died seven days later on 16 June. They had been married for 35 years.

Ellis is buried in a venerated spot in the non-denominational Abney Park Cemetery in London, near where Isaac Watts once lived. His intricately carved hip tomb is aligned with its chapel. His second wife preferred to be buried near their country home. A biography written by his son John Ellis and Henry Allon was published soon after his death.

== Legacy ==
Ellis donated to the Wisbech & Fenland Museum specimens he had collected, including two idols, a flint adze, part of a gown of the Queen of the Sandwich Islands and other fabrics. A number of original collodion glass negatives from the William Ellis collection of the Wisbech & Fenland Museum were used in the exhibitions. William Ellis: Photography in Madagascar 1853-1865 was exhibited at the Fine Art Society, London, 3–30 July 1995 followed by Queen's Place, Antananarivo, Madagascar from September, 1995. Other images are included in the Getty collection.

== Works ==
- William Ellis (1823). A Journal of a Tour around Hawaii, the Largest of the Sandwich Islands. Crocker and Brewster, New York, republished 2004, Mutual Publishing, Honolulu. ISBN 1-56647-605-4.
- William Ellis (1829). Polynesian Researches, During a Residence of Nearly Six Years in the South Sea Islands, Volume 1. Fisher, Son & Jackson. republished 1969, Charles E. Tuttle Company, Rutland
- William Ellis (1829). Polynesian researches, during a residence of nearly six years in the South Sea Islands, Volume 2. Fisher, Son & Jackson.
- William Ellis (1832). Polynesian researches during a residence of nearly eight years in the Society and Sandwich Islands Volume 3 (Second ed.). Fisher, Son & Jackson.
- William Ellis, ed. (1832). Rev C S Stewart's Visit to the South Seas during the years 1829-30. Fisher, Son & Jackson.
- William Ellis, ed. (1836). The Christian Keepsake and Missionary Annual. Fisher, Son & Co.
- William Ellis (1836). Memoir of Mrs. Mary Mercy Ellis (American ed.). Crocker & Brewster.
- William Ellis (1859). Three visits to Madagascar during the years 1853-1854-1856. Harper.
- William Ellis (1866). The American mission in the Sandwich islands: a vindication and an appeal, in relation to the proceedings of the Reformed Catholic Mission at Honolulu. HM Whitney.
- William Ellis (1867). Madagascar revisited, describing the events of a new reign and the revolution which followed. John Murray. ISBN 0-548-22734-9.
- William Ellis (1870). The martyr church: a narrative of the introduction, progress, and triumph of Christianity in Madagascar. J. Snow. ISBN 0-8370-0407-1.

== See also ==
- Daniel Tyerman
- George Bennet
