= John Devonshire Ellis =

British steelmaker

John Devonshire Ellis (20 April 1824 – 11 November 1906) was a steelmaker from Sheffield, England. He developed armour-plating for warships, and worked on the Bessemer process of steelmaking.

== Early life ==
Ellis was born in Handsworth on 20 April 1824, son of Charles Ellis, a Birmingham brass manufacturer, and was educated at King Edward VI School, Birmingham. He obtained a practical knowledge of the manufacture and working of brass in his father's works, and in 1848 became a partner in the firm.

On 5 December 1848 he married Elizabeth Parsons Bourne of Childs Ercall, Shropshire.

== Armour-plate for warships ==
In 1854 he purchased with John Brown and William Bragge the Atlas engineering works in Sheffield, then a modest establishment covering about three acres. Shortly after the partners took over the works, the adoption of armour for warships in France (1858) led the company to produce iron plates by a new and cheaper process of rolling welding them. Four-inch plates made by this process were fitted to HMS Warrior and HMS Black Prince, the earliest ironclads of the British Royal Navy.

For several years Ellis was occupied in devising appliances for the manufacture of thicker plates to protect ships against guns and projectiles. Steel was tried, but was not found to have the necessary toughness under the impact of shot. After many experiment Ellis perfected a process for uniting a hard steel face with a wrought-iron backing. Such compound armour was used until about 1893, the Royal Sovereign-class battleships being protected with an 18-inch belt of this on the water-line. Meanwhile, as early as 1871, Ellis had turned his attention to the process of cementation, and in that year he took out a patent relating to it; but it was not until the chilling process devised by Captain T. J. Tresidder (in which the heated surface of a plate was chilled by means of water under pressure) was applied in conjunction with cementation, that satisfactory results were obtained. The first Ellis-Tresidder chilled compound plate was tried with success at Shoeburyness in 1891.

== Bessemer process and other developments ==
Ellis was largely instrumental in promoting the success of the Bessemer process. Sir Henry Bessemer established works close to the Atlas works, and Ellis, adopting at an early stage the new process, then established at the Atlas works the first plant in England outside the inventor's own works.

In conjunction with William Eaves he introduced the Ellis-Eaves system of induced draught, and he devised a mill for rolling the ribbed boiler-flues of the Purves and other types, and also in connection with the manufacture of Serve tubes.

The Atlas works soon acquired a worldwide reputation for mechanical engineering of all kinds. The concern was formed into a limited liability company in 1864. The capital rose to nearly three millions sterling; about 10,000 men were employed at Ellis's death, and the output exceeded 100,000 tons of steel per annum. Ellis was managing director from 1864 until 1905, when he became chairman of the company. Brown retired in 1870 and Bragge died in 1884, when Ellis acquired sole charge. In 1899 the Clydebank Shipbuilding and Engineering Works, employing 8000 men, were taken over by the concern.

== Awards and later life ==
In 1867 Ellis was decorated with the Cross of the Order of Vasa in recognition of his aid in certain fortifications in Sweden. From the Iron and Steel Institute, of which he was a member from 1875, a member of council in 1888, and a vice-president in 1901, he received the Bessemer Gold Medal in 1889, when Sir Henry Bessemer acknowledged Ellis's services in establishing the process. He was elected a member of the Institution of Civil Engineers on 8 January 1884. He took little part in the public affairs of Sheffield, but was a magistrate for the West Riding, and was for ten years chairman of the South Yorkshire Coalowners' Association.

He died at his residence in Worksop on 11 November 1906 and was buried at Carlton in Lindrick.

His son William Henry Ellis was also a steelmaker in Sheffield.
