= Colegio Americano de Puebla =

- Puebla American School

Location
- 9 Poniente Street No. 2709; Colonia La Paz; Puebla, Puebla 72160; Mexico; 19.0508°N 98.2214°W

Information
- School type: Private
- Motto: Where You Belong
- Founded: 1942
- Founder: Anne Jenkins of Buntzler
- Grades: K-12
- Classes: SEP / BUAP / IB / AP
- Average class size: 25
- Language: English, Spanish
- Campus type: Urban
- Houses: Lions, Sharks, Wolves, Eagles
- Colours: Red, blue and white
- Sports: Soccer, basketball, volleyball, track and field, flag football
- Mascot: Husky
- CENEVAL Exam II average: 1211
- Affiliation: ASOMEX, International Baccalaureate, Cognia, IBAMEX, IAIE, The Tree-Association/ The Association of American Schools and Mary Street Jenkins Foundation
- Website: www.cap.edu.mx/index_e.htm

The Puebla American School (Spanish: Colegio Americano de Puebla) is a private school serving students in Bilingual Stimulation, pre-kinder, kindergarten through grade 12 in Puebla, Mexico. The Puebla American School has two campuses: one from kindergarten through 9th grade and one from 10th through 12th grade.

The school offers the International Baccalaureate Diploma and the local BUAP (Benemérita Universidad Autónoma de Puebla) for the high school. For primary and junior high school students, the IB Primary Years and Middle Years Programme are offered.

The school was the first in Puebla to organize the Model United Nations, PASMUN.

== Curriculum ==
In 1995, the school associated with the International Baccalaureate Organization. By 2006, the school was authorized to teach the three IBO programs: the IB Primary Years Programme, Middle Years Programme, and Diploma Programme. The American School of Puebla was the first school in the city of Puebla and only the fifth in the country to be authorized to teach all three IB programs.

== Academic Levels ==
The school offers the following:

Bilingual stimulation: For children from 3 months old. Divided into different groups according to age.

Prekínder: For children from 18 months old. Divided into Pre-k 1 and Pre-k 2 according to age.

Preschool: For children from 3 years old. Divided into Kinder 1, Kinder 2, and Kinder 3.

Primary School: For children between 6 and 12 years old. From 1st to 6th grade.

Junior High School: For children between 12 and 15 years old. From 7th to 9th grade.

High School: For youths between 15 and 18 years old. From 10th to 12th grade.

== Extended Learning ==
The Puebla American School offers extracurricular activities such as soccer, basketball, volleyball, flag football, track & field, hip hop, theater, regional dance, drawing & painting, violin, piano, guitar, and ukulele.

== Social Emotional Well-being ==
In 2023, they inaugurated their Well-being Center, a facility specializing in human development aimed at fostering emotional well-being. For the 2026–2027 academic year, the school formalized a psycho-pedagogical team of more than 35 specialists in psychology, pedagogy, and special education, strategically distributed across the various academic sections.
