= American School Foundation =

The American School Foundation, A.C.
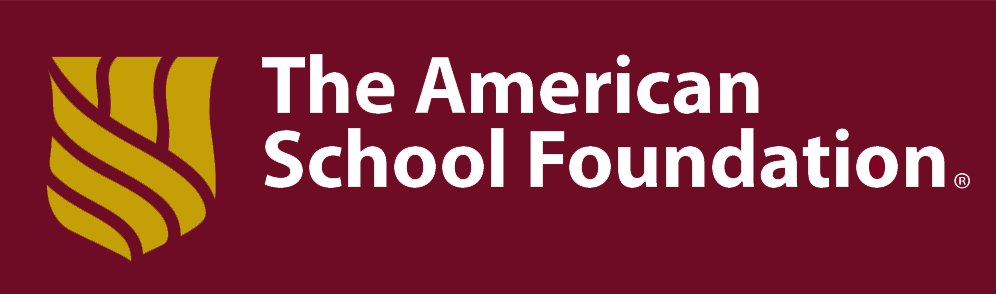

Location
- Mexico City; Mexico
- Coordinates: 19°24′0.8″N 99°12′22.9″W

Information
- Type: International College Preparatory School
- Motto: Educating Global Citizens for a Changing World
- Established: 1888
- CEEB code: 870360
- Director: Kolia O'Connor
- Faculty: 250
- Grades: K-12
- Enrollment: 2,500
- Campus: Urban, 17 acres (69,000 m^{2})
- Colors: Maroon, gold & white
- Mascot: Bears
- Programs: International Baccalaureate Program, Advanced Placement, American High School Diploma, Mexican Diploma
- Website: www.asf.edu.mx

The American School Foundation, A.C, ("Colegio Americano" in Spanish) is an independent international school in the American tradition based in Mexico City. It offers coeducational college-preparatory school for international students aged 3 to 18. Founded in 1888, it is the oldest operating accredited American School outside the United States, and is widely considered to be amongst the first international schools in the World.

As of 2022, over 2,500 students from more than 40 countries attend the school. English is the language of instruction with the exception of a bilingual program in the lower school and courses in Spanish at the secondary level. The social language of the school is mainly Spanish. The school has about 280 teaching staff.

The school grants up to five diplomas for students graduating from its Upper School: the Mexican diploma of the Secretaría de Educación Pública (SEP), the American diploma, the International Baccalaureate (IB), and the AP International and Capstone diplomas.

== History ==
The American School Foundation, A.C, was founded on August 6, 1888, in the private home of oilman John Davis, near what is now Bucareli and Reforma. In 1894, with a growing student body, the school became the "Mexico Grammar School," and moved to a rented building on Calle Colón. In 1902, H.H. Cronyn and Charles E. Cummings, a key figure in the consolidation of The American School, are the superintendent and board president, respectively, by this time, and are credited with helping the school move forward after its wartime troubles. Charles E. Cummings was board president for most of the first 16 years of the 20th century. Then, housed in a larger building on Industria Street in Colonia San Rafael, the school added a high school and accordingly changed its name to the Mexico City Grammar and High School. At this time, the total number of students was 455.

Between 1905 and 1908, The American School Association was formed by a number of Mexico City businessmen, with Paul Hudson as the first president and Schuyler Herron as the superintendent until 1908. The breakout of the Mexican Revolution in 1910 curtailed foreign investment and decreasing school enrollment. The school remained open throughout most of the conflict, although it did briefly close its doors during the events of the Decena Trágica, ten days of violence in Mexico City following the assassination of President Francisco I. Madero and Vice-president José María Pino Suárez, a rare occurrence school history. In 1914, Walter Thurston, later to become the U.S. Ambassador to Mexico, graduated from The American School.

In 1914, after the United States occupation of Veracruz, so few Americans were left in Mexico City that the high school was closed after the 1915 class graduated, restarting with a freshman class in 1917. One of the six graduates of the 1915 class was Kingsley J. Niven, a school clerk as well as a student who took over as de facto school administrator and ended up signing his own diploma.

In 1921, The American School Association was dissolved and replaced by a non-profit educational institution. It is at this time that the School got its current name "The American School Foundation" with its duration defined as "in perpetuity." Its purpose was to establish a teaching institution that utilized the most modern and effective teaching methods used in the United States. Founding members include S. Bolling Wright, Lewis Lamm, Edward Orring, Harry Wright and Charles Cummings.

In 1946, the school acquired the 17-acre (69,000 m^{2}) Bondojito campus, across the street from ABC Hospital, where it remains to this day. Over the years, the campus has grown to include four libraries, science labs in each school, and over 600 computers in classrooms, three indoor gymnasiums, an indoor heated pool, a football stadium, lighted tennis courts, track, and various athletic fields.

During 1979, a group of American School students form part of the welcoming committee for the February visit to Mexico City of U.S. President Jimmy Carter. Again in 2013, ASF students were invited to hear President Obama's Speech to Mexican Students at the Anthropology Museum in Mexico City.

== Today ==
The American School Foundation, A.C., located in Mexico City, serves students from Kindergarten through 12th grade in four schools: the Early Childhood Center (ages 3–7), the Lower School (grades 1–5), the Middle School (grades 6–8), and the Upper School (grades 9–12). The American School Foundation has two primary languages of instruction, English and Spanish.

By nationalities, the student body of 2,500 is approximately 58% Mexican, 21% from the United States with Mexican connections, and 21% from different nationalities. Its 17-acre (69,000 m^{2}) campus and facilities, as well as its academic and extracurricular programs, are comparable to independent schools in the United States.

Sports offered include track & field, swimming, soccer to American football.

== Academics ==
The American School Foundation, A.C. is accredited by the Southern Association of Schools and Colleges. Studies are recognized by the Mexican Secretary of Public Education and high school level studies can be validated by UNAM, useful for students who wish to study in Mexico or another Spanish-speaking country. The American School Foundation, A.C. is an International Baccalaureate World School offering the Primary Years (PYP), Middle Years (MYP) and Diploma Programs. ASF also offers Advanced Placement courses.

Most students graduate proficient in at least two languages, English and Spanish. Nearly 99% of Upper School graduates attend college.

== See also ==
- American immigration to Mexico
