= American School Foundation of Guadalajara =

The American School Foundation of Guadalajara (ASFG)

Location
- Guadalajara, Jalisco; Mexico
- Coordinates: 20°41′44.5″N 103°22′32.4″W

Information
- Type: Private dual immersion English/Spanish bilingual school
- Motto: Let's Go Warriors!
- Established: 1908
- Principal: David McGrath
- Faculty: 157
- Grades: Pre-school to 12
- Enrollment: 1494
- Campus size: 6.5 acres
- Website: asfg.edu.mx

The American School Foundation of Guadalajara is a bilingual private school offering academic programs in dual languages English and Spanish from primary to high school. As the only U.S. State Department accredited school in Guadalajara, graduates receive both a Mexican and a U.S. Diploma. The Mexican Diploma is certified by the Universidad Nacional Autonóma de Mexico (UNAM) and the Secretaría de Educación Jalisco (SEJ) as the State’s Federal Institution in charge of Education.

== History ==
The American School Foundation of Guadalajara was founded by Delia Walsh in 1908. The purpose of the small school was to educate the children of U.S. officials and consulate workers as well as U.S. Railroad workers in Guadalajara during the construction of the Southern Pacific Railroad. The American School Foundation of Guadalajara, A.C., an “Asociación Civil” (non-profit organization), was formed and legally constituted on April 17, 1956. In 1959, the school was moved to its current campus, Colomos 2100 in the Colonia Italia Providencia area. In 2021, a new high school building was completed.

== School profile ==
The average yearly enrollment at ASFG is 1500 students. The student body is predominantly Mexican, representing 75% of the student population. 13% are U.S. students with Mexican ties, and 12% are from Asian, Latin American and European countries. More than 95% of graduates go on to attend college or university. The average faculty staff is 180 members and comes from both local and international backgrounds. It is administered by a Board of Trustees and a Board of Directors. The Board of Trustees is considered the maximum authority of the Association under the law, and the Board of Directors is in charge of monitoring the overall operations of the school.

== Accreditations and affiliations ==
ASFG has accreditations and affiliations from the following educational organisations and associations:

- ASFG is a U.S. State Department, Office of Overseas Schools, sponsored educational institution
- Association of American Schools in Mexico (ASOMEX)
- Association of Schools in Mexico, the Caribbean, Central America and Colombia (Tri Association)
- AdvancED
- Association for the Advancement of International Education (AAIE)
- National Association of Independent Schools (NAIS)
- Association of Supervision and Curriculum Development (ASCD)
- National Association of Secondary School Principals (NASSP)
- National Staff Development Council (NSDC / Learning Forward)
- College Board
- North American Reggio Emilia Alliance (NAREA)
- National Science Teacher Association (NSTA)
- National Council of Teachers of Mathematics (NCTM)
- International Reading Association (IRA)
- National Council of Teachers of English (NCTE)
- International Society for Technology in Education (ISTE)
