= William Hodgson Ellis =

Engineer and professor (1845–1920)

Dean of the University of Toronto Faculty of Applied Science and Engineering
- In office 1914–1919
- Preceded by: John Galbraith
- Succeeded by: Charles Hamilton Mitchell

Personal details
- Born: 23 November 1845 Derbyshire, England, UK
- Died: 23 August 1920 (aged 74) Lake Joseph, Muskoka Lakes, Ontario, Canada
- Spouse: Ellen Maude Mickle
- Children: Arthur William Mickle Ellis, Ethel May Ellis Crooks
- Relatives: William Ellis (British missionary) (Grandfather)
- Education: B.A., 1867; M.A., 1868; M.B., 1870
- Alma mater: University of Toronto
- Scientific career
- Known for: President of the Royal Canadian Institute; Chairman of the Canadian Section of the Society of Chemical Industry
- Fields: Applied Chemistry

William Hodgson Ellis (1845–1920) was a Professor of Applied Chemistry from 1878, and Dean of the Faculty of Applied Science and Engineering at the University of Toronto from 1914, until his retirement in 1919.

== Early life ==
William Hodgson Ellis was born on 23 November 1845 in Holme Hall, Bakewell, Derbyshire, England. He was the son of the only daughter of Mr. Joseph Hodgson of Holme Hall and her husband, the resident physician, John Eimeo Ellis. Ellis emigrated with his family to the State of Illinois in 1857 and then to Toronto in 1859.

Ellis's paternal grandfather was William Ellis (1794–1872), the English missionary and author.

== Education ==
Ellis entered University College at the University of Toronto in 1863, receiving his B.A. in 1867 with the Gold Medal in Natural Science. He obtained his M.A. in 1868 and his M.B. (Bachelor of Medicine) in 1870. Following his education in Toronto, he went to London, England and obtained a position on the house staff of St. Thomas' Hospital, securing his L.R.C.P. in the autumn of 1871, when he returned to Canada.

== University of Toronto ==
He settled down to practice his profession, but was immediately offered the position of lecturer in chemistry in Trinity College, and shortly afterwards he undertook similar duties in the newly-founded School of Technology. This latter institution became in 1877 The Ontario School of Practical Science in which he was Assistant Professor of Chemistry. In 1887 he became Professor of Applied Chemistry, a position which he held till his retirement.

In 1907, when the School of Practical Science became the Faculty of Applied Science and Engineering of the University of Toronto, he was made head of instruction in chemistry for the whole University. After the death of Dean John Galbraith in 1914, he was made Dean of the Faculty of Applied Science, from which position he retired in 1919.

In the Medical Faculty, he held the position of Professor of Toxicology and Medical Jurisprudence from 1897 to 1913, when he was obliged to resign owing to the pressure of other work. For more than 30 years he was retained by the Attorney-General of Ontario as analyst and expert toxicologist in connection with criminal cases. During the same period he was Public Analyst for the Inland Revenue Department.

== Honours and later life ==
The variety and pressing nature of his daily work prevented him from writing any extensive scientific treatises; but numerous papers from his pen are to be found in the Transactions of the Canadian Institute, the Report of the Bureau of Mines and in the Transactions of the Royal Society.

In 1915 he was honoured by the University of Toronto with the degree LL.D., and in 1917 a similar honour was conferred upon him by McGill University.

In 1917 he was made Honorary Member of the Engineering Institute of Canada. He was a fellow of the Institute of Chemistry, and a Fellow of the Royal Society of Canada.

He was an ex-president of the Royal Canadian Institute, and ex-chairman of the Canadian Section of the Society of Chemical Industry.

Ellis died on 23 August 1920 while enjoying a holiday with his friend Dr. Rudolf on Lake Joseph in the Muskoka District.

== Personal life ==
Ellis married Ellen Maude Mickle in Wellington, Ontario, Canada, on 4 August 1875. Their son, the prominent British Canadian physician, pathologist, and Regius Professor of Medicine, Arthur William Mickle Ellis, was born in Toronto, Ontario, Canada on 4 May 1883. Their daughter, Ethel May Crooks (nee Ellis), was born sometime in 1876.
