= William Henry Ellis (politician) =

Newfoundland politician

William Henry Ellis (1819 – March 28, 1858) was an English-born politician in Newfoundland. He represented Fogo in the Newfoundland and Labrador House of Assembly from 1855 to 1858.

He was born on the Isle of Wight and came to Newfoundland around 1838. He was a member of a committee formed to protest a Fishery Convention between England and France in January 1857 granting the French fishing rights on the south and west portions of Newfoundland; the treaty was dropped by Britain in May of the same year. Ellis died in office in 1858.
