= William Henry Ellis (businessman) =

African American businessman

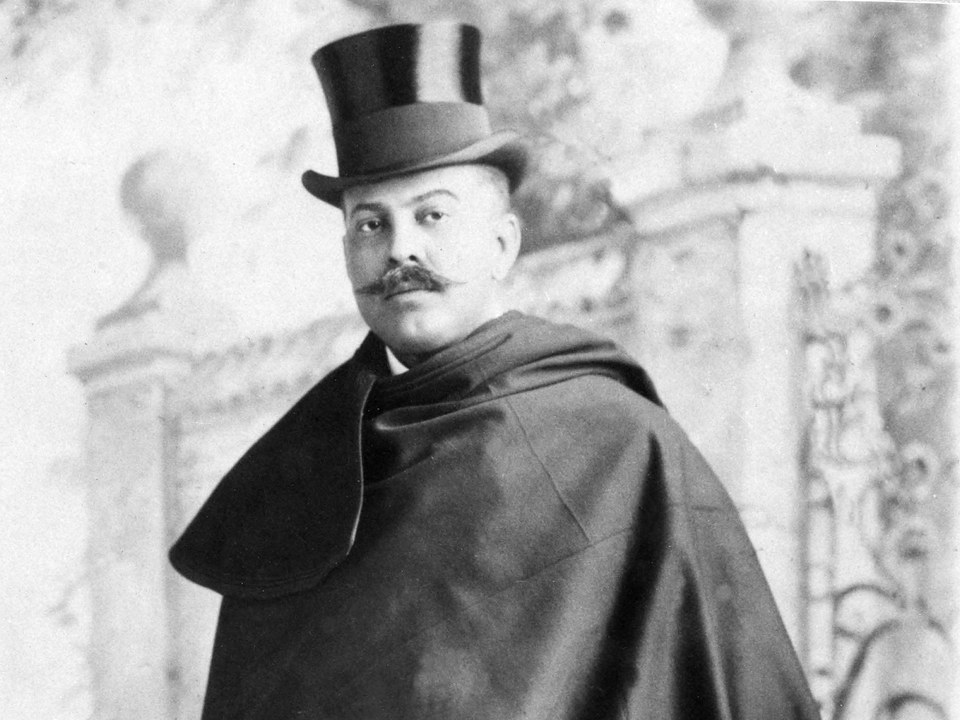
- Ellis in 1910
- Born: June 15, 1864; Victoria, Texas, U.S.
- Died: September 24, 1923 (aged 59); Mexico City, Mexico
- Occupation: businessman

William Henry Ellis (also known as Guillermo Enrique Eliseo; June 15, 1864 – September 24, 1923) was an American businessman.

== Early life ==
Ellis was born on June 15, 1864, in Victoria, Texas, to Charles Ellis and Margaret Nelson Ellis, former slaves. He later claimed that his parents were Cuban or Mexican, rather than African, and styled himself as "Guillermo Enrique Eliseo". Ellis was fluent in Spanish. He first worked on a ranch, assisted in leather dealing, and later inspecting customs, trading cattle, and growing cotton.

== Career and activism ==
In 1888 he started farming cattle in Mexico. In the late 19th century he was a member of the Republican Party, particularly supporting Norris Wright Cuney. Ellis also became close to Henry McNeal Turner. Both Turner and Cuney supported the back-to-Africa movement, while Ellis supported colonizing African-Americans to Latin America, specifically Mexico. While living in San Antonio, Ellis became known as an advocate for Black representation in Texas politics.

After this he became involved in an attempt to create a colony of Black people from the southern United States in Mexico. The country's president, Porfirio Díaz, approved the plan in 1888 and granted Ellis some land. By 1894 an agreement was signed for funding and Ellis agreed to provide as many as 20,000 Black people as workers in the Tlahualilo Municipality. Ellis hired R. A. “Pegleg” Williams, and in 1895, 816 emigrants were transferred from Alabama. Although some sources say this was the only trip, others list there as being at least 2,000 emigrants. The southern press criticized the colony and reported poor living conditions. After an investigation, the conditions were found to be poor but not as bad as had been reported. The colony failed, and the US federal government funded the return of all involved families. Ellis became involved in the brokerage business, leading a water company that supplied The Bronx and was valued at $10,000,000. He eventually sold this to New York City.

In 1904, Ellis sought to become the king of the Ethiopian Empire, in what was later known as the "Abyssinia affair". He worked with the United States Department of State, specifically Robert Peet Skinner, to make a treaty between Menelik II and the United States. After Frederick Kent Loomis, one of Ellis's collaborators, disappeared, Ellis took the treaty to Menelik and was made a duke in the kingdom. The treaty itself was described by the Handbook of Texas as creating "an impetus for forging an official relationship between the two countries." He returned to the US in 1904, living in Mount Vernon, New York. Ellis also purchased a seat on the New York Stock Exchange and was involved with organizations such as the Metropolitan Museum of Art.

== Personal life ==
He married Ida Lefferts Sherwood in 1903; the two had four children.

== Death and legacy ==
On September 24, 1923, Ellis died in Mexico City.

In 2016, Karl Jacoby wrote The Strange Career of William Ellis: The Texas Slave Who Became a Mexican Millionaire. In 2019 Phillip Rodriguez announced that he would make a documentary based on the book.
