= William Henry Ellis (engineer) =

British civil engineer

Sir William Henry Ellis GBE
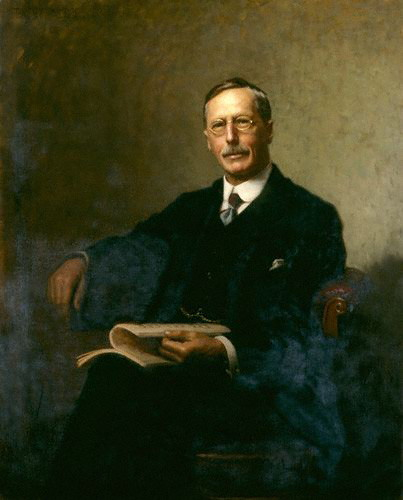
- Born: 20 August 1860; Sheffield
- Died: 4 July 1945 (aged 84)
- Engineering career
- Discipline: Civil,
- Institutions: Institution of Civil Engineers (president)

Sir William Henry Ellis (20 August 1860 – 4 July 1945) was a British civil engineer and steel maker.

Ellis was born on 20 August 1860 in Pitsmoor, Sheffield, Yorkshire. He was the son of John Devonshire Ellis (1824–1906) and, his wife, Elizabeth Bourne. In 1889 Ellis married Lucy Rimington, the daughter of Francis William Tetley who was a director of Joshua Tetley & Son, the brewery in Leeds. Together they had two sons and two daughters. Ellis was a steel maker and in 1914 was elected Master Cutler, the head of the Company of Cutlers in Hallamshire and ambassador of industry for Sheffield. His tenure as Master Cutler, a position which usually changes each year, lasted until 1918 due to the outbreak of the First World War. In 1918 he was awarded the honorary degree of Doctor of Engineering by the University of Sheffield.

Ellis was elected president of the Institution of Civil Engineers for the November 1925 to November 1926 session. On 28 June 1926 he was appointed by the Home Secretary, William Joynson-Hicks, 1st Viscount Brentford, to sit on a commission which had been established to enquire into the conditions of mining and drainage in the county borough Doncaster in the West Riding of Yorkshire. The commission was a tribunal of inquiry as established by the Tribunals of Inquiry (Evidence) Act of 1921 and was established to inquire about what effect mining had had on drainage in the area, what the current efficiency of land drainage systems was and how best to manage the issue in the future. At the time of the inquiry Ellis was a Knight Grand Cross of the Order of the British Empire, and hence entitled to use the title of "Sir". His wife, Lucy, died in 1938 and by 1942 he was living in Ecclesall, Sheffield. Ellis died on 4 July 1945.

Professional and academic associations
Preceded by Basil Mott	President of the Institution of Civil Engineers; November 1925 – November 1926	Succeeded by Frederick Palmer
