= Hispanic and Latino conservatism in the United States =

Movement within conservatism

Hispanic and Latino Americans make up an increasing share of the United States (U.S.) electorate. While most Latinos identify as Democrats and most Latino elected officials are members of the Democratic Party, there has been an increase in Republican party identification among Latinos and increased numbers of elected Latino Republicans over time.

Scholars note that Latinos and Hispanics are not a monolithic group. Factors such as age, location, income, sex, religion, ethnicity, education, and immigration status can all significantly influence voting factors among Hispanics and Latinos. Historically, Cuban Americans in South Florida have been the most prominent Latino Republicans. Since the 1960s, the majority of Latino Republican candidates for office have been Cuban Americans. Over time, Latino Republicans have become more diverse, no longer being primarily confined to Cuban Americans.

== History ==
The U.S. Census indicates that the Hispanic and Latino population of the U.S. is the fastest growing minority group in the country. More than 12.8% of eligible voters nationwide are Hispanic or Latino.

=== 20th century ===
Prior to the 1950s, Hispanic political affiliation swayed back and forth between the two major parties. From the American Civil War to the Great Depression, the majority of American Hispanics, as well as the majority of African Americans, were Republicans. However, following the Great Depression, more Hispanics began to side with the Democratic party due to Franklin D. Roosevelt and his New Deal agenda. Many Hispanics were distrustful of Herbert Hoover and the Republican party, whom they viewed as responsible for the economic crash.

American Hispanics first began to widely support a Republican candidate, Dwight D. Eisenhower, during the 1952 U.S. presidential election. Hispanic World War II veterans were drawn to support Eisenhower due to his service in the war, as well as the belief that he would be able to end the Korean war. Other non-veteran Hispanic voters were drawn to Eisenhower due to his promotion of hard work, freedom, prosperity, and religious spirituality. Hispanic conservatives created groups such as "Latinos con Eisenhower" and pinned political buttons on their shirts stating "Me Gusta Ike".

In 1980, Republican Ben Fernandez became the first Hispanic ever to run for President of the United States. Over the next decade, Ronald Reagan viewed Hispanic and Latino social values as closely related to conservative values, as both tended to place an emphasis on religious faith, family, and hard work. Additionally, both groups tended to maintain a strong opposition to abortion and same-sex marriage. Reagan often stated that "Hispanics are conservative. They just don’t know it.”

=== 21st century ===
In 2004, according to research by the Thomás Rivera Policy Institute, 22% of Hispanic and Latino voters self-identified as Republicans. In 2006, 30% supported Republican candidates. In 2008, 31% of Hispanics voted for then-Republican presidential nominee John McCain. During the 2010 midterm elections, 38% of Latinos supported Republican candidates. In 2012, 20% of Hispanic voters identified with, or leaned toward, the Republican Party.

During the 2016 presidential election, Republican presidential nominee Donald Trump was supported by 57% of Cuban-American voters in Florida.

In the 2018 midterm elections, the Democratic Party had lost ground among their voting population since its high-water mark in 2012. 27% of Hispanic voters identified with, or leaned toward, the Republican Party. Hispanic voters who primarily spoke English were more likely to support Republican candidates (33%), compared to voters who only spoke Spanish (15%). In Florida, 66% of Cuban Americans supported Republican gubernatorial nominee Ron DeSantis, while only 33% supported Democratic gubernatorial nominee Andrew Gillum, a 2 to 1 ratio for Republicans.

According to a 2019 Gallup Poll, 29% of Hispanics and Latinos identified as conservative, and that same number, 29%, voted for Donald Trump in the 2016 Presidential Election.

In 2020 United States presidential election in Florida, Trump earned strong Latino support among Cuban and South American communities in Miami-Dade County and 46% of the statewide Latino vote, much higher than his 35% in 2016. Trump's campaign anti-socialist messaging drove the shift. Additionally, in heavily Latino South Texas, Biden lost ground compared to Hillary Clinton in 2016, especially in rural counties.

In the 2022 U.S. House Elections, 39% of Hispanic voters backed Republican candidates.

Latinos proved extremely helpful in Donald Trump's 2024 presidential victory. Nationwide, according to a Pew Research Center analysis of validated voters, he won 48% of the Latino vote up from 36% in 2020. He also won Latino men outright, with 50% of their vote. As Latinos were crucial to delivering President Joe Biden the White House in 2020, Trump's gains in several swing states helped him win back states he lost to Biden, such as Arizona and Nevada.

This shift was most noticeable in Texas and Florida, where Trump widened his electoral margins from 2020. Miami-Dade County, home to the heavily Latino city of Miami, gave 55.35% of its vote to Trump, the first time this has occurred since 1988. Statewide, he won 58% of Latino voters. In South Texas, especially the Rio Grande Valley and other counties along the border, the Democratic vote-shedding that began four years earlier became much more apparent as Donald Trump flipped Hidalgo, Cameron, Webb, Duval, Starr, Culberson, Maverick, and Willacy County. Each of these counties is overwhelmingly Latino, with some having not voted for a Republican presidential candidate for nearly a century. For example, Webb County last voted for a Republican for president in 1912, while Duval and Starr Counties had not voted for a Republican since 1904 and 1892, respectively. Statewide, Trump received 55% of Texas's Latino vote.

Republicans are often supported by Cuban-American and Venezuelan-American voters, as well as among Latino voters in Florida and Texas.

== Beliefs ==
A 1992 study found that Latinos are more likely to support government programs focused on crime control and drug prevention, child care services, environmental protection, science and technology, defense, and programs for refugees and immigrants.

In 2024, a Pew Research Center survey found that 85% of Latino registered voters considered the economy very important in the presidential election. Healthcare followed at 71%, while violent crime and gun policy each came in at 62%, followed by immigration at 59%. The survey also revealed differences in issue priorities between Latino supporters of the two major presidential candidates. For instance, 71% of Latino supporters of Donald Trump considered immigration a very important issue, compared with 51% of Latino supporters of Kamala Harris.

=== Economy ===
According to the National Exit Poll, 60% of Latino voters identified the economy as the country's most important issue in 2012. In 2022, economic issues remain the primary concern for Hispanic voters. In a Wall Street Journal poll, Hispanic men stated that Republicans possessed better economic policy, by a margin of 17 points, while Hispanic women stated that Democrats had better economic policy, by a 10-point margin.

=== Gun control ===
According to a 2022 Pew Research Center poll, 54% of Hispanic Republicans and conservative-leaning independents find it more important to protect gun ownership rights than to control gun ownership. In comparison, 83% of non-Hispanic Republicans hold the same belief.

=== Gender-neutral terminology ===
The use of the gender-neutral term "Latinx" is highly unpopular among Hispanic and Latino voters, with over 90% disliking the term. The term has been used by prominent Democratic politicians such as Joe Biden, Elizabeth Warren, and Alexandria Ocasio-Cortez; who have been widely mocked by many Republicans, Hispanics, and Latinos for its use.

A 2021 poll found that 30% of Hispanic voters are less likely to vote for a politician who uses the term "Latinx". 68% of Hispanic voters prefer the term "Hispanic", while 21% of voters prefer the term "Latino". By comparison, only 2% of Hispanic voters embrace the term "Latinx". Furthermore, 40% of American Hispanics state that the term "Latinx" bothers or offends them.

=== Immigration ===
Hispanic voters who are immigrants or the children of immigrants are more likely to vote for the Democratic Party, while Hispanic voters whose ancestors have lived in the United States for multiple generations are more likely to be split or vote for the Republican Party.

== Timeline of events ==
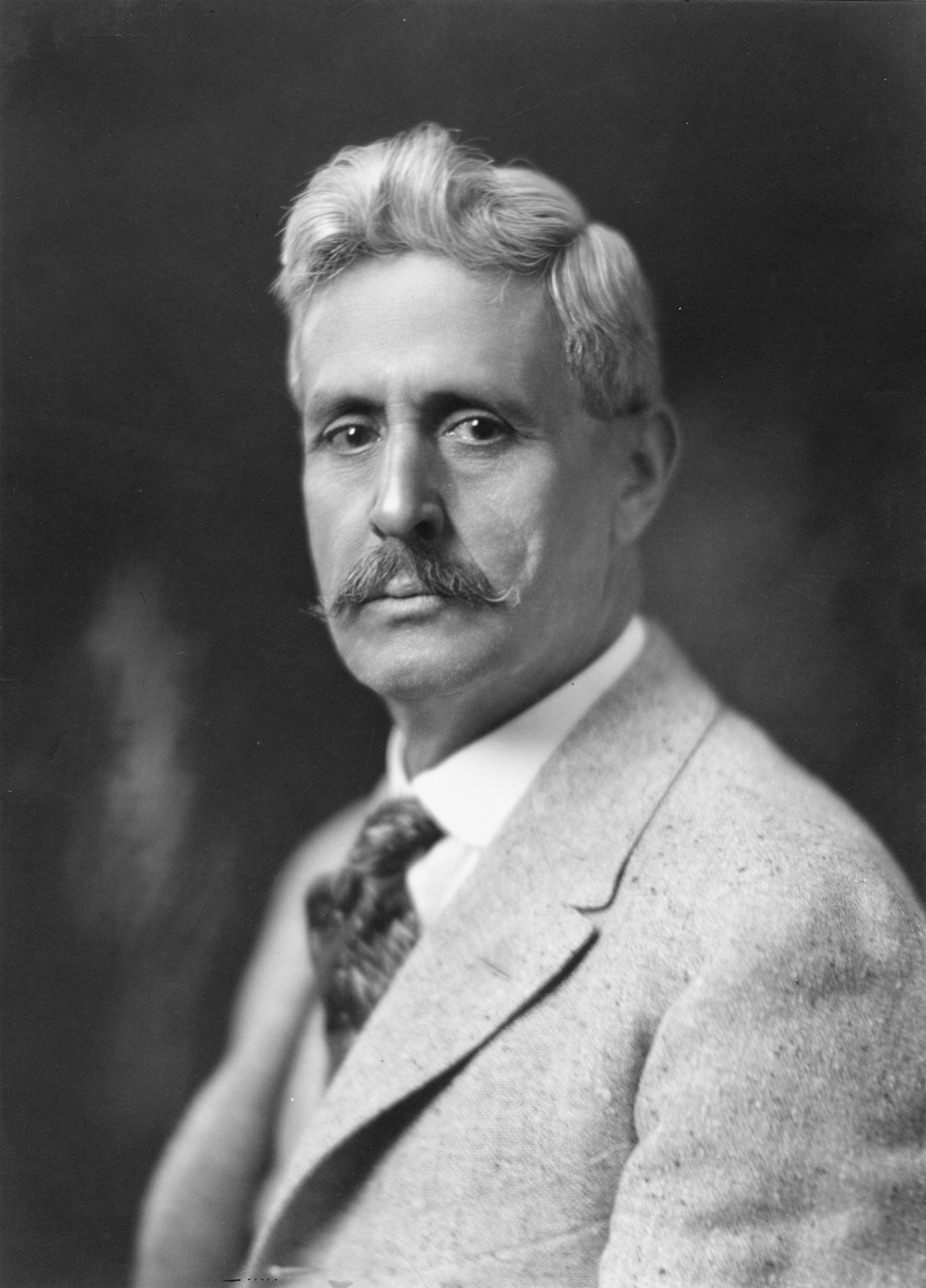
Octaviano Larrazolo, the first Hispanic person to ever serve in the U.S. Senate

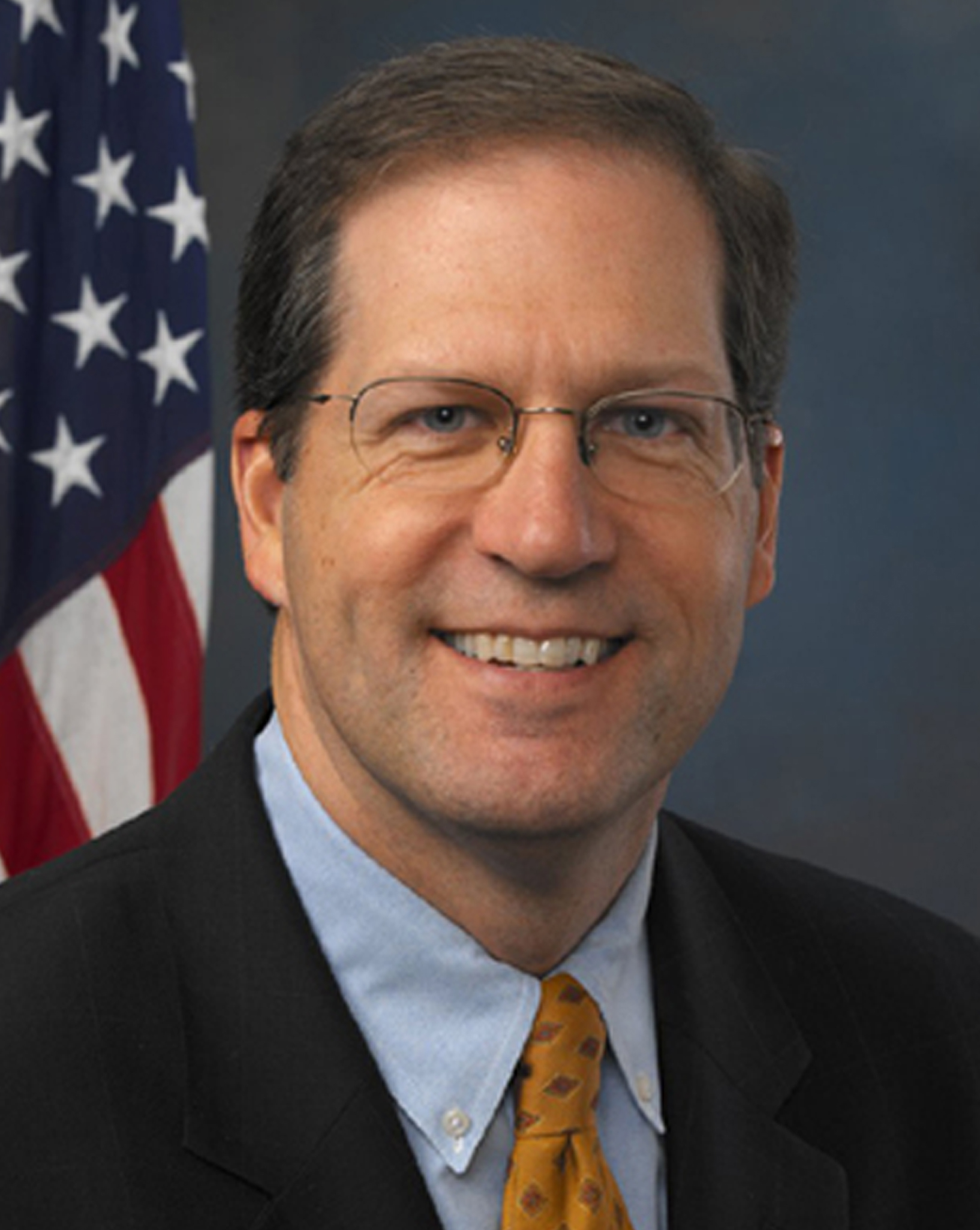
John E. Sununu

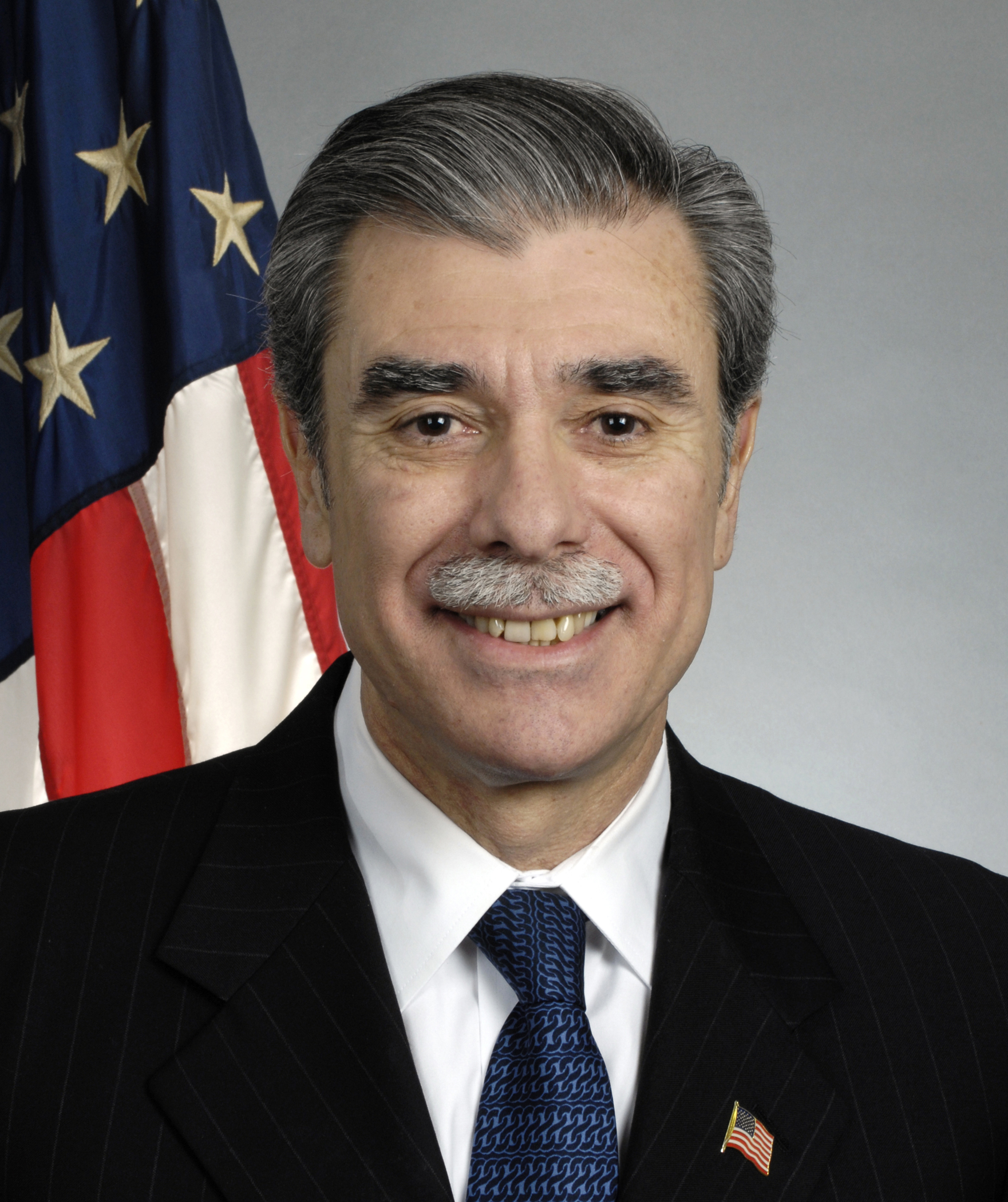
Carlos Gutierrez, the only Hispanic to ever serve as the U.S. Secretary of Commerce

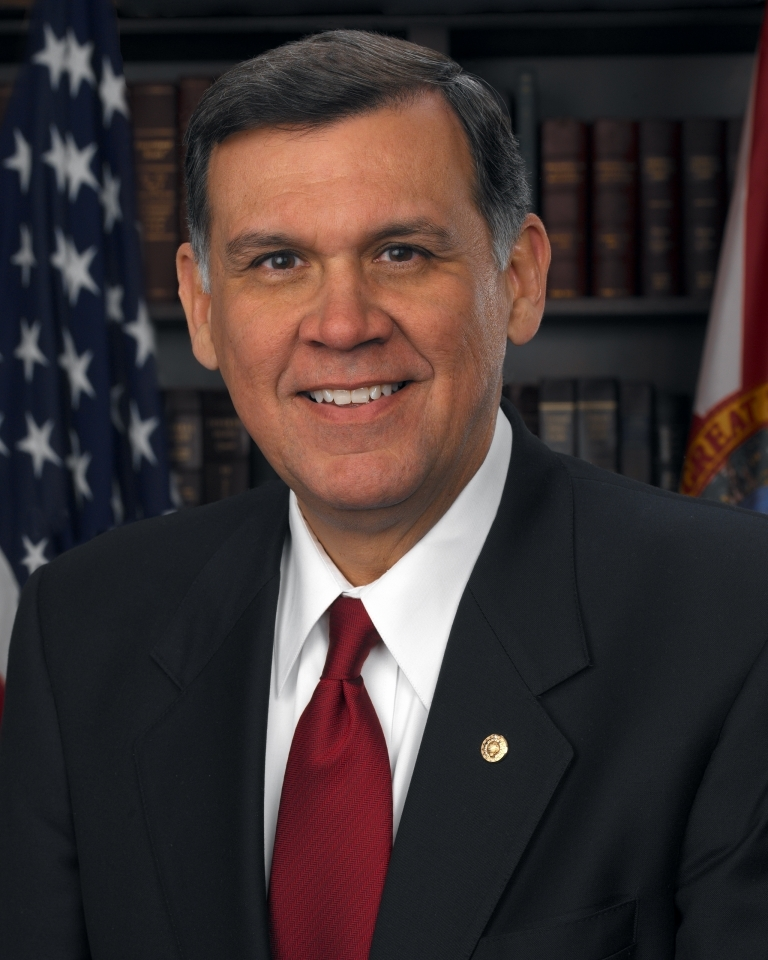
Mel Martínez

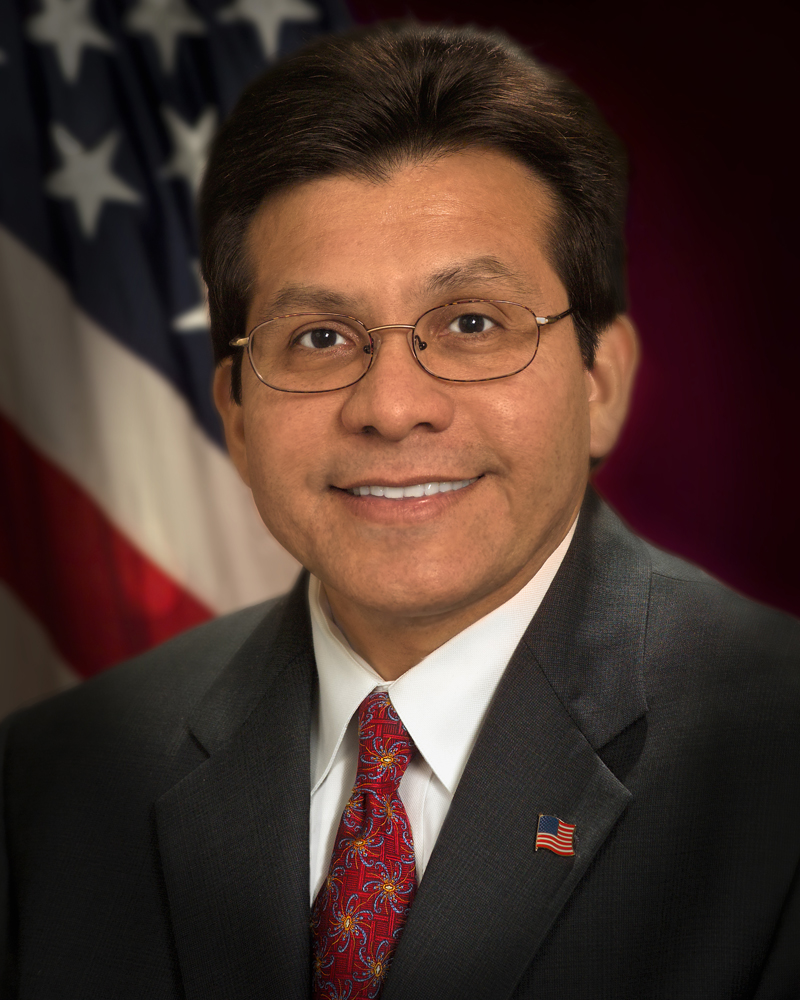
Alberto Gonzales, the only Hispanic to ever serve as the U.S. Attorney General

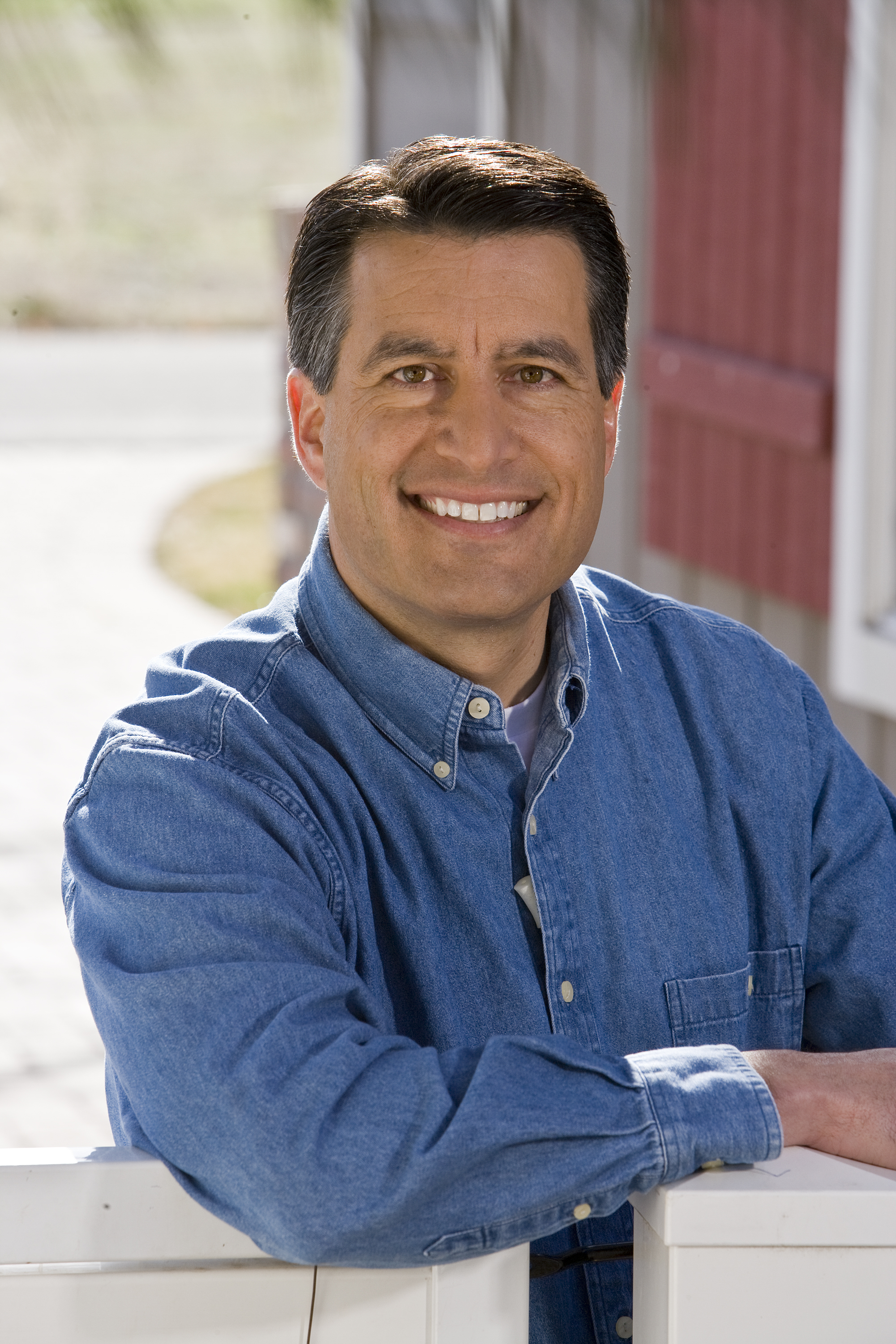
Brian Sandoval

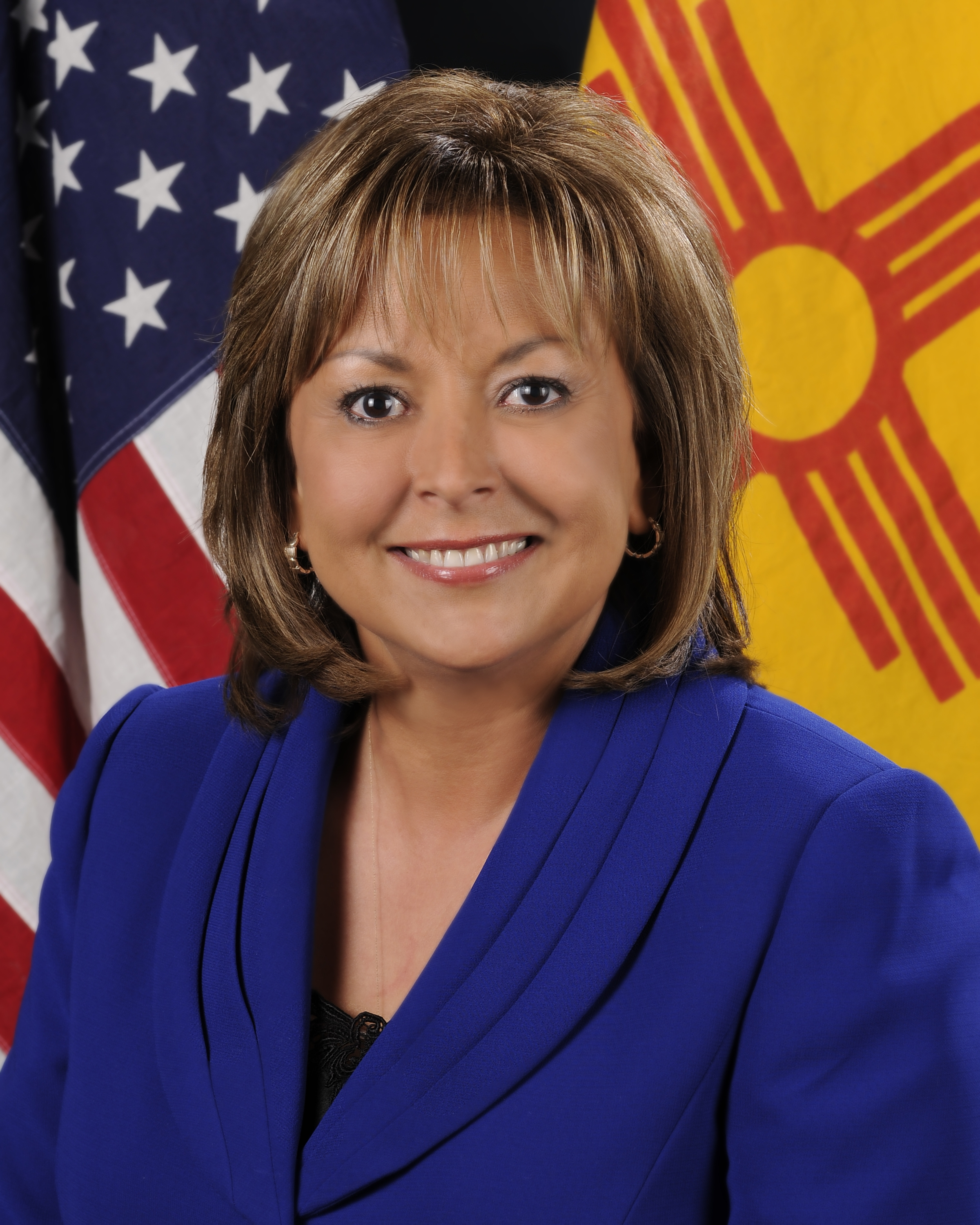
Susana Martinez, the only Republican Latina ever elected governor of a U.S. state

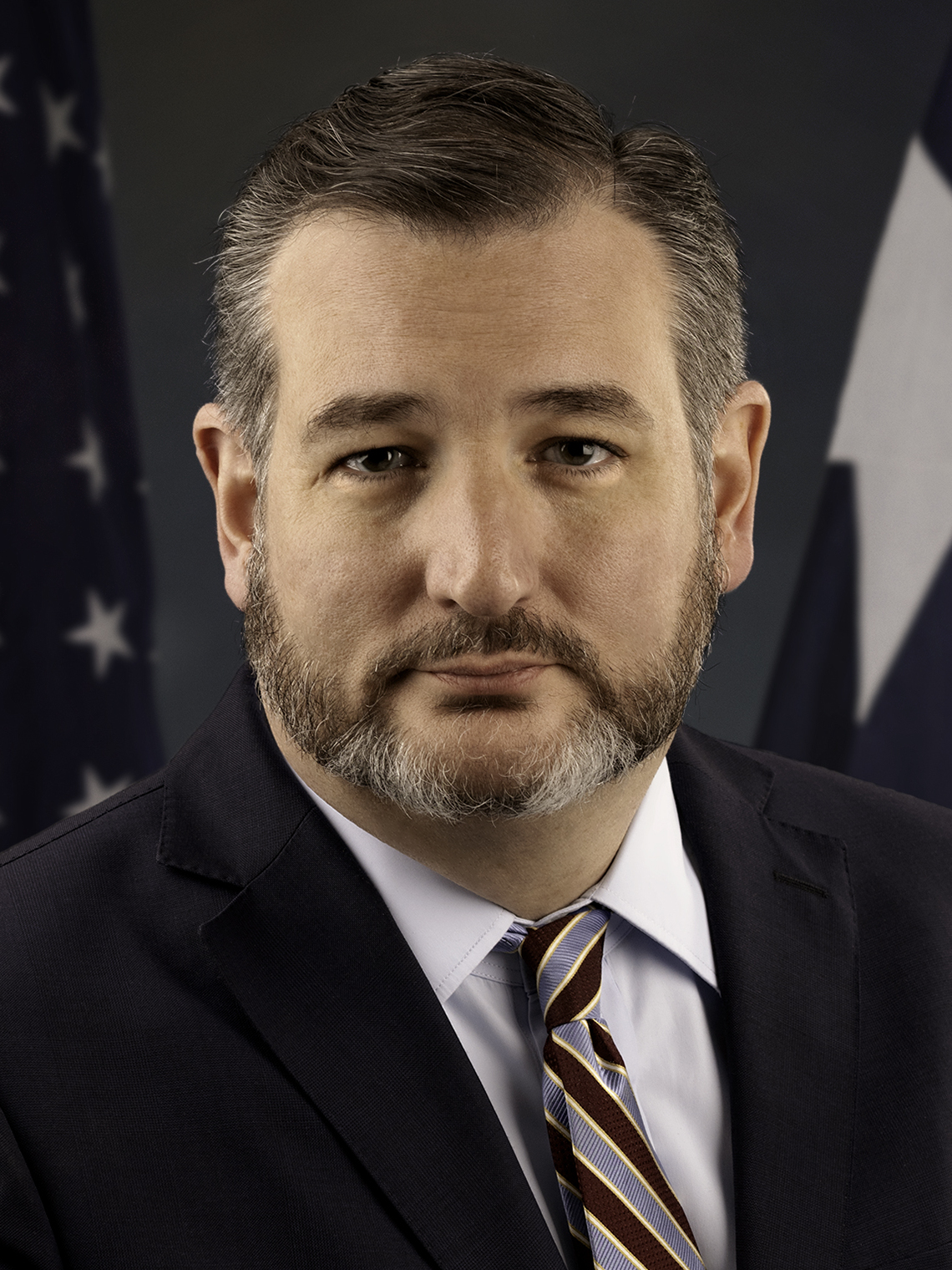
Ted Cruz, 2016 Presidential Candidate who garnered over 7,000,000 votes

Alexander Acosta

Lori Chavez-DeRemer

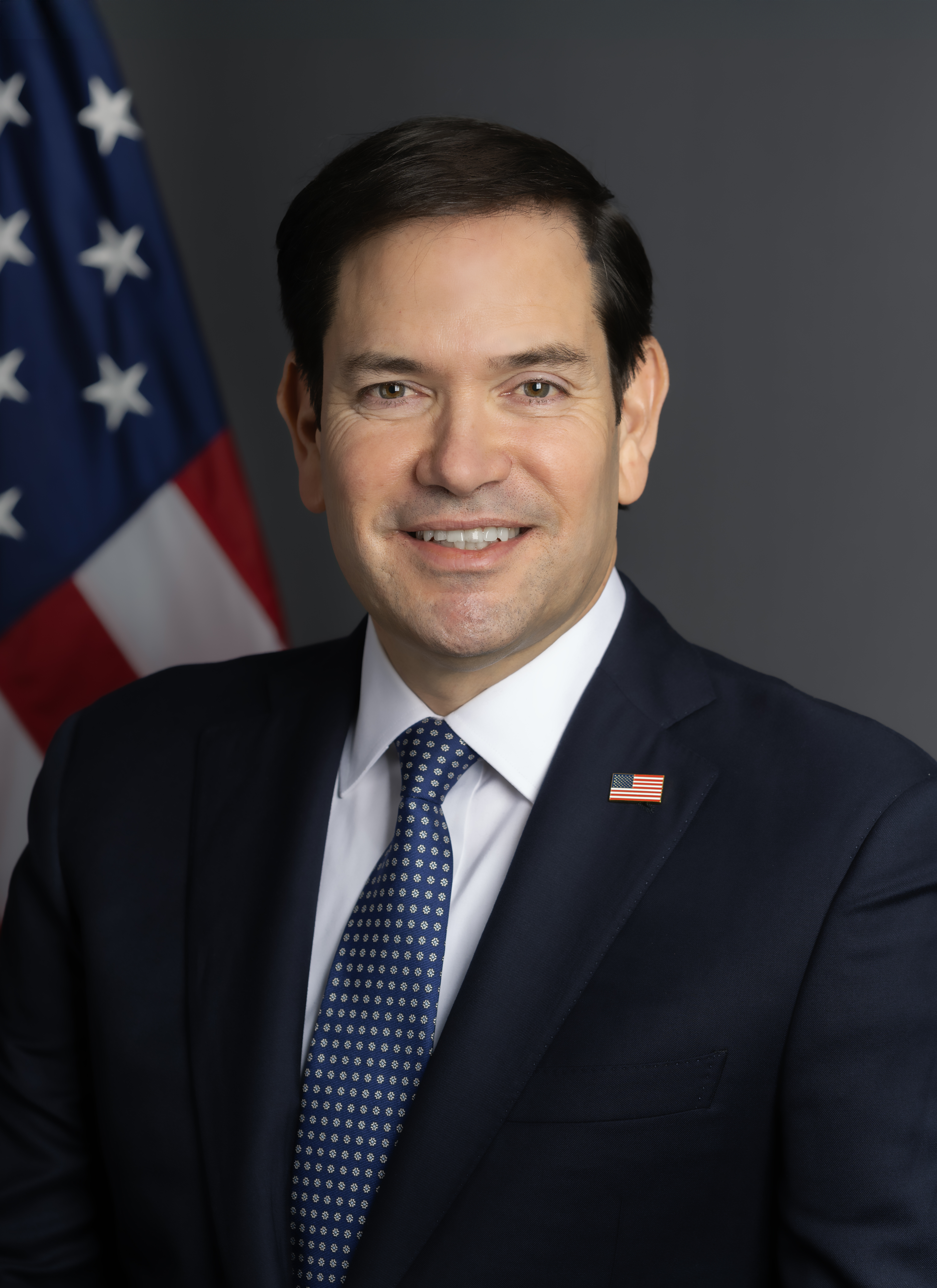
Marco Rubio, the only Hispanic to ever serve as U.S. Secretary of State

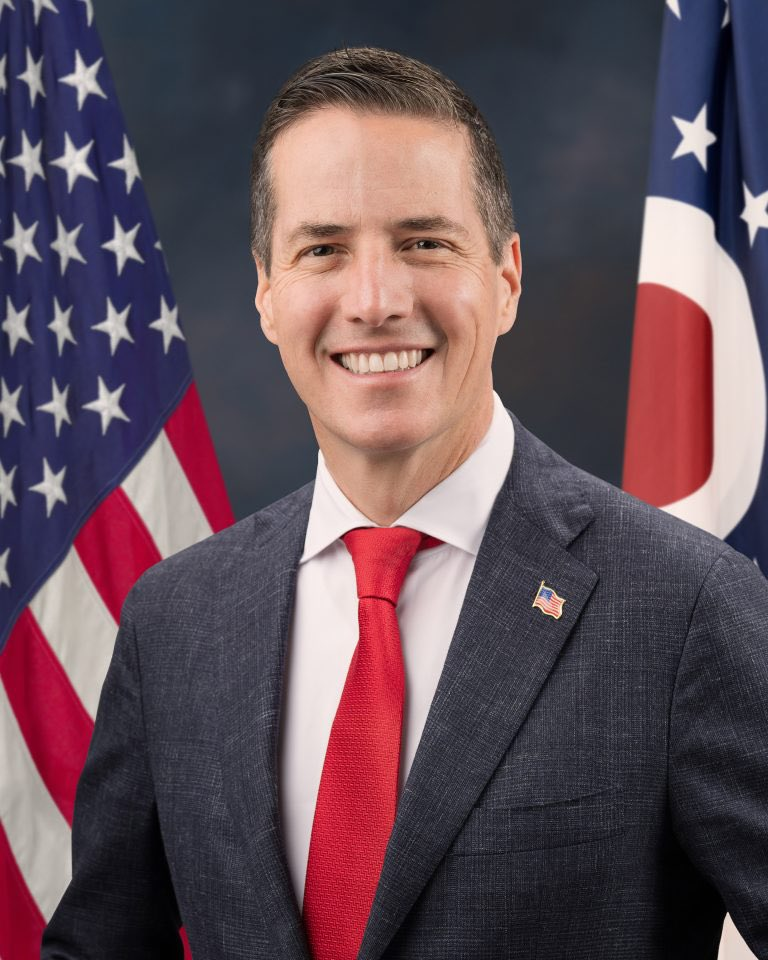
Bernie Moreno

This is a timeline of significant events in Spanish, Hispanic and Latino history that have shaped the conservative movement in the United States.

=== 1920s ===
- 1920 – Néstor Montoya is elected to the U.S. House of Representatives from New Mexico's at-large congressional district
- 1928 – Octaviano Ambrosio Larrazolo elected as United States senator from New Mexico

=== 1960s ===
- 1967 – Ben Fernandez creates the Republican National Hispanic Assembly
- 1968 - Manuel Lujan, Jr. is elected to the U.S. House of Representatives from New Mexico's 1st congressional district

=== 1970s ===
- 1977 – Baltasar Corrada del Río is elected to U.S. Congress (Resident commissioner of Puerto Rico)

=== 1980s ===
- 1982 - Barbara Vucanovich is elected to the U.S. House of Representatives from Nevada's 2nd congressional district
- 1987 – Bob Martinez elected as Governor of Florida
- 1989 – Manuel Lujan, Jr. is appointed United States Secretary of the Interior by President George H.W. Bush
- 1988 - Ileana Ros–Lehtinen is elected to the U.S. House of Representatives from Florida's 18th congressional district

=== 1990s ===
- 1992 – Henry Bonilla is elected to the U.S. House of Representatives from Texas's 23rd congressional district
- 1994 - Congresswoman Barbara Vucanovich is elected Secretary of the House Republican Conference
- 1996 – John E. Sununu is elected to the U.S. House of Representatives from New Hampshire's 1st congressional district

=== 2000s ===
- 2000 – Democratic Congressman Matthew G. Martinez joins the Republican party
- 2001 – Mel Martínez is appointed United States Secretary of Housing and Urban Development by President George W. Bush:
- 2002 - Mario Díaz–Balart is elected to the U.S. House of Representatives from Florida's 25th congressional district
- 2002 - John E. Sununu is elected to the United States Senate from New Hampshire
- 2004 - Mel Martínez is elected to the United States Senate from Florida
- 2004 - Luis Fortuño is elected to the U.S. House of Representatives as Resident Commissioner of the Philippines (non voting delegate)
- 2005 – Alberto Gonzales is appointed United States Attorney General by President George W. Bush
- 2005 - Carlos Gutierrez is appointed United States Secretary of Commerce by President George W. Bush
- 2008 – Luis Fortuño is elected Governor of Puerto Rico

=== 2010s ===
- 2010 – Marco Rubio is elected to the United States Senate from Florida
- 2010 - Quico Canseco is elected to the U.S. House of Representatives from Texas's 23rd congressional district
- 2010 - Bill Flores is elected to the U.S. House of Representatives from Texas's 17th congressional district
- 2010 - Jaime Herrera Beutler is elected to the U.S. House of Representatives from Washington's 3rd congressional district
- 2010 - Raúl Labrador is elected to the U.S. House of Representatives from Idaho's 1st congressional district
- 2010 - David Rivera is elected to the U.S. House of Representatives from Florida's 25th congressional district
- 2010 - Susana Martinez is elected Governor of New Mexico
- 2010 - Brian Sandoval is elected Governor of Nevada
- 2012 – Ted Cruz is elected to the United States Senate from Texas
- 2012 - Scott Perry is elected to the U.S. House of Representatives from Pennsylvania's 4th congressional district
- 2014 - Carlos Curbelo is elected to the U.S. House of Representatives from Florida's 26th congressional district
- 2014 - Alex Mooney is elected to the U.S. House of Representatives from West Virginia's 2nd congressional district
- 2014 - Former Democratic congressman Joe Baca California joins GOP
- 2016 – Ted Cruz and Marco Rubio unsuccessfully sought the Republican presidential nomination with Cruz receiving 7,822,100 votes and Rubio receiving 3,515,576 votes
- 2016 – Jenniffer González is elected to the U.S. House of Representatives as Resident Commissioner of Puerto Rico (non voting delegate)
- 2016 - Brian Mast is elected to the U.S. House of Representatives from Florida's 21st congressional district
- 2017 – Alexander Acosta is appointed United States Secretary of Labor by President Donald Trump
- 2018 - Anthony Gonzalez is elected to the U.S. House of Representatives from Ohio's 16th congressional district

=== 2020s ===
- 2020 – Rocky De La Fuente unsuccessfully sought the Republican presidential nomination
- 2020 – Mike Garcia is elected to the U.S. House of Representatives from California's 25th congressional district
- 2020 - Carlos A. Giménez is elected to the U.S. House of Representatives from Florida's 26th congressional district
- 2020 - Tony Gonzales is elected to the U.S. House of Representatives from Texas's 23rd congressional district
- 2020 - Nicole Malliotakis is elected to the U.S. House of Representatives from New York's 11th congressional district
- 2020 - Maria Elvira Salazar is elected to the U.S. House of Representatives from Florida's 27th congressional district
- 2022 – Mayra Flores is elected to the U.S. House of Representatives from Texas's 34th congressional district
- 2022 - Lori Chavez-DeRemer is elected to the U.S. House of Representatives from Oregon's 5th congressional district
- 2022 - Juan Ciscomani is elected to the U.S. House of Representatives from Arizona's 6th congressional district
- 2022 - Anthony D'Esposito is elected to the U.S. House of Representatives from New York's 4th congressional district
- 2022 - Monica De La Cruz is elected to the U.S. House of Representatives from Texas's 15th congressional district
- 2022 - Anna Paulina Luna is elected to the U.S. House of Representatives from Florida's 13th congressional district
- 2022 - George Santos is elected to the U.S. House of Representatives from New York's 3rd congressional district
- 2022 - James Moylan is elected to the U.S. House of Representatives from Guam's at-large congressional district (non voting delegate)
- 2023 - Congressman George Santos is expelled from the U.S. House of Representatives
- 2024 – Francis Suarez unsuccessfully sought the Republican presidential nomination
- 2024 – Greg Lopez is elected to the U.S. House of Representatives from Colorado's 4th congressional district
- 2024 - Gabe Evans is elected to the U.S. House of Representatives from Colorado's 8th congressional district
- 2024 - Abraham Hamadeh is elected to the U.S. House of Representatives from Arizona's 8th congressional district
- 2024 - Bernie Moreno is elected to the United States Senate from Ohio
- 2024 - Jenniffer González-Colón is elected governor of Puerto Rico
- 2025 – Marco Rubio is appointed United States Secretary of State by president Donald Trump
- 2025 - Lori Chavez-DeRemer is appointed United States Secretary of Labor by President Donald Trump
- 2026 - Michael Alfonso is elected to the U.S. House of Representatives from Wisconsin's 7th congressional district

== Politicians ==
=== Alaska ===
- Jamie Allard – Alaska State representative (2023–present)

=== Arizona ===
- Steve Montenegro – Arizona State representative (2009–2017 & 2023–present), Arizona State senator (2017), and Speaker of the Arizona House of Representatives (2025–present)
- Lupe Diaz – Arizona State representative (2021–present)
- Teresa Martinez – Arizona State representative (2021–present)
- Michele Pena – Arizona State representative (2023–present)
- Austin Smith – Arizona State representative (2023–2025)

=== Arkansas ===
- Justin Gonzales – Arkansas State representative (2015–present)
- Jim Sorvillo – Arkansas State representative (2015–present)

=== California ===
- Fred Aguilar – California State Assemblyman (1992–1998)
- Rod Pacheco – California State Assemblyman (1996–2002) and Riverside County District Attorney (2007–2011)
- Bob Pacheco – California State Assemblyman (1998–2004)
- Charlene Zettel – California State Assemblywoman (1998–2002)
- Bonnie Garcia – California State Assemblywoman (2002–2008)
- Kimberly Guilfoyle – First Lady of San Francisco (2004-2006)
- Rocky Chavez – California State Assemblyman (2012–2018)
- Eric Linder – California State Assemblyman (2012–2016)
- Melissa Melendez – California State Assemblywoman (2012–2020) and California State senator (2020–2022)
- Heath Flora – California State Assemblyman (2016–present)
- Dante Acosta – California State Assemblyman (2016–2018)
- Rosilicie Ochoa Bogh – California State senator (2020–present)
- Suzette Martinez Valladares – California State Assemblywoman (2020–2022) and California State senator (2024–present)
- Kevin Lincoln – mayor of Stockton (2021–present)
- Kate Sanchez – California State Assemblywoman (2022–present)
- Juan Alanis - California State Assemblyman (2022–present)
- Josh Hoover - California State Assemblyman (2022–present)
- Marie Alvarado-Gil – California State senator (2022–present; elected as a Democrat, switched to Republican in August 2024)
- Alexandra Macedo – California State Assemblywoman (2024–present)
- Jeff Gonzalez – California State Assemblyman (2024–present)
- Leticia Castillo – California State Assemblywoman (2024–present)
- Natasha Johnson – California State Assemblywoman (2025–present)

=== Colorado ===
- Carlos Barron – Colorado State Representative (2025–present)
- Ryan Gonzalez – Colorado State Representative (2025–present)
- Lori Garcia Sander – Colorado State Representative (2025–present)
- Gabe Evans – Colorado State Representative (2023–2025)
- Andres Pico – Colorado State representative (2021–2023)
- Dave Williams – Colorado State representative (2017–2023) and Chairman of the Colorado Republican Party
- Philip Covarrubias – Colorado State representative (2017–2019)
- Beth Martinez Humenik – Colorado State senator (2015–2019)
- Clarice Navarro – Colorado State representative (2013–2017)
- George Rivera – Colorado State senator (2013–2015)
- Robert Ramirez – Colorado State representative (2011–2013)
- Stella Garza–Hicks – Colorado State representative (2007–2009)
- Lionel Rivera – mayors of Colorado Springs (2003–2011)

=== Connecticut ===
- Aundre Bumgardner – Connecticut State representative (2015–2017)
- Art Linares – Connecticut State senator (2013–2019)

=== Delaware ===
- Ernesto Lopez – Delaware senator (2012–2023)
- Joseph Miró – Delaware State representative (1998–2018)

=== Florida ===
- Humberto Cortina – Florida State representative (1982–1984)
- Roberto Casas – Florida State representative (1982–1988) and Florida State senator (1988–2000)
- Javier Souto – Florida State senator (1984–1992)
- Luis C. Morse – Florida State representative (1984–1998)
- Alberto Gutman – Florida State representative (1984–1992) and Florida State senator (1992–1998)
- Arnhilda Gonzalez–Quevedo – Florida State representative (1984–1988)
- Luis E. Rojas – Florida State representative (1988–1998)
- Carlos L. Valdes – Florida State representative (1988–2000)
- Nilo Juri – Florida State representative (1988–1993)
- Miguel De Grandy – Florida State representative (1989–1994)
- Gilda Oliveros – Mayor of Hialeh Gardens (1989–1994)
- Carlos A. Manrique – Florida State representative (1992–1994)
- Eladio Armesto–Garcia – Florida State representative (1992–1994)
- Bruno Barreiro – Florida State representative (1992–1998)
- Carlos A. Lacasa – Florida State representative (1994–2002)
- Jorge Rodriguez-Chomat – Florida State representative (1994–1998)
- Gustavo Barreiro – Florida State representative (1996–2008)
- Gaston Cantens – Florida State representative (1996–2004)
- Manuel Prieguez – Florida State representative (1998–2004)
- Al Cardenas – chairman of the Republican Party of Florida (1999–2003)
- Ralph Arza – Florida State representative (2000–2006)
- Alex Diaz de la Portilla – Florida State senator (2000–2010)
- Renier Díaz de la Portilla – Florida State representative (2000–2002)
- René García – Florida State representative (2000–2010) and Florida State senator (2010–2018)
- Rudy Garcia – Florida State senator (2000–2010)
- Joe Negron – Florida State representative (2000–2006) and Florida State senator (2009–2018)
- J. Alex Villalobos – Florida State senator (2001–2010)
- Carl J. Domino – Florida State representative (2002–2010) and U.S. House nominee (2014)
- Marcelo Llorente – Florida State representative (2002–2010)
- Juan–Carlos Planas – Florida State representative (2002–2010)
- John Quiñones – Florida State representative (2002–2007) and U.S. House Candidate (2012)
- Juan C. Zapata – Florida State representative (2002–2010)
- Michael Bileca – Florida State Representative (2002–2018)
- Anitere Flores – Florida State representative (2004–2010) and Florida State senator (2010–2018)
- Julio Robaina – mayor of Hialeah (2005–2011)
- Eduardo González – Florida State representative (2006–2014)
- Esteban Bovo – Florida State representative (2008–2010)
- Erik Fresen – Florida State representative (2008–2016)
- Tomás Regalado – mayor of Miami (2009–2017)
- Fred Costello – Florida State representative (2010–2012 & 2014–2016) and U.S. House Candidate (2012)
- Frank Artiles – Florida State representative (2010–2016) & Florida State senator (2016–2017)
- Miguel Diaz de la Portilla – Florida State senator (2010–2016)
- Jose Felix Diaz – Florida State representative (2010–2017)
- Jeanette Núñez – Florida State representative (2010–2018)
- Ana Rivas Logan – Florida State representative (2010–2012)
- Carlos Trujillo – Florida State representative (2010–2018)
- Jose R. Oliva – Florida State representative (2011–2020)
- Carlos Hernandez – mayor of Hialeah, Florida (2011–present)
- Mike La Rosa – Florida State representative (2012–2020)
- Manny Díaz Jr. – Florida State representative (2012–2018) & Florida State senator (2018–2022)
- Ray Rodrigues – Florida State representative (2012–2020) & Florida State senator (2020–2022)
- David Santiago – Florida State representative (2012–2020)
- Bob Cortes – Florida State representative (2014–2018)
- Rene Plasencia – Florida State representative (2014–2022)
- Julio Gonzalez – Florida State representative (2014–2018)
- Bryan Avila – Florida State representative (2014–2022) & Florida State senator (2022–present)
- Jackie Toledo – Florida State representative (2016–2022)
- Daniel Anthony Perez – Florida State representative (2017–present)
- Francis Suarez – mayor of Miami (2017–present)
- Ana Maria Rodriguez – Florida State representative (2018–2020) & Florida State senator (2020–present)
- Anthony Rodriguez – Florida State representative (2018–2022)
- Juan Fernandez–Barquin – Florida State representative (2018–present)
- Ileana Garcia – Florida State senator (2020–present)
- David Borrero – Florida State representative (2020–present)
- Adam Botana – Florida State representative (2020–present)
- Demi Busatta Cabrera – Florida State representative (2020–present)
- Alex Rizo – Florida State representative (2020–present)
- Alexis Calatayud – Florida State senator (2022–present)
- Carolina Amesty – Florida State representative (2022–2024)
- Karen Gonzalez Pittman – Florida State representative (2022–present)
- Danny Alvarez – Florida State representative (2022–present)
- Tiffany Esposito – Florida State representative (2022–present)
- Fabián Basabe – Florida State representative (2022–present)
- Vicki Lopez – Florida State representative (2022–present)
- Alina Garcia – Florida State representative (2022–2024)
- Juan Carlos Porras – Florida State representative (2022–present)
- Susan Plasencia – Florida State representative (2022–present)
- Yvette Benarroch – Florida State representative (2024–present)
- Omar Blanco – Florida State representative (2024–present)

=== Georgia ===
- Reynaldo Martinez – Georgia State representative (2023–present)
- Jason Anavitarte – Georgia State senator (2021–present)
- Steven Sainz – Georgia State representative (2019–present)
- David Casas – Georgia State representative (2003–2019)

=== Hawaii ===
- Joseph R. Garcia, Jr. – Hawaii State representative (1959–1974)
- Diamond Garcia – Hawaii State representative (2023–present)

=== Illinois ===
- Frank Aguilar – Illinois State representative (2002–2004)
- John Cabello – Illinois State representative (2013–2021 and 2023–present)

=== Indiana ===
- Rebecca Kubacki – Indiana State representative (2010–2014)
- Cyndi Carrasco – Indiana State senator (2023–present)

=== Iowa ===
- Mark Costello – Iowa State representative (2012–present)
- Mark Cisneros – Iowa State representative (2021–present)

=== Kansas ===
- Ramon Gonzalez Jr. – Kansas State representative (2011–2017)
- Mario Goico – Kansas State representative (2003–2017)
- Carlos Mayans – mayor of Wichita, Kansas (2003–2007)

=== Kentucky ===
- Ralph Alvarado – Kentucky State senator (2015–2023)

=== Louisiana ===
- Blake Miguez – Louisiana State representative (2015–present)

=== Maryland ===
- Rachel Muñoz – Maryland State Delegate (2021–2025)
- Jesse Pippy – Maryland State Delegate (2019–present)
- Pedro del Valle – candidate for the Republication nomination for governor of Maryland (1954)

=== Massachusetts ===
- John F. Cruz – Massachusetts State representative (1990–1992)

=== Michigan ===
- Shane Hernandez – Michigan State representative (2017–2021)
- Daniela Garcia – Michigan State representative (2015–2019)

=== Minnesota ===
- Eric Lucero – Minnesota State representative (2015–present)
- Jon Koznick – Minnesota State representative (2015–present)

=== Mississippi ===
- Shane Aguirre – Mississippi State representative (2016–present)

=== Missouri ===
- Robert Cornejo – Missouri State representative (2013– 2018)

=== Nebraska ===
- Ray Aguilar – Member of the Nebraska Legislature (2021–present & 1999–2008)

=== Nevada ===
- Victoria Seaman – Nevada State Assemblywoman (2015–2017) & Las Vegas City Councillor (2019–present)

=== New Hampshire ===
- Marilinda Garcia – New Hampshire State representative (2006–2014) & U.S. House nominee (2014)
- Carlos Gonzalez – New Hampshire State representative (2010–2012 & 2014–2016)
- Bianca Garcia – New Hampshire State representative (2012–2014)
- Eric Estevez – New Hampshire State representative (2014–2016)
- Steve Negron – New Hampshire State representative (2016–2018) & U.S. House nominee (2018)
- Hershel Nunez – New Hampshire State representative (2019–present)
- Jose Cambrils – New Hampshire State representative (2021–present)
- Matthew Santonastaso – New Hampshire State representative (2021–present)
- Kristine Perez – New Hampshire State representative (2023–present)
- Arlene Quaratiello – New Hampshire State representative (2023–present)

=== New Jersey ===
- José F. Sosa – New Jersey Assemblyman (1992–1994)
- Eric Munoz – New Jersey Assemblyman (2001–2009)
- Maria Rodriguez-Gregg – New Jersey Assemblywoman (2014–2018)
- Christian Barranco – New Jersey Assemblywoman (2022–present)

=== New Mexico ===
- Larry Larrañaga – New Mexico State representative (1995–2018)
- Nora Espinoza – New Mexico State representative (2007–2017)
- Alonzo Baldonado – New Mexico State representative (2011–2022)
- David Chavez – New Mexico State representative (2011–2013)
- Kelly Fajardo – New Mexico State representative (2013–2023)
- David Gallegos – New Mexico State senator (2021–present) & New Mexico State representative (2013–2021)
- Paul Pacheco – New Mexico State representative (2013–2017)
- Vickie Perea – New Mexico State representative (2013–2015)
- Monica Youngblood – New Mexico State representative (2013–2019)
- Lisa Torraco – New Mexico State senator (2013–2017)
- Sarah Maestas Barnes – New Mexico State representative (2015–2019)
- Rod Montoya – New Mexico State representative (2015–present)
- Andy Nuñez – New Mexico State representative (2015–2017)
- Ted Barela – New Mexico State senator (2015–2017)
- Gregory Baca – New Mexico State senator (2017–present)
- Martin R. Zamora – New Mexico State representative (2019–present)
- Joshua Hernandez – New Mexico State representative (2021–present)
- Joshua A. Sanchez – New Mexico State senator (2021–present)
- Luis Terrazas – New Mexico State representative (2021–present)
- Brian Baca – New Mexico State representative (2022–present)
- Tanya Mirabal Moya – New Mexico State representative (2023–present)
- Alan Martinez – New Mexico State representative (2023–present)
- John Block – New Mexico State representative (2023–present)
- Nicole Chavez – New Mexico State representative (2025–present)
- Angelita Mejia – New Mexico State representative (2025–present)
- Elaine Sena Cortez – New Mexico State representative (2025–present)
- Gabriel Ramos – New Mexico State senator (2025–present)

=== New York ===
- Pete Lopez – New York State representative (2007–2017)
- Michael J. Garcia – United States Attorney for the Southern District of New York (2005–2008) and Associate judge of the New York Court of Appeals (2016–present)

=== North Carolina ===
- Marilyn Avila – North Carolina State representative (2007–2017)
- Brian Echevarria – North Carolina State representative (2025–present)

=== Ohio ===
- Rick Perales – Ohio State representative (2013–2021)
- George Lang – Ohio State senator (2021–present) & Ohio State representative (2017–2021)
- Alessandro Cutrona – Ohio State representative (2021–present)
- Brian Chavez – Ohio state senator (2023–present)

=== Oklahoma ===
- Jessica Garvin – Oklahoma state senator (2021–2024)
- Ryan Martinez – Oklahoma state representative (2016–2023)
- Charles Ortega – Oklahoma state representative (2008–2020)

=== Oregon ===
- Tracy Cramer – Oregon state representative (2023–2025)
- Sal Esquivel – Oregon state representative (2005–2019)
- Linda Flores – Oregon state representative (2003–2009)

=== Rhode Island ===
- Thomas Paolino – Rhode Island state senator (2017–present)
- Jessica de la Cruz – Rhode Island state senator (2019–present)

=== South Carolina ===
- Tom Fernandez – South Carolina state senator (2025–present)

=== Tennessee ===
- Dolores Gresham – Tennessee state senator (2008–2020)

=== Texas ===
- Jose Aliseda – Texas state representative (2011–2013)
- Victor G. Carrillo – Texas railroad commissioner (2002–2011)
- Mano DeAyala – Texas state representative (2023–present)
- Pete Flores – Texas state senator (2023–present & 2018–2021)
- John Frullo – Texas state representative (2011–2023)
- Rick Galindo – Texas state representative (2015–2017)
- Buddy Garcia – Texas railroad commissioner (2012–2012)
- Larry Gonzalez – Texas state representative (2011–2019)
- John Garza – Texas state representative (2011–2013)
- Ryan Guillen – Texas state representative (2003–present)
- Adam Hinojosa – Texas state senator (2025–present)
- Janie Lopez – Texas state representative (2023–present)
- J. M. Lozano – Texas state representative (2009–present)
- John Lujan – Texas state representative (2021–present & 2016–2017)
- Aaron Peña – Texas state representative (2003–2013)
- Gilbert Peña – Texas state representative (2015–2017)
- Orlando Sanchez – Harris county treasurer (2005–2019)
- Kronda Thimesch – Texas state representative (2023–2025)
- Raul Torres – Texas state representative (2011–2013)
- Jason Villalba – Texas state representative (2013–2019)
- Denise Villalobos – Texas state representative (2025–present)

=== Utah ===
- Timothy Adrian Jimenez – Utah state representative (2023–present)

=== Virginia ===
- Jeff Frederick – chairman of the Republican Party of Virginia (2010–2013) and Virginia state delegate (2004–2010)

=== Washington ===
- Gloria Mendoza – Washington state representative (2025–present)
- Nikki Torres – Washington state senator (2023–present)
- Alex Ybarra – Washington state representative (2019–present)

=== West Virginia ===
- Elias Coop-Gonzalez – West Virginia state delegate (2023–present)
- Paul Espinosa – West Virginia state delegate (2013–present)
- Patricia Rucker – West Virginia state senator (2017–present)

=== Wisconsin ===
- Rachael Cabral-Guevara – Wisconsin state assemblywoman (2021–2023) & Wisconsin state senator (2023–present)
- Jessie Rodriguez – Wisconsin state assemblywoman (2013–present)

=== Wyoming ===
- Rachel Rodriguez-Williams – Wyoming state representative (2021–present)
- John Romero-Martinez – Wyoming state representative (2021–2023)
- Tim Salazar – Wyoming state representative (2017–2021) & Wyoming state senator (2021–present)
- Tamara Trujillo – Wyoming state representative (2023–present)

== Judges ==
- Roger Benitez – judge of the United States District Court for the Southern District of California (2004–2017)
- Faustino J. Fernandez–Vina – justice of the New Jersey Supreme Court (2013–present)
- Eva Guzman – Texas Supreme Court justice (2009–2021)
- Dora Irizarry – judge of the United States District Court for the Eastern District of New York (2003–2020)
- Barbara Lagoa – judge of the United States Court of Appeals for the Eleventh Circuit (2019–present) & justice of the Supreme Court of Florida (2019)
- David M. Medina – Texas Supreme Court justice (2004–2012)
- Marilyn Milian – state circuit court judge and current judge on The People's Court
- Carlos G. Muñiz – justice of the Supreme Court of Florida (2019–present)
- Xavier Rodriguez – judge of the United States District Court for the Western District of Texas (2003–present) & Texas Supreme Court justice (2001–2003)

== Athletes and entertainers ==
- María Conchita Alonso – singer/actress
- Eddie Alvarez – mixed martial artist
- Tom Araya – vocalist and bassist of thrash metal band Slayer.
- Desi Arnaz – musician, band leader, actor, producer
- Matt Arroyo – mixed martial artist
- Rachel Campos-Duffy – actress
- Leo Carrillo – actor
- Verónica Castro – singer
- Luke Caudillo – mixed martial artist
- Henry Cejudo – mixed martial artist
- Manny Contreras – a founding member/lead guitarist of Impending Doom
- Mario Bautista - mixed martial artist
- Reuben Duran - mixed martial artist
- Joe Escalante - bassist and songwriter for the punk rock band The Vandals
- Erik Estrada – actor
- Oz Fox – lead guitarist of the Christian glam metal band Stryper
- Justin Gaethje – mixed martial artist
- Andy García – actor
- Ryan Garcia – professional boxer
- Steve Garcia – mixed martial artist
- Kelvin Gastelum – mixed martial artist
- Ricardo Lamas – mixed martial artist
- Lil Pump – rapper
- Jorge Masvidal – mixed martial artist
- Frank Mir – mixed martial artist
- Ricardo Montalbán – actor
- Tito Ortiz – mixed martial artist
- Freddie Prinze, Jr. – actor
- Dominick Reyes – mixed martial artist
- Jimmie Rivera – mixed martial artist
- Paul Rodriguez – actor
- Cesar Romero – actor (1907–1994)
- Yoel Romero – mixed martial artist
- Gabriel Rosado – former professional boxer
- Jeanette Dousdebes Rubio – former member, Miami Dolphins Cheerleaders
- Diego Sanchez – mixed martial artist
- Sonny Sandoval – musician, rapper, singer, and songwriter; co-founder and lead vocalist of nu metal band P.O.D.
- Jon Secada – singer
- Ricky Simón – mixed martial artist
- Michele Tafoya – former sportscaster
- Jaci Velasquez – singer
- Eduardo Verástegui – model, actor
- Joy Villa – singer, songwriter, actress of mixed Argentine and African American ancestry
- Raquel Welch – actress

== Law ==
- Lee Baca – 30th sheriff of Los Angeles County, California 1997–2014
- Miguel Estrada – attorney
- Michael J. Garcia – U.S. Attorney for the Southern District of New York
- Leander Perez – district attorney of Placquemines Parish, Louisiana 1924–1969, also served as district judge and chairman of Commission Council

== Science ==
- Luis Walter Alvarez – Nobel Prize winning physicist, inventor and professor
- Dr. Jose Celso Barbosa – physician, sociologist and political leader; first Puerto Rican to receive a medical degree in the United States; founder of the Puerto Rican Republican Party
- Dr. Tirso del Junco – diplomat of the American Board of Surgery and Fellow of the American College of Surgeons

== Columnists, authors and journalists ==
- Alex Castellanos – political media consultant
- Linda Chavez – political pundit, author
- Paul Crespo – conservative political commentator, consultant and activist
- Ben Domenech – writer, blogger, editor, publisher, TV commentator, co-founder of The Federalist and RedState
- Alberto Fernandez – has written for numerous publications
- Nick Fuentes – political commentator and live streamer
- GypsyCrusader (Paul Miller) – political commentator and live streamer former Muay Thai martial artist, of Romani and Mexican ancestry
- Jason Mattera – author of Obama Zombies: How the Liberal Machine Brainwashed My Generation
- Geraldo Rivera – author, attorney, political commentator, former talk show host, journalist
- Leslie Sanchez – political pundant

== Education and business ==
- Claudia Bermúdez – businesswoman and U.S. House candidate (2008)
- Ben Fernandez – financial consultant
- Jeff Giesea – businessman and organizer of alt–right and pro–Donald Trump activities; his mother is Mexican–American
- Armando Gutierrez – entrepreneur
- Robert Oscar Lopez – college professor, author
- Alfonso Martinez–Fonts Jr. – businessman, assistant secretary for the Private Sector of the Department of Homeland Security
- Jorge Mas – businessman, activist
- Roger Noriega – lobbyist and diplomat, Assistant Secretary of State for Western Hemisphere Affairs (2004-2005), U.S. ambassador to the Organization of American States (2001–2003)
- Felix Sabates – entrepreneur
- Moisés Silva – Cuban-born American biblical scholar and translator; past president of the Evangelical Theological Society (1997); ordained minister of the Orthodox Presbyterian Church for many years
- Andy Unanue – businessman
- Raul Danny Vargas – businessman, media commentator, political activist

== Activists ==
- Manuel Artime – anti-Castro activist, he raised money for the defense of the Watergate defendants.
- Bernard Barker – Cuban–American anti–Castro activist, worked for the Committee to Re–Elect the President and fundraiser for the Nixon campaign
- Carlos Bonilla – lobbyist and adviser to President George W. Bush, senior fellow at The Heritage Foundation
- Orlando Bosch – anti–Castro activist
- Al Cardenas – former chairman of the American Conservative Union
- Rafael Cruz – Protestant clergyman, active in campaigns of his son, U.S. senator Ted Cruz
- Pedro del Valle – retired lieutenant general, U.S. Marine Corps, founder of Defenders of the American Constitution
- Rafael Diaz-Balart – Cuban politician during the government of Fulgencio Batista, he formed an anti-Castro organization in 1959 and later moved to Spain and finally the US
- Miguel A. García Méndez – activist
- Virgilio Gonzalez – activist, Watergate burglar
- Marco Gutierrez – activist, co–founder of Latinos for Trump
- Eloy Gutierrez Menoyo – anti-Castro activist
- Juan Hernandez – co-founder of Hispanic Republicans of Texas
- Brandon Herrera – also known as "The AK Guy", YouTuber whose videos primarily focus on firearms
- Gaspar Jimenez – anti–Castro activist
- Eugenio R. Martinez – anti–Castro activist, Watergate burglar
- Jorge Mas Canosa – businessman, anti–Castro activist, founder of Cuban American National Foundation
- Mauro E. Mujica – Chilean American, chairman and CEO of U.S. English
- Luis Posada Carriles – anti–Castro activist
- Enrique Ros – anti–Castro activist
- Larry Rubin – Mexican American, president and chairman of The American Society of Mexico, and chairman of Republicans Abroad for Mexico
- Robby Starbuck – conservative activist and former music video director; ran in the 2022 United States House of Representatives elections in Tennessee
- Enrique Tarrio – Henry "Enrique" Tarrio, activist and chairman of the Proud Boys
- Tito the Builder – activist

== See also ==
- Hispanic and Latino Americans in politics
- Cuban exiles
- Latino vote
- Congressional Hispanic Conference
- List of Hispanic and Latino Republicans
- Republican National Hispanic Assembly
- Black conservatism in the United States
- Asian American and Pacific Islands American conservatism in the United States
- List of minority governors and lieutenant governors in the United States
- Conservative Democrat
- Conservative wave
