= Villalobos =

Villalobos may refer to:

- Villalobos, Spain, a municipality located in the province of Zamora, Spain
- Villalobos (surname), a Spanish surname
- Villalobos Expedition, a Spanish expedition to the East Indies in the 1540s
- Villalobos River, a river in Guatemala
- Villalobos Brothers, a Mexican band
- USS Villalobos (PG-42), a steel screw gunboat originally built for the Spanish Navy
- Vega de Villalobos, a municipality located in the province of Zamora, Spain
- Villalobos Rescue Center, a rescue center for pit bulls in Louisiana
