= Villalobos (surname) =

Origin
- Language: Spanish
- Meaning: "Town of Wolves"
- Region of origin: Castile and León, Spain

Other names
- Variant forms: Villallonga, Villali, Villalgordo, Villalba, Villalain, Villalbazo, Villalbos, Villalobas, Villalobo, Villaloboz, Villalohos, Villalabos, Villatoro, Villaire, Villa-Lobos, and Bialobos

Villalobos is a Spanish surname (meaning town of wolves) and common in Spain, Portugal, Latin America, and Italy

Villalobos is a city in the province of Zamora in Spain which derives its name from Spanish villa "town" and lobos "wolves". The element villa was used for someone who lived in a village, as opposed to an isolated farmhouse or in the town. The word was later used of a group of houses forming a settlement.

== Arts, music, and letters ==
- Carlos Villalobos (composer) (born 1975), American composer and musician
- Carmen Villalobos (born 1983), Colombian actress
- Gina Villalobos (born 1970), American singer-songwriter (daughter of Reynaldo, below)
- Heitor Villa-Lobos (1887–1959), Brazilian classical composer
- Horacio Villalobos (born 1970), Mexican TV host and actor
- Kyle Alessandro, full name Kyle Alessandro Helgesen Villalobos (born 2006), Norwegian singer
- Ligiah Villalobos (first credit 2000), Mexican-American film producer
- Lupe Vélez, full name Guadalupe Villalobos Vélez (1908–1944), Mexican film actress
- Osmariel Villalobos (born 1988), Venezuelan TV show host and Miss Earth Venezuela 2011
- Pepe Villalobos (1930–2026), Peruvian musician and composer
- Reynaldo Villalobos (born 1940), American cinematographer and director (father of Gina, above)
- Ricardo Villalobos (born 1970), Chilean-German DJ and music producer
- Yadhira Carrillo, full name Yadhira Carrillo Villalobos (born 1972), Mexican actress

== Athletes ==
- Alberth Villalobos (born 1995), Costa Rican footballer
- Benji Villalobos (born 1988), Salvadoran footballer
- Eli Villalobos (born 1997), American baseball player
- Enrique Villalobos (born 1965), Spanish basketball player
- Josh Villalobos (born 1985), Puerto Rican footballer
- Kenia Villalobos (born 1999), Mexican paratriathlete
- Manuel Villalobos (born 1980), Chilean footballer
- Pablo Villalobos (born 1979), Spanish long-distance runner
- Saúl Villalobos (born 1991), Mexican footballer

== Politics, law, and government ==
- Celia Villalobos (born 1949), Spanish politician
- Denise Villalobos, American politician
- J. Alex Villalobos (born 1963), American politician (grandson of Lolo, below)
- Joaquín Villalobos (born 1951), Salvadoran politician
- José Ángel Córdova Villalobos (born 1953), Mexican politician
- Josefina Villalobos (1924–2025), American-born Colombian-Ecuadorian public servant, First Lady of Ecuador (1992–1996)
- Juan Henríquez de Villalobos (1630–1689), Spanish soldier and governor of Chile
- Lolo Villalobos (1913–1997), Cuban politician (grandfather of J. Alex, above)
- Nervis Villalobos, Venezuelan politician
- Ruy López de Villalobos (1500–1544), Spanish explorer
- Sergio Villalobos (born 1930), Chilean historian

== Other ==
- Francisco López de Villalobos, (1474–1549), Spanish physician and author
- Francisco Raúl Villalobos Padilla (1921–2022), Mexican Roman Catholic bishop
- Maria Cristina Villalobos, American mathematician
- Román Arrieta Villalobos (1924–2004), Costa Rican Roman Catholic archbishop

== Fictional people ==
- Esmeralda Villalobos, fictional character in the film Pulp Fiction

== See also ==
- Villalobos (disambiguation)
