= Cantens =

Cantens is a surname. Notable people with the surname include:

- Gaston Cantens (born 1961), American politician
- Joey Cantens (born 1986), American basketball coach
