= Javier Fernandez (American politician) =

American politician

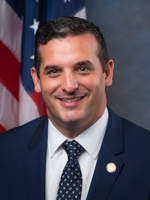

Member of the Florida House of Representatives from the 114th district
- In office May 1, 2018 – October 2, 2020
- Preceded by: Daisy Baez
- Succeeded by: Demi Busatta Cabrera

Mayor of South Miami, FL
- Incumbent
- Assumed office 2022
- Preceded by: Philip Stoddard

Personal details
- Born: June 25, 1975 (age 51) Miami, Florida, U.S.
- Party: Democratic
- Spouse: Anna Maria Patiño-Fernández
- Children: 2
- Education: Colby College (BA); University of Miami (JD)

Javier Fernandez is an American politician and attorney who served as a member of the Florida House of Representatives from 2018 to 2020, representing parts of Miami-Dade County around Coral Gables, West Miami, South Miami, Pinecrest, and Cutler Bay. Fernandez was first elected in a May 2018 special election to replace former representative Daisy Baez. Fernandez defeated Republican Andrew Vargas, 50.9 to 46.6%. Running for his first full term in November 2018, Fernandez beat Republican Javier Enriquez, 53 to 47%).

Fernandez is the Democratic nominee for Florida Senate District 39 in 2020. In October 2020, Fernandez resigned from his seat in the House to concentrate on his Senate campaign and to move into District 39. In the general election, Fernandez lost against Republican Ana Maria Rodriguez obtaining 42.8% to Rodriguez's 55.6%. In 2022, Fernandez returned to politics and was elected Mayor of South Miami.
