= Florida's 37th Senate district =

American legislative district

Florida's 37th State Senate district
Senator
Jason Pizzo; I–North Miami Beach

Florida's 37th Senate district elects one member to the Florida State Senate. It contains parts of Broward County and Miami-Dade County.

== Members ==
- Mario Díaz-Balart (November 3, 1992 – November 7, 2000)
- J. Alex Villalobos (January 3, 2001 – January 3, 2003)
- Burt Saunders (January 2003 – January 2009)
- Garrett Richter (November 4, 2008 – November 8, 2016)
- Jason Pizzo (since 2018)
