= Daisy Baez =

Dominican-American politician (born 1959)

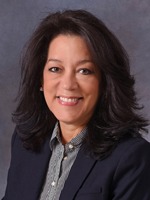

Member of the Florida House of Representatives from the 114th district
- In office November 8, 2016 – November 1, 2017
- Preceded by: Erik Fresen
- Succeeded by: Javier Fernandez

Personal details
- Born: August 7, 1959 (age 67) Dominican Republic
- Party: Democratic
- Children: 1
- Education: American Technological University (BS); Sam Houston State University (MA)
- Occupation: Health care consultant
- Website: Campaign website

Military service
- Allegiance: United States
- Branch/service: United States Army
- Years of service: 1980-1983
- Rank: Specialist
- Awards: Army Commendation Medal; Army Achievement Medal

Daisy Josefina Baez (born August 7, 1959) is a Democratic politician from Florida. She served as a member of the Florida House of Representatives from 2016 until her resignation in 2017. She represented the 114th district, stretching from western Miami to Cutler Bay in Miami-Dade County.

== Early life and career ==
Baez was born in the Dominican Republic and raised there by her grandmother after her parents divorced and her mother moved to New York City to support her family. Baez immigrated to the United States at the age of 17. She joined the U.S. Army in 1980, and served for three years as a Preventive Medicine Specialist in the 1st Cavalry Division Surgeon's Office in Fort Hood, Texas.

After an honorable discharge, Baez received a bachelor's degree in social work at American Technological University, and later a master's degree in education counseling from Sam Houston State University.

After over 15 years working in hospital management and health care consulting, in 2011 she founded the Dominican Health Care Association of Florida. The group is a nonprofit organization with the mission of advocating for and supporting healthcare services by and for the Dominican community in Florida. She is currently the association's executive director.

Baez has one daughter, whom she raised as a single parent.

== Florida House of Representatives ==
In 2014, Baez ran for the Florida House of Representatives in the 114th district, based around Coral Gables, South Miami, Cutler Bay, and western Miami. She was defeated in the general election by the incumbent, Republican Erik Fresen, 52.7 to 44.0%.

Two years later, when Fresen was term-limited, Baez ran again for the 114th district. Her campaign focused on supporting affordable healthcare, equal pay, and public education, including the Bright Futures Scholarship Program. She was elected in the 2016 general election, defeating Republican John Couriel, 51 to 49%.

In the House of Representatives, Baez was a member of the Health & Human Services Committee.

Baez resigned from the House on November 1, 2017, as part of an agreement to plead guilty to a misdemeanor perjury charge. The charge originated in an investigation over whether she was a legal resident of her House district.
