= J. Dudley Goodlette =

American politician

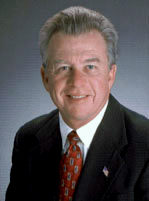

Member of the Florida House of Representatives from the 76th district
- In office January 1999 – January 2007
- Preceded by: Burt Saunders
- Succeeded by: Garrett Richter

Personal details
- Born: May 18, 1948 (age 78) Hazard, Kentucky, U.S.
- Party: Republican
- Spouse: Barbara J. Hamilton
- Education: West Point Military Academy; Eastern Kentucky University (BS); University of Florida (JD)
- Profession: Attorney

J. Dudley Goodlette (born May 18, 1948, in Hazard, Kentucky) is an American attorney and politician who served as a Representative in the Florida House of Representatives from 1999 to 2007. Following his departure from the Florida House of Representatives, Goodlette. served as the interim president of Edison Community College (now Edison State College) from 2011 to 2012, and serves as Chairman of the Naples Ethics Commission. In 2019, Goodlette was appointed as Special master to hear and provide a recommendation on the proprietary of Governor Ron DeSantis's suspension of Broward County Sheriff Scott Israel. Goodlette found the suspension improper and recommended reinstatement, but his recommendation was rejected by the Florida Senate.

== Biography ==
Goodlette moved to Naples, Florida, with his family in 1954.

Goodlette served in the West Point Military Academy, and received his bachelor's degree from Eastern Kentucky University in 1970, and his Juris Doctor from the University of Florida in 1972. He was in the U.S. Army in Military Intelligence from 1970 to 1985, where he was a captain.

Goodlette served as a Representative in the House of Representatives of the U.S. State of Florida from 1998 to 2007. As a member of the House of Representatives, he was Chairman of the Rules and Calendar Council, and Chairman of the Policy Council.

He was the interim president of Edison Community College (now Edison State College) from 2011 to 2012. Goodlette serves as Chairman of the Naples Ethics Commission. He is a lawyer with the law firm of Henderson, Franklin, Starnes & Holt.

After Florida Governor Ron DeSantis suspended Broward County Sheriff Scott Israel in 2019, Israel appealed his removal to the Florida Senate, which in turn appointed Goodlette to serve as special master to hear the testimony and evidence. After conducting a trial, Goodlette issued his 34-page report in September 2019, finding the removal was improper and recommending that Israel be reinstated. Despite his report and recommendation, however, the Florida Senate held a special session on October 23, 2019, and voted 25–15 to uphold the suspension.
