= Mary Ann Perez =

Texas politician

Member of the Texas House of Representatives from the 144th district
- Incumbent
- Assumed office January 10, 2017
- Preceded by: Gilbert Peña
- In office January 8, 2013 – January 13, 2015
- Preceded by: Barbara Legler
- Succeeded by: Gilbert Peña

Personal details
- Born: May 15, 1962 (age 64)
- Party: Democratic
- Children: 2
- Education: University of Houston–Downtown
- Occupation: Insurance agent
- Website: votemaryannperez.com

Maryann Garza Perez (born May 15, 1962) is a Democratic member of the Texas House of Representatives for House District 144 in Harris County, Texas. Perez previously served one term from 2013 to 2015. An insurance agent, she is a former member of the trustees of Houston Community College.

== Business career ==
Perez owns an insurance agency located in Southeast Harris County, Texas.

== Electoral history ==
Perez won the District 144 House seat in 2012 over Republican David Pineda. She received 12,446 votes (52.1 percent) to his 10,885 (45.5 percent). The remaining 2.4 percent was held by the Libertarian Party nominee, Robb Rourke.

Perez was narrowly unseated after one term in the November 4, 2014 general election by Republican Gilbert Peña of Houston. He polled 6,015 votes (50.6 percent) to her 5,863 (49.4 percent).

Perez faced Peña again in the 2016 general election, when she outpolled her opponent, 16,258 votes (60.2 percent) to 10,736 (39.8 percent). Perez was sworn in for her second term January 10, 2017. In the 85th Legislative Session, Perez serves on the Appropriations Committee and the Special Purpose Districts Committee, of which she is Vice Chair.

Perez won reelection in the general election held on November 6, 2018. With 14,324 votes (61.2 percent), she defeated her Republican challenger, Ruben Villarreal, who polled 9,088 (38.8 percent).

== Personal life ==
Perez has two sons.

Texas House of Representatives
Preceded by Barbara Legler	Texas State Representative for District 144 (Harris County); 2013–2015	Succeeded by Gilbert Peña
Preceded by Gilbert Peña	Texas State Representative for District 144 (Harris County); 2017–	Succeeded by Incumbent
