= Raul Turrieta =

American politician

Member-elect of the New Mexico House of Representatives from the 39th district
- Assuming office January 2027
- Succeeding: Luis Terrazas

Personal details
- Party: Democratic

Raul Turrieta is an American politician. A member of the Democratic Party, he is the member-elect for the 39th district of the New Mexico House of Representatives.
