= Demi Busatta =

American politician (born 1990)

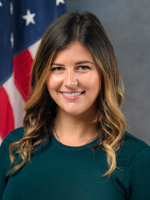

Member of the Florida House of Representatives from the 114th district
- Incumbent
- Assumed office November 3, 2020
- Preceded by: Javier Fernandez

Personal details
- Born: Demi Busatta; November 4, 1990 (age 35) Cape Coral, Florida, U.S.
- Party: Republican
- Education: Florida State University (BS)

Demi Busatta (born November 4, 1990) is an American politician serving as a member of the Florida House of Representatives from the 114th district. She assumed office on November 3, 2020.

== Early life and education ==
Busatta was born in Cape Coral, Florida. She earned a Bachelor of Science degree from Florida State University. She studied under Superintendent Kurt Browning, current head of the Pasco County School District.

== Career ==
Prior to entering politics, Busatta worked as a nonprofit development director. She later served as the chief of staff for State Senator Anitere Flores and worked in the office of the Florida Senate Sergeant-at-Arms. Busatta Cabrera was elected to the Florida House of Representatives and assumed office on November 3, 2020. During her tenure in the House, Busatta has sponsored legislation to mitigate sea level rise in oceanfront communities.
