= Florida's 114th House of Representatives district =

Florida district

Florida's 114th State House of Representatives district
Representative
| Demi Busatta; R–Coral Gables |

Florida's 114th House of Representatives district elects one member of the Florida House of Representatives. It contains parts of Miami-Dade County.

== Members ==
- Bruce J. Hoffman (until 1992)
- Miguel De Grandy (1992–1994)
- Jorge Rodriguez-Chomat (1994–1998)
- Gaston Cantens (1998–2004)
- Anitere Flores (2004–2010)
- Ana Rivas Logan (2010–2012)
- Erik Fresen (2012–2016)
- Daisy Baez (2016–2017)
- Javier Fernandez (2018–2020)
- Demi Busatta (since 2020)
