= Burt Saunders =

American politician

Burt L. Saunders
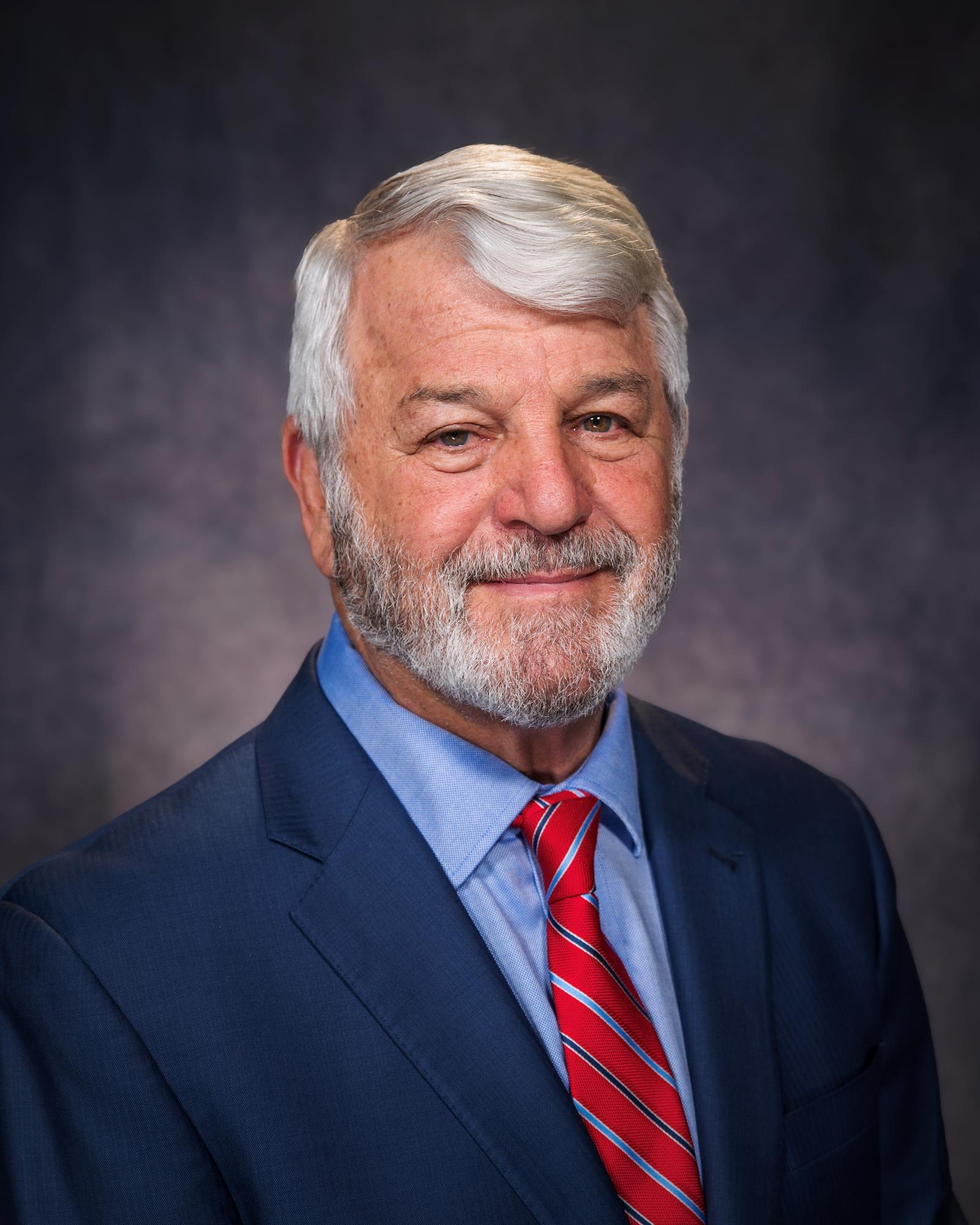
- Official portrait

Member of the Collier County Commission from the 3rd district
- Incumbent
- Assumed office November 15, 2016
- Preceded by: Tom Henning

Member of the Florida Senate
- In office November 3, 1998 – November 4, 2008
- Preceded by: Fred Dudley
- Succeeded by: Garrett Richter
- Constituency: 25th district (1998–2002); 37th district (2002–2008)

Member of the Florida House of Representatives from the 76th district
- In office November 8, 1994 – November 3, 1998
- Preceded by: Mary Ellen Hawkins
- Succeeded by: J. Dudley Goodlette

Personal details
- Born: November 7, 1948 (age 77) Hampton, Virginia, U.S.
- Party: Republican
- Spouse: Lillian Love
- Children: 3
- Education: University of South Florida (BA); College of William and Mary (JD); University of Miami (LLM)
- Profession: attorney

Burt L. Saunders (born November 7, 1948) is a Republican Party politician from Florida who has served as a member of the Lee County Commission from 2016 to the present. He previously served in the Florida Senate from 1998 to 2008, and in the Florida House of Representatives from 1994 to 1998.

In 2008 Saunders ran for the United States House of Representatives in Florida's 14th congressional district with no party affiliation. He lost, finishing third in the four-way general election, receiving 14.7% of the vote. However, Saunders was one of the top 5 candidates to run for the United States House without any political party in 2008. Saunders was elected to the Collier County Commission in 2016. He previously served on the Collier County Commission from 1986 to 1994.

Florida House of Representatives
Preceded by Mary Ellen Hawkins	Member of the Florida House of Representatives from the 76th district 1994–1998	Succeeded by J. Dudley Goodlette
Florida Senate
Preceded by Fred Dudley	Member of the Florida Senate from the 25th district 2000–2002	Succeeded by Jeff Atwater
Preceded by J. Alex Villalobos	Member of the Florida Senate from the 37th district 2002–2008	Succeeded by Garrett Richter
