= Ron Silver (politician) =

American politician

Ronald Silver
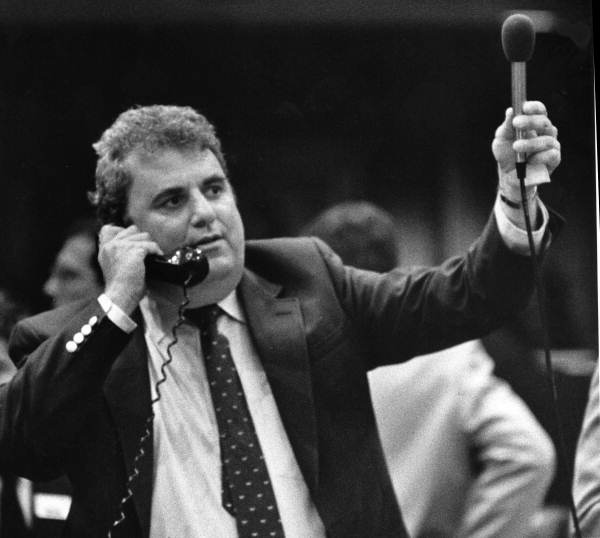
- Silver in 1987

Member of the Florida Senate from the 38th district
- In office November 3, 1992 – November 5, 2002
- Preceded by: Fred Dudley
- Succeeded by: J. Alex Villalobos

Member of the Florida House of Representatives from the 100th district
- In office November 2, 1982 – November 3, 1992
- Preceded by: Virginia Rosen
- Succeeded by: Fred Lippman

Member of the Florida House of Representatives from the 103rd district
- In office November 7, 1978 – November 2, 1982
- Preceded by: Alan S. Becker
- Succeeded by: Michael Friedman

Personal details
- Born: June 25, 1943 (age 83) Cambridge, Massachusetts, U.S.
- Party: Democratic
- Spouse: Irene Huth
- Children: 2

Ronald A. Silver (born June 25, 1943) is an American former politician in the state of Florida.

He served in the Florida House of Representatives for the 100th district from 1982 to 1992, as a Democrat. He also served in the Florida State Senate from 1992 to 2002. On October 15, 2019, in Hicksville, NY, Canbiola, Inc. (OTCQB: CANB), a developer, manufacturer and seller of a variety of hemp-derived THC-Free Cannabidiol (CBD) Isolate products such as oils, drops/tinctures, creams, moisturizers, chews, and capsules announced the appointments of Senator Ron Silver, James Murphy and Alger Boyer Jr. to its board of directors.
