= Luis Terrazas (New Mexico politician) =

American politician and businessman

Member of the New Mexico House of Representatives from the 39th district
- Incumbent
- Assumed office January 19, 2021
- Preceded by: Rodolpho Martinez
- Succeeded by: Raul Turrieta (elect)

Personal details
- Party: Republican

Luis Terrazas is an American politician and businessman serving as a member of the New Mexico House of Representatives from the 39th district. He assumed office on January 19, 2021.

== Background ==
Terrazas is a native of Grant County, New Mexico. He has founded several businesses in Silver City, Deming and Las Cruces, New Mexico, including Silver City Auto Spa, Terrazas Granite and Marble, Terrazas Funeral Chapels, and Terrazas Crematory. He was elected to the New Mexico House of Representatives in 2020, defeating Democratic incumbent Rodolpho Martinez. He assumed office on January 19, 2021.
