= Miguel De Grandy =

Cuban-American lawyer and politician

Member of the Florida House of Representatives from the 110th district
- In office 1989 – November 3, 1992
- Preceded by: Lincoln Díaz-Balart
- Succeeded by: Rudy García

Member of the Florida House of Representatives from the 114th district
- In office 1992–1994
- Preceded by: Bruce J. Hoffman
- Succeeded by: Jorge Rodriguez-Chomat

Personal details
- Born: December 3, 1958 (age 67) Havana, Cuba
- Party: Republican
- Spouse: Lisa De Grandy
- Education: University of Florida
- Occupation: Lawyer

Miguel De Grandy (born December 3, 1958) is a Cuban-American lawyer and politician. He served as a Republican member for the 110th and 114th district of the Florida House of Representatives.

De Grandy was born in Havana. He attended the University of Florida, where he earned a bachelor's degree and a Juris Doctor degree at the age of 22, being the youngest graduate in his graduating class. He started his legal career as an Assistant State Attorney. He worked as a lawyer in Coral Gables, Florida. In 1989, De Grandy was elected for the 110th district of the Florida House of Representatives, serving until 1992. he was then representative for the 114th district from 1992 to 1994. During his tenure in the Florida House of representatives De Grandy was ranked in the top 10 percent of Florida legislators and the top Republican member from 1990 to 1994 by the Miami Herald.

Miguel De Grandy is a partner in the law firm of Holland & Knight. Prior to that he was a shareholder in the law firm of Greenberg Traurig where he was the head of the Governmental Law practice group of the Miami office.
