= Ana Rivas Logan =

American politician

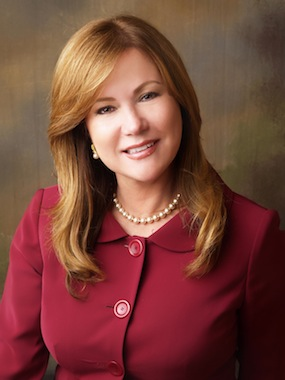

Member of the Florida House of Representatives from the 114th district
- In office November 2, 2010 – November 6, 2012
- Preceded by: Anitere Flores
- Succeeded by: Erik Fresen

Member of the Miami-Dade County Public Schools Board from the 7th district
- In office 2004–2010
- Preceded by: Frank Cobo
- Succeeded by: Carlos Curbelo

Personal details
- Born: May 16, 1961 (age 65) Nicaragua
- Party: Republican (before 2014); Democratic (2014–present)
- Profession: Educator

Ana Rivas Logan (born May 16, 1961) is a politician from the state of Florida. She served one term in the Florida House of Representatives, representing parts of Miami-Dade County as a Republican. After decennial redistricting drew her into the same Kendall-based district as fellow Representative José Félix Díaz, Rivas Logan lost the 2012 primary election to Díaz. Before serving in the Florida House, Rivas Logan was a member of the Miami-Dade County School Board from 2004 to 2010. She represented the 7th district.

She earned her bachelor's degree in computer science from Florida International University and a master's degree in the same discipline from Nova Southeastern University.

In February 2014, she announced she was leaving the Republican Party and becoming a Democrat, citing Republicans' growing hostility to immigrants and women's issues.

In 2016, she declared as a candidate for the Florida Senate in the 40th district, but later withdrew from the race to care for her parents. In May 2017, she announced she was running again for the 40th district, in a special election to replace resigned Senator Frank Artiles. She lost the Democratic primary to Annette Taddeo, 71 to 29%.
