= Tim Jimenez =

American politician

Member of the Utah House of Representatives from the 28th district
- In office January 1, 2023 – December 31, 2024
- Succeeded by: Nicholeen P. Peck

Personal details
- Party: Republican
- Education: University of Idaho (BS)
- Occupation: Environmental engineer

Tim Jimenez is an American politician. He served as a Republican member for the 28th district of the Utah House of Representatives.
