= Gilbert Peña =

American politician

Gilbert H. Peña

Member of the Texas House of Representatives from the 144th district
- In office January 13, 2015 – January 8, 2017
- Preceded by: Mary Ann Perez
- Succeeded by: Mary Ann Perez

Personal details
- Born: May 27, 1949 (age 77) Galveston, Texas, USA
- Party: Republican
- Spouse: Cynthia Hernandez Peña
- Children: Four children
- Education: Texas Southern University
- Occupation: Retired

Gilbert H. Peña (born 1949) was a Republican member of the Texas House of Representatives from District 144 in Harris County, Texas.

== Political life ==
Political offices
Texas House of Representatives
| Preceded by Mary Ann Perez | Texas State Representative from District 144 (Harris County); 2015–2017 | Succeeded by Mary Ann Perez |
