= Lolo Villalobos =

Cuban politician (1913–1997)

Jose D. "Lolo" Villalobos y Olivera (27 August 1913 in Jaruco, Cuba – 14 January 1997 in Miami, Florida, US) was a Cuban politician.

== Early life ==
Villalobos was born in San Antonio de Rio Blanco del Norte. He was the son of Plutarco Villalobos y Marquez and Amelia Olivera y Gutierrez. His father was the nation's treasurer. In 1930, he graduated from the Instituto de Segunda Ensenza de la Habana.

== Career ==
At the age of 20 in 1933, while attending the University of Havana Medical School, he became the chief of the Havana Aqueduct. In 1940, at the age of 27, Villalobos was elected as Mayor of the city of Guanabacoa and was re-elected six consecutive times. In January 1959, after Fidel Castro took control of Cuba, he sought asylum in the Embassy of Brazil and on May 9, 1959, he went into exile in Miami.

== Exile ==
While in exile, Villalobos served as Assistant to the City of Miami Mayor, Maurice Ferre. He also worked as an assistant to Metro-Dade Commissioner Bruce Kaplan.

== Personal life ==
Villalobos had two children, Jose A. and Miguel, with his first wife Araminta Albuquerque. He married Yolanda Duque de Estrada and they had two sons; Carlos Jose, and Alex Juan. His grandson is J. Alex Villalobos, a member of the Florida Senate. Villalobos died in his Miami, Florida home at the age of 83 after suffering a heart attack.
