= Vega de Villalobos =

Coordinates: 41°58′N 5°28′W

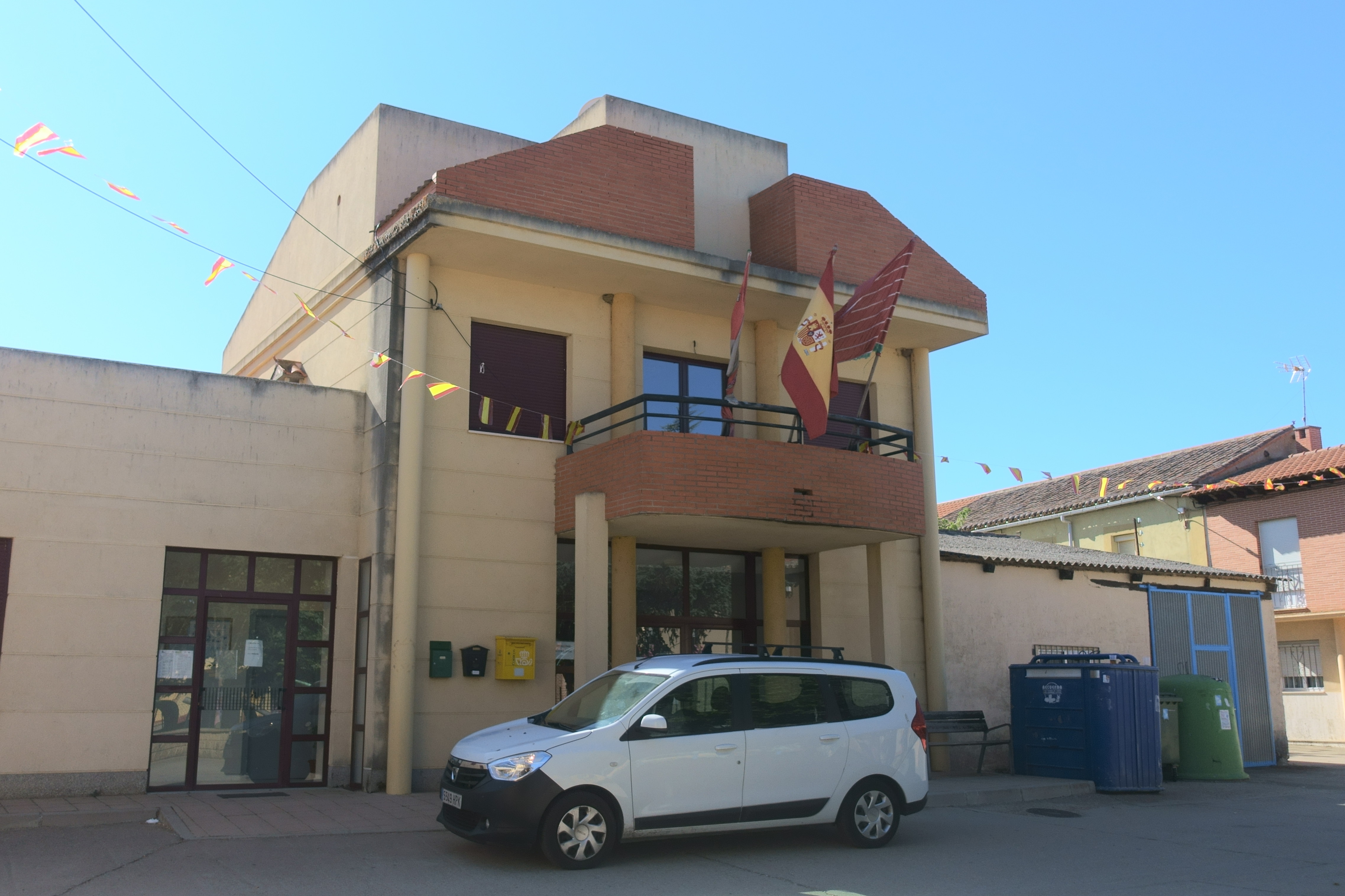
- Interactive map of Vega de Villalobos
- Country: Spain
- Autonomous community: Castile and León
- Province: Zamora
- Municipality: Vega de Villalobos

Area
  - Total: 10 km^{2} (3.9 sq mi)

Population (2025-01-01)
  - Total: 88
  - Density: 8.8/km^{2} (23/sq mi)
- Time zone: UTC+1 (CET)
  - Summer (DST): UTC+2 (CEST)

Vega de Villalobos is a municipality located in the province of Zamora, Castile and León, Spain. According to the 2004 census (INE), the municipality has a population of 152 inhabitants.
