= Jorge Rodriguez-Chomat =

American politician (1945–2017)

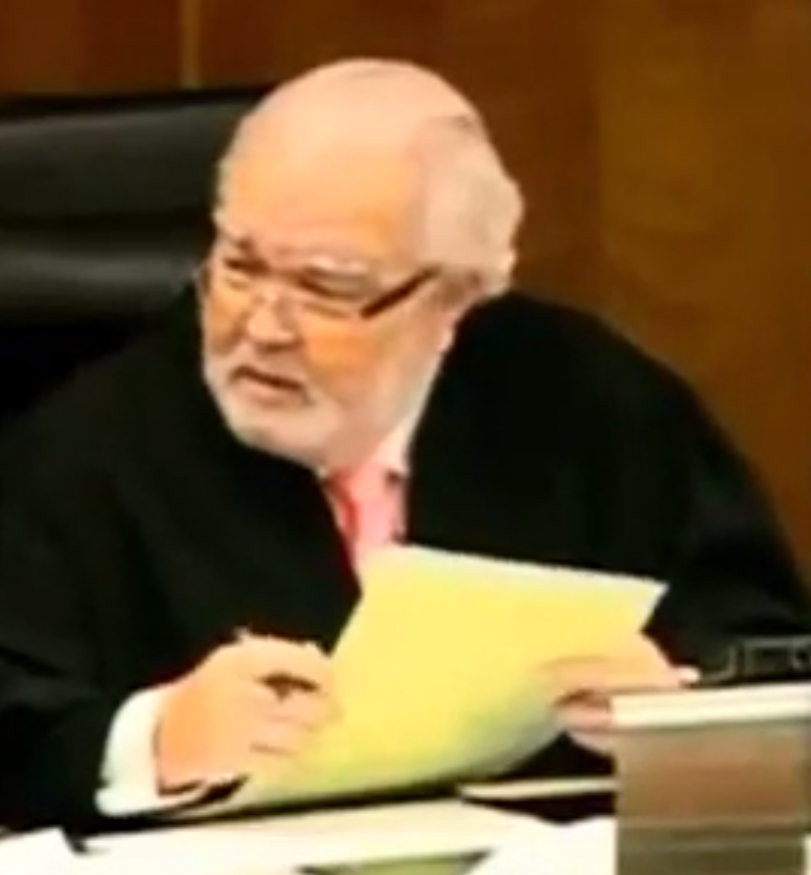
- Rodriguez-Chomat in 2013

Judge of the Eleventh Judicial Circuit Court of Florida
- In office 2011 – January 2, 2017
- Preceded by: William Johnson

Member of the Florida House of Representatives from the 114th district
- In office 1994–1998
- Preceded by: Miguel De Grandy
- Succeeded by: Gaston Cantens

Personal details
- Born: June 28, 1945 Havana, Cuba
- Died: August 19, 2017 (aged 72) Miami, Florida, U.S.
- Cause of death: Prostate cancer
- Party: Republican
- Education: St. Thomas University

Military service
- Allegiance: United States
- Unit: U.S. Army Reserve

Jorge Rodriguez-Chomat (June 28, 1945 – August 19, 2017) was a Cuban-American politician and judge. He was a one-term member of the Florida House of Representatives representing a district in West Miami for the Republican Party from 1994 until his defeat in 1998. He served as a Judge of the Criminal and Family Divisions of the Eleventh Judicial Circuit Court of Florida from 2011 until his retirement in 2017.

== Early life and education ==
Rodriguez-Chomat was born in Havana and was active in the Cuban-American lobby. He attended high school briefly but dropped out. He was educated at St. Thomas University and served in the U.S. Army Reserve. Rodriguez-Chomat went on to work as an accountant, an IRS agent and a tax lawyer before winning office as a lawmaker and later serving as a judge.

== Career ==
In 2013, Rodriguez-Chomat was the subject of a viral video after a teenage girl arrested on drugs charges told Rodriguez-Chomat "adiós" as she walked off. He responded by calling her back and doubling her bond amount, to her disbelief, after which he bade her "adiós". After the girl, Penelope Soto, responded by saying "Fuck you", and gave him the middle finger, he sentenced her to 30 days in the county jail for criminal contempt of court. After she apologized at a hearing four days later, he withdrew the contempt citations and urged her to seek drug counselling.

== Death ==
Rodriguez-Chomat died on August 19, 2017, after a long battle with prostate cancer at age 72. He was survived by his wife, Susanita Ferro Rodriguez-Chomat and his children and stepchildren.
