= Villalobos, Spain =

Coordinates: 41°57′N 5°28′W

Villalobos
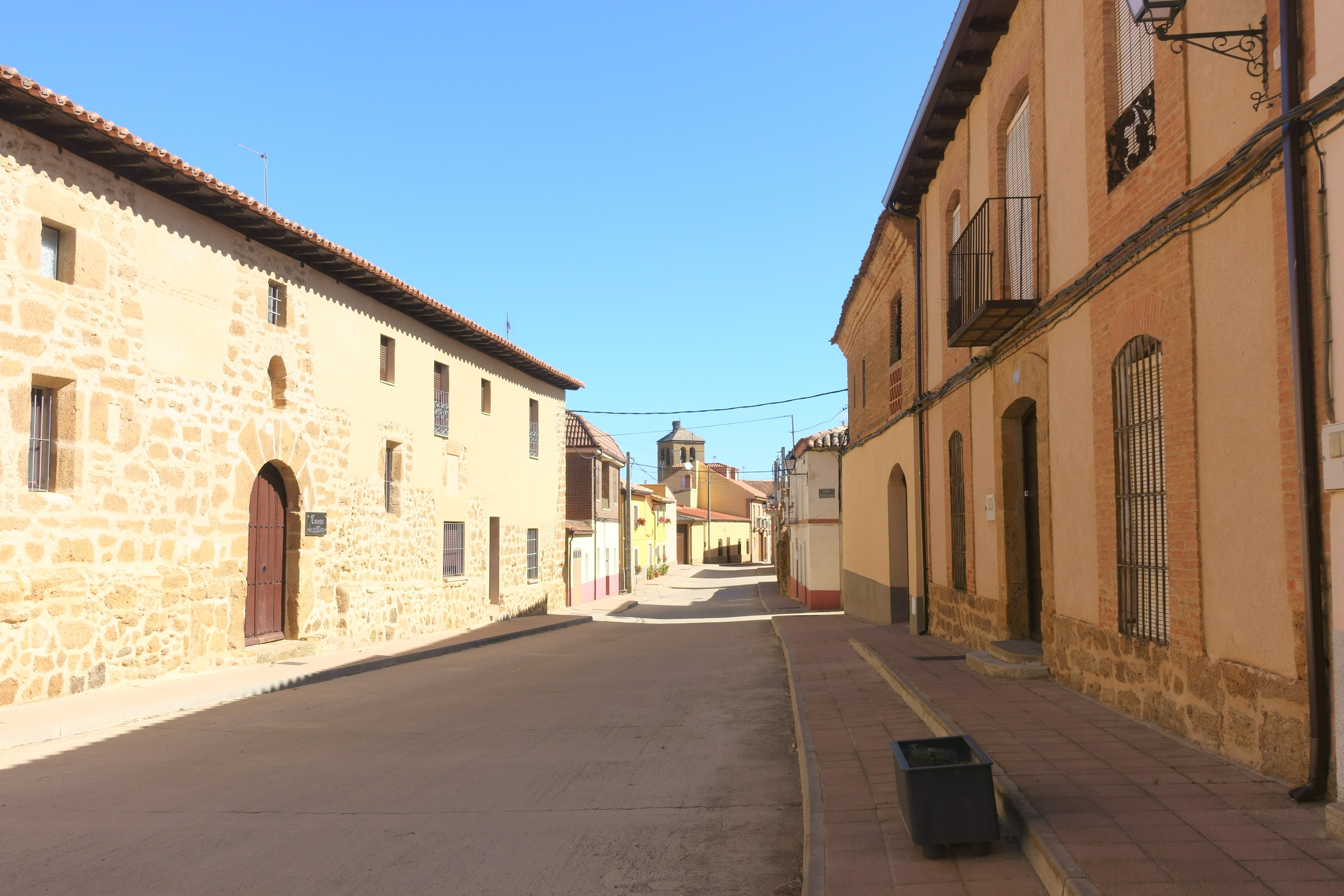

- Flag Coat of arms
- Interactive map of Villalobos
- Country: Spain
- Autonomous community: Castile and León
- Province: Zamora
- Municipality: Villalobos

Area
  - Total: 43 km^{2} (17 sq mi)

Population (2025-01-01)
  - Total: 200
  - Density: 4.7/km^{2} (12/sq mi)
- Time zone: UTC+1 (CET)
  - Summer (DST): UTC+2 (CEST)

Villalobos is a municipality located in the province of Zamora, Castile and León, Spain.

According to the 2004 census (INE), the municipality has a population of 295 inhabitants.

The name literally means "City of Wolves" or "Village of the Wolves".

== Other connections ==
The surname Villalobos originates from this town.
