= Erik Fresen =

American politician

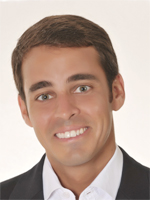

Member of the Florida House of Representatives from the 114th district
- In office November 20, 2012 – November 20, 2016
- Preceded by: Ana Rivas Logan
- Succeeded by: Daisy Baez

Member of the Florida House of Representatives from the 111th district
- In office November 18, 2008 – November 20, 2012
- Preceded by: Marco Rubio
- Succeeded by: Eduardo González

Personal details
- Born: June 9, 1976 (age 50) Miami, Florida
- Party: Republican
- Spouse: Ethel Fresen
- Children: 3
- Education: Florida State University (B.S.)
- Profession: Land use consultant

Erik Fresen (born June 9, 1976) is a former Republican member of the Florida House of Representatives, representing the 114th District, which stretches from West Miami to Cutler Bay in northeastern Miami-Dade County, from 2012 to 2016. He previously represented the 111th District from 2008 to 2012.

In 2017, he pled guilty to tax evasion in 2011 and was sentenced to 60 days in jail.

== History ==
Fresen was born in Miami and attended Florida State University, receiving a degree in finance and international affairs. Following graduation, he worked as a legislative aide from 2000 to 2002, and then worked as a land use consultant for Holland & Knight from 2005 to 2008, and then for Civica from 2008 to the present.

== Florida House of Representatives ==
Erik Fresen was recommended by The Miami Herald for State Representative District 114 on October 11, 2014. In 2008, when State Representative Marco Rubio, the Speaker of the Florida House of Representatives and the future United States Senator, was unable to seek re-election due to term limits, Fresen ran to succeed him in the 111th District, which stretched from Hialeah to South Miami in eastern Miami-Dade County. Fresen faced Rafael Luiz Perez, a former aide to Rubio, in the Republican primary, whom he was narrowly able to beat, winning with 52% of the vote to Perez's 48%. Advancing to the general election, he faced Frank Morra, the Democratic nominee, whom he was able to easily dispatch, winning his first term in the legislature with 59% of the vote. Running for re-election in 2010, Fresen ran unopposed before facing Democratic nominee Cristina Albright, whom he defeated with 64% of the vote.

When the state's legislative districts were redrawn in 2012, Fresen opted to run for re-election in the 114th District, which contained most of the territory that he previously represented in Miami-Dade County. He was opposed in the Republican primary by Amory Bodin, who criticized Fresen for voting for what Bodin referred to as "tax increases, pork barrel spending, and budgets with enormous hidden deficits," and called attention to Fresen's alleged financial irregularities. Regardless, Bodin did not pose a serious challenge to Fresen's campaign, and Fresen easily won the primary, receiving 72% of the vote to his opponent's 28%. In the general election, he was opposed by Ross Hancock, the Democratic nominee, and a contentious election ensued. Ultimately, Fresen narrowly won re-election over Hancock, defeating his opponent by just 1,403 votes and with 51% of the vote.

In 2013, Fresen was named “legislator of the year” by Florida’s for-profit college lobbying group, the Florida Association of Postsecondary Schools & Colleges. Fresen has received at least $25,500 from the “career college” industry, made up mostly of for-profit schools.

== Controversy ==
A conflict of interest ethics complaint was filed against him in 2011 for voting on a proposal that would give benefits to some charter schools, and in the 2016 legislative session he fast-tracked a bill to force Florida public school districts to share their construction tax money with charters.

On December 5, 2012, the Florida Ethics Commission announced that it had found "probable cause" that Fresen "failed to properly disclose his annual net worth, assets, and liabilities from 2008 to 2011," which Fresen called "baseless and pointless" and a "textbook political attack." He also faced a lawsuit filed against him by a mortgage company after he did not make payments on his house, a $29,199 lien from the Internal Revenue Service for taxes owed, and a $10,000 lien from the Miami-Dade Building Department for a code enforcement violation."

Fresen reached an agreement with Diane Guillemette, the state advocate, wherein he "conceded that there were minor mistakes on the disclosure forms he filed between 2008 and 2011," but the agreement was rejected by the Ethics Commission because Fresen had not paid a $1,500 ethics fine from when he had not filed a financial disclosure form as a legislative aide. Commissioner Linda Robison suggested that a "public censure" might be needed and announced, "I find this appalling and I think his constituents need to know he never paid a fine that was assessed."

On September 29, 2017, the Miami Herald reported that Fresen would serve 60 days in jail and a year of probation for failing to file a 2011 tax return. Although he was only charged for the missing 2011 return, he didn't properly report his income to the IRS from 2007 - 2016, a period that included his years in the Florida House. He has since repaid all the money owed.
