= Anitere Flores =

American politician (born 1976)

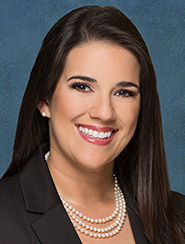
- Official portrait, 2002

President pro tempore of the Florida Senate
- In office November 22, 2016 – November 20, 2018
- Preceded by: Garrett Richter
- Succeeded by: David Simmons

Member of the Florida Senate
- In office November 2, 2010 – November 3, 2020
- Preceded by: J. Alex Villalobos
- Succeeded by: Ana Maria Rodriguez
- Constituency: 38th district (2010–2012); 37th district (2012–2016); 39th district (2016–2020)

Member of the Florida House of Representatives from the 114th district
- In office November 2, 2004 – November 2, 2010
- Preceded by: Gaston Cantens
- Succeeded by: Ana Rivas Logan

Personal details
- Born: September 8, 1976 (age 50) Miami, Florida, U.S.
- Party: Republican
- Education: Florida International University (BA); University of Florida (JD)

Anitere Flores (born September 8, 1976) is a Republican politician from Miami, Florida. She served three terms in the Florida House of Representatives from 2004 to 2010. Subsequently, she served in the Florida Senate from 2010 to 2020. In the 2016–18 legislative session, Flores served as president pro tempore of the Senate.

== History ==
Flores was born in Miami, and attended Florida International University, graduating with her bachelor's degree in 1997. She then attended the Fredric G. Levin College of Law at the University of Florida, receiving her Juris Doctor in 2001. After graduation, she worked for the Florida House of Representatives on the Education Policy Council, for then-Governor Jeb Bush as his Education Policy Chief, and as Director of State Relations for Florida International University.

== Florida House of Representatives ==
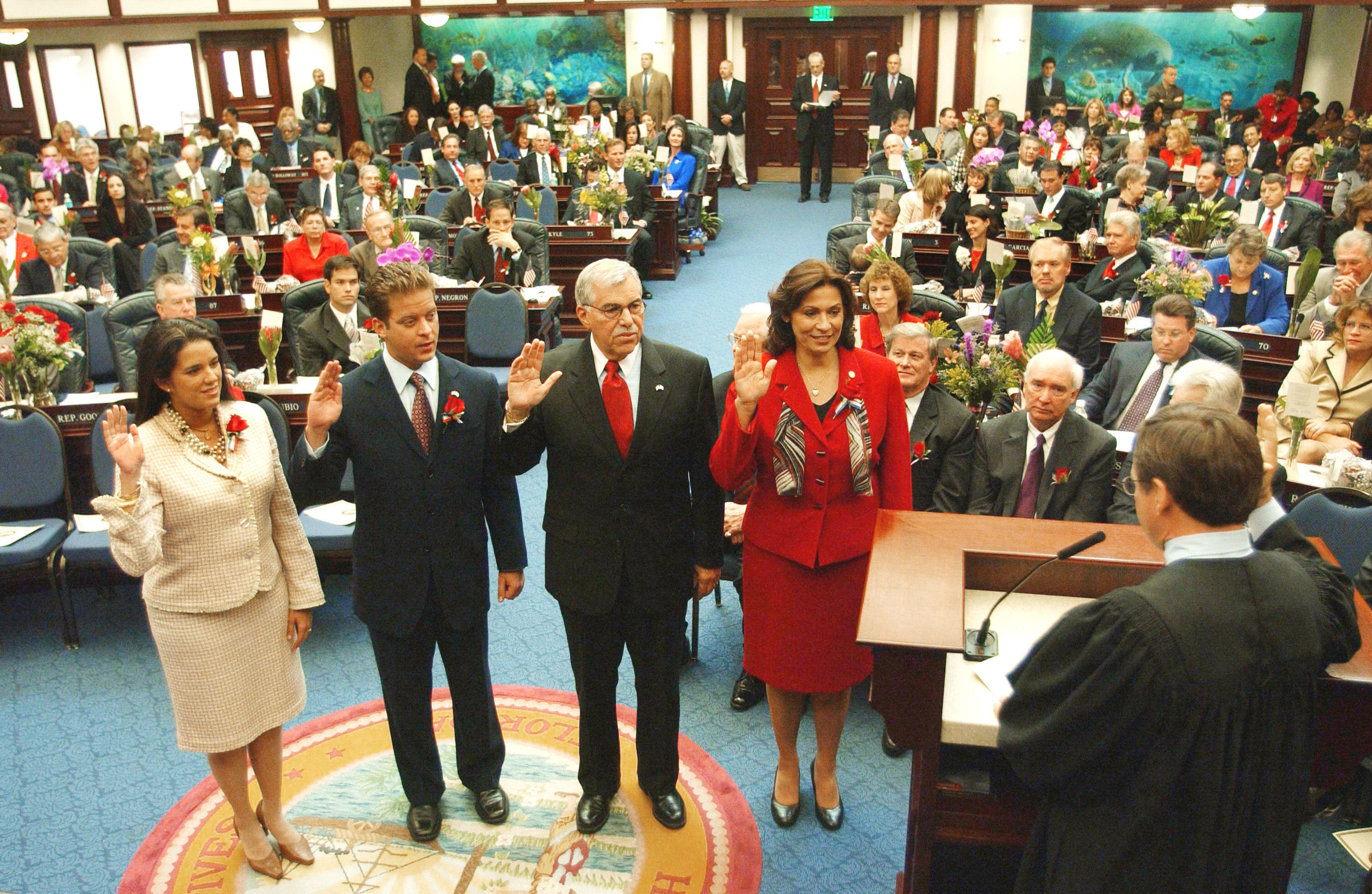
Flores being sworn in as a member of the Florida House of Representatives in 2004

In 2004, incumbent State Representative Gaston Cantens declined to seek re-election in the 114th District, which stretched from University Park to South Miami Heights in Miami-Dade County. With Cantens's endorsement, Flores ran in the Republican primary to succeed him, facing former State Representative Carlos Manrique, Victor Bao, Joel Bello, Lisa Sacco, and Luis E. Orta. Flores won the primary handily, receiving 56% of the vote, and advanced to the general election, where she faced businesswoman and Kendall community council member Millie Herrera, the Democratic nominee. Flores defeated Herrera by a wide margin, winning 64% of the vote to Herrera's 36%. Flores was re-elected without opposition in 2006 and 2008.

During her career in the Florida House, Flores served as Deputy Majority Leader, Chair of the PreK-12 Appropriations Committee, and Chair of the PreK-12 Policy Committee. In order to increase college completion, she passed legislation that created a scholarship program for students who are the first in their family to attend college.

== Florida Senate ==
When State Senator J. Alex Villalobos was unable to seek re-election due to term limits, Flores ran to succeed him in the 38th District, which stretched from Doral to Homestead. She faced David Nelson in the Republican primary and defeated him handily, winning 81% of the vote to Nelson's 19%. Flores faced veterinarian Les Gerson, the Democratic nominee, in the general election. After vastly outspending Gerson, Flores won the seat in a landslide, receiving 68% of the vote to Gerson's 32%.

Following the reconfiguration of the state's legislative districts, Flores ran for re-election in the 37th District, which contained most of the territory that she had previously represented. She was unopposed in the Republican primary and the general election, and won her second term uncontested.

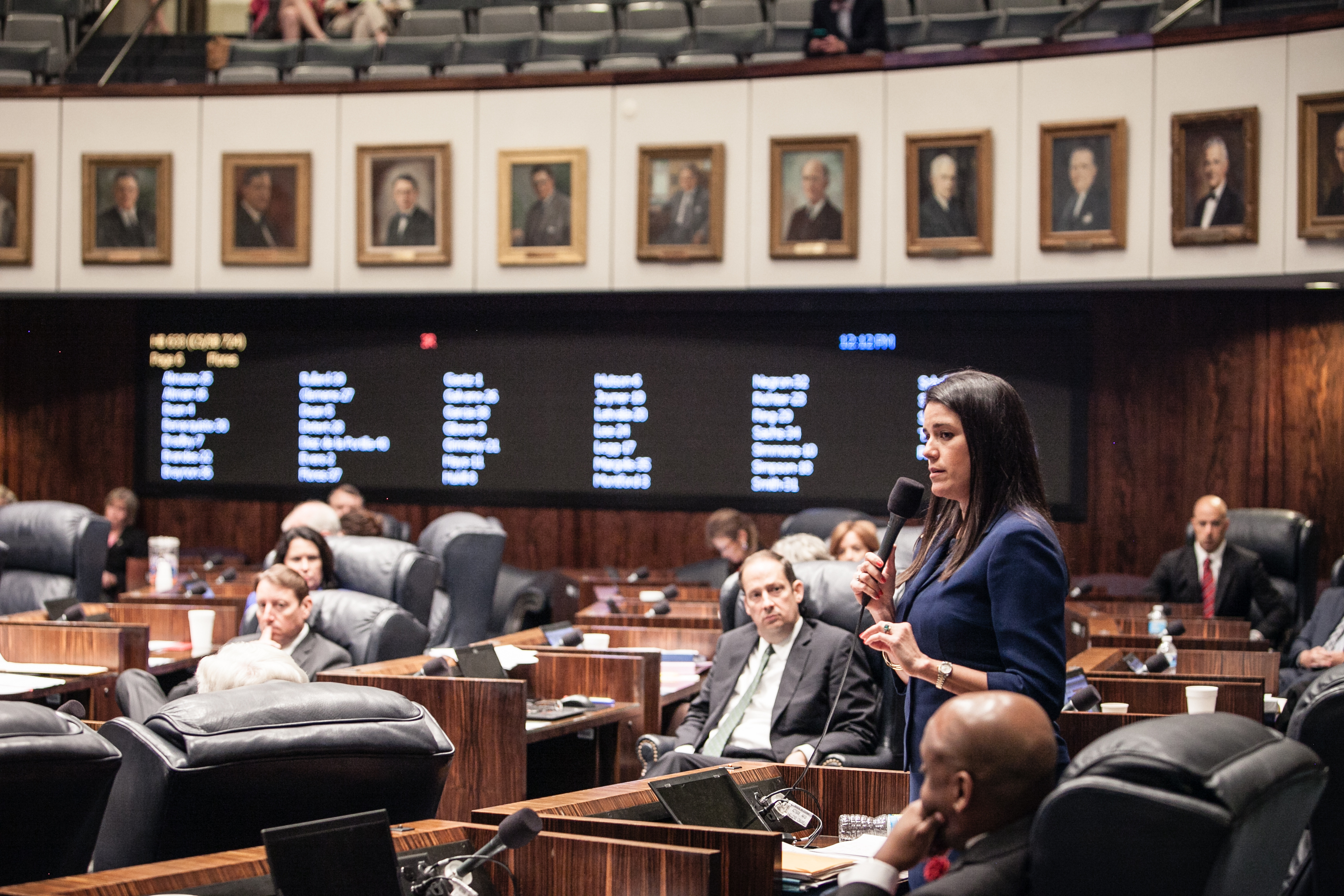
Flores on the floor of the Senate.

As a member of the Florida Senate, Flores chaired several committees including the Judiciary Committee, Communications, Energy and Public Utilities Committee, Fiscal Policy Committee, Banking and Insurance Committee, and Appropriations Subcommittee on Health and Human Services. She also served on various committees including the Budget Subcommittee on Criminal and Civil Justice, the Ethics and Elections Committee, the Health Policy Committee, the Regulated Industry Committee, the Rules Committee, and the Appropriations Committee. From 2010 to 2012, Flores also served as the Majority Whip. In the Senate, she championed several issues important to South Florida, including working towards finding affordable options for property insurance.

Flores also serves on various national and community boards. She is a member of the National Assessment Governing Board (a bipartisan board that sets policy for the National Assessment of Educational Progress-NAEP), the National Association of Latino Elected Officials (a leadership organization of the Hispanic elected and appointed public officials in the United States), and the Board of Spectrum Programs, Inc. (a drug and mental health service organization).

Flores was the first Republican Hispanic woman to serve in both the Florida House and Senate since 1986. Due to her unwavering support of education, the American entrepreneurial spirit as well as the elderly, she was most recently recognized in The Huffington Post's “40 under 40: Latinos in American Politics.” Her campaign website describes her as a conservative.

In 2015, litigation concerning Florida Senate maps was resolved with an admission by the Senate that the maps violated the Fair Districts provision of the Florida Constitution. Following the inability of the legislature to create and pass new maps into law, the Florida Supreme Court selected maps drawn by the League of Women Voters of Florida. Consequently, Flores's home was drawn into the 40th District, the same district in which fellow State Senator Dwight Bullard lived. Flores decided to run for re-election in the 39th District instead, given that she was raised in that district and previously represented portions of it. Flores defeated Democrat Debbie Mucarsel-Powell in the general election, 54 to 46%.

During the opening of the 2018 Florida Legislative Session, Flores and Democratic Florida legislator Oscar Braynon jointly apologized for an extramarital affair they had, which had been made public when an anonymous website uploaded a video showing Flores entering and leaving Braynon's apartment on multiple occasions.

For the 2019 and 2020 Sessions, Flores chaired the Community Affairs Committee, and served as Deputy Majority Leader. After sixteen years in office, Flores was term-limited from the Senate in November 2020.

Florida House of Representatives
| Preceded by Gaston Cantens | Member of the Florida House of Representatives from the 114th district 2004–2010 | Succeeded by Ana Rivas Logan |
Florida Senate
| Preceded by J. Alex Villalobos | Member of the Florida Senate from the 38th district 2010–2012 | Succeeded by René García |
| Preceded by Garrett Richter | Member of the Florida Senate from the 37th district 2012–2016 | Succeeded by José Javier Rodríguez |
| Preceded by Dwight Bullard | Member of the Florida Senate from the 39th district 2016–2020 | Succeeded by Ana Maria Rodriguez |
| Preceded by Garrett Richter | President pro tempore of the Florida Senate; 2016–2018 | Succeeded by David Simmons |
