= Gaston Cantens =

American politician

Gaston I. Cantens
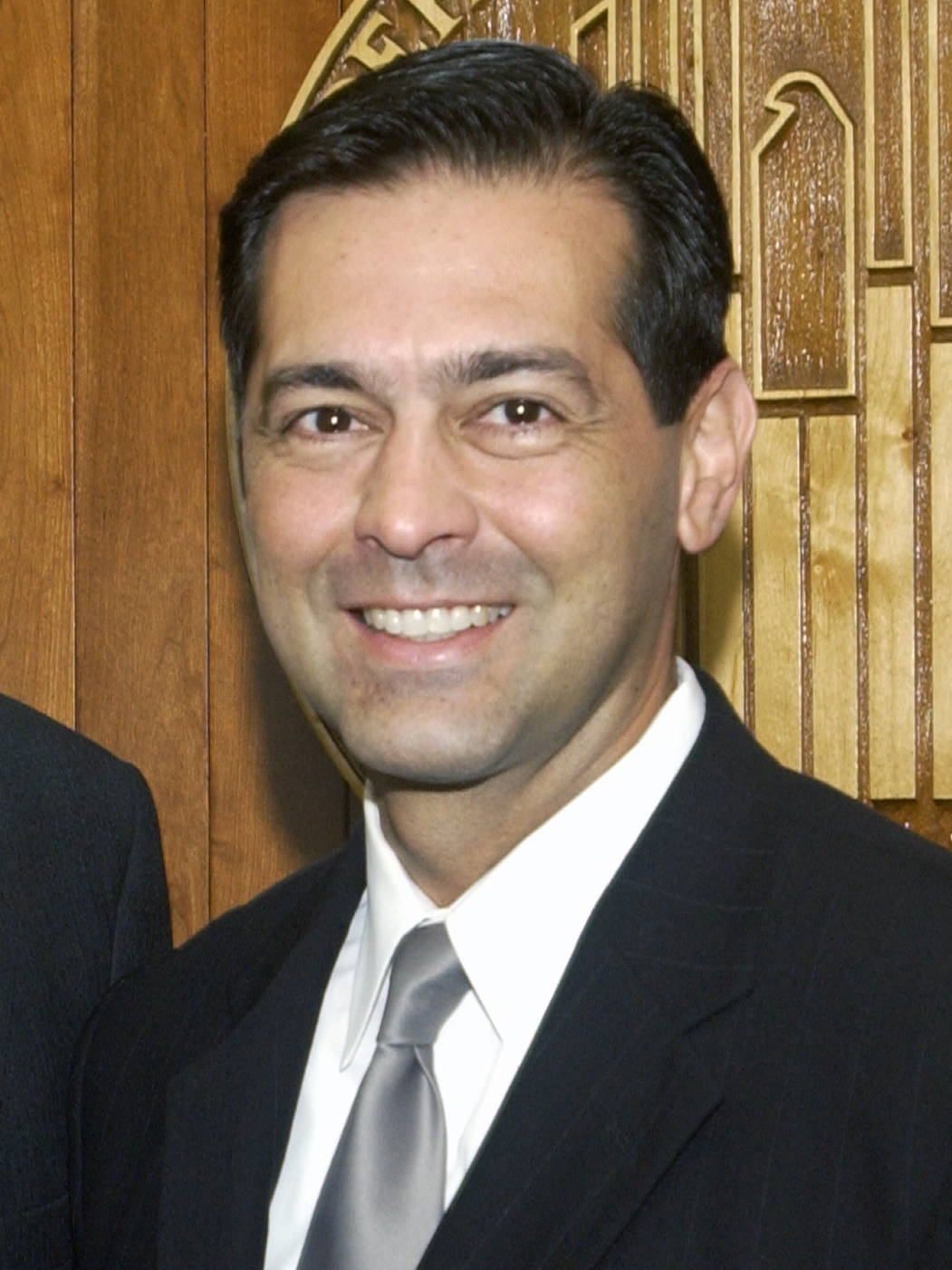

Member of the Florida House of Representatives from the 114th district
- In office 1998–2004
- Preceded by: Jorge Rodriguez-Chomat
- Succeeded by: Anitere Flores

Personal details
- Born: Gaston Ignacio Cantens; October 25, 1961 (age 64) Miami, Florida
- Spouse: Ana
- Children: 3
- Education: University of Miami (BA); St. Thomas University (JD)

Gaston Ignacio Cantens (born October 25, 1961) is an American politician from Miami, Florida who was a member of the Florida House of Representatives from 1998 to 2004. Cantens is a vice president of a sugar company, Florida Crystals.

== Early life and work ==
Cantens was born October 25, 1961, in Miami, Florida.

Cantens received a B.A. from the University of Miami in 1982 and graduated from St. Thomas University Law School in 1992.

Cantens was a math teacher and a basketball coach at the high school and college levels. In 1985.he became the first head coach of Hispanic origin in the NCAA, and one of the youngest, at the age of 25, at Barry University.

== Political career ==
Cantens was an Assistant State Attorney for the 11th Judicial Circuit of Florida (1995–1998). During his tenure there he was the Assistant Chief of the County Court Division as well as a felony prosecutor. He was a Director of the Dade County Bar Association (1996-1999) and a Director of the Cuban-American Bar Association (1997).

Cantens was elected to the Florida House of Representatives as a Republican for District 114 in 1998 and reelected for two more terms. Cantens was named a Chairman of a legislative committee as a freshman legislator. During his tenure, he served in various leadership positions, including Majority Whip, and was consistently ranked as one of the most effective legislators in the Florida House and was considered a rising star in the Florida GOP.

In 2000, then Speaker of the Florida House, Tom Feeney, tapped Cantens to be the sponsor of the concurrent resolution to appoint the Florida electors that would have decided the 2000 Presidential election in Florida had the United States Supreme Court not concluded its rulings in Bush v. Gore. He also played an integral role in the Florida Constitutional amendment that required parental notification before a minor could have an abortion; legislation to create the Breast Cancer Research license plate as well as legislation to protect victims of sexual battery.

Cantens sponsored the legislation that authorized the college of law at Florida International University (FIU) & Florida Agricultural & Mechanical University (FAMU).

== Later work ==
Cantens is a vice president of Florida Crystals Corporation, a sugar company with headquarters in Palm Beach County, Florida, where his work includes corporate relations and government affairs.
