= J. Alex Villalobos =

American politician

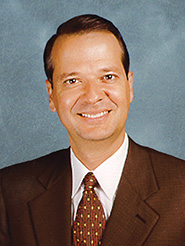
- Official portrait, 2006

Member of the Florida Senate from the 38th district
- In office January 20, 2003 – January 3, 2011
- Preceded by: Ron Silver
- Succeeded by: Anitere Flores

Member of the Florida Senate from the 37th district
- In office January 3, 2001 – January 3, 2003
- Preceded by: Mario Díaz-Balart
- Succeeded by: Burt Saunders

Member of the Florida House of Representatives from the 112th district
- In office January 3, 1993 – January 3, 2001
- Preceded by: Carlos L. Valdes
- Succeeded by: Mario Díaz-Balart

Personal details
- Born: Jose Alex Villalobos; November 2, 1963 (age 63) Miami, Florida, U.S.
- Party: Republican
- Spouse: Barbara Villalobos (m. 1985)
- Children: 1
- Education: University of Miami (BA); Florida State University (JD)
- Profession: Attorney

Jose Alex Villalobos (born November 2, 1963) is an American lawyer and former politician. He was a Republican member of the Florida Senate, representing the 38th District from 2001 through 2010. Previously he was a member of the Florida House of Representatives from 1993 through 2000. He served as the Republican Majority Whip from 2001 to 2002 and as the Republican Majority Leader from 2004 to 2006 in the Florida Senate.

He received his (B.A.) degree from the University of Miami and his J.D. degree from Florida State University. He later served as an Assistant State Attorney for the Second Judicial Circuit of Florida.

He and his wife have one child. His grandfather, Lolo Villalobos was re-elected six consecutive times as mayor of Guanabacoa, Cuba (1940–1959).

Since leaving the legislature, Villalobos has been an outspoken advocate for reform of the judicial system. He is the founding president of Democracy at Stake and also serves on the board of directors for Justice at Stake, a national judicial watchdog group. In 1995 he was an adjunct professor of Constitutional Law at Florida International University.

Villalobos is the original incorporator of Accountable Florida Inc., according to the organization's Articles of Incorporation, available on Florida's Department of State website, www.sunbiz.org. Accountable Florida Inc. is an active not-for-profit corporation, with its Articles of Incorporation filed on February 9, 2023.

Villalobos currently practices law and serves as Of Counsel with the firm of Meyer, Brooks, Demma and Blohm.

Florida House of Representatives
Preceded by Carlos L. Valdes	Member of the Florida House of Representatives from the 112th district 1993–2001	Succeeded by Mario Díaz-Balart
Florida Senate
Preceded by Mario Díaz-Balart	Member of the Florida Senate from the 37th district 2001–2003	Succeeded by Burt Saunders
Preceded by Ron Silver	Member of the Florida Senate from the 38th district 2003–2011	Succeeded by Anitere Flores
