= American Son =

American Son may refer to:

- American Son (2008 film), a drama film starring Nick Cannon
- American Son (2019 film), a drama film starring Kerry Washington
- American Son (album), an album by Levon Helm
- American Son, an album by Tim Rose
- American Son, an album by Tom Breiding
- American Son, an autobiography by Oscar De La Hoya
- An American Son: A Memoir, an autobiography by Marco Rubio
- American Sons, a 1994 film by Steven Okazaki
- American Son, a fictional powered armor and alias used by Harry Osborn in Marvel Comics
