= Arnhilda Gonzalez-Quevedo =

American politician

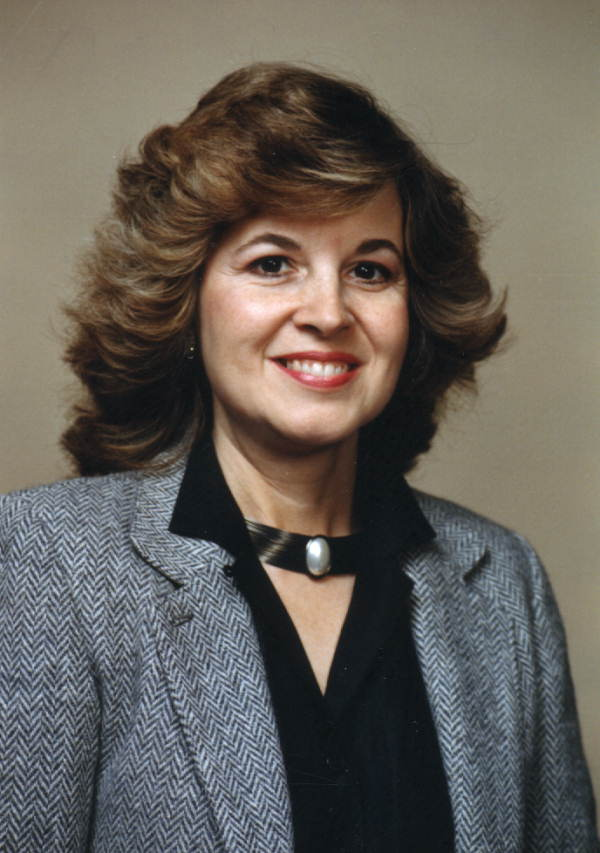
- Gonzalez-Quevedo in 1984

Member of the Florida House of Representatives from the 112th district
- In office 1984–1988
- Preceded by: John Cosgrove
- Succeeded by: Carlos L. Valdes

Personal details
- Party: Democratic (since May 1988); Republican (before May 1988)
- Education: University of North Carolina

Arnhilda Badia Gonzalez-Quevedo is an American politician in the state of Florida. She served in the Florida House of Representatives between 1984 and 1988.

== Early life ==
Gonzalez-Quevedo grew up in Havana, Cuba, before moving to the United States as a teenager. She was eighteen when she had a son with her husband, Benito Gonzalez-Quevedo. She received a masters and a doctoral degree in Romance languages and linguistics from the University of North Carolina. She worked as a professor and an administrator at Florida International University, serving as the vice-president for academic affairs.

== Political career ==
Gonzalez-Quevedo ran as a candidate for the Florida House of Representatives in the 1984 general election for the 112th district. She was one of four Republicans in the primary, all Cuban Americans, which went to a run-off in October. She ran and won against the incumbent, Democrat John Cosgrove, in the general election. She was a member of the children and youth ad hoc committee, the health and rehabilitative services committee, the higher education committee, and the tourism and economic development committee.

During her first term, she proposed the Quality Assurance Act, to fund summer classes for Florida state universities and community colleges to allow students to graduate on time, and the Management Training Act, to train minority staff at the institutions. She helped pass two childcare amendments during the legislative special session. Gonzalez-Quevedo sponsored the Florida Small and Minority Business Assistance Act in 1985 and the following year, proposed a commission to develop programs for teenage mothers. In September 1987, she presented the administrator of the Bay of Pigs Museum with $75,000 from the state for its construction. She passed legislation to establish the Jose Martí Scholarship Challenge Grant.

Gonzalez-Quevedo changed parties from Republican to Independent on May 19, 1988, due to differences on policy issues. She was asked by the Speaker of the House, Jon Mills, to join the budget committee but declined the appointment. Following her decision, fellow Democratic legislators passed a bill to repeal a state law banning candidates from changing parties within six months of an election. She ultimately decided not to run for re-election. She continued her career as a professor at Florida International University.
