= Florida's 111th House of Representatives district =

Florida district

Florida's 111th State House of Representatives district
Representative
David Borrero; R–Sweetwater, Miami-Dade County

Florida's 111th House of Representatives district elects one member of the Florida House of Representatives. It contains parts of Miami-Dade County.

== Members ==
- Roberto Casas (1982–1988)
- Carlos L. Valdes (1992–2000)
- Marco Rubio (2000–2008)
- Erik Fresen (2008–2012)
- Eduardo González (2012–2014)
- Bryan Avila (2014–2022)
- David Borrero (since 2022) (Redistricting)
