= Carlos L. Valdes =

American politician

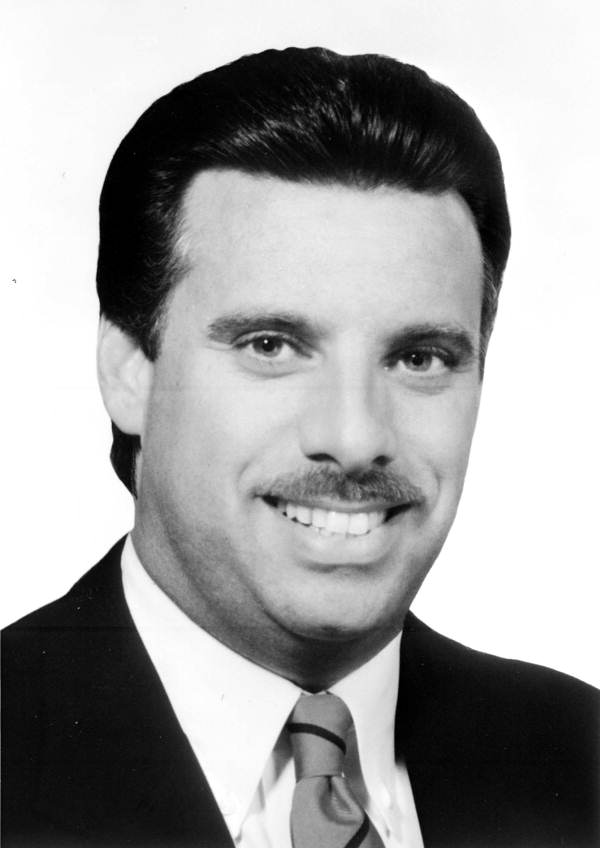

Member of the Florida House of Representatives
- In office November 8, 1988 – January 25, 2000
- Preceded by: Arnhilda Gonzalez-Quevedo
- Succeeded by: Marco Rubio
- Constituency: 112th District (1988–1992); 111th District (1992–2000)

Personal details
- Born: May 4, 1951 (age 75) Havana, Cuba
- Party: Republican
- Education: Miami Dade College (AA)
- Occupation: Realtor, Martgage Broker

Carlos L. Valdes (born May 4, 1951) was an American politician in the state of Florida.

Valdes was born in Havana in 1951. He immigrated to the United States with his family in 1960. He received an AA degree from Miami Dade College in 1971 and attended Florida International University from 1972 to 1973. In 1974, he became a licensed real estate and mortgage broker. He served in the Florida House of Representatives for the 112th district from 1988 to 1992 and for the 111th district from 1992 to 2000, as a Republican. He resigned from the House of Representatives on January 25, 2000. In the House of Representatives, he served as Republican Floor Leader from 1992 to 1994 and as Republican Whip from 1994 to 1996.

Florida House of Representatives
Preceded by Arnhilda Gonzalez-Quevedo	Member of the Florida House of Representatives from the 112th district 1988–1992	Succeeded by J. Alex Villalobos
Preceded by Rudy García	Member of the Florida House of Representatives from the 111th district 1992–2000	Succeeded by Marco Rubio
