= Alex Rizo =

American politician

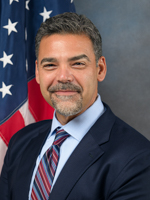

Member of the Florida House of Representatives
- Incumbent
- Assumed office November 3, 2020
- Preceded by: José R. Oliva
- Constituency: 110th district (2020–2022); 112th district (2022–present)

Personal details
- Born: 1967 (age 58–59) New York City, New York, U.S.
- Party: Republican
- Children: 2
- Education: Florida International University (BS); Nova Southeastern University (MS)

Alejandro Rizo Jr. (born 1968) is an American politician and former educator serving as a member of the Florida House of Representatives from the 112th district. He assumed office on November 3, 2020.

== Early life and education ==
Rizo was born in New York City and raised in Hialeah, Florida. After graduating from Hialeah Senior High School, he earned a Bachelor of Science degree in biological sciences from Florida International University and a Master of Science in educational leadership and administration from Nova Southeastern University.

== Career ==
From 1995 to 1998, Rizo was a teacher and coach at Barbara Goleman Senior High School. From 1998 to 2006, he was an administrator in the Miami-Dade County Public Schools. In 2006 and 2007, he was a sales representative for Houghton Mifflin Harcourt, assigned to the South Florida region. Since 2007, he has worked as an education consultant. He also served as a member of the Miami-Dade Board of County Commissioners. Rizo was elected to the Florida House of Representatives in November 2020. Rizo is a member of the House Health & Human Services Committee. In May 2021, he was appointed to the House Subcommittee on Gaming Regulation.

In 2021, Rizo proposed legislation that would make it a crime to film police officers within 30 feet.
