= Florida's 112th House of Representatives district =

Florida district

Florida's 112th State House of Representatives district
Representative
Alex Rizo; R–Hialeah

Florida's 112th House of Representatives district elects one member of the Florida House of Representatives. It contains parts of Miami-Dade County.

== Members ==
- Arnhilda Gonzalez-Quevedo (1984–1988)
- Carlos L. Valdes (1988–1992)
- J. Alex Villalobos (January 3, 1993 – January 3, 2001)
- Mario Díaz-Balart (November 7, 2000 – November 5, 2002)
- Alex Rizo (since 2022)
