= Marco Rubio =

American politician and diplomat (born 1971)

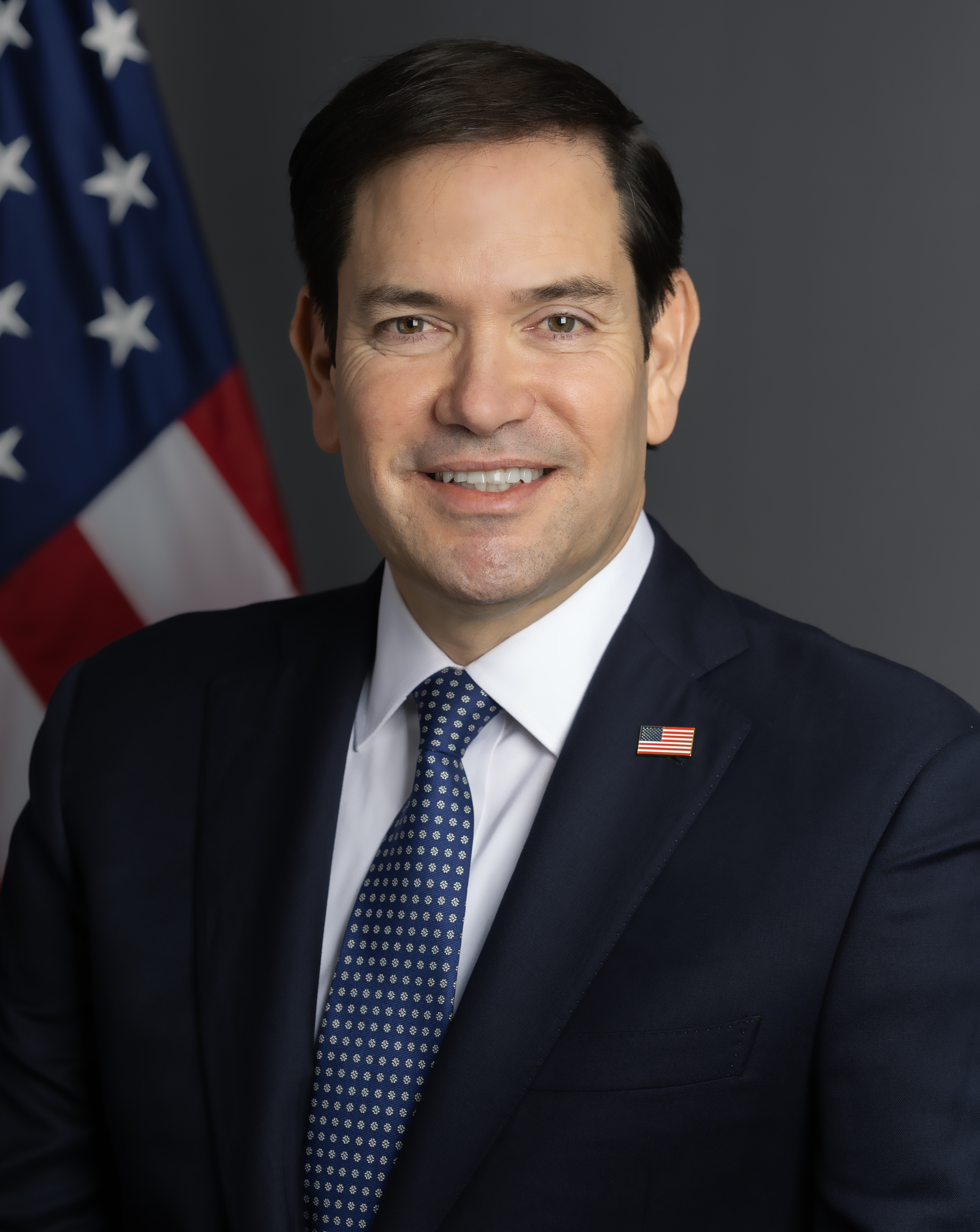
- Official portrait, 2025

72nd United States Secretary of State
- Incumbent
- Assumed office January 21, 2025
- President: Donald Trump
- Deputy: Christopher Landau
- Preceded by: Antony Blinken

30th United States National Security Advisor
- Incumbent
- Assumed office May 1, 2025; Acting: May 1, 2025 – September 22, 2026
- President: Donald Trump
- Deputy: Robert Gabriel Jr. Andy Baker; Michael Needham
- Preceded by: Mike Waltz
Other administration positions
Acting Archivist of the United States
In office February 16, 2025 – February 4, 2026
President	Donald Trump
Preceded by	William J. Bosanko (acting)
Succeeded by	Edward Forst (acting)
Acting Administrator of the United States Agency for International Development
In office February 3, 2025 – August 29, 2025
President	Donald Trump
Preceded by	Jason Gray (acting)
Succeeded by	Russell Vought (acting)

United States Senator from Florida
- In office January 3, 2011 – January 20, 2025
- Preceded by: George LeMieux
- Succeeded by: Ashley Moody
Committee positions
Vice Chair of the Senate Intelligence Committee
In office February 3, 2021 – January 3, 2025
Preceded by	Mark Warner
Succeeded by	Mark Warner
Chair of the Senate Intelligence Committee
Acting; May 18, 2020 – February 3, 2021
Preceded by	Richard Burr
Succeeded by	Mark Warner
Chair of the Senate Small Business Committee
In office January 3, 2019 – February 3, 2021
Preceded by	Jim Risch
Succeeded by	Ben Cardin
State and Local offices
94th Speaker of the Florida House of Representatives
In office November 21, 2006 – November 18, 2008
Preceded by	Allan Bense
Succeeded by	Ray Sansom
Member of the Florida House of Representatives from the 111th district
In office January 25, 2000 – November 18, 2008
Preceded by	Carlos L. Valdes
Succeeded by	Erik Fresen
Member of the West Miami City Commission
In office April 14, 1998 – January 25, 2000
Preceded by	Tania Rozio
Succeeded by	Luciano Suarez

Personal details
- Born: Marco Antonio Rubio; May 28, 1971 (age 55) Miami, Florida, U.S.
- Party: Republican
- Spouse: Jeanette Dousdebes (m. 1998)
- Children: 4
- Education: University of Florida (BA); University of Miami (JD)
- Rubio's voice Rubio speaks on the 2026 fiscal year Department of State budget request. Recorded May 21, 2025

Marco Antonio Rubio (/ˈruːbioʊ/ ROO-bee-oh; born May 28, 1971) is an American politician, attorney, and diplomat serving as the 72nd United States secretary of state since 2025. He is also serving as the 30th United States national security advisor. A member of the Republican Party, Rubio represented Florida in the United States Senate from 2011 to 2025.

Rubio was born and raised in Miami. He attended the University of Florida and the University of Miami's law school. After serving as a city commissioner for West Miami in the 1990s, he was elected in 2000 to represent the 111th district in the Florida House of Representatives. As the Republican majority leader, he was subsequently elected Speaker of the Florida House; he served for two years beginning in November 2006. Rubio left the Florida legislature in 2008 due to term limits, and began teaching at Florida International University. In a three-way race, Rubio was elected to the U.S. Senate in 2010. In April 2015, he launched a presidential bid instead of seeking reelection. He suspended his campaign for the presidency on March 15, 2016, after losing to Donald Trump in the Florida Republican primary. He then ran for reelection to the Senate and won a second term. Despite his criticism of Trump during his presidential campaign, Rubio endorsed him before the 2016 general election and was largely supportive of his presidency.

Due to his influence on U.S. policy on Latin America during the first Trump administration, he was described as a "virtual secretary of state for Latin America". He was also considered to have been one of Congress's most hawkish members with regard to China and the Chinese Communist Party. The Chinese government sanctioned him twice in 2020 and he was banned from entering China until he became Secretary of State. Rubio became Florida's senior senator in January 2019, following the defeat of former senator Bill Nelson, and was reelected to a third term in 2022, defeating Democratic nominee Val Demings in a landslide victory. Rubio endorsed Trump for president in 2024 days before the Iowa caucuses.

In November 2024, President-elect Trump announced his intention to nominate Rubio to be secretary of state in his second administration. Rubio was confirmed unanimously by the U.S. Senate and took office on January 21, 2025. On May 1, 2025, Trump announced that Rubio would become acting national security advisor, replacing Mike Waltz, while continuing to serve as secretary of state. This dual role was last held by Henry Kissinger from 1973 to 1975 (serving a combined tenure in one or both positions from 1969 to 1977) in the Nixon and Ford administrations. In February 2025, Rubio also became the acting archivist of the United States and the acting USAID administrator, holding these roles until February 2026 and August 2025, respectively. He is the first Latino to serve as secretary of state or national security advisor, making him the highest-ranking Hispanic American official in U.S. history.

== Early life and education ==
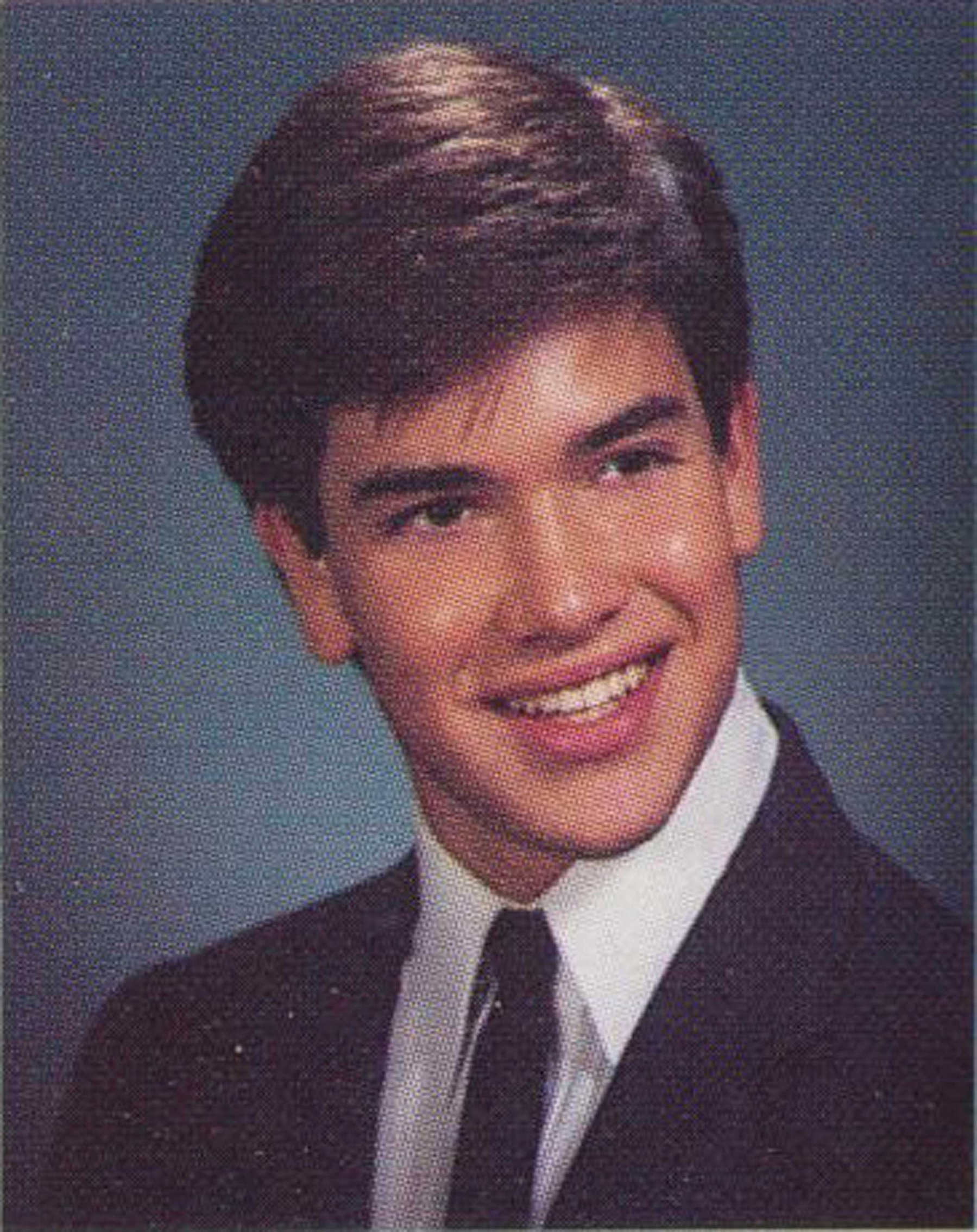
Rubio's 1989 high school senior year yearbook photo

Marco Antonio Rubio was born on May 28, 1971, in Miami, Florida. He is the second son and third child of Mario Rubio Reina and Oriales Rubio (née García Rodríguez). His parents were Cubans, of Spanish and Italian descent, who immigrated to the United States in 1956 during the regime of Fulgencio Batista, two and a half years before Fidel Castro ascended to power after the Cuban Revolution. Rubio's parents were not U.S. citizens at the time of Rubio's birth. They were naturalized in 1975.

Rubio's maternal grandfather, Pedro Victor García, immigrated to the U.S. legally in 1956, but returned to Cuba to find work in 1959. When in 1962 he fled communist Cuba and returned to the U.S. without a visa, he was detained as an undocumented immigrant and an immigration judge ordered him to be deported. But immigration officials reversed their decision later that day, and the deportation order was not enforced. Instead, García was reclassified to the legal status of "parolee" that allowed him to stay in the U.S. He reapplied for permanent resident status in 1966 after the Cuban Adjustment Act passed, and his residency was approved. Rubio had a close relationship with his grandfather during his childhood. Two of Rubio's aunts and an uncle were also admitted to the U.S. as refugees.

Rubio's parents left Cuba in 1956, during the regime of Fulgencio Batista and two and a half years before the Cuban Revolution. Rubio's mother made at least four return trips to Cuba after Castro's takeover, including a month-long trip in 1961 with the intention of returning the family permanently. In October 2011, The Washington Post reported that Rubio's previous statements that his parents were forced to leave Cuba in 1959 (after Fidel Castro came to power) were falsehoods. According to the Post, "[in] Florida, being connected to the post-revolution exile community gives a politician cachet that could never be achieved by someone identified with the pre-Castro exodus, a group sometimes viewed with suspicion." Rubio denied that he had embellished his family history, saying that his public statements about his family were based on "family lore" and said that while his family had intended to return to Cuba in 1961, the revolution changed their plans. He said that the "essence of my family story is why they came to America in the first place and why they had to stay".

Rubio has three siblings: older brother Mario, older sister Barbara (married to Orlando Cicilia), and younger sister Veronica (formerly married to entertainer Carlos Ponce). From ages 8 to 11, he and his family lived in Las Vegas, where they attended the Church of Jesus Christ of Latter-day Saints. During those years in Nevada, his father worked as a bartender at Sam's Town Hotel and his mother as a housekeeper at the Imperial Palace Hotel and Casino. Rubio received his first communion as a Catholic in 1984 before moving with his family back to Miami a year later. He was confirmed. Although he changed religious affiliations several times, he is now with the Catholic Church. As a teenager, Rubio was hired by his brother-in-law Orlando Cicilia to care for the latter's dogs, and he used the money to attend Miami Dolphins games. When Rubio was 16, Cicilia was arrested and convicted of trafficking millions of dollars worth of cocaine; the Rubio family maintains that they had no knowledge of his criminal activity.

Rubio graduated from South Miami Senior High School in 1989. He attended Tarkio College in Missouri for one year on a football scholarship before enrolling at Santa Fe Community College (later Santa Fe College) in Gainesville, Florida. He transferred again and earned his Bachelor of Arts degree in political science from the University of Florida in 1993. He received his Juris Doctor, cum laude, from the University of Miami School of Law in 1996. Rubio has said that he incurred $100,000 in student loans but paid them off in 2012.

== Early career (1996–2000) ==
While studying law, Rubio interned for U.S. representative Ileana Ros-Lehtinen. He also worked on Senator Bob Dole's 1996 presidential campaign. Rubio was then elected a city commissioner for West Miami and served from April 14, 1998, to January 25, 2000. In early 2000 he was elected to the Florida House of Representatives.

== Early political career (2000–2008) ==
=== Florida House of Representatives ===
==== Elections and concurrent employment ====
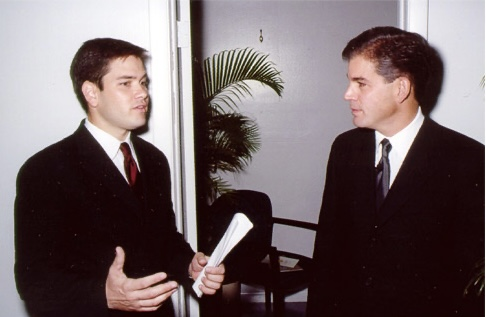
Rubio (left) speaking with Miami-Dade County Mayor Alex Penelas in 2001

In late 1999, a special election was called to fill the seat for the 111th House District in the Florida House of Representatives, representing Miami. It was considered a safe Republican seat, so Rubio's main challenge was to win the GOP nomination. He campaigned as a moderate, advocating tax cuts and early childhood education.

Rubio placed second in the Republican primary on December 14, 1999, but won the runoff election for the Republican nomination, defeating Angel Zayon (a television and radio reporter who was popular with Cuban exiles) by 64 votes. He defeated Democrat Anastasia Garcia with 72% of the vote in a January 25, 2000, special election.

In November 2000, Rubio was reelected unopposed. In 2002, he was reelected to a second term unopposed. In 2004, he was reelected to a third term with 66% of the vote. In 2006, he was reelected to a fourth term unopposed.

Rubio served in the Florida House of Representatives for nearly nine years. Since the Florida legislative session officially lasted only 60 days, he spent about half of each year in Miami, where he practiced law. He worked at a law firm that specialized in land use and zoning until 2014, when he took a position with Broad and Cassel, a Miami law and lobbying firm. (State law precluded him from engaging in lobbying or introducing legislation on behalf of the firm's clients).

==== Tenure ====
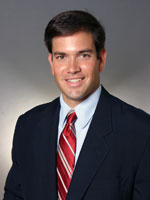
Official portrait, 2007

When Rubio took his seat in the legislature in Tallahassee in January 2000, voters in Florida had recently approved a constitutional amendment on term limits. This created openings for new legislative leaders due to many senior incumbents having to retire. According to an article in National Journal, Rubio also gained an extra advantage in that regard, because he was sworn in early due to the special election, and he would take advantage of these opportunities to join the GOP leadership.

===== Majority whip and majority leader =====
Later in 2000, the majority leader of the House, Mike Fasano, promoted Rubio to be one of two majority whips. National Journal described that position as typically requiring much arm-twisting, but said Rubio took a different approach that relied more on persuading legislators and less on coercing them.

Fasano resigned in September 2001 as majority leader of the House due to disagreements with the House speaker, and the speaker passed over Rubio to appoint a more experienced replacement for Fasano. Rubio volunteered to work on redistricting, which he accomplished by dividing the state into five regions, then working individually with the lawmakers involved, and this work helped to cement his relationships with GOP leaders.

In December 2002, Rubio was appointed House majority leader by Speaker Johnnie Byrd. He persuaded Speaker Byrd to restructure the job of majority leader, so that legislative wrangling would be left to the whip's office, and Rubio would become the main spokesperson for the House GOP.

According to National Journal, during this period Rubio did not entirely adhere to doctrinaire conservative principles, and some colleagues described him as a centrist "who sought out Democrats and groups that don't typically align with the GOP". He co-sponsored legislation that would have let farmworkers sue growers in state court if they were shortchanged on pay, and co-sponsored a bill for giving in-state tuition rates to the children of undocumented immigrants. In the wake of the September 11 attacks, he voiced suspicion about expanding police detention powers and helped defeat a GOP bill that would have required colleges to increase reporting to the state about foreign students.

As a state representative, Rubio requested legislative earmarks (called "Community Budget Issue Requests" in Florida), totaling about $145 million for 2001 and 2002, but none thereafter. Additionally, an office in the executive branch compiled a longer list of spending requests by legislators, including Rubio, as did the non-profit group Florida TaxWatch. Many of those listed items were for health and social programs that Rubio has described as "the kind of thing that legislators would get attacked on if we didn't fund them". A 2010 report by the Tampa Bay Times and Miami Herald said that some of Rubio's spending requests dovetailed with his personal interests. For example, Rubio requested a $20-million appropriation for Jackson Memorial Hospital to subsidize care for the poor and uninsured, and Rubio later did work for that hospital as a consultant. A spokesman for Rubio has said that the items in question helped the whole county, that Rubio did not lobby to get them approved, that the hospital money was necessary and non-controversial, and that Rubio is "a limited-government conservative ... not a no-government conservative".

===== House speaker =====
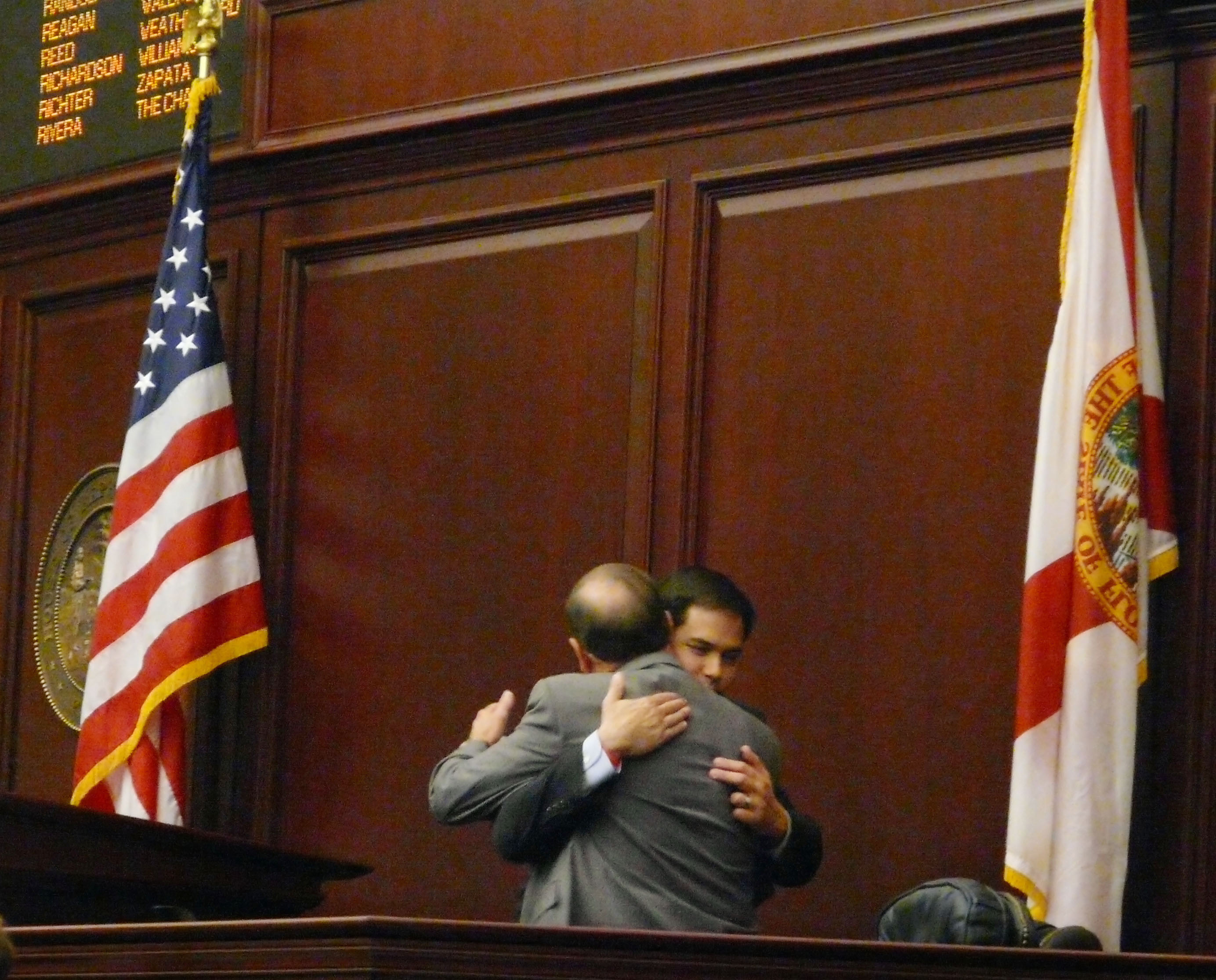
Rubio and Senate President Ken Pruitt embrace after the Florida House's unanimous approval of the Florida Senate's resolution to formally express deep regret for slavery in March 2008.

On September 13, 2005, at age 34, Rubio became speaker after state representatives Dennis Baxley, Jeff Kottkamp, and Dennis A. Ross dropped out. He was sworn in a year later, in November 2006. He became the first Cuban American to be speaker of the Florida House of Representatives, and would remain speaker until November 2008.

When he was chosen as future speaker in 2005, Rubio delivered a speech to the Florida House in which he asked members to look in their desks, where they each found a hardcover book titled 100 Innovative Ideas For Florida's Future; but the book was blank because it had not yet been written, and Rubio told his colleagues that they would fill in the pages together with the help of ordinary Floridians. In 2006, after traveling around the state and talking with citizens, and compiling their ideas, Rubio published the book. The National Journal called this book "the centerpiece of Rubio's early speakership". About 24 of the "ideas" became law, while another 10 were partially enacted. Among the items from his 2006 book that became law were multiple-year car registrations, a requirement that high schools provide more vocational courses, and an expanded voucher-like school-choice program. Rubio's defenders, and some critics, point out that nationwide economic difficulties overlapped with much of Rubio's speakership, and so funding new legislative proposals became difficult.

As Rubio took office as Speaker, Jeb Bush was completing his term as governor, and Bush left office in January 2007. Rubio hired 18 Bush aides, leading Capitol insiders to say the speaker's suite was "the governor's office in exile". An article in National Journal described Rubio's style as being very different from Bush's; where Bush was a very assertive manager of affairs in Tallahassee, Rubio's style was to delegate certain powers, relinquish others, and invite political rivals into his inner circle. As the incoming speaker, he decided to open a private dining room for legislators, which he said would give members more privacy, free from being pursued by lobbyists, though the expense led to a public relations problem.

In 2006, the Florida Legislature passed a law limiting the state government's authority to take private property, in response to the U.S. Supreme Court's 2005 decision Kelo v. City of New London, which took a broad view of governmental power to take private property under eminent domain. The legislation was proposed by a special committee chaired by Rubio before his speakership.

Jeb Bush was succeeded by Charlie Crist, a moderate Republican who took office in January 2007. Rubio and Crist clashed frequently. Their sharpest clash involved the governor's initiative to expand casino gambling in Florida. Rubio sued Crist for bypassing the Florida Legislature in order to make a deal with the Seminole Tribe. The Supreme Court of Florida sided with Rubio and blocked the deal.

Rubio also was a critic of Crist's strategy to fight climate change through an executive order creating new automobile and utility emissions standards. Rubio accused Crist of imposing "European-style big government mandates", and the legislature under Rubio's leadership weakened the impact of Crist's climate change initiative. Rubio said that Crist's approach would harm consumers by driving up utility bills without having much effect upon the environment, and that a better approach would be to promote biofuel (e.g. ethanol), solar panels, and energy efficiency.

Rubio introduced a plan to reduce state property taxes to 2001 levels (and potentially eliminate them altogether), while increasing sales taxes by 1% to 2.5% to fund schools. The proposal would have reduced property taxes in the state by $40–50 billion. His proposal passed the House, but was opposed by Governor Crist and Florida Senate Republicans, who said that the increase in sales tax would disproportionately affect the poor. So, Rubio agreed to smaller changes, and Crist's proposal to double the state's property tax exemption from $25,000 to $50,000 (for a tax reduction estimated by Crist to be $33 billion) ultimately passed. Legislators called it the largest tax cut in Florida's history up until then. At the time, Republican anti-tax activist Grover Norquist described Rubio as "the most pro-taxpayer legislative leader in the country".

As Speaker, Rubio "aggressively tried to push Florida to the political right", according to NBC News, and frequently clashed with the Florida Senate, which was run by more moderate Republicans, and with then-Governor Charlie Crist, a centrist Republican at the time. Although a conservative, "behind the scenes many Democrats considered Rubio someone with whom they could work", according to biographer Manuel Roig-Franzia. Dan Gelber of Miami, the House Democratic leader at the time of Rubio's speakership, considered him "a true conservative" but not "a reflexive partisan", saying: "He didn't have an objection to working with the other side simply because they were the other side. To put it bluntly, he wasn't a jerk." Gelber considered Rubio "a severe conservative, really far to the right, but probably the most talented spokesman the severe right could ever hope for."

While speaker of the Florida House, Rubio shared a residence in Tallahassee with another Florida state representative, David Rivera, which the two co-owned. The house later went into foreclosure in 2010 after several missed mortgage payments. At that point, Rubio assumed responsibility for the payments, and the house was eventually sold.

In 2007, Florida state senator Tony Hill (D-Jacksonville), chairman of the state legislature's Black Caucus, requested that the legislature apologize for slavery, and Rubio said the idea merited discussion. The following year, a supportive Rubio said such apologies can be important albeit symbolic; he pointed out that even in 2008 young African-American males "believe that the American dream is not available to them". He helped set up a council on issues facing black men and boys, persuaded colleagues to replicate the Harlem Children's Zone in the Miami neighborhood of Liberty City, and supported efforts to promote literacy and mentoring for black children and others.

In 2010, during Rubio's Senate campaign, and again in 2015 during his presidential campaign, issues were raised by the media and his political opponents about some items charged by Rubio to his Republican Party of Florida American Express card during his time as House speaker. Rubio charged about $110,000 during those two years, of which $16,000 was personal expenses unrelated to party business, such as groceries and plane tickets. Rubio said that he personally paid American Express more than $16,000 for these personal expenses. In 2012, the Florida Commission on Ethics cleared Rubio of wrongdoing in his use of the party-issued credit card, although the commission inspector said that Rubio exhibited a "level of negligence" in not using his personal MasterCard. In November 2015, Rubio released his party credit card statements for January 2005 through October 2006, which showed eight personal charges totaling $7,243.74, all of which he had personally reimbursed, in most instances by the next billing period. When releasing the charge records, Rubio spokesman Todd Harris said, "These statements are more than 10 years old. And the only people who ask about them today are the liberal media and our political opponents. We are releasing them now because Marco has nothing to hide."

== Academic career (2008–2011) ==
After leaving the Florida Legislature in 2008, Rubio began teaching under a fellowship appointment at Florida International University (FIU) as an adjunct professor. In 2011, after entering the U.S. Senate, he rejoined the FIU faculty. He has taught undergraduate courses on Florida politics, political parties, and legislative politics.

Rubio's appointment as an FIU professor was initially criticized. The university obtained considerable state funding when Rubio was speaker of the Florida House, and many other university jobs were being eliminated due to funding issues at the time FIU appointed him to the faculty. When Rubio accepted the fellowship appointment as an adjunct professor at FIU, he agreed to raise most of the funding for his position from private sources.

== U.S. Senate (2011–2025) ==
=== Elections ===
==== 2010 ====
On May 5, 2009, Rubio announced his candidacy for the U.S. Senate seat being vacated by Mel Martínez, who had decided not to seek reelection and resigned before completing his term. Before launching his campaign, Rubio met with fundraisers and supporters throughout the state. Initially trailing by double digits in the primary against the incumbent governor of his own party, Charlie Crist, Rubio eventually surpassed Crist in polling for the Republican nomination. In his campaign, Rubio received the support of members of the Tea Party, many of whom were dissatisfied with Crist's policies as governor. On April 28, 2010, Crist said he would run without a party affiliation, effectively ceding the Republican nomination to Rubio. Several of Crist's top fundraisers, as well as Republican leadership, refused to support Crist after Rubio won the Republican nomination.

On November 2, 2010, Rubio won the general election with 49% of the vote to Crist's 30% and Democrat Kendrick Meek's 20%. When Rubio was sworn in to the U.S. Senate, he and Bob Menendez of New Jersey were the only two Hispanic Americans in the Senate.

==== 2016 ====
In April 2015, Rubio ran for president instead of seeking reelection to the Senate, pledging to either become president or return to private life. He suspended his presidential campaign on March 15, 2016, and started his Senate reelection campaign on June 22, after weeks of pressure from other Republican politicians. Rubio won the Republican primary on August 30, defeating Carlos Beruff. He defeated Democratic nominee Patrick Murphy in the general election, 52% to 44%.

==== 2022 ====
In November 2020, Rubio announced he would run for a third Senate term in the 2022 election. He faced Democratic challenger Val Demings, the U.S. representative for Florida's 10th congressional district and a former police officer. Rubio criticized Demings as an "ineffective member of Congress and a puppet of Nancy Pelosi; she's voted with Nancy Pelosi 100% of the time". Demings criticized Rubio's attendance record in the Senate, and in a campaign ad said Rubio had "one of the worst attendance records in the Senate. When Florida needs you, you just don't show up." Demings also claimed that Rubio supported tax hikes, but this was proven false. Rubio won the November 8 general election with 58% of the vote to Demings's 41%.

=== Tenure as senator ===
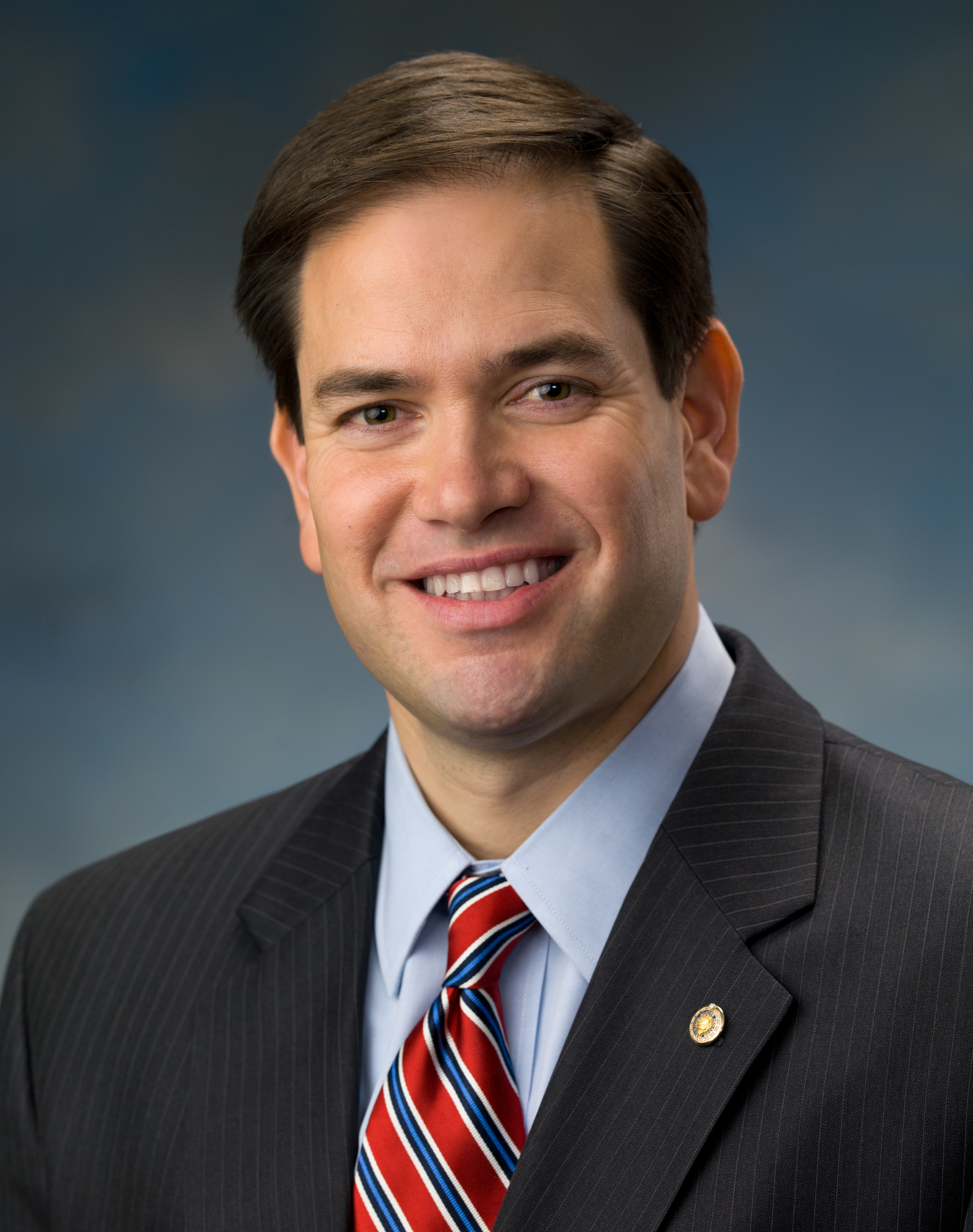
Official portrait, 2011

During Rubio's first four years in the U.S. Senate, Republicans were in the minority. After the 2014 midterm elections, the Republicans obtained majority control of the Senate, giving Rubio and the Republicans vast federal influence during the final two years of Barack Obama's presidency, as well as during all four years of Donald Trump's presidency. After the 2020 elections, the Democrats regained majority control of the Senate, and Republicans again reassumed minority status within the Senate.

==== 112th Congress (2011–2013) ====
Shortly after taking office in 2011, Rubio said he had no interest in running for president or vice president in the 2012 presidential election. In March 2012, when he endorsed Mitt Romney for president, Rubio said that he did not expect to be or want to be selected as a vice presidential running mate, but was vetted for vice president by the Romney campaign. Former Romney aide Beth Myers has said that the vetting process turned up nothing disqualifying about Rubio. As a member of the Republican Party, he represented Florida in the United States Senate from 2011 to 2025 and a candidate during the 2016 Republican Party primary elections for president of the United States.

Upon taking office, Rubio hired Cesar Conda as his chief of staff. Conda, a former adviser to Vice President Dick Cheney, and former top aide to senators Spencer Abraham and Robert Kasten, was succeeded in 2014 as Rubio's chief of staff by his deputy, Alberto Martinez, but remained as a part-time adviser.

During his first year in office, Rubio became an influential defender of the United States embargo against Cuba and induced the State Department to withdraw an ambassadorial nomination of Jonathan D. Farrar, who was the Chief of Mission of the United States Interests Section in Havana from 2008 to 2011. Rubio believed that Farrar was not assertive enough toward the Castro regime. Also in 2011, Rubio was invited to visit the Reagan Library, during which he gave a well-publicized speech praising its namesake, and also rescued Nancy Reagan from falling.

In March 2011, Rubio supported U.S. participation in the military campaign in Libya to oust Libyan leader Muammar Gaddafi. He urged that Senate leaders bring "a bi-partisan resolution to the Senate floor authorizing the president's decision to participate in allied military action in Libya". The administration decided that no congressional authorization was needed under the War Powers Resolution; Senator Joe Lieberman (I-CT) joined Rubio in writing an opinion piece for The Wall Street Journal in June 2011 again urging passage of such authorization. In October 2011, Rubio joined several other senators in pushing for continued engagement to "help Libya lay the foundation for sustainable security". Soon after Gadhafi was ousted, Rubio warned there was a serious threat posed by the spread of militias and weapons, and called for more U.S. involvement to counter that threat.

Rubio voted against the Budget Control Act of 2011, which included mandatory automatic budget cuts from sequestration. He later said that defense spending should never have been linked to taxes and the deficit, calling the policy a "terrible idea" based on a "false choice".

The following month, Rubio and Senator Chris Coons, Democrat of Delaware, co-sponsored the American Growth, Recovery, Empowerment and Entrepreneurship Act (AGREE Act), which would have extended many tax credits and exemptions for businesses investing in research and development, equipment, and other capital; provided a tax credit for veterans who start a business franchise; allowed an increase in immigration for certain types of work visas; and strengthened copyright protections.

Rubio voted against the 2012 "fiscal cliff" resolutions. Although he received some criticism for this position, he responded: "Thousands of small businesses, not just the wealthy, will now be forced to decide how they'll pay this new tax, and, chances are, they'll do it by firing employees, cutting back their hours and benefits, or postponing the new hires they were looking to make. And to make matters worse, it does nothing to bring our dangerous debt under control."

==== 113th Congress (2013–2015) ====
In 2013, Rubio was part of the bipartisan "Gang of Eight" senators that crafted comprehensive immigration reform legislation. Rubio proposed a plan providing a path to citizenship for undocumented immigrants living in the U.S., involving payment of fines and back taxes, background checks, and a probationary period; that pathway was to be implemented only after strengthening border security. The bill passed the Senate 68 to 32 with his support, but Rubio then signaled that the bill should not be taken up by the House because other priorities, like repealing Obamacare, were a higher priority for him; the House never did take up the bill. Rubio has since explained that he still supports reform, but a different approach instead of a single comprehensive bill.

Rubio was chosen to deliver the Republican response to President Obama's 2013 State of the Union Address. It marked the first time the response was delivered in English and Spanish. Rubio's attempt to draw a strong line against the looming defense sequestration stood in contrast to fellow Republican senator Rand Paul's additional response to Obama's speech that called for the sequester to be carried out.

In April 2013, Rubio voted against an expansion of background checks for gun purchases, contending that such increased regulatory measures would do little to help capture criminals. Rubio voted against publishing the Senate Intelligence Committee report on CIA torture. In 2016, Rubio said the U.S. should "find out everything they know" from captured terrorists and should not telegraph "the enemy what interrogation techniques we will or won't use."

==== 114th Congress (2015–2017) ====
Republicans took control of the U.S. Senate as a result of the elections in November 2014. As this new period of Republican control began, Rubio pushed for the elimination of the "risk corridors" used by the federal government to compensate insurers for their losses as part of the Patient Protection and Affordable Care Act (PPACA). The risk corridors were intended to be funded by profitable insurers participating in the PPACA, but since insurer losses have significantly exceeded their profits in the program, the risk corridors have been depleted. His efforts contributed to the inclusion of a provision in the 2014 federal budget that prevented other funding sources from being tapped to replenish the risk corridors.

In March 2015, Rubio and Senator Mike Lee, Republican of Utah, proposed a tax plan that according to The Wall Street Journal, combined thinking from "old-fashioned, Reagan-era supply-siders" and a "breed of largely younger conservative reform thinkers" concerned with the tax burden on the middle class. The plan would lower the top corporate income tax rate from 38% to 25%, eliminate taxes on capital gains, dividends, and inherited estates, and create a new child tax credit worth up to $2,500 per child. The plan would set the top individual income tax rate at 35%. It also included a proposal to replace the means-tested welfare system, including food stamps and the Earned Income Tax Credit, with a new "consolidated system of benefits".

According to analysis by Vocativ as reported by Fox News, Rubio missed 8.3% of total votes from January 2011 to February 2015. From October 27, 2014, to October 26, 2015, Rubio voted in 74% of Senate votes, according to an analysis by GovTrack.us, which tracks congressional voting records. In 2015, Rubio was absent for about 35% of Senate votes. In historical context Rubio's attendance record for Senate votes is not exceptional among senators seeking a presidential nomination; John McCain missed a much higher percentage of votes in 2007. But it was the worst of the three senators who campaigned for the presidency in 2015.

During his Senate tenure, Rubio has co-sponsored bills on issues ranging from humanitarian crises in Haiti to the Russo-Ukrainian war, and was a frequent and prominent critic of Obama's efforts in national security.

On May 17, 2016, Rubio broke from the Republican majority in his support of Obama's request for $2 billion in emergency spending on the Zika virus at a time when Florida accounted for roughly 20% of the recorded cases of Zika in the U.S., acknowledging that it was the president's request but adding, "it's really the scientists' request, the doctors' request, the public health sector's request for how to address this issue." On August 6, Rubio said he did not believe in terminating Zika-infected pregnancies.

On December 13, after President-elect Trump nominated Rex Tillerson as his secretary of state in the incoming administration, Rubio expressed concern about the selection. On January 11, Rubio questioned Tillerson during a Senate committee hearing on his confirmation, saying afterward he would "do what's right". On January 23, Rubio said that he would vote to confirm Tillerson, saying that a delay in the appointment would be counter to national interests.

==== 115th Congress (2017–2019) ====
On April 5, 2017, Rubio said Bashar al-Assad felt he could act with "impunity" in knowing the United States was not prioritizing removing him from office. The next day, Rubio praised Trump's ordered strike: "By acting decisively against the very facility from which Assad launched his murderous chemical weapons attack, President Trump has made it clear to Assad and those who empower him that the days of committing war crimes with impunity are over."

In September 2017, Rubio defended Trump's decision to rescind the Deferred Action for Childhood Arrivals program. He called the program, which provided temporary stay for some undocumented immigrants brought into the U.S. as minors, "unconstitutional".

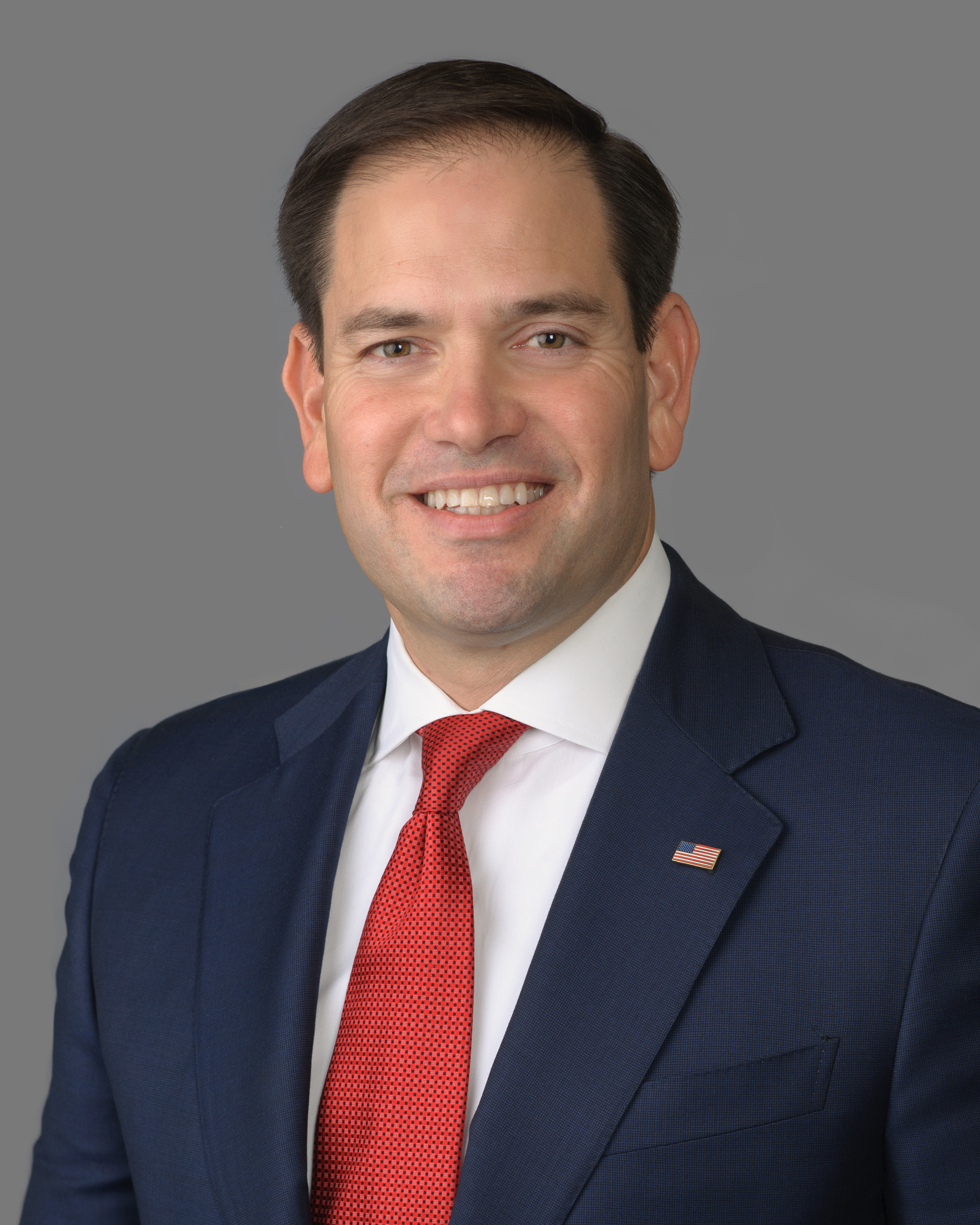
Official portrait, 2018

In the first session of the 115th United States Congress, Rubio was ranked the tenth most bipartisan senator by the Bipartisan Index, published by the Lugar Center and Georgetown's McCourt School of Public Policy.

While ballots were being counted in a close Florida Senate race between Democratic incumbent Bill Nelson and Republican challenger Rick Scott, Rubio claimed without evidence that Democrats were conspiring with election officials to illicitly install Nelson. He claimed without evidence that "Democrat lawyers" were descending on Florida and that "they have been very clear they aren't here to make sure every vote is counted." He claimed that Broward County officials were engaged in "ongoing" legal violations, without specifying what those were. Election monitors found no evidence of voter fraud in Broward County, and the Florida State Department found no evidence of criminal activity.

==== 116th Congress (2019–2021) ====
In 2019, Rubio defended Trump's decision to host the 46th G7 summit at the Trump National Doral Miami, a resort Trump owns. Rubio called the decision "great" and said it would be good for local businesses.

In 2020, Rubio supported Judy Shelton's nomination to the Federal Reserve board of governors. Shelton had received bipartisan criticism for her support of the gold standard and other unorthodox monetary policy views.

On July 13, 2020, the Chinese government sanctioned Rubio and three other U.S. politicians for "interfering in China's internal affairs" by condemning human rights abuses in Xinjiang. In response, Rubio tweeted: "Last month #China banned me. Today they sanctioned me. I don't want to be paranoid but I am starting to think they don't like me." On August 10, 2020, the Chinese government sanctioned Rubio and 10 other Americans for "behaving badly on Hong Kong-related issues".

After Biden defeated Trump in the 2020 presidential election and Trump made false claims of election fraud, Rubio defended Trump's right to assert claims of fraud and challenge the election results, saying any "irregularities" and "claims of broken election laws" could not be claimed false until the courts ruled on them. Rubio later shifted his rhetoric to saying that concerns from Republican voters over "potential irregularities" in the election demanded redress. By November 23, 2020, Rubio referred to Biden as president-elect.

==== 117th Congress (2021–2023) ====
Rubio described the 2021 United States Capitol attack as unpatriotic and "3rd world-style anti-American anarchy". Of the rioters, Rubio said some of them were adherents "to a conspiracy theory and others got caught up in the moment. The result was a national embarrassment." After Congress was allowed to return to session, Rubio voted to certify the 2021 United States Electoral College vote count. In February 2021, Rubio voted to acquit Trump for his role in inciting the mob to storm the Capitol. On May 28, 2021, Rubio voted against creating the January 6 commission.

In January 2021, Rubio sponsored the Uyghur Forced Labor Prevention Act. In May 2021, Rubio argued that "Wall Street must stop enabling Communist China" in The American Prospect and on his website. "Americans from across the political spectrum should feel emboldened by the growing bipartisan awakening to the threat that the CCP poses to American workers, families, and communities", he wrote. "As we deploy legislative solutions to tackle this challenge, Democrats must not allow our corporate and financial sectors' leftward shift on social issues to blind them to the enormity of China as a geo-economic threat."

Rubio denounced the Russian invasion of Ukraine in 2022 and co-sponsored a bill that would target pro-Russian separatist groups whose conflict with the Ukrainian government was used by Vladimir Putin to justify the invasion.

==== 118th Congress (2023–2025) ====
In 2023 and 2024, Rubio introduced 270 bills and resolutions, including the Make America Active Again Act, Patriotic Investment Act, and the Preventing Antisemitic Harassment on Campus Act. This was the most by any U.S. senator during the 118th Congress.

The National Taxpayers Union (NTU), which tracks voting records related to taxes, spending, debt, and regulations, gave Rubio an 87% rating. In 2023, the NTU noted Rubio's past opposition to tariffs. As of 2026, Rubio was the longest-serving Republican senator from Florida.

=== Committee assignments ===
As of 2021, Rubio's committee memberships were as follows:

- Committee on Appropriations
  - Subcommittee on Financial Services and General Government
  - Subcommittee on Labor, Health and Human Services, Education, and Related Agencies
  - Subcommittee on the Legislative Branch
  - Subcommittee on Military Construction, Veterans Affairs, and Related Agencies
  - Subcommittee on State, Foreign Operations, and Related Programs
- Committee on Small Business and Entrepreneurship
- Select Committee on Intelligence (Ranking Member)
- Committee on Foreign Relations
  - Subcommittee on Western Hemisphere, Transnational Crime, Civilian Security, Democracy, Human Rights, and Global Women's Issues (Ranking Member)
  - Subcommittee on East Asia, the Pacific, and International Cybersecurity Policy
  - Subcommittee on State Department and USAID Management, International Operations, and Bilateral International Development
- Special Committee on Aging

=== Caucuses ===
- Senate Republican Conference

== 2016 presidential campaign ==
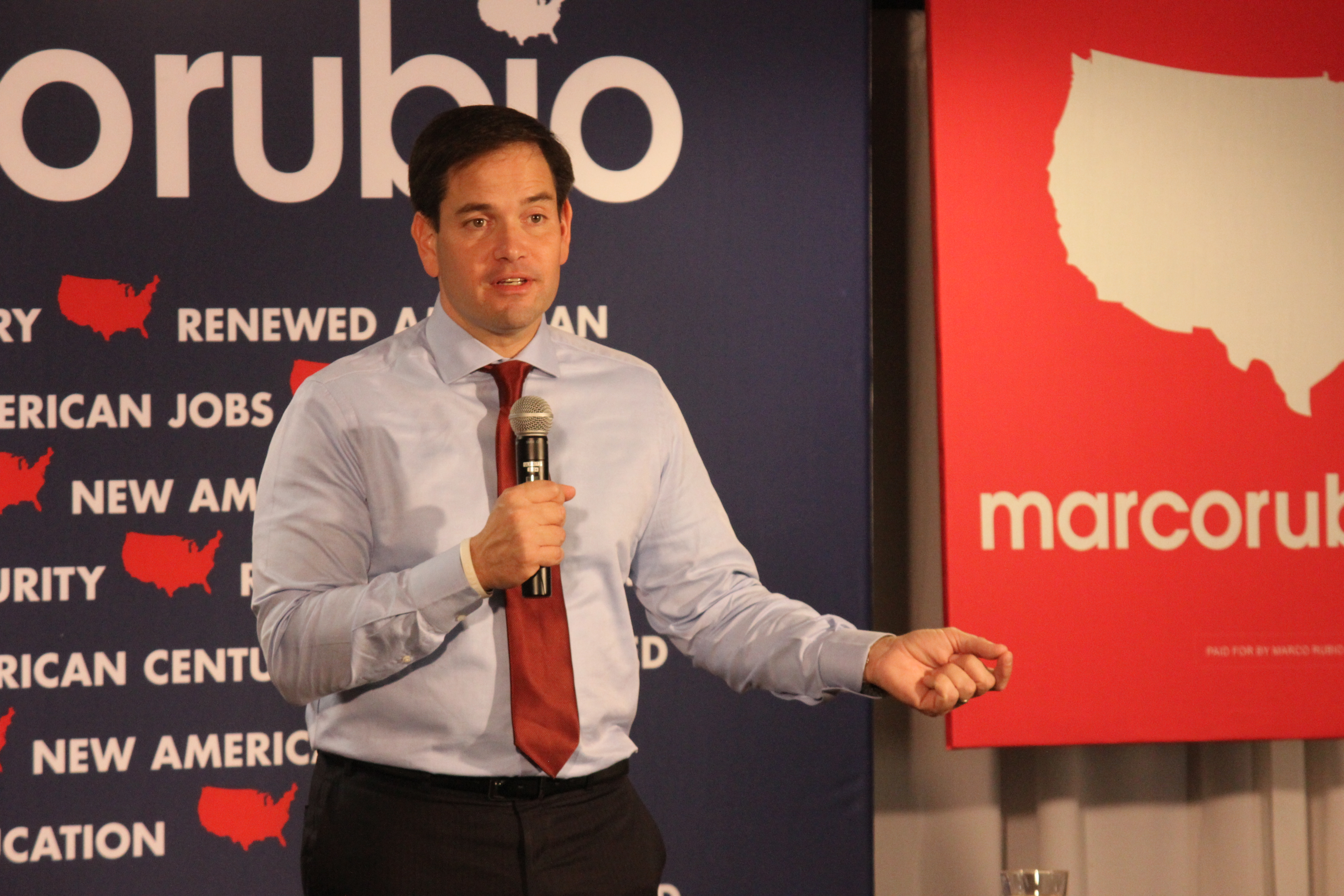
Rubio campaigning for president in November 2015

In April 2014, Rubio said he would not run for reelection to the Senate if he ran for president in 2016, as Florida law prohibits a candidate from appearing twice on a ballot, but he did not rule out running for either office. He later said that even if he ran for the Republican nomination for president and lost, he would not run for reelection to the Senate. Also in April 2014, the departure of Cesar Conda, Rubio's chief of staff since 2011, was seen as a sign of Rubio's plans to run for president in 2016. Conda departed to lead Rubio's Reclaim America PAC as a senior adviser. Groups supporting Rubio raised over $530,000 in the first three months of 2014, most of which was spent on consultants and data analytics, in what was seen as preparation for a presidential campaign.

A WMUR/University poll tracking New Hampshire's Republican primary voters' sentiment showed Rubio at the top alongside Kentucky senator Rand Paul later in 2013, but as of April 18, 2014, he had dropped to 10th place behind other Republican contenders. The poll suggested that Rubio was not disliked by the primary voters, which was thought to be good for him if other candidates had chosen not to run. He placed second among potential 2016 Republican presidential candidates in an online poll of likely voters conducted by Zogby Analytics in January 2015.

In January 2015, it was reported that Rubio had begun contacting top donors and appointing advisors for a potential 2016 run, including George Seay, who previously worked on such campaigns as Rick Perry's in 2012 and Mitt Romney's in 2008, and Jim Rubright, who had previously worked for Jeb Bush, Mitt Romney, and John McCain. Rubio also instructed his aides to "prepare for a presidential campaign" prior to a Team Marco 2016 fundraising meeting in South Beach.

On April 13, 2015, Rubio launched his campaign for president in 2016. Rubio was believed to be a viable candidate for the 2016 presidential race who could attract many parts of the GOP base, partly because of his youthfulness and oratorical skill. Rubio had pitched his candidacy as an effort to restore the American Dream for middle and working-class families, who might have found his background as a working-class Cuban-American appealing.

=== Republican primaries ===
In the first Republican primary, the February 1 Iowa caucuses, Rubio finished third, behind candidates Ted Cruz and Donald Trump. During a nationally televised debate among Republican candidates in New Hampshire on February 6, 2016, Rubio was criticized by rival Chris Christie for speaking repetitiously, with Christie saying Rubio sounded "scripted". On February 9, when he placed fifth in the New Hampshire primary results, Rubio took the blame and acknowledged a poor debate performance. In the third Republican contest, the South Carolina primary on February 20, Rubio finished second, but did not gain any delegates as Trump won all of South Carolina's congressional districts and thus delegates. Jeb Bush left the race that day, leading to a surge in campaign donations and endorsements to Rubio. On February 23, Rubio finished second in the Nevada caucuses, again losing to Trump. Trump called Rubio's remarks at the February 25 debate "robotic" due to Rubio's repeated use of the same talking points; Rubio was later followed by hecklers who were dressed as robots.

At another Republican debate on February 25, Rubio repeatedly criticized frontrunner candidate Donald Trump. It was described by CNN as a "turning point in style" as Rubio had previously largely ignored Trump during his campaign, and this deviated from Rubio's signature "optimistic campaign message". The next day Rubio continued turning Trump's attacks against him, even ridiculing Trump's physical appearance. On March 1, called 'Super Tuesday' with eleven Republican contests on that day, Rubio's sole victory was in Minnesota, the first state he had won since voting began a month prior. Rubio went on to win further contests in Puerto Rico on March 6 and the District of Columbia on March 12, but lost eight other contests from March 5 to 8. Around that time, Rubio revealed he was not "entirely proud" of his personal attacks on Trump.

On March 15, Rubio suspended his campaign after placing second in his own home state of Florida. Hours earlier, Rubio had expressed expectations for a Florida win, and said he would continue to campaign (in Utah) "irrespective of" that night's results. The result was that Rubio won 27.0% of the Florida vote, while Trump won 45.7% and all of Florida's delegates. The conclusion of the six March 15 contests (out of which Rubio won none) left Rubio with 169 delegates on the race to reach 1237, but Ted Cruz already had 411 and Trump 673. On March 17, Rubio ruled out runs for the vice-presidency, governorship of Florida and even reelection for his senate seat. He said only that he would be a "private citizen" by January 2017, leading to some media speculation of the termination of his political career. (Rubio later reversed his decision and was reelected to the Senate.)

=== After candidacy ===
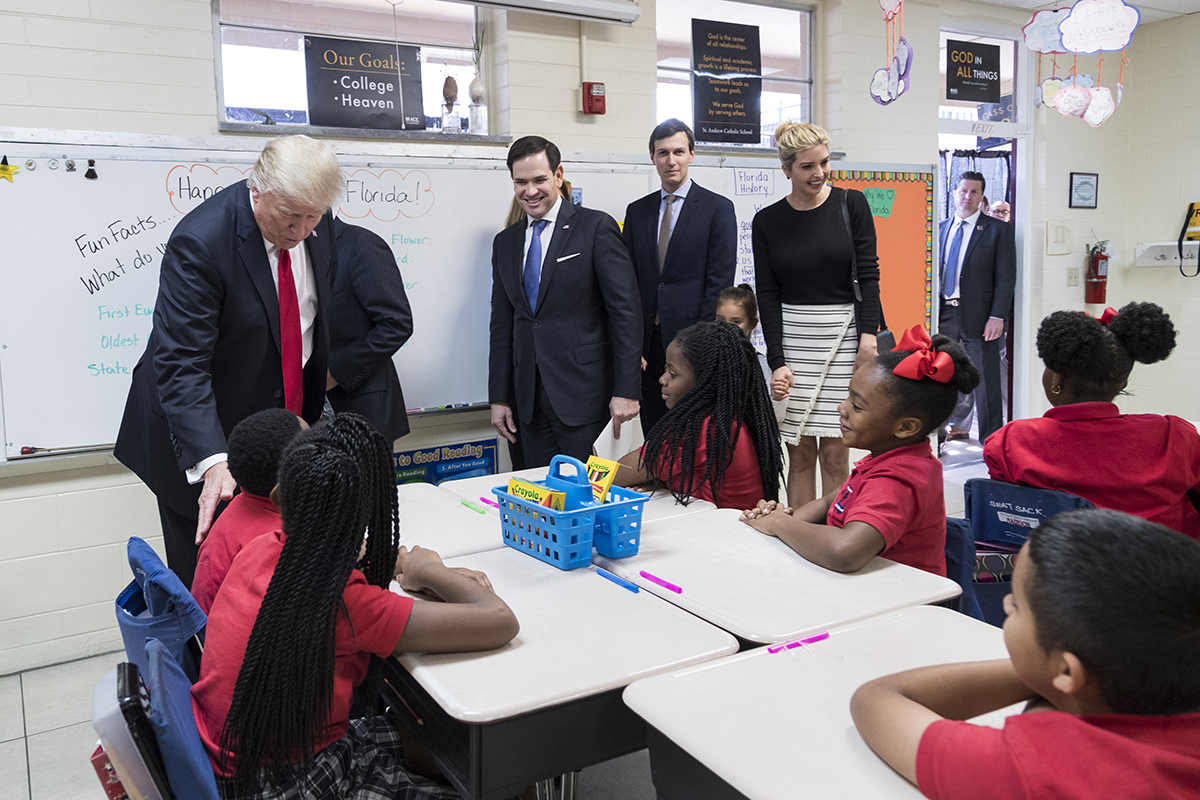
Rubio and President Donald Trump visiting a fourth-grade classroom in Orlando, Florida on March 3, 2017

On April 12, during an interview with Mark Levin, Rubio expressed his wishes that Republicans would nominate a conservative candidate, name-dropping Cruz. This was interpreted as an endorsement of Cruz, though Rubio clarified the following day that he had only been answering a question. Rubio would later explain his decision to not endorse Cruz being due to his belief that the endorsement would not significantly benefit him and a desire to let the election cycle play out. On April 22, Rubio said he was not interested in being the vice presidential candidate to any of the remaining GOP contenders. On May 16, Rubio posted several tweets in which he critiqued sources reporting that he despised the Senate and a Washington Post story that claimed he was unsure of his next move after his unsuccessful presidential bid, typing, "I have only said like 10000 times I will be a private citizen in January."

On May 18, after Trump expressed a willingness to meet with Kim Jong-un, Rubio said Kim was "not a stable person" and furthered that Trump was open to the meeting only due to inexperience with the North Korea leader. On May 26, Rubio told reporters that he was backing Trump due to his view that the presumptive nominee was a better choice than Hillary Clinton for the presidency and that as president, Trump would sign a repeal of the Affordable Care Act and replace the late Antonin Scalia with another conservative Supreme Court Justice. He also confirmed that he would be attending the 2016 Republican National Convention in Cleveland, Ohio, where he intended to release his pledged delegates to support Trump. On May 29, Rubio continued disavowing vice presidential speculation but indicated an interest in playing a role in Trump's campaign. On June 6, Rubio rebuked Trump's comments on Gonzalo P. Curiel, who Trump accused of being biased against him on the basis of his ethnicity, as "offensive" while speaking with reporters, advising that Trump should cease defending the remarks and defending the judge as "an American". Rubio restarted his Senate reelection campaign on June 22.

On July 6, Olivia Perez-Cubas, Rubio's Senate campaign spokeswoman, said he would not be attending the Republican National Convention due to planned campaigning on the days the convention was scheduled to take place.

During the Republican primary campaign in which Rubio and Donald Trump were opponents, Rubio criticized Trump, including, in February 2016, calling Trump a "con artist" and saying that Trump is "wholly unprepared to be president of the United States". In June 2016, after Trump became the presumptive GOP nominee, Rubio reaffirmed his February 2016 comments that we must not hand "the nuclear codes of the United States to an erratic individual". However, after Trump won the Republican Party's nomination, Rubio endorsed him on July 20, 2016. Following the October 7, 2016, Donald Trump Access Hollywood controversy, Rubio wrote that "Donald's comments were vulgar, egregious & impossible to justify. No one should ever talk about any woman in those terms, even in private." Rubio reaffirmed his support of Trump shortly thereafter. Two weeks later, at the annual Calle Orange street festival in downtown Orlando, he was booed off a stage by a mostly Hispanic crowd over his support for Trump.

== Secretary of State (2025–present) ==
=== Nomination and confirmation ===
In November 2024, it was reported that Trump had chosen Rubio as United States secretary of state in his second administration; Trump confirmed this on November 13. Unlike many of Trump's other cabinet nominations, Rubio's attracted little controversy. He was praised by both Republicans and Democrats. Rubio appeared before the Senate Committee on Foreign Relations on January 15, 2025. During the hearing, he called China "the most potent and dangerous near-peer adversary this nation has ever faced" and said the Chinese Communist Party had "lied, cheated, hacked, and stolen their way to global superpower status at our expense".

Trump formally nominated Rubio, among others, on January 20, 2025, as one of his first acts as president. The Senate Committee on Foreign Relations unanimously approved his nomination and the Senate confirmed him a few hours later by a vote of 99 to 0.

=== Tenure ===
Vice President JD Vance swears in Marco Rubio as secretary of state on January 21, 2025

On January 21, 2025, Vice President JD Vance swore Rubio into office as the 72nd secretary of state. During his tenure as secretary of state, Rubio has served in an acting capacity as national security advisor, the administrator of USAID and archivist of the United States, leading to him being dubbed the "Secretary of Everything" by The New York Times.

Rubio is the first Hispanic to hold the office of secretary of state. Rubio became the first Hispanic to act as National Security Advisor on May 1, 2025, after Trump announced his intention to replace national security advisor Mike Waltz with Rubio. Rubio became the interim national security advisor while continuing as secretary of state. On September 22, 2026, he became National Security Advisor in a permanent capacity. Rubio is the first person to be both secretary of state and national security advisor since Henry Kissinger in 1975. He is also the first Floridian to serve as secretary of state.

==== Indo-Pacific region ====
On his first day as secretary, Rubio met with foreign ministers of the Quadrilateral Security Dialogue member countries to "strengthen economic opportunity and peace and security in the Indo-Pacific region" and counter the influence of China.

==== Gender on passports ====
On January 23, 2025, as part of compliance with Executive Order 14168, which ended gender self-identification on passports, Rubio instructed State Department staff to freeze any passport applications that requested "X" sex markers. As part of the move, the department held some transgender applicants' documents while their applications were in limbo. The move created widespread confusion among both applicants and those who had already acquired passports with "X" sex markers. The Williams Institute estimated that, out of the 171 million Americans who hold valid U.S. passports, 16,700 may be eligible for ones with "X" sex markers.

==== USAID ====
===== 90-day freeze =====
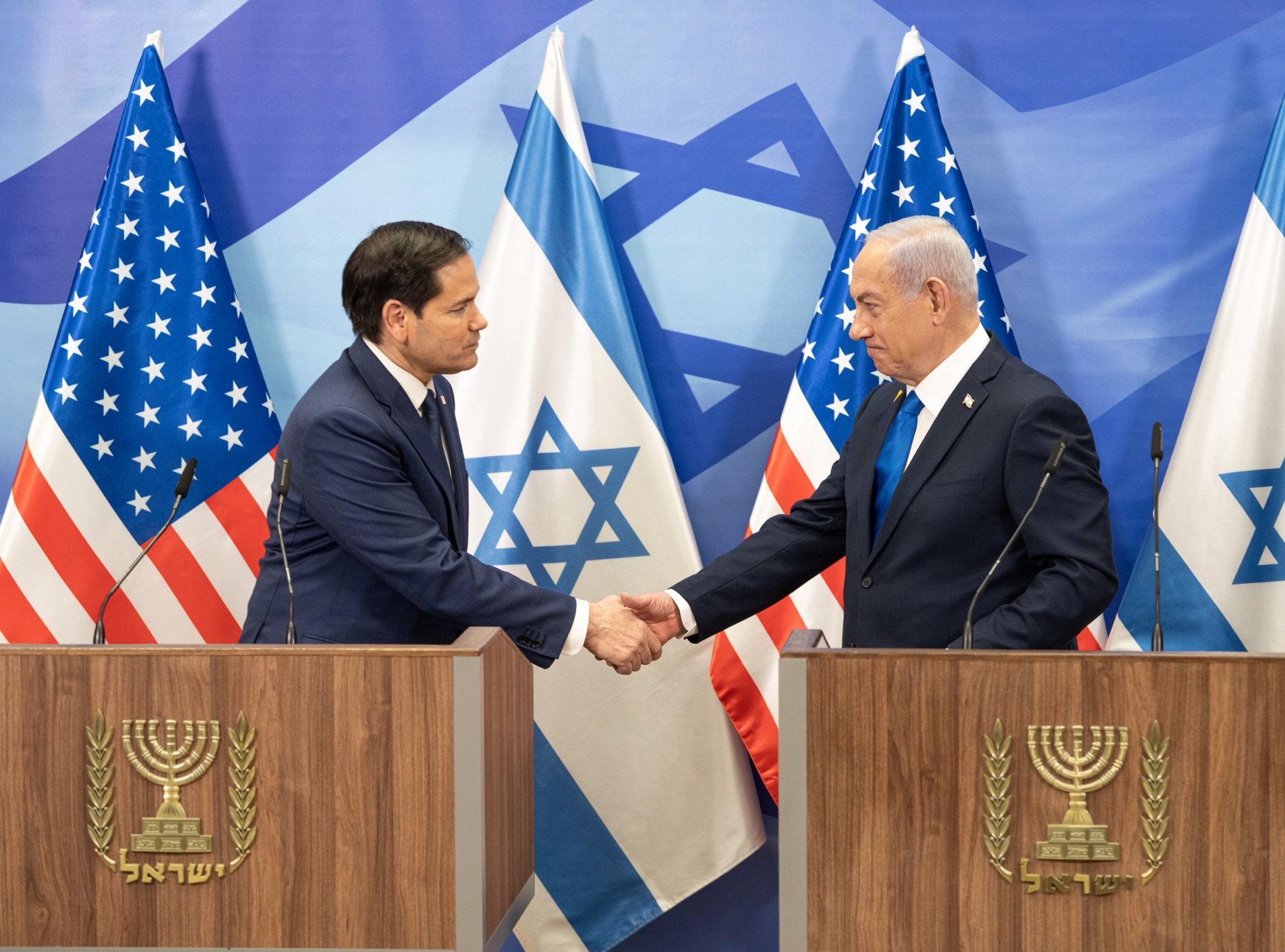
Rubio with Israeli Prime Minister Benjamin Netanyahu in Jerusalem on February 16, 2025

In accordance with President Trump's executive order, on January 24, 2025, Rubio enacted an unprecedented freeze on all U.S. foreign aid for 90 days, with some exceptions, effective January 28. This shut down many of USAID's humanitarian, development, and security programs worldwide. During his time in Congress, Rubio was an avid supporter of USAID. During a February 6 press conference in the Dominican Republic, Rubio said, "If it's providing food or medicine or anything that is saving lives and is immediate and urgent, you're not included in the freeze." But on February 8, CNN reported that many waivers were not being acted upon because too many staff have been placed on leave and because payment systems had been taken over.

In March, ProPublica reported that emails show that Rubio was alerted by longtime employees who estimated that one million children would go untreated for severe malnutrition, up to 166,000 people would die from malaria, and 200,000 children would be paralyzed by polio over the next decade if the USAID programs were cut.

Despite assurances from the Trump administration that critical foreign assistance programs would be protected, the restructuring of USAID by the Department of Government Efficiency (DOGE) in early 2025 resulted in significant operational disruption. During late February and early March, the cessation of access to financial systems severely hindered USAID's ability to process payments. At a February 13 meeting, three political appointees shouted at a regular employee to draft a memo countering the "false narrative" in the media that there had ever been a pause. On February 24, employees were told not to bother requesting waivers for infectious diseases such as Ebola because they would not be approved. On February 26, about 10,000 programs were abruptly ended. Meanwhile, payment of $2 billion for work already completed was slowed.

At times, the Trump administration seemed to be "trying to reverse-engineer its most sweeping actions" in order to restore lifesaving programs. But when appealed to by an employee, political appointee Joel Borkert said some were canceled in error, and wrote in an email, "we have the ability to rescind."

===== Downsizing =====
On March 10, Rubio posted to X that the administration would be keeping only 17% of USAID programs.

===== July 2025 clawbacks =====
In June 2025, the White House requested that Congress pass a package of rescissions, or "clawbacks", of approximately $8 billion in foreign aid and $1 billion for the Corporation for Public Broadcasting. The House of Representatives passed the cuts as requested. The Senate excluded the cuts to PEPFAR, the program started under President George W. Bush to help lower-income countries get access to HIV medicines. The Senate passed two preliminary votes, 51–50, with Vice-president JD Vance casting the tie-breaking votes. A rescission is one of the exceptions to the Senate's 60-vote filibuster rule.

On July 17, the Senate voted 51–48 in favor of the cuts. The next day, the House of Representatives voted 216-213 for the Senate version, meaning PEPFAR was protected.

==== Disaster relief ====
===== Hurricane Melissa =====
Hurricane Melissa was a Category 5 hurricane that first made landfall at Jamaica on October 28, 2025, and then hit other Caribbean islands. Rubio activated a disaster assistance response team that was on the ground in Jamaica within several days. By October 31, three U.S. CH-47 Chinook helicopters were deployed to Jamaica to help with relief efforts, with five more helicopters on the way.

In early November, the State Department promised $12 million in aid to Jamaica, $8 million to Haiti, $3 million to Cuba, and $500,000 to The Bahamas. The State Department's Tommy Pigott said, "The State Department's response to Hurricane Melissa demonstrates that the new foreign assistance model is not only capable of responding to emergencies, but that it allows for relief efforts that are informed by the State Department's regional experts and integrated with the State Department's broader foreign policy."

==== First trip abroad ====
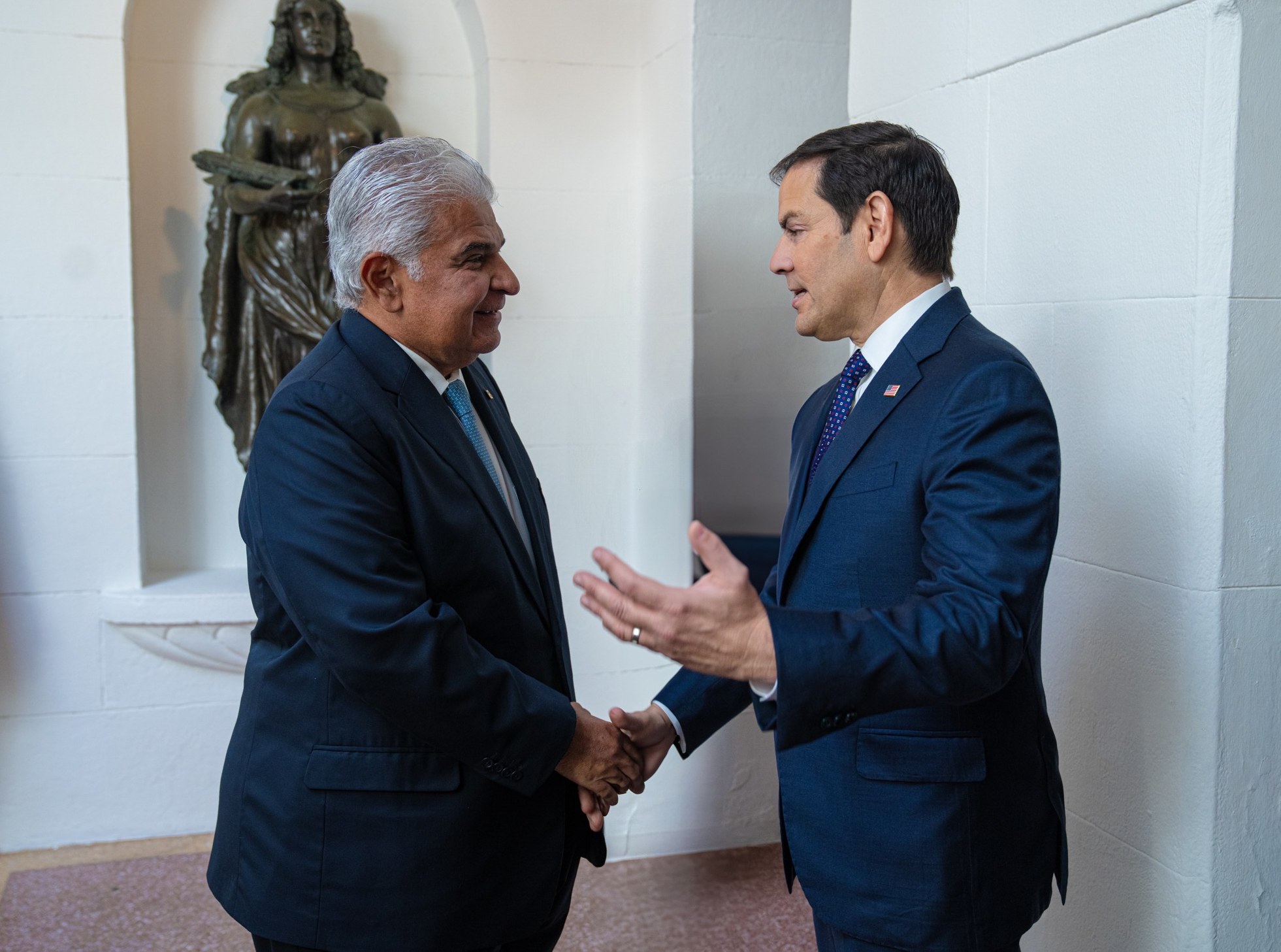
Rubio with Panamanian President José Raúl Mulino in Panama City, Panama on February 2, 2025

In his first trip abroad as secretary of state, Rubio traveled to Panama, Guatemala, El Salvador, Costa Rica, and the Dominican Republic. The trip was intended to address curtailing illegal migration and Trump's push to reclaim the Panama Canal. On January 30, Rubio stated that it was in U.S. "national interest" to acquire Greenland and did not rule out military coercion to do so.

==== Deported persons in El Salvador ====
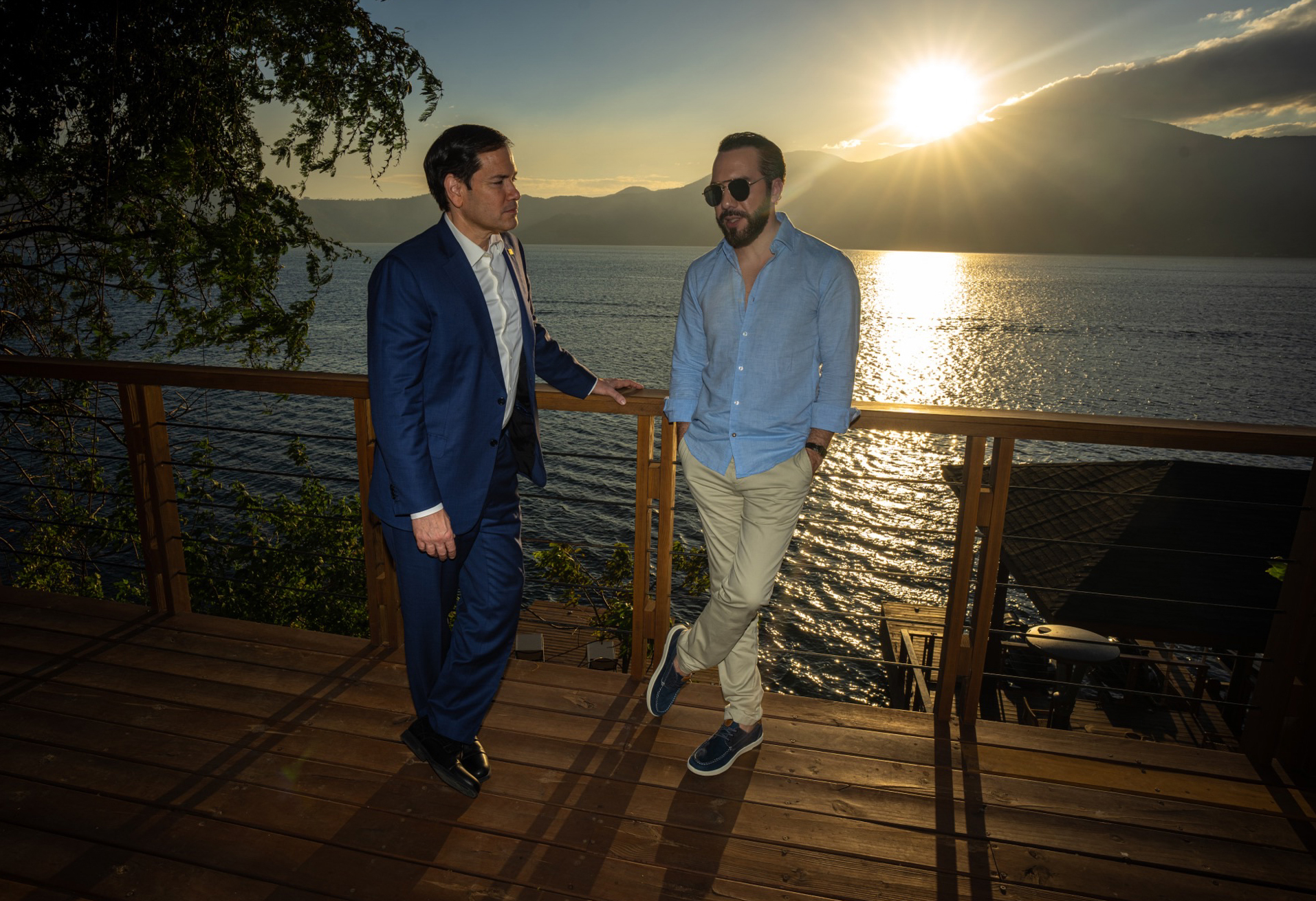
Rubio with Nayib Bukele in 2025

In February 2025, Rubio met with El Salvador president Nayib Bukele and reached an agreement for the country to take in deported foreign nationals who committed crimes, in addition to jailed U.S. citizens and permanent residents. Rubio praised the agreement as a way of rehousing deportees and American prisoners in the Salvadoran Terrorism Confinement Center. According to The Washington Post, Rubio promised Bukele that Attorney General Pam Bondi would terminate protection agreements between the US and "informants" on Bukele's alleged relationship with MS-13.

==== Archivist of the U.S. ====
On February 6, 2025, ABC News reported that Rubio had been the acting archivist of the United States since Trump took office. Later reporting by 404 Media said that this reporting was misunderstanding, faulty, or a "bad news source" quoting an unnamed National Archives and Records Administration employee, and noted that Colleen Shogan was still listed as Archivist of the United States. But after the removal of Shogan and deputy archivist William J. Bosanko, Rubio became acting archivist of the United States on February 16. 300 days later, to comply with the Vacancies Reform Act, he gave up the role on February 4, 2026; no immediate successor was appointed, though "authority" was delegated to Jim Byron, his senior advisor.

==== Gaza and West Bank ====
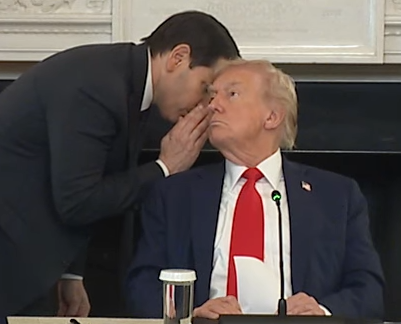
Rubio briefing Trump that Israel and Hamas have signed off on the September 2025 peace deal on October 8, 2025

In February 2025, Rubio supported Trump's proposal that the U.S. take over the Gaza Strip, saying that the U.S. "stands ready to lead and Make Gaza Beautiful Again" and pursues a lasting peace in the region for all people. In March 2025, Rubio bypassed Congress by issuing an emergency declaration to send Israel a $4 billion shipment of arms.

On May 16, 2025, while in Abu Dhabi, UAE, Trump said: "We're looking at Gaza. And we're going to get that taken care of. A lot of people are starving." Israel claims that Hamas systemically raids food aid in order to support its operations, and Israel has put forward a plan of food distributed through a system of hubs run by private contractors and protected by Israeli soldiers. The U.S.-backed Gaza Humanitarian Foundation has been set up to carry out this plan and announced it would be ready to begin operations by the end of May. This plan has been criticized as unworkable and potentially unlawful because it could lead to mass forced relocations. On May 15, 2025, Rubio acknowledged the criticism and said the U.S. government is "open to an alternative if someone has a better one".

In October 2025, the Knesset passed a bill that would apply Israeli sovereignty to all West Bank settlements. Rubio called the bill "counterproductive" to Trump's Gaza peace plan.

==== Ukraine ====
On February 16, 2025, Rubio rejected concerns that Ukraine and Europe would be excluded from any future peace negotiations in the Russian invasion of Ukraine, saying, "One phone call does not solve a war as complex as this one, but I can tell you that Donald Trump is the only leader in the world that could potentially begin that process." On February 18, American and Russian delegations headed by Rubio and Russian Foreign Minister Sergey Lavrov met in Riyadh, Saudi Arabia, to develop a framework for further peace negotiations on the Ukraine war. Rubio was accompanied by U.S. national security advisor Mike Waltz and Special Envoy Steve Witkoff.

In October 2025, Rubio and Lavrov began holding discussions in preparation for the 2025 Budapest Summit between Donald Trump and Vladimir Putin. The summit was eventually canceled.

==== Disagreement with Elon Musk ====
On March 7, 2025, The New York Times reported that Rubio had clashed with Elon Musk during a White House cabinet meeting. Musk criticized him for not firing anyone in the State Department, and Rubio was angered by Musk's dismantling of USAID while he was the agency's administrator.

==== Syria ====
On March 9, 2025, Rubio condemned the massacres of Syrian minorities committed by pro-government fighters during clashes in western Syria. He said "the United States stands with Syria's religious and ethnic minorities, including its Christian, Druze, Alawite, and Kurdish communities" and that the "perpetrators of these massacres against Syria's minority communities" should be held accountable.

==== South Africa ====
On March 14, 2025, Rubio expelled the South African ambassador to the United States, Ebrahim Rasool, and called him a "race-baiting politician who hates America".

==== Foreign information and manipulation ====
In April 2025, Rubio announced that the State Department's Counter Foreign Information and Manipulation and Interference Office would be shut down, saying it had wasted millions of dollars and engaged in censorship.

==== Plans to trim costs and jobs ====
In late April 2025, Rubio announced plans to trim State Department costs and jobs by 15% to 17%. The same day, a senior State Department official said the job cuts would be 22%. Rubio said: "Over the past 15 years, the department's footprint has had unprecedented growth and costs have soared. But far from seeing a return on investment, taxpayers have seen less effective and efficient diplomacy. The sprawling bureaucracy created a system more beholden to radical political ideology than advancing America's core national interests." The proposal would fire 80% of staff in the Bureau of Democracy, Human Rights, and Labor.

==== China ====
In May 2025, Rubio announced the U.S. government would "aggressively revoke visas for Chinese students, including those with connections to the Chinese Communist Party or studying in critical fields". He also announced the U.S. would increase scrutiny of all future visa applications from China and Hong Kong.

In November 2026, The New York Times reported that Rubio had drafted a highly classified memo in spring 2026 warning of Nvidia CEO Jensen Huang's relationship with Alice Huang that was circulated to government officials with high-level security clearances before Trump's May 2026 visit to China, which Jensen Huang joined. CNN subsequently reported that the U.S. Intelligence Community had intercepted communications that an executive of Megaspeed was having an affair with a U.S. person, leading U.S. officials to unmask Jensen Huang. Rubio subsequently drafted a memo that was relayed to very few White House senior officials. It also reported Rubio had briefed Trump on the issue on several occasions, including verbally in May 2026 aboard Air Force One, when they were traveling to Alaska as a stopover before Trump's state visit to China. On November 14, The Washington Post reported that Rubio had written a memo warning Trump about Jensen Huang's relationship with Alice Huang based on a report generated by the Central Intelligence Agency (CIA); the Post reported that Rubio "used the CIA report to write his own, recasting the agency's reporting in his own more assertive terms".

==== International Criminal Court ====
In June 2025, Rubio announced sanctions against four judges of the International Criminal Court (ICC) in retaliation for the court's issuance of arrest warrants for Israeli prime minister Benjamin Netanyahu and former defence minister Yoav Gallant, and for an earlier decision to open an investigation into alleged war crimes by United States personnel in Afghanistan.

In July 2026, Rubio announced a broader campaign to dismantle the ICC "brick by brick" and systematically prevent it from investigating and prosecuting US officials and service members. Measures under consideration included travel bans, visa revocations, additional sanctions against the ICC and affiliated organizations, and diplomatic pressure on other countries to withdraw from the ICC or reject its asserted authority to prosecute Americans.

==== Iran ====
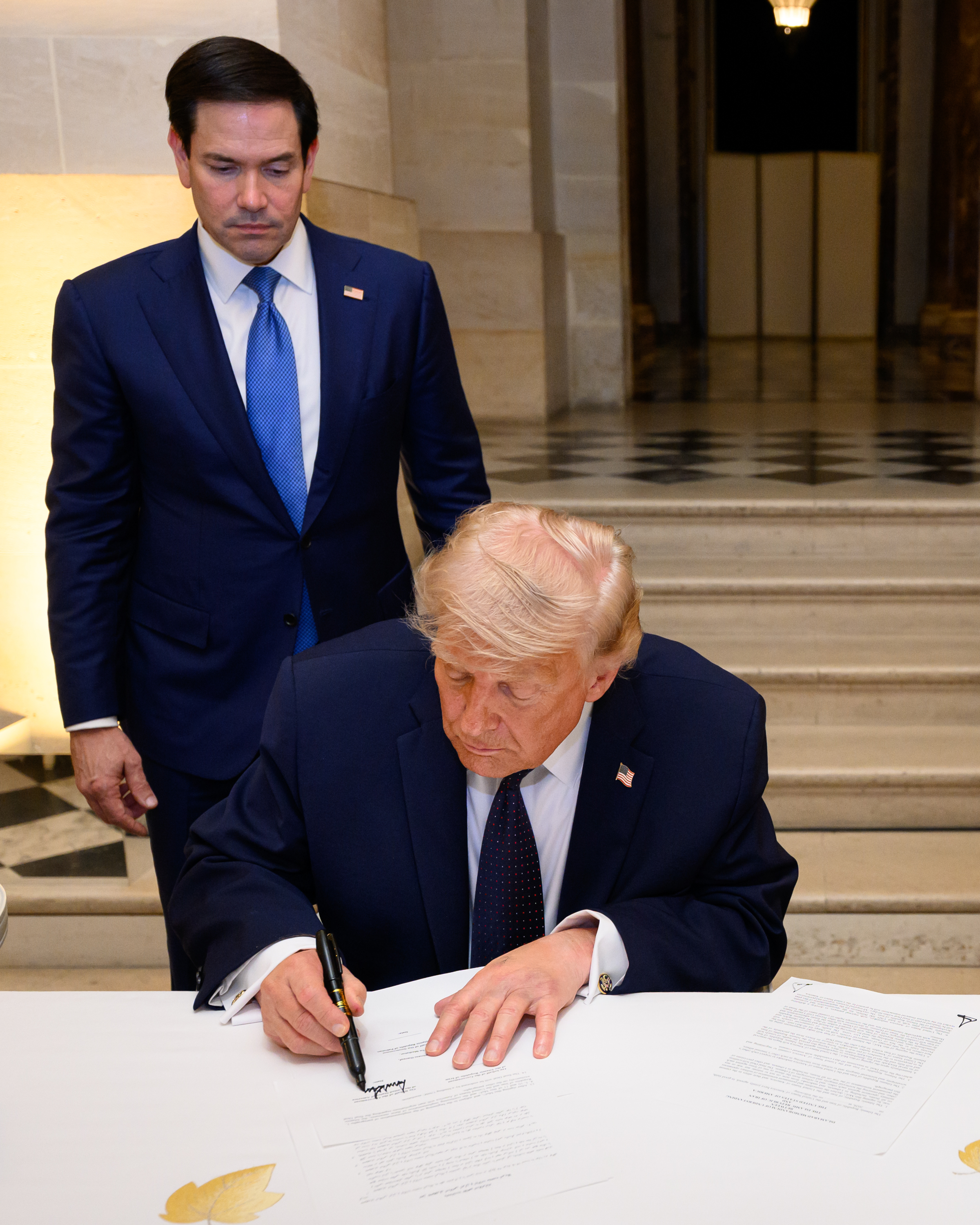
Rubio watching President Trump sign the Iran Memorandum of Understanding to end the 2026 Iran war on June 17, 2026

In June 2025, Rubio defended the direct U.S. strikes on Iranian nuclear sites known as Operation Midnight Hammer, which followed a previous wave of Israeli attacks. In January 2026, he expressed strong support for the anti-government protests in Iran.

During the 2026 Iran war, Rubio said the U.S. government knew that Israel was planning to attack Iran and that the U.S. did a preventive attack to avoid higher casualties. Critics of Israel denounced this as US strategy shaped by Israeli military decisions. Rubio also said the world will be a safer place when the military operation is completed. He said Iran's leadership is the problem, not its people, and that he hoped that the government would fall, but if not, the war's goals were to degrade Iranian military capabilities and ensure that Iran will not control the Strait of Hormuz.

==== Democratic Republic of the Congo and Rwanda ====
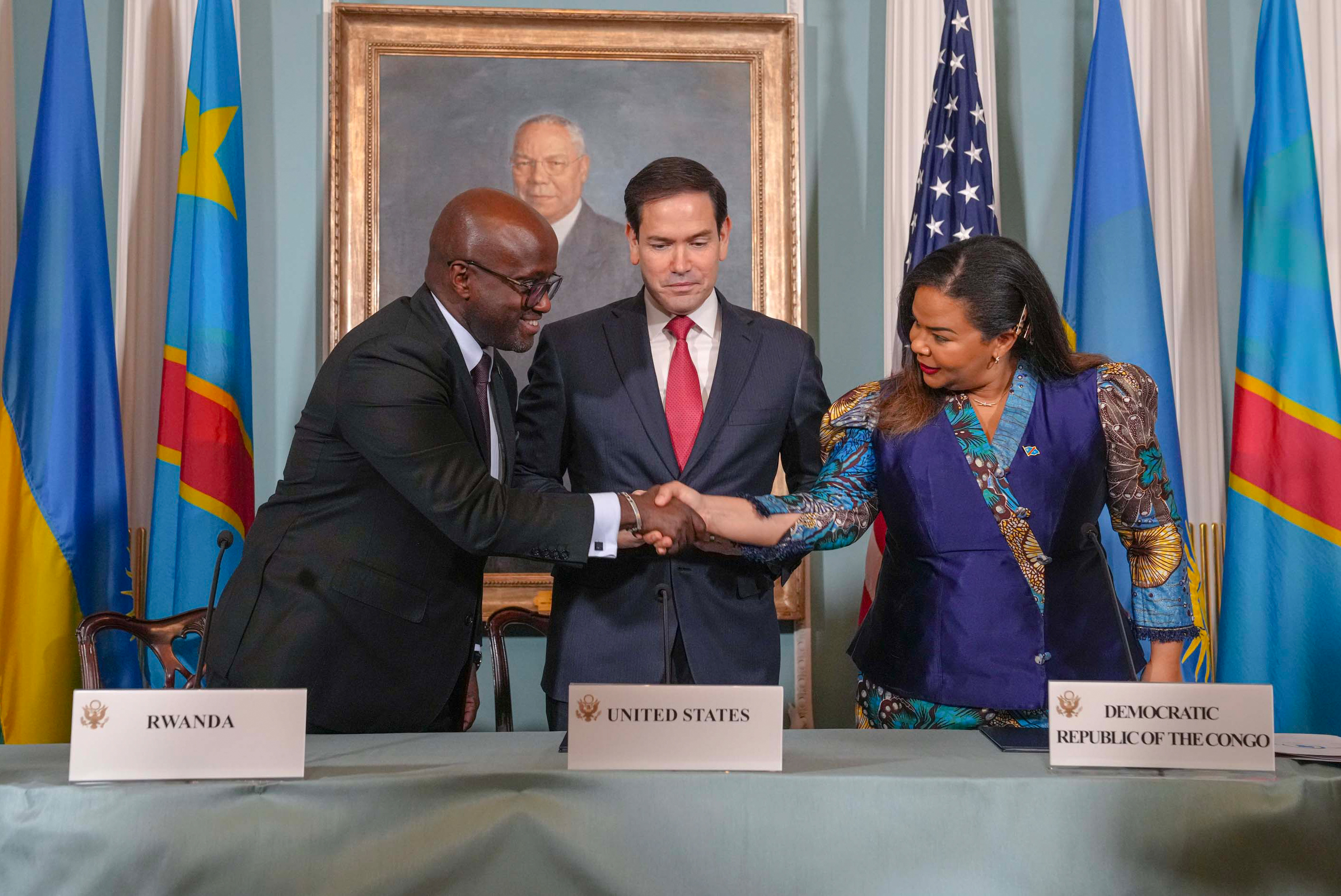
Rubio at the signing ceremony for the 2025 Democratic Republic of the Congo–Rwanda peace agreement on June 27, 2025

On June 27, 2025, Rubio hosted a peace agreement between the Democratic Republic of the Congo and Rwanda, according to which Rwanda will withdraw soldiers from the eastern DRC and the two countries will launch a framework for economic integration within 90 days. President Trump announced there will be deals with the West for minerals such as tantalum, gold, cobalt, copper, and lithium. A critic said, "Minerals are only one driver of conflict."

This agreement potentially ends a long-running conflict in which six million people have died. Rubio said: "This is an important moment after 30 years of war. President Trump is a president of peace. He really does want peace. He prioritizes it above all else." Former DRC president Joseph Kabila expressed skepticism of the peace deal, saying it was "nothing more than a trade agreement".

==== Mexico ====
In early September 2025, Rubio met with Mexican president Claudia Sheinbaum and Foreign Affairs Secretary Ramón de la Fuente during his third visit to Latin America. The U.S. and Mexico agreed to continue close cooperation regarding the smuggling of drugs from Mexico into the U.S. and the smuggling of guns from the U.S. into Mexico. Rubio said, "It's the closest cooperation we've ever had, maybe between any country, but definitely between the U.S. and Mexico."

==== Sudan ====
In November 2025, Rubio called for international action to stop the flow of weapons to the Rapid Support Forces (RSF), the paramilitary group responsible for mass killings and atrocities in El Fasher and across Sudan's Darfur region. He emphasized that the U.S. knew which countries were involved in supplying the RSF and using their territories for transit, and that pressure was being applied at the highest levels to stop it. Various sources, including the Sudanese army and U.N. investigators, have accused the United Arab Emirates (UAE) of being the RSF's main foreign backer.

==== Venezuela ====
On January 3, 2026, the U.S. launched airstrikes in Venezuela and captured Venezuelan President Nicolás Maduro and his wife. CNN called Rubio the "driving force of the strategy" of the operation. President Trump has said that Rubio will be among the officials responsible for the power transition in Venezuela after Maduro's ouster. According to The New York Times, Venezuela has been a de facto puppet state since the intervention, with the US State Department under Rubio controlling core aspects of Venezuela's governance, including its domestic finances, government appointments, revenues, foreign policy, and the distribution of its natural resources. Rubio has been dubbed Venezuela's "viceroy" by other US officials, and has been in regular contact with the country's acting president, Delcy Rodríguez. Rubio signed the administration's Venezuela oil deal.

==== Cuba ====
On May 5, 2026, Rubio met with SOUTHCOM commander General Francis L. Donovan about Operation Southern Spear with a map of Cuba on the background. When asked why he posed for a picture with the map of Cuba, he said, "Cuba is under the Southern Command—you know, it's the closest part. Our ambassadors were all over the Western Hemisphere. I met with the general who just took command of SOUTHCOM, and there was a map of Cuba behind us. I thought it would be fitting to take a picture in front of it because it's the closest to the United States within SOUTHCOM." On May 7, Rubio announced a new set of sanctions on Cuba's Grupo de Administración Empresarial S.A. (GAESA), which is controlled by the Cuban military. Rubio has called GAESA the heart of Cuba's communist system.

==== Egypt ====
During the 2026 Iran war, Rubio waived a human rights restriction on US$320 million in military aid to Egypt.

==== Deportation ====
April 2025 memo from Marco Rubio determining that Mahmoud Khalil is deportable.

Page 2 of Rubio memo regarding Mahmoud Khalil.

Rubio signed memos determining that multiple non-citizens are deportable because "the Secretary of State has reasonable ground to believe that the alien's presence or activities in the United States would have potentially serious adverse foreign policy consequences for the United States." The "basis for this determination is the alien's past, current, or expected beliefs, statements, or associations that are otherwise lawful".

==== Athens address ====
In October 2026, during a diplomatic tour of European NATO allies, Rubio delivered an address from the Pnyx in Athens, Greece, with the Acropolis in the background. Invoking ancient Greek concepts, Rubio argued that Western nations had weakened by losing qualities such as ambition, courage, national loyalty, and a willingness to pursue greatness. Rubio presented the Trump administration's America First approach and its "unapologetic pursuit of national power" as a basis for strengthening Western and transatlantic cooperation against great-power threats. He also warned about mass migration, argued that diplomacy should be backed by credible willingness to use force, and urged European allies to strengthen institutions and alliances in response to shared security challenges.

==== Left-wing politics ====
Rubio sought global support for cracking down on a "resurgence of political terrorism" from left-wing politics.

== Political positions ==
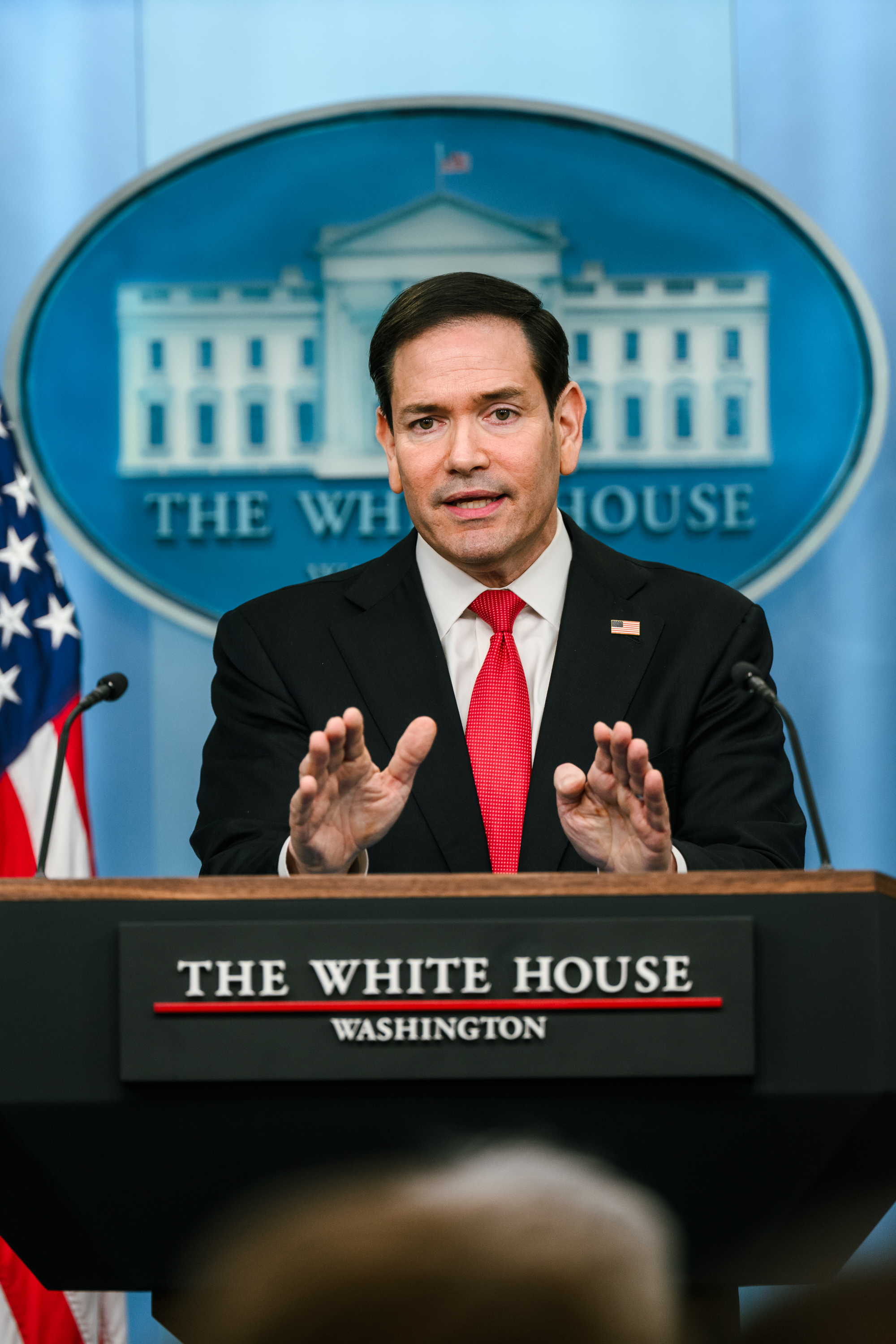
Rubio briefs members of the media on May 5, 2026

As of early 2015, Rubio had a rating of 98.67 by the American Conservative Union, based on his lifetime voting record in the Senate. According to the National Journal, in 2013 Rubio was the 17th most conservative senator. The Club for Growth gave Rubio ratings of 93 percent and 91 percent based on his voting record in 2014 and 2013 respectively, and he has a lifetime rating from the organization above 90 percent.

Rubio initially won his U.S. Senate seat with strong Tea Party backing, but his 2013 support for comprehensive immigration reform legislation led to a decline in their support for him. Rubio's stance on military, foreign policy, and national security issues—such as his support for arming the Syrian rebels and for the NSA—alienated some libertarian Tea Party activists.

Rubio supports balancing the federal budget, while prioritizing defense spending. During his first term as senator, Rubio rejected the scientific consensus on climate change, argued that human activity did not play a major role, and claimed that proposals to address climate change would be ineffective and economically harmful. He reversed this position by 2018, saying that humans contribute to an increase in greenhouse gases and sea levels are rising at a measurable rate. In 2020, he joined the bipartisan Climate Solutions Caucus. Rubio opposes the Affordable Care Act (Obamacare) and has voted to repeal it. He opposes net neutrality, a policy that requires Internet service providers to treat data on the Internet the same regardless of its source or content. Early in his Senate tenure, Rubio was involved in bipartisan negotiations to provide a pathway to citizenship for 11 million undocumented immigrants while implementing various measures to strengthen the U.S. border; the bill passed the Senate but was blocked by immigration hardliners in the House. Over time, Rubio distanced himself from his previous efforts to reach a compromise on immigration, and developed more hardline views on immigration, rejecting bipartisan immigration reform efforts in 2018.

Rubio is an outspoken opponent of abortion. He has said that he would ban it even in cases of rape and incest, but with exceptions if the mother's life is in danger.

Rubio has expressed caution about efforts to reduce penalties for drug crimes, saying that "too often" the conversation about criminal justice reform "starts and ends with drug policy". He has said that he would be open to legalizing non-psychoactive forms of cannabis for medical use, but otherwise opposes its legalization for recreational and medical purposes. Rubio has said that if elected president he would enforce federal law in states that have legalized cannabis.

Rubio supports setting corporate taxes at 25%, reforming the tax code, and capping economic regulations, and proposes to increase the social security retirement age based on longer life expectancy. He supports expanding public charter schools, opposes Common Core State Standards, and advocates closing the federal Department of Education.

Rubio's foreign policy approach has been described as "interventionist" and "hawkish". He supported the 2003 invasion of Iraq and military intervention in Libya. Rubio voiced support for a Saudi Arabian-led intervention in Yemen against Houthi rebels. Regarding Iran, he supports tough sanctions, and scrapping the nuclear deal with Iran; regarding the Islamic State, he favors aiding local Sunni forces in Iraq and Syria. In November 2015, after the Paris terrorist attacks, Rubio said that, because background checks could not be done, the U.S. should accept no more Syrian refugees. He supported working with allies to set up no-fly zones in Syria to protect civilians from Bashar al-Assad. He favors collection of bulk metadata for purposes of national security. He has said that gun control laws consistently fail to achieve their purpose. He is supportive of the Trans-Pacific Partnership, saying that the U.S. risks being excluded from global trade unless it is more open to trade. On capital punishment, Rubio favors streamlining the appeals process.

As a senator, Rubio was very hawkish in regard to China and the Chinese Communist Party (CCP), and has been called one of the U.S. Congress's most hawkish members on China. Rubio believed that without a major effort to defeat China, the world is headed to "a new dark age of exploitation, conquest, and totalitarianism". He also said the U.S. should support democracy, freedom, and autonomy for Hong Kong. On August 28, 2018, Rubio and 16 other members of Congress urged the U.S. to impose sanctions under the Global Magnitsky Act against Chinese officials responsible for human rights abuses against the Uyghur Muslim minority in Xinjiang. China sanctioned him in 2020 and banned him from traveling to the country for his support for Hong Kong's democracy movement. Rubio also strongly supported Taiwan and its independence. He condemned holding the 2022 Winter Olympics in China due to its "evil, genocidal regime", saying that he would "work to ensure that the Olympics are never hosted in the People's Republic of China again". In 2022, he introduced the Chinese Communist Party Visa Ban Act, which would effectively prohibit any member of the CCP from visiting the United States. In March 2023, he voiced support for revoking China's permanent normal trade relations status.

After he became Secretary of State, Rubio called for cooperation with China. In 2026, he said, "Areas where we can find mutual cooperation, I think we can", adding, "There's probably virtually no problem in the world that we can't solve if we work together on it". Of tensions, Rubio said, "There's always going to be irritants".

Rubio condemned the genocide of the Rohingya Muslim minority in Myanmar and called for a stronger response to the crisis. He condemned Turkey's wide-ranging crackdown on dissent following a failed 2016 coup. He is a vocal opponent of former Venezuelan President Nicolás Maduro.

At a February 2018 CNN town hall event in the wake of the Stoneman Douglas High School shooting, Rubio defended his record of accepting contributions from the National Rifle Association (NRA), saying, "The influence of these groups comes not from money. The influence comes from the millions of people that agree with the agenda, the millions of Americans that support the NRA."

In March 2018, Rubio defended the decision of the Trump administration to add a citizenship question to the 2020 census. Experts noted that the inclusion of such a question would likely result in severe undercounting of the population and faulty data, as undocumented immigrants would be less likely to respond to the census. Fellow Republican members of Congress from Florida, Ileana Ros-Lehtinen and Mario Diaz-Balart, criticized the Trump administration's decision on the basis that it could lead to a faulty census and disadvantage Florida in terms of congressional apportionment and fund apportionment.

In July 2018, Rubio offered an amendment to a major congressional spending bill to potentially force companies that purchase real estate in cash to disclose their owners as "an attempt to root out criminals who use illicit funds and anonymous shell companies to buy homes".

Rubio opposed the Affordable Care Act ("Obamacare"). In April 2020, the U.S. Supreme Court voted 8–1 to defeat his attempt to stop Obamacare.

In March 2016, Rubio opposed President Obama's nomination of Merrick Garland to the Supreme Court, saying, "I don't think we should be moving forward with a nominee in the last year of this president's term. I would say that even if it was a Republican president." In September 2020, Rubio applauded Trump's nomination of Amy Coney Barrett to the court after Justice Ruth Bader Ginsburg's death, voting to confirm her on October 26, 86 days before the expiration of Trump's presidential term.

Rubio has a mixed relationship with Donald Trump. During the Republican primaries in the 2016 presidential election, they harshly criticized each other. But during Trump's presidency, Rubio "[supported] just about everything Trump said and did", according to the Sun-Sentinel.

Rubio is a staunch supporter of Israel. He is a co-sponsor of a Senate resolution expressing objection to the UN Security Council Resolution 2334, which condemned Israeli settlement building in the occupied Palestinian territories as a violation of international law. Rubio condemned the October 7 attacks and expressed his support for Israel and its right to self-defense. He called for the complete eradication of Hamas in Gaza. When asked if there was a way to stop Hamas without causing massive civilian casualties in Gaza, Rubio said Israel cannot coexist "with these savages…. They have to be eradicated." In 2023, he said Hamas was "100 percent to blame" for Palestinian casualties in Gaza.

In February 2022, Rubio condemned Russia's invasion of Ukraine. In November 2024, he called Ukrainians "incredibly brave and strong", but said the war in Ukraine had reached a "stalemate" and "needs to be brought to a conclusion" to avoid further casualties.

== Personal life ==
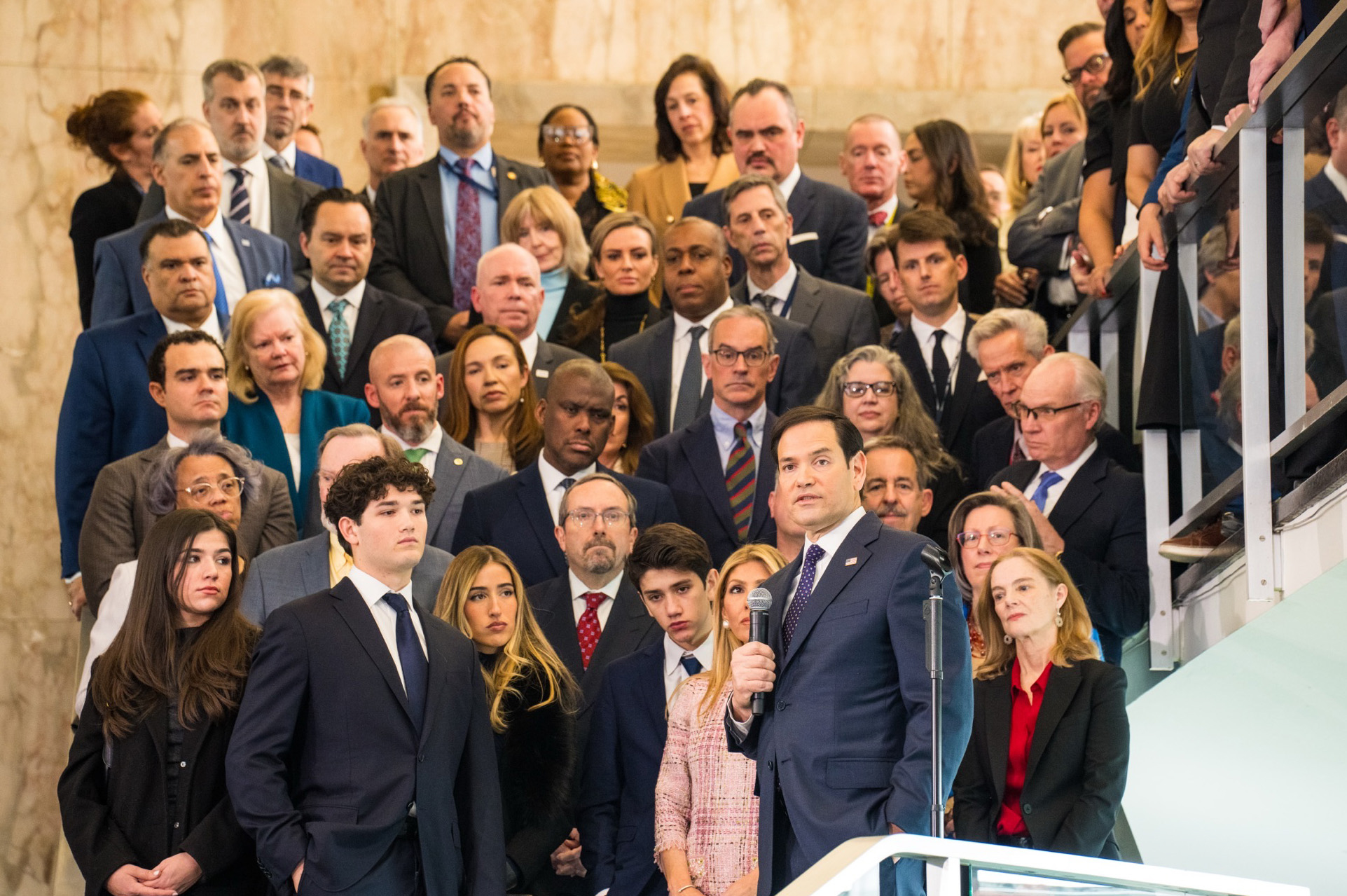
Rubio's family (front row, from left) watching him deliver remarks on his first day in State Department on January 21, 2025

In 1998, Rubio married Jeanette Dousdebes, who also is from a Hispanic family. Her parents immigrated from Colombia. She is a former bank teller and Miami Dolphins cheerleader. Their wedding was held in a Catholic church, the Church of the Little Flower. They have four children. Their eldest son, Anthony, is a running back for the Florida Gators football team. Rubio and his family live in West Miami, Florida. Rubio is bilingual and fluent in Spanish, his first language.

Rubio is Catholic and attends Mass at Church of the Little Flower in Coral Gables, Florida. He previously attended Christ Fellowship, a Southern Baptist Church, in The Hammocks, Florida (among those mentioned earlier).

In a speech at the 2026 Security Conference in Munich, Rubio said he was of Spanish and Italian heritage from Seville and Casale Monferrato, Kingdom of Piedmont.

Rubio is a fan of 1990s hip-hop, including 2Pac, Public Enemy, and Eminem. He has referenced hip-hop lyrics in political speeches.

Rubio suffers from color blindness.

== Electoral history ==
2010 Florida Senatorial Republican primary results
Party	Candidate	Votes	%
Republican	Marco Rubio	1,059,513	84.6%
Republican	William Kogut	111,584	8.9%
Republican	William Escoffery	81,873	6.5%
Total votes		1,252,970	100.0%

2010 United States Senate election in Florida
Party	Candidate	Votes	%	±%
Republican	Marco Rubio	2,645,743	48.89%	−0.54%
Independent	Charlie Crist	1,607,549	29.71%	+29.71%
Democratic	Kendrick Meek	1,092,936	20.20%	−28.12%
Libertarian	Alexander Snitker	24,850	0.46%	N/A
Independent	Sue Askeland	15,340	0.28%	N/A
Independent	Rick Tyler	7,394	0.14%	N/A
Constitution	Bernie DeCastro	4,792	0.09%	N/A
Independent	Lewis Jerome Armstrong	4,443	0.08%	N/A
Independent	Bobbie Bean	4,301	0.08%	N/A
Independent	Bruce Riggs	3,647	0.07%	N/A
Write-in		108	0.00%	0.00%
Majority		1,038,194	19.19%	+18.08%
Turnout		5,411,106	48.25%	−22.67%
Total votes		5,411,106	100.00%	
Republican hold		Swing		

Cumulative results of the 2016 Republican Party presidential primaries
Party	Candidate	Votes	%
Republican	Donald Trump	14,015,993	44.95%
Republican	Ted Cruz	7,822,100	25.08%
Republican	John Kasich	4,290,448	13.76%
Republican	Marco Rubio	3,515,576	11.27%
Republican	Ben Carson	857,039	2.75%
Republican	Jeb Bush	286,694	0.92%
Republican	Rand Paul	66,788	0.21%
Republican	Mike Huckabee	51,450	0.16%
Republican	Carly Fiorina	40,666	0.13%
Republican	Chris Christie	57,637	0.18%
Republican	Jim Gilmore	18,369	0.06%
Republican	Rick Santorum	16,627	0.05%

2016 Republican National Convention delegate count
Party	Candidate	Votes	%
Republican	Donald Trump	1,441	58.3%
Republican	Ted Cruz	551	22.3%
Republican	Marco Rubio	173	7.0%
Republican	John Kasich	161	6.5%
Republican	Ben Carson	9	0.4%
Republican	Jeb Bush	4	0.2%
Republican	Rand Paul	1	<0.01%
Republican	Mike Huckabee	1	<0.01%
Republican	Carly Fiorina	1	<0.01%

2016 Florida Senatorial Republican primary results
Party	Candidate	Votes	%
Republican	Marco Rubio (incumbent)	1,029,830	71.99%
Republican	Carlos Beruff	264,427	18.49%
Republican	Dwight Young	91,082	6.37%
Republican	Ernie Rivera	45,153	3.16%
Total votes		1,430,492	100.00%

2016 United States Senate election in Florida
Party	Candidate	Votes	%	±%
Republican	Marco Rubio (incumbent)	4,835,191	51.98%	+3.09%
Democratic	Patrick Murphy	4,122,088	44.31%	+24.11%
Libertarian	Paul Stanton	196,956	2.12%	+1.66%
Independent	Bruce Nathan	52,451	0.56%	N/A
Independent	Tony Khoury	45,820	0.49%	N/A
Independent	Steven Machat	26,918	0.29%	N/A
Independent	Basil E. Dalack	22,236	0.24%	N/A
Write-in		160	0.00%	+0.00%
Total votes		9,301,820	100.0%	N/A
Republican hold				

2022 United States Senate election in Florida
Party	Candidate	Votes	%	±%
Republican	Marco Rubio (incumbent)	4,474,847	57.68%	+5.70%
Democratic	Val Demings	3,201,522	41.27%	−3.04%
Libertarian	Dennis Misigoy	32,177	0.41%	−1.71%
Independent	Steven B. Grant	31,816	0.41%	N/A
Independent	Tuan TQ Nguyen	17,385	0.22%	N/A
Write-in		267	0.0%	±0.0%
Total votes		7,758,126	100.0%	N/A
Republican hold				

== Honors and awards ==
=== Foreign honors ===
- Romania :
  - Commander of the Order of the Star of Romania (2017)
- Ecuador
  - Grand Cross of the National Order of Merit (2026)
- Peru
  - Order of the Sun of Peru (2026)

=== Awards and recognitions ===
- Everglades Champions Award (2019)
- Democracy Award for Innovation and Modernization (2024)

== Publications ==
- 100 Innovative Ideas for Florida's Future. Regnery Publishing. 2006. ISBN 978-1596985117.
- An American Son: A Memoir; An American Son: A Memoir. Sentinel HC. 2012. ISBN 978-1595230942.
- American Dreams: Restoring Economic Opportunity for Everyone. Sentinel HC. 2015. ISBN 978-1595231130.
- Decades of Decadence: How Our Spoiled Elites Blew America's Inheritance of Liberty, Security, and Prosperity. New York: Broadside Books. 2023. ISBN 978-0063296978.

== See also ==
- 2016 Republican Party presidential candidates
- Hispanic and Latino conservatism in the United States
- List of Hispanic and Latino American United States Cabinet members
- List of Hispanic and Latino Americans in the United States Congress

Political offices
Preceded by Allan Bense	Speaker of the Florida House of Representatives; 2006–2008	Succeeded by Ray Sansom
Preceded by Tony Blinken	United States Secretary of State; 2025–present	Incumbent
Preceded by Jason Gray; Acting	Administrator of the United States Agency for International Development; Acting; 2025	Succeeded by Russell Vought; Acting
Preceded by William J. Bosanko; Acting	Archivist of the United States; Acting; 2025–2026	Succeeded by Edward Forst; Acting
Preceded by Mike Waltz	United States National Security Advisor; 2025–present Acting: 2025–2026	Incumbent
Party political offices
Preceded by Mel Martínez	Republican nominee for U.S. Senator from Florida (Class 3); 2010, 2016, 2022	Succeeded by Ashley Moody
Preceded by Mitch Daniels	Response to the State of the Union address 2013	Succeeded by Cathy McMorris Rodgers
U.S. Senate
Preceded by George LeMieux	U.S. Senator (Class 3) from Florida; 2011–2025; Served alongside: Bill Nelson, Rick Scott	Succeeded by Ashley Moody
Preceded by Chris Smith	Chair of the Joint China Commission; 2017–2019	Succeeded by Jim McGovern
Preceded by Jim Risch	Chair of the Senate Small Business Committee; 2019–2021	Succeeded by Ben Cardin
Preceded by Richard Burr	Chair of the Senate Intelligence Committee; Acting; 2020–2021	Succeeded by Mark Warner
Preceded by Mark Warner	Vice Chair of the Senate Intelligence Committee; 2021–2025	Succeeded by Mark Warner
U.S. presidential line of succession
Preceded by Chuck Grassley as President pro tempore of the United States Senate	Fourth in line as Secretary of State	Succeeded by Scott Bessent as Secretary of the Treasury
U.S. order of precedence (ceremonial)
Preceded by American chargé d'affaires	United States order of precedence Secretary of State	Succeeded by Khalilur Rahman as President of the United Nations General Assembly
