= David Borrero =

American politician

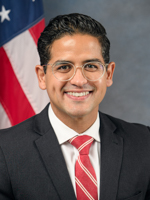

Member of the Florida House of Representatives
- Incumbent
- Assumed office November 3, 2020
- Preceded by: Ana Maria Rodriguez
- Constituency: 105th district (2020–2022); 111th district (2022–present)

Personal details
- Born: December 14, 1988 (age 37) Queens, New York, U.S.
- Party: Republican
- Education: Florida International University (BA, MBA); St. Thomas University (JD)

David Borrero (born December 14, 1988) is an American politician serving as a member of the Florida House of Representatives from the 111th district. He assumed office in the House on November 3, 2020 to represent the 105th district, but was redistricted to the 111th in 2022 after the 2020 census.

== Early life and education ==
Borrero was born in Queens, New York City in 1988. He earned a Bachelor of Arts degree in political science and economics from Florida International University, a Master of Business Administration from the Florida International University College of Business, and a Juris Doctor from St. Thomas University School of Law.

== Career ==
From 2010 to 2016, Borrero worked as a grants manager for the city of Sweetwater, Florida. In 2016, he was the campaign manager for Carlos Trujillo's successful re-election campaign to the Florida House of Representatives. Borrero joined T&G Constructors as an account executive in 2017. He has also served as a member of the Sweetwater City Commission. He was elected to the Florida House of Representatives in November 2020.

In January 2024, Borrero authored a bill that would ban flags that depict "racial, sexual orientation and gender, or political ideology viewpoint[s]" in all state government buildings, public schools, and universities. Borrero added the law would also apply to lapel pins featuring pride flags or Black Lives Matter flags.
