= An American Son =

2012 autobiography by Marco Rubio

An American Son: A Memoir
- First edition
- Author: Marco Rubio
- Language: English
- Genre: Autobiography
- Published: 2012
- Publication place: United States

An American Son: A Memoir is a 2012 autobiography by then-Florida Senator Marco Rubio. Published by Sentinel, the book recounts Rubio's family background, childhood, education, and rise in Florida politics. The book was released during Rubio's first term in the United States Senate, at a time when he was being discussed as a possible Republican vice-presidential candidate.

The first half of the book is his life story, including his family history of emigration from Cuba. The second half is about his 2010 U.S. Senate election, when he ran against Governor Charlie Crist.

== Background and publication ==
Sentinel published the book on June 19, 2012. According to the publisher, the memoir recounts Rubio's family story, including his parents' immigration from Cuba and their years working in Miami and Las Vegas.

Coverage of the book's release overlapped with national discussion of whether Mitt Romney might choose Rubio as his running mate in the 2012 United States presidential election.

== Synopsis ==
In the memoir, Rubio traces his family history and his parents' move from Cuba to the United States in 1956. He describes his childhood in Florida and Nevada, his education, his religious background, and the role of family in shaping his outlook.

Later chapters focus on Rubio's entry into politics, including his service on the West Miami city commission, his election to the Florida House of Representatives, and his rise to become Speaker of the Florida House. The book concludes with an account of his 2010 Senate campaign.
