= Tom Breiding =

American musician

Tom Breiding is an American musician, originally from Wheeling, West Virginia. He has released 14 albums, beginning with his 1992 release Railroad Town, and provided guitar or vocal tracks for several other albums by other artists, including several records with fellow Pittsburgh artist Bill Toms.

== Music career ==
Breiding was a staff writer for Tom Collins at Collins Music Corporation, on Nashville's Music Row in 1991. At that time, Collins was the largest independent publisher in Country Music in the United States, responsible for launching the careers of Barbara Mandrell and Ronnie Milsap. The exclusive publishing deal with Collins allowed Breiding to collaborate and make contacts with many other writers, artists, and publishers. The resulting catalog of material was purchased by Acuff Rose/Opryland Music in November 1999, and later by Sony/ATV in 2002.

Beginning with his 1992 release Railroad Town, Breiding has released 14 albums. He has also provided guitar or vocal tracks for several other albums by other artists, including several records with fellow Pittsburgh artist Bill Toms. He has been the full-time guitarist in Toms' band, Hard Rain, since 2002.

Breiding's television and radio appearances include Humanities on the Road on Pennsylvania Cable Network. His performance of "Steeltowns, Coalfields, and The Unbroken Circle" won a Tele Award for the Pennsylvania Humanities Council.

In 2008, Breiding worked with Pittsburgh artist Rick Malis on When We Shine, a compilation CD celebrating Pittsburgh's 250th anniversary. The project was funded by a regional asset grant to Calliope: Pittsburgh Folk Music Society. Brieding and Malis conducted writing seminars with student songwriters and collaborated on all of the album's 15 tracks. The album was produced and engineered by Tom at AmeriSon Studio in Canonsburg, Pennsylvania.

His most successful release is The Unbroken Circle: Songs of the West Virginia Coalfields which spent 16 weeks in the top 100 of the Americana charts in 2008, peaking at #55.

Songs from Breiding's 2011 release Beauty in Paradise were featured for seven consecutive weeks on Echoes, a syndicated radio program broadcast on more than 500 public radio stations across America.

== Politics ==
Breiding is actively involved with the United Mine Workers of America (UMWA), providing the music for the Fairness at the Patriot campaign in 2013 and 2014. He also made contributions to the Centennial Commemoration of the Ludlow Massacre and the 2015 Constitutional Convention in Las Vegas. In 2016 he performed on Capitol Hill in front of 10,000 union members to petition the U.S. Government to ensure cradle-to-grave healthcare for the country's coal miners. He also performed in front of thousands in support of 1,100 striking Warrior Met coal miners in Brookwood, Alabama. Much of Breiding's work with the UMWA is documented in his 2015 album and film release River, Rails or Road.

He has served as a Commonwealth Speaker for the Pennsylvania Humanities Council and an educator in the area of art for Gateway to the Arts in Pittsburgh.

== Discography ==
- Railroad Town (1992)
- The Next Heartache (1997)
- Guitar and Pen (1998)
- Happy Hour in the Round Hotel (2000)
- American Son (2001)
- Two Tone Chevrolet (2004)
- Guitar and Pen Volume II (2005)
- Time to Roll (2006 AmeriSon Records)
- The Unbroken Circle (2007 AmeriSon Records)
- Beauty in Paradise (2011 AmeriSon Records)
- Fairness at Patriot (2013)
- Live at the Leaf and Bean: Bootleg (2014)
- River, Rails or Road – Album and Film (2015)
- Love Commits Me Here (2019)
