= Anna Escobedo Cabral =

American politician

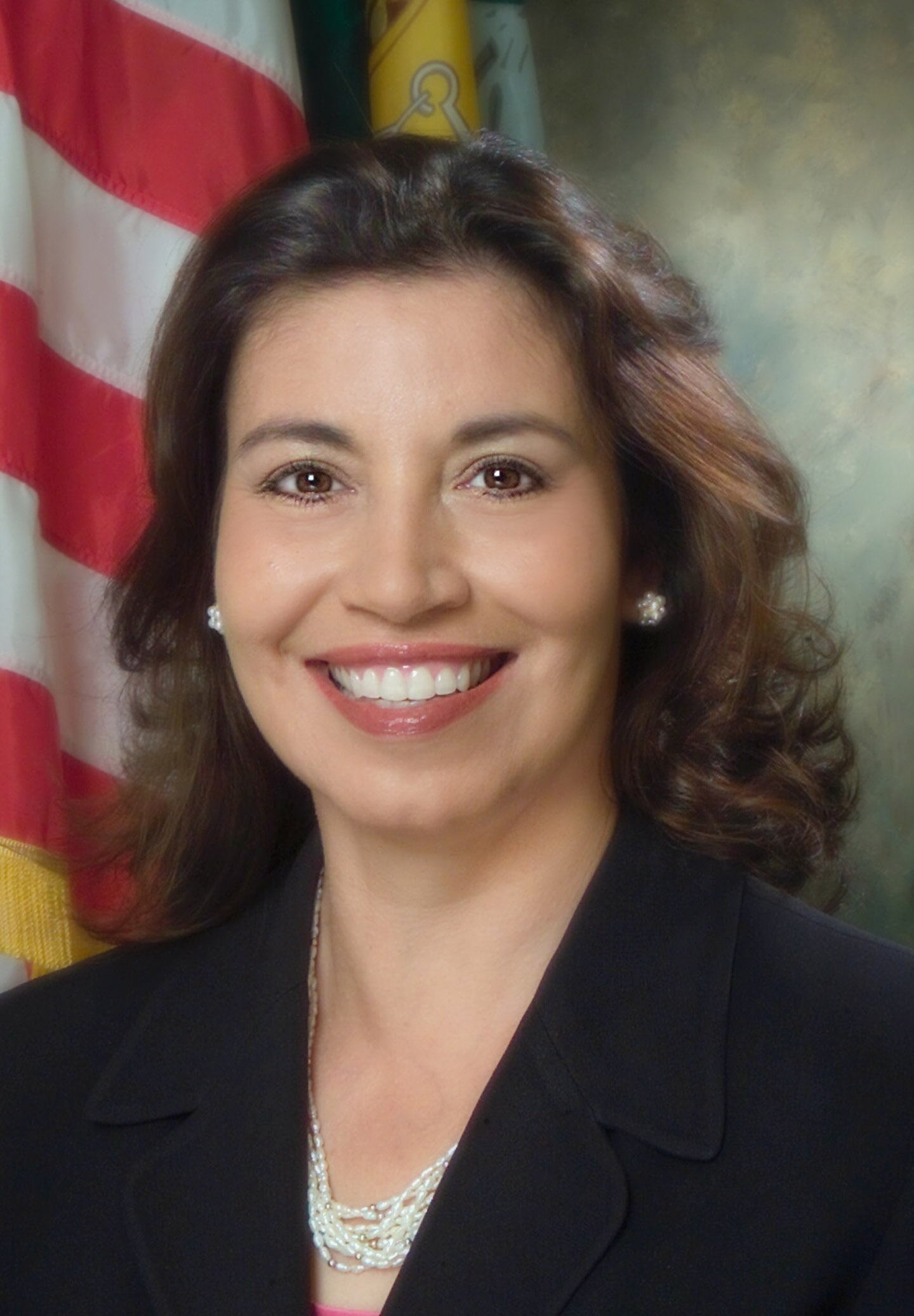
- Official portrait

42nd Treasurer of the United States
- In office January 19, 2005 – January 20, 2009
- President: George W. Bush
- Preceded by: Rosario Marin
- Succeeded by: Rosa Gumataotao Rios

Personal details
- Born: October 12, 1959 (age 66) San Bernardino, California, U.S.
- Party: Republican
- Spouse: Victor G. Cabral
- Education: University of California, Davis (BA); Harvard University (MPA); George Mason University (JD)
- Profession: Attorney

Cabral's signature, as used on American currency

Anna Escobedo Cabral (born October 12, 1959) is a Mexican-American politician who served as the Unit Chief for Strategic Communications in the External Relations Division of the Inter-American Development Bank (IDB) from 2009 to 2018. Today, she and her husband serve as partners of the Cabral Group, a consulting and public policy firm. She also serves as an independent director for Navient, a member of the Comcast NBCU diversity council, and as an advisor to the Libra Group, and Valaurum. Her current nonprofit commitments include serving as chair of the BBVA Microfinance Foundation, chair of the Jessie Ball duPont Fund, Treasurer of Lideramos, a national Latino organization focused on providing leadership training to grassroots community advocates, and member of the board of governors of Orange County Community Foundation. Prior to joining the IDB, Cabral served as the 42nd Treasurer of the United States from January 19, 2005, to January 20, 2009. She became the highest-ranking Latina in the George W. Bush administration after the resignation of Rosario Marin.

== Early life and education ==
Cabral, a third-generation Mexican-American, was born and raised in San Bernardino, California, to Francisco Escobedo and Teresa Beltran. Her father's family had come to the United States from Mexico in the early 1900s as did her maternal grandmother. Alfred Escobedo, her paternal grandfather, also participated in the Bracero Program. Cabral's maternal grandfather was a Native American, born and raised on a reservation in Southern California and her maternal grandmother was from Mexico.

The oldest of five children, Cabral managed to attend Burbank Elementary School in the 1960s despite her family's hectic schedule: her father picked the fields of the Santa Clara Valley and both parents obtained various types of employment throughout the San Bernardino and Riverside counties. By the time Cabral entered high school, the family had moved 20 times.

At early ages, Cabral and her siblings had to collect scrap metal and salvage old motor parts with their father that they would then sell to help the family survive. Her father had seriously injured his back, significantly impacting his ability to provide. Her mother worked several jobs, so, as the eldest child, Cabral often had the additional responsibility of caring for her siblings.

By age 16, Cabral was already on track to finishing high school early; after graduation, she intended to find a full-time job to help her parents financially. Her math teacher, Philip Lamm, convinced her instead to consider higher education. Lamm, she recalled in a later interview, "hand wrote the application. He told me that this was a better plan and found scholarship money for me to go to college." Lamm also helped her overcome her family's initial misgivings.

Cabral initially attended the University of California, Santa Cruz majoring in political science. In her sophomore year, she met Victor Cabral, a law student at the University of California, Davis; not long after this, she transferred to Davis. Between her sophomore and junior years, the couple was married and Cabral soon left school for a few years to raise a family. During this time, she also managed her husband's law firm.

Cabral eventually returned to the university and graduated in 1987 with a bachelor's degree in political science. After considering several graduate schools, Cabral enrolled in a joint-degree program with Harvard Kennedy School at Harvard University and the Boalt Hall School of Law at UC Berkeley. She and her family moved to Massachusetts. However, halfway through the program, Cabral decided to withdraw from the law school component in order to take care of family needs. In 1990, she obtained her Master of Public Administration degree from Harvard. She eventually completed her Juris Doctor degree at George Mason University School of Law in 2008.

== Public career ==
In 1990, Cabral's husband obtained a job with the Justice Department; the rest of the family moved with him to Washington, D.C. The following year, Cabral went to work for Senator Orrin G. Hatch, as Executive Staff Director of the Task Force on Hispanic Affairs in the Senate Republican Conference which he chaired. In this capacity, she managed a caucus of 25 U.S. senators working on issues related to the Hispanic community.

In 1993, in addition to her work with the Republican Conference, Cabral assumed the post of Deputy Staff Director for the US Senate Judiciary committee for Senator Hatch, helping it to oversee federal judicial nominations as well as various Justice-related legislation.

After several years, Cabral left government service but remained in the public sector. In 1999, she was hired as president and CEO of Hispanic Association on Corporate Responsibility. A Washington, D.C.–based nonprofit coalition of 16 of the largest Hispanic organizations in the nation, HACR worked with Fortune 500 companies to increase Hispanic representation in employment, procurement, philanthropy, and governance. Under Cabral's leadership, HACR published a best practices series, and instituted a partnership with Harvard Business School to provide executive training programs in Corporate Governance Best Practices to community leaders.

Cabral participated on a number of advisory panels during this time. In 2002, she was appointed by President George W. Bush to his Council on the 21st Century Workplace, providing guidance to the White House and the Department of Labor on work-related issues. That same year, she was named to a two-year term on the Diversity Council of the Premier Automotive Group, an outreach effort of the Ford Motor Company. She also served on the boards of the Sewall–Belmont House and Museum, a historic center commemorating women's suffrage, and Martha's Table, a nonprofit that assists the less fortunate to better themselves through volunteer activities.

In 2003, Cabral was named Director of the Center for Latino Initiatives at the Smithsonian Institution. While at the center, she led a pan-institutional effort to improve Latino representation in exhibits and public programming among the Institution's 19 museums, five research centers, and the National Zoo.

Cabral was nominated for the post of U.S. Treasurer by President Bush on July 22, 2004, and confirmed by the U.S. Senate on November 20.

== U.S. Treasurer ==
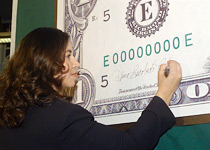
U.S. Treasurer provides signature for new US Currency, April 2005

Cabral was sworn in on January 19, 2005, becoming the highest-ranking Latina in the Bush administration and ending a seventeen-month vacancy in the office brought about by the resignation of Rosario Marin. John W. Snow, the Secretary of the Treasury, presided over the ceremony together with Senator Orrin G. Hatch, which was also attended by Alberto Gonzales, the chief White House Counsel who had just been nominated as the first Hispanic Attorney General. The first currency with Cabral's signature was printed in April the same year.

While Treasurer, Cabral oversaw the latest infusion of new currency designed to defeat counterfeiting efforts. She also served during the Hurricane Katrina incident along the southern coast. In the wake of the disaster, Cabral dedicated much of her time in developing methods to help people affected in rebuilding and managing their financial well-being. She also provided advice and counsel to the Treasury Department in its efforts to provide economic assistance to devastated areas.

Despite a heavy work schedule and numerous speaking engagements, Cabral returned to school in order to obtain her Juris Doctor. She was inspired in this move by her mother, who returned to school at age 52 to get her high school diploma. In 2003, she began taking night courses at the Arlington campus of the George Mason University School of Law. In her second year, her daughter Catalina was a fellow George Mason graduate student.

Cabral's expertise in financial education was also tapped by the Treasury Department. In 2007, she was named by Treasury Secretary Henry M. Paulson as his representative to the Community Development Advisory Board. The Board's purpose is to advise the department on the use of funds, tax credits, and investment capital in distressed communities across the nation. In June of that year, Cabral co-hosted the Pathways to Hispanic Family Learning conference with Secretary of Education Margaret Spellings. The meeting resulted in a new program, led by the White House Initiative on Educational Excellence for Hispanic Americans, that developed tools for financial literacy and provided resources to Hispanic families seeking academic success for their children.

When Cabral was appointed Treasurer the banknote series was changed from series 2003 to series 2003A to indicate that a new Treasurer had been appointed, but not a new Secretary of the Treasury. Her signature appeared on all of the series 2003A and series 2006 banknotes which began production in May 2005. While her 5-year term as Treasurer ended on January 20, 2009, with the beginning of the Obama administration, her signature continued to appear on the series 2006A $100 banknote, which was printed until May 2013, pending the resolution of production problems with the new color $100 banknote.

After leaving Treasury, Cabral went to work with the Inter-American Development Bank as a senior advisor.

== Family ==
Cabral is married to Victor G. Cabral. After working with the Justice Department, Victor had been vice president for government and Hispanic relations with Verizon and, from 2003 to 2009, senior counsel for NBC Universal/Telemundo in the Government Relations department. Today he is a partner in Energy Capital Group, a solar energy company.

Cabral began her family while still in college, causing her to delay her education by several years. She had her first child, Raquel, by the age of 20 with the remainder coming in the following five years. When she returned to school and to work, Cabral brought some of her children along. She recalls that while on Capitol Hill, her kids would fish for loose change at the vending machines: "They'd routinely come up with $20 or $30." At Harvard, her son Victor—then three years old—would ask her professor questions despite her best efforts to quiet him.

Cabral is also an accomplished seamstress, having sewed her children's clothes when younger in order to save money. She made the gowns for her three daughters' and her daughter-in-law's weddings (prominent Republican consultant Leslie Sanchez did the flower arrangements) for the eldest two daughters' weddings.

The Cabrals have four children: Raquel Cabral Terry (married to Adam Terry), Viana Cabral Greene, Catalina Cabral McCarthy (married to Brendan McCarthy), and Victor Christopher Cabral (married to Charmi Oza). Additionally, they have six grandchildren, Lilyana Cabral Greene, Joseph Milton Greene IV, Vivienne Holland Greene, Henry Matthew Sours, Ava Grace Terry and Maya Victoria Cabral.

Three of Cabral's daughters have followed her into government service. In 2005, Raquel Cabral served in the Bush White House, the Department of Energy, and the United States Department of Justice and in July 2008, she became the deputy director of the White House Initiative on Educational Excellence for Hispanic Americans, while Viana Greene worked for the Senate Judiciary Committee and Catalina Cabral worked at both the Bush White House and the Department of Justice. Her son, Victor Cabral, graduated from MIT with a degree in Nuclear Engineering and has consulted on a number of software engineering contracts with the federal government.

== See also ==
- List of Hispanic and Latino Republicans

== Notes ==
Political offices
Preceded by Rosario Marin	Treasurer of the United States; 2005–2009	Succeeded by Rosa Gumataotao Rios
