= Alejandra Ceja =

American government official

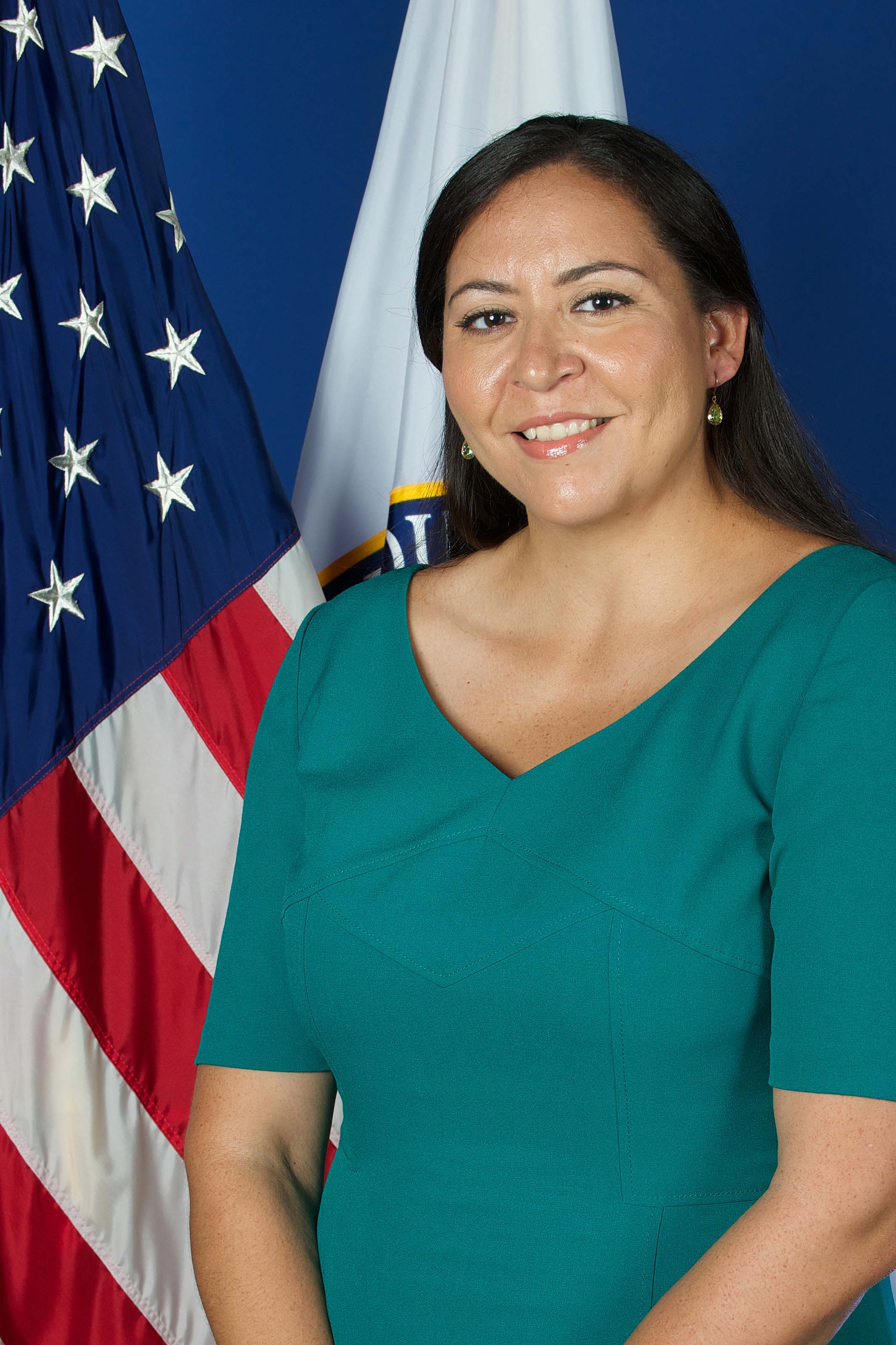
- Education: Mount St. Mary's College (Bachelor's degree); Baruch College (Master's degree)
- Occupations: Executive Director of the Panasonic Foundation, former Executive Director of the White House Initiative on Educational Excellence for Hispanics
- Employer: Panasonic Foundation

Alejandra Ceja is the executive director of the Panasonic Foundation and the former executive director of the White House Initiative on Educational Excellence for Hispanics. She served as chief of staff to the Under Secretary of Education at the U.S. Department of Education and Senior Budget and Appropriations Advisor for the House Congressional Committee on Education and Labor.

== Early life and education ==
Ceja is a daughter of Mexican immigrant parents. She was raised in Huntington Park, California. She has a bachelor's degree in political science from Mount St. Mary's College and a master's degree in public administration from Baruch College.

== Career ==
Ceja was program examiner for the White House Office of Management and Budget from 1999 to 2007. She then served as senior budget and appropriations advisor for the House Congressional Committee on Education and Labor after which she was chief of staff to the Under Secretary of Education.

Ceja was appointed as the executive director of the White House Initiative on Educational Excellence for Hispanics in the White House in 2013.

Ceja became executive director of the Panasonic Foundation in 2017.
