= White House Initiative on Advancing Educational Equity, Excellence, and Economic Opportunity for Hispanics =

US government working group

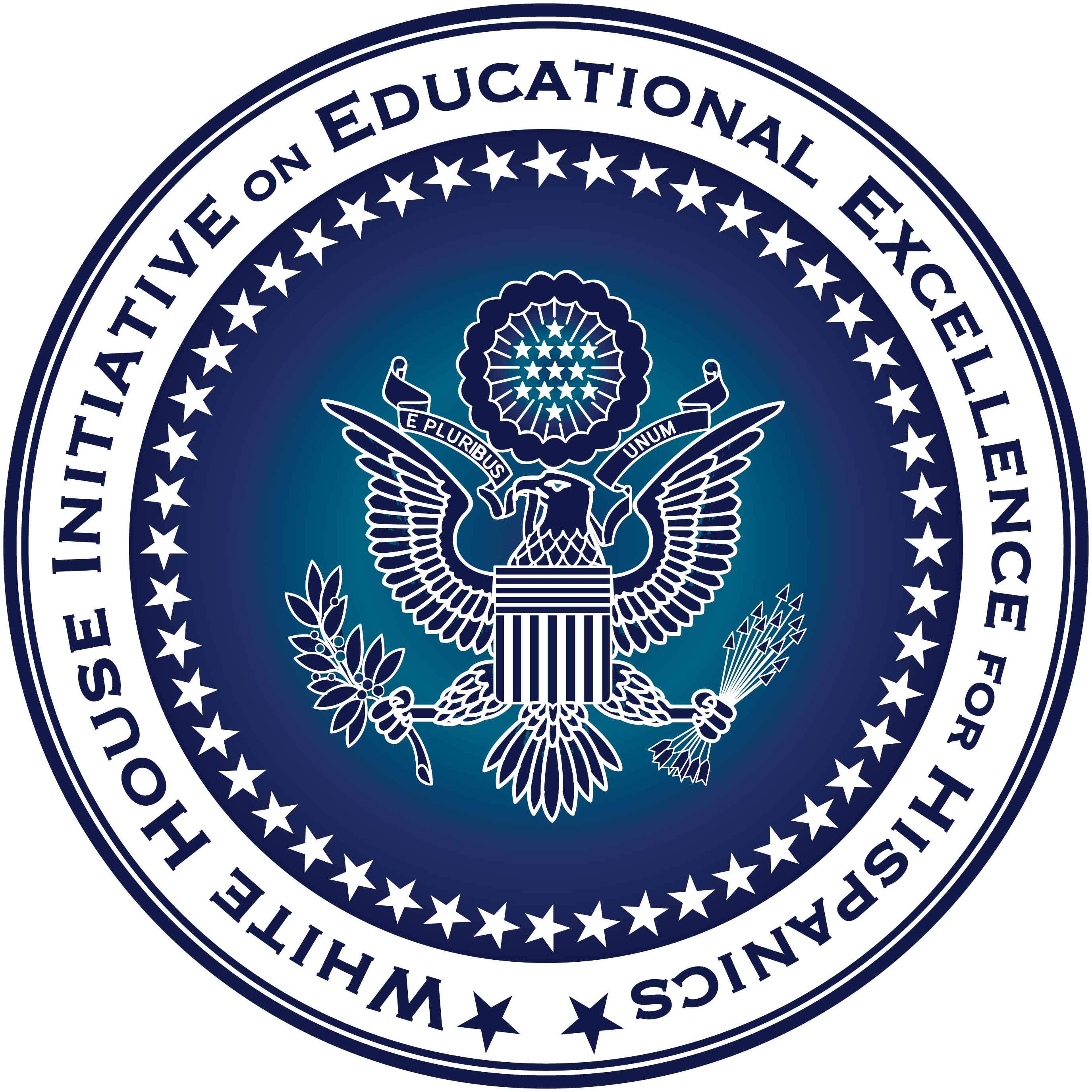

Agency overview
- Formed: September 24, 1990
- Parent agency: US Department of Education
- Website: ED.gov/HispanicInitiative

The White House Initiative on Educational Excellence for Hispanics was a multi-agency working group within the Department of Education charged with strengthening the nation's capacity to provide high-quality education while increasing opportunities for Hispanic American participation in federal education programs. In addition, the Initiative served as a resource for information related to closing the educational achievement gap for Hispanic Americans. Finally, the Initiative provided staffing to support and coordinate the mission of a President's Advisory Commission on Educational Excellence for Hispanics. The initiative was terminated on January 20, 2025 by Executive Order 14148.

== Organization ==
Despite its title, the Initiative was created by executive order as a fully staffed and funded entity within the United States Department of Education. Its purpose was to provide support for a Presidential Advisory Commission, for organizational purposes also located within the Education Department, which in turn provided advice and guidance to the President through the Secretary of Education.

=== President's Advisory Commission on Educational Excellence for Hispanics ===
The size of the Commission changed with each new Administration, numbering anywhere between fifteen and twenty-five members, and was usually led by two co-chairs. Commissioners were chosen from a wide variety of backgrounds such as educational/academic, sports figures, business, and entertainment and other celebrities. Membership was honorary and the Commissioners served without pay. All represented either highly visible Hispanic Americans distinguished in their field or other individuals noted for their commitment to Hispanic matters. In order to fulfill its mission of providing guidance, the Commission issued reports at regular or irregular intervals depending on its individual directive.

=== White House Initiative on Educational Excellence for Hispanics ===
As previously noted, the Initiative was a fully staffed office within the Education Department. It was composed of a mix of appointed and civil service officials and led by an Executive Director. The Director was named either by the President or the Secretary of Education. The Initiative's mission concluded with each Administration that created it, but the agency did not completely shut down. As a regularly staffed unit, the Initiative continued into a new Administration with a "skeleton crew" on the expectation that a new executive order would be issued or until such time as the staff was reassigned by the Secretary.

== History ==
=== George H.W. Bush administration ===
The Commission and Initiative were initially created during the George H. W. Bush Administration as a part of its overall "America 2000 Education Strategy." For at least two years, Hispanic organizations and individuals- Raul Yzaguirre of the National Council of La Raza prominent among them- had been lobbying the government for a federal agency that would oversee educational outreach for Hispanic Americans and help to improve their academic performance. After months of negotiation and planning, President Bush signed Executive Order 12729 on September 24, 1990, establishing the first Commission as well as the supporting Initiative. The goal of the Commission as outlined in EO 12729 was to "provide advice to the Secretary of Education on the progress of Hispanic Americans toward achievement of national education goals and on such other aspects of the educational status of Hispanic Americans as it consider[ed] appropriate." To that end, the Commission was expected to urge upon the Secretary a specific set of criteria:

- Enhance parental involvement;
- Promote early childhood education;
- Remove barriers to success in education and work, particularly limited proficiency in the English language;
- Help students to achieve their potential at all educational levels;
- Increase private sector and community involvement in improving education.

However, the new endeavor ran almost immediately into roadblocks that would delay its implementation for a year.

Within a few days, the first Initiative director, Gilbert Román, resigned for unknown reasons. The forced resignation of Secretary of Education Lauro Cavazos in early December put the Initiative and Commission into semi-hibernation. Finally, after increasing criticism, the first group of 17 Commission members were sworn-in in September, 1991. The Initiative also received a full staff and new Executive Director, John Florez, formerly the deputy assistant secretary for employment at the Department of Labor. At Cavazos' request, Florez had been involved in the studies that led to the creation of the Initiative.

Notable figures among the Commission included Yzaguirre, Diana Natalicio (the first female president of the University of Texas at El Paso), businessman Peter H. Coors, and golfer Nancy Lopez.

The Commission issued its sole report on October 12, 1992, entitled A Progress Report to the Secretary of Education from the President's Advisory Commission on Educational Excellence for Hispanic Americans.

=== Clinton administration ===
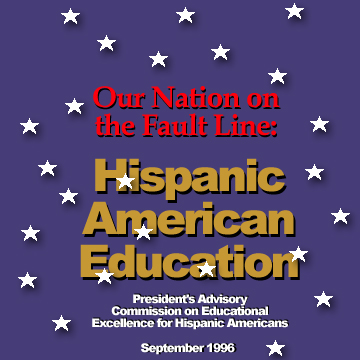
Cover of the 1996 PAC report, "Our Nation on the Fault Line."

The Commission was re-established by President Bill Clinton on February 18, 1994 by Executive Order 12900. Like its predecessor, the new Commission was to advise the President (albeit through the Secretary of Education). Its goals were modified slightly from that of the previous Administration. The Commission was oriented to

- Report the progress of Hispanic Americans toward achievement of the National Education Goals and other standards of educational accomplishment;
- Oversee the development, monitoring, and coordination of Federal efforts to promote high-quality education for Hispanic Americans;
- Develop ways to increase State, private sector, and community involvement in improving education;
- Develop ways to expand and complement Federal education initiatives.

However, once again other political issues would push implementation of the Commission's mission onto the backburner for nearly a year. Finally, on February 1, 1995, 24 members of the Commission were sworn in by Vice President Al Gore. Among the more notable figures on the Commission were academicians Guillermo Linares and Eduardo J. Padrón, author/producer John Phillip Santos, businesspersons Linda G. Alvarado and Martin J. Koldyke, and Yzaguirre, who served as its chairman.

Within a year, the Commission would become embroiled in further controversy when Yzaguirre, its chairman, accused it of being ineffective due to "bureaucratic morass and partisan politics" and criticized the Initiative's staff for inadequate support. Yzaguirre was especially incensed that its first report was nearly a year overdue. In response, the Clinton Administration thanked Yzaguirre for his service and announced that the long-awaited report was due to be completed in June. Nevertheless, it was not until September that the Commission issued Our Nation on the Fault Line: Hispanic American Education.

A new Executive Director, Sarita E. Brown, was named in 1997. Subsequent to her appointment, Brown was credited with revitalizing the Initiative's mission as well as placing renewed focus on funding for Hispanic education. On September 25, 2000, the Commission- now chaired by Linares- released its second report entitled Creating the Will: Hispanics Achieving Educational Excellence.

=== George W. Bush administration ===
George W. Bush established his President's Advisory Commission on October 12, 2001 with Executive Order 13230. The Commission's mandate was updated to dispense advice and issue reports in order to

- Map the progress of Hispanic Americans in closing the academic achievement gap and attaining the goals established by the President's "No Child Left Behind" educational blueprint;
- Develop, monitor, and coordinate Federal efforts to promote high-quality education for Hispanic Americans;
- Develop ways to increase parental, State and local, private sector, and community involvement in improving education;
- Develop ways to maximize the effectiveness of Federal education.

The Commission comprised 20 members and met for their first full meeting in February, 2002. Among its more notable members were academician Alexander Gonzalez, judge Micaela Alvarez, businessmen Charles P. Garcia and Frank Hanna III- the latter of whom served as one of the two co-chairs- astronaut Fernando Caldeiro, teacher Jaime Escalante, and singer/songwriter Jon Secada. Additionally, US Treasurer Rosario Marin, HUD Secretary Mel Martinez, and SBA Administrator Hector Barreto sat on the Commission as ex officio members or designees.

During this Administration, the Commission issued two reports. The first, entitled The Road to a College Diploma: The Complex Reality of Raising Educational Achievement for Hispanics in the United States, was released on September 30, 2002 and contained initial findings on the state of Hispanic education in the U. S. The second report, From Risk to Opportunity: Fulfilling the Educational Needs of Hispanic Americans in the 21st Century and released on March 31, 2003, offered six recommendations for increasing the educational achievement of Hispanics.

From June 16 to June 17, 2005, the Initiative hosted a conference entitled Pathways to Hispanic Family Learning. Presided over by Education Secretary Margaret Spellings and U.S. Treasurer Anna Escobedo Cabral, the meeting paved the way for a new program, the Partnership for Hispanic Family Learning, "a national network of public and private organizations that provide Hispanic families with the knowledge and tools needed to help them prepare their children for academic success." Information and resources were then dispensed through a series of regional conferences.

In 2007, the Initiative convened a conference with the American Competitiveness Initiative (ACI), The American Competitiveness Initiative: Challenges and Opportunities for Hispanic Serving Institutions. As a result of the meeting, a combined WHI-ACI working-group was formed to address the needs, strengths, and capabilities of Hispanic-serving institutions of higher learning.

=== Obama administration ===
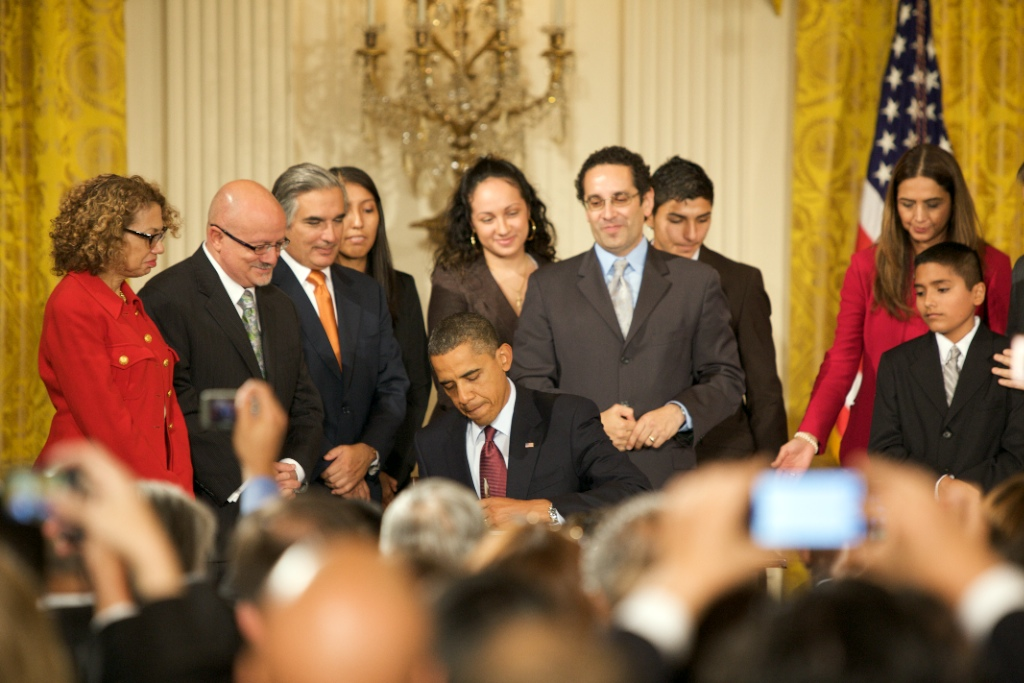
President Obama signs Executive Order 13555, October 19, 2010

In July, 2009, the Barack Obama Administration initiated a series of speaking events and meetings in order to gather input on the educational needs of the Hispanic community. A new executive order was planned for later in the year once the accumulated data could be assessed. The President set a new goal for the country: that by 2020, America would once again have the highest proportion of college graduates in the world. On October 19, 2010, President Obama signed Executive Order 13555 renewing the White House Initiative on Educational Excellence for Hispanics with the mission to help restore the United States to its role as the global leader in education and to strengthen the Nation by expanding educational opportunities and improving educational outcomes for Hispanics of all ages and by helping to ensure that all Hispanics receive a complete and competitive education that prepares them for college, a career, and productive and satisfying lives. In the executive order, the President declared, "Our country was built on and continues to thrive on its diversity, and there is no doubt that the future of the United States is inextricably linked to the future of the Hispanic community." The President appointed a new commission as well, chaired by Eduardo Padrón, and including notable members such as Shakira. According to transcripts, Shakira never attended the meetings and had Maria Mercedes Lievano sit in on her behalf. In September, 2011, the White House released a report on the education of Latinos, Winning the Future: Improving Education for the Latino Community.

In October 2013, the Initiative also launched a monthly webinar series. The webinars’ purpose is to connect leaders on a national and local scale, as well as highlight Bright Spots- programs, leaders, schools, organizations, partnerships, or models that are helping close the Hispanic achievement gap throughout the nation. The webinars were a meeting place where leaders discussed programs and initiatives, relevant policy issues, and evidence-based practices that benefit the Hispanic community. The Initiative has held webinars on: • Early Learning (October) • Immigrant Integration (November) • Family Engagement (December) • Student Financial Assistance (January) • GED Test (February) • English Learners (March) • New High School Equivalency Assessments – HiSET and TASC (April) • Improving Educational Outcomes for Hispanic Males (April) • Summer Melt (May) • Hispanic Families and Special Education (June) • Educational Technology (July) • Hispanic Teacher Recruitment (August) • College- and Career-Ready Standards (September)

In December 2013, Executive Director Alejandra Ceja announced the release of the Initiative's Second Term Action Plan for the fiscal years 2013–2016. The plan established "a framework that involves local, state and national leaders, public and private sector stakeholders, educators, families, and students in support of fostering educational excellence for the Latino community. In tandem with the Administration’s efforts, the Initiative will work to amplify the benefits of a quality early learning, highlight robust and leading examples of reform and rigor in our K-12 school systems, and promoted practices and institutions of higher education graduating more Latinos ready and prepared to enter the competitive workforce (Ceja)."

In May 2014 the Initiative released ¡Gradúate! A Financial Aid Guide to Success to help Hispanic students and their families navigate through the college application process, provide tips on filling out the Free Application for Federal Student Aid, and supply key financial aid resources available to better support Hispanics, including Deferred Action for Childhood Arrivals (DACA) and non U.S. citizen students. Since its release the guide has been highlighted by Secretary of Education Arne Duncan.

The Initiative has also advanced President Obama's My Brother's Keeper Initiative to address persistent opportunity gaps faced by boys and young men of color, including Hispanics, and ensure that all young people can reach their full potential.

The year 2015 will mark 25 years since the establishment of the Initiative. To commemorate it, the Initiative has launched a 25th anniversary year of action: Fulfilling America's Future to highlight educational gains and trends since its creation, as well as look to the future and make key policy recommendations for leadership across sectors. As a part of its 25th anniversary celebration, the Initiative will release a blueprint that will inform educational priorities for the Hispanic community, and serve as a guide for leaders working to increase opportunity and improve the outcomes of Hispanics.

=== First Trump Administration ===
On July 9, 2020, President Donald Trump signed Executive Order 13935, putting in place the White House Hispanic Prosperity Initiative, continuing the educational initiative and placing new emphasis on charter schools and school choice. Due to its timing during the campaign and near the end of his term, the Initiative was criticized as shallow and appears to have had little activity. The commission extended its focus on school choice to include a return to in-person schooling.

Members of the President’s Advisory Commission on Hispanic Prosperity included commissioners Robert Unanue, Alfredo Ortiz, Steve Cortes, Jose Fuentes Agostini, John Sanchez (chair), Mario Rodriguez, Jesus Marquez, David Olivencia, Casandra Garcia Meade; Senior Advisor Emmanuel Caudillo; and assistants to the President Dr. Andrea Ramirez and Jennifer Korn.

Unanue's controversial remarks in support of Trump at the signing ceremony resulted in calls for a boycott of his family's company, Goya Foods.

=== Biden Administration ===
On September 13, 2021, President Joe Biden signed Executive Order 14045, creating the White House Initiative on Advancing Educational Equity, Excellence, and Economic Opportunity for Hispanics to be chaired by Secretary of Education Miguel Cardona.

The following people were named as members of the Presidential Advisory Commission: Jules Buenabenta (chair), Ana Marie Argilagos, Noel Candelaria, Anna María Chávez, Evelyn DeJesus, Ana María García Blanco, Olivia C. Irlando, Leah Beth Katz-Hernandez, Regina Montoya, Enrique G. Murillo, Jr., Pedro Antonio Noguera, Amanda Renteria, Maria Angela Reyes, Cristóbal Rodríguez, Havidán Rodríguez, Teresa Leyba Ruiz, Renata Soto, Juliana Urtubey, Cid D. Wilson, Magda N. Yrizarry, and Andrea Zayas. Melody Gonzales replaced acting Executive Director Emmanuel Caudillo in December, 2021.

The Commission worked to advance twelve policy goals (quoted directly from the source):

1. [Address] systemic causes of educational challenges
2. Data collection / evidence-based strategies
3. High-quality early childhood programs
4. [Address] inequitable treatment of Hispanic and Latino children
5. High school and post-secondary graduation
6. Positive school climate & pathways to re-entry
7. Recruitment/retention of diverse educators
8. Addressing racial disparities in school funding
9. Breaking down barriers to federal funds, programs, partnerships
10. Eliminating discriminatory policies
11. Advancing economic opportunity via labor market needs
12. Increasing access to resources for economic success

On July 17, 2024, Biden issued Executive Order 14124, creating the White House Initiative on Advancing Educational Equity, Excellence, and Economic Opportunity Through Hispanic-Serving Institutions (HSIs) and the President’s Board of Advisors for HSIs.

=== Second Trump Administration ===
On the first day of his administration, January 20, 2025, Trump issued Executive Order 14148, terminating the initiatives created through Executive Orders 14045 and 14124.

== Executive Directors ==
=== List of directors ===
| No. | Name | Term of Office | President(s) served under |
|---|---|---|---|
| 1 | Col. Gilbert D. Roman | October 1990 - November 1990 | George H. W. Bush |
| 2 | John Florez | September 1991 - January 1993 | George H. W. Bush |
| 3 | Alfred Robert Ramirez | February 1994 - July 1997 | Bill Clinton |
| 4 | Sarita E. Brown | August 1997 - December 2000 | Bill Clinton |
| 5 | Leslie Sanchez | May 2001 - June 2003 | George W. Bush |
| - | Maria Hernandez Ferrier (acting) | June 2003 - December 2003 | George W. Bush |
| 6 | Adam Chavarria | December 2003 - January 2009 | George W. Bush |
| 7 | Juan Sepúlveda | May 2009 – December 2011 | Barack Obama |
| 8 | Jose Rico | December 2011 – December 2012 | Barack Obama |
| - | Marco Davis (acting) | December 2012 – May 2013 | Barack Obama |
| 9 | Alejandra Ceja | May 2013 – January 2017 | Barack Obama |
| - | Emmanuel Caudillo (acting) | January 2017 – February 2018 | Donald Trump |
| 10 | Aimee Viana | February 2018 – January 2019 | Donald Trump |
| 11 | Andrea Ramirez | January 2019 – April 2019 | Donald Trump |
| - | Emmanuel Caudillo (acting) | April 2019 – December 2021 | Donald Trump Joe Biden |
| 12 | Melody Gonzales | December 2021 – January 2025 | Joe Biden |
