= List of Latino Republicans =

The following is an alphabetically ordered list of notable Latino members of the United States Republican Party, past and present.

== A ==
- Alexander Acosta (former United States Secretary of Labor, former United States Attorney)
- Dante Acosta (California State Assembly)
- Carlos Alvarez (mayor of Miami-Dade County)
- Luis Walter Alvarez (Nobel Prize-winning physicist, inventor and professor)
- Esperanza Andrade (Secretary of State of Texas (2008-2010))
- Desi Arnaz (actor, musician, band leader, producer)
- Bryan Avila (Florida state representative)

== B ==
- Lee Baca (30th sheriff of Los Angeles County, California)
- Alonzo Baldonado (New Mexico state representative)
- Romana Acosta Bañuelos (former U.S. Treasurer, first Latina sub-cabinet official)
- José Celso Barbosa (medical doctor, sociologist, political leader; founder of Republican Party of Puerto Rico)
- Ruben Barrales (former Deputy Assistant to President George W. Bush, former director, Office of Intergovernmental Affairs)
- Bruno Barreiro (Florida state representative)
- Gustavo Barreiro (Florida state representative)
- Hector Barreto Jr. (former SBA administrator)
- Carlos Bonilla (lobbyist, adviser to President George W. Bush, senior fellow of The Heritage Foundation)
- Henry Bonilla (former U.S. congressman from Texas)
- Jaime Bonilla Valdez (joint citizen of Mexico and the United States, served on Finance Committee of John W. McCain's 2006 presidential campaign)
- Andreas Borgeas (California state senator)
- Luigi Boria (former mayor of Doral, Florida)
- David Borrero (Florida state representative)
- Esteban Bovo (member of the Miami-Dade county commission, former Florida state representative)
- George P. Bush (attorney, commissioner of the Texas General Land Office; son of former Florida governor Jeb Bush)

== C ==
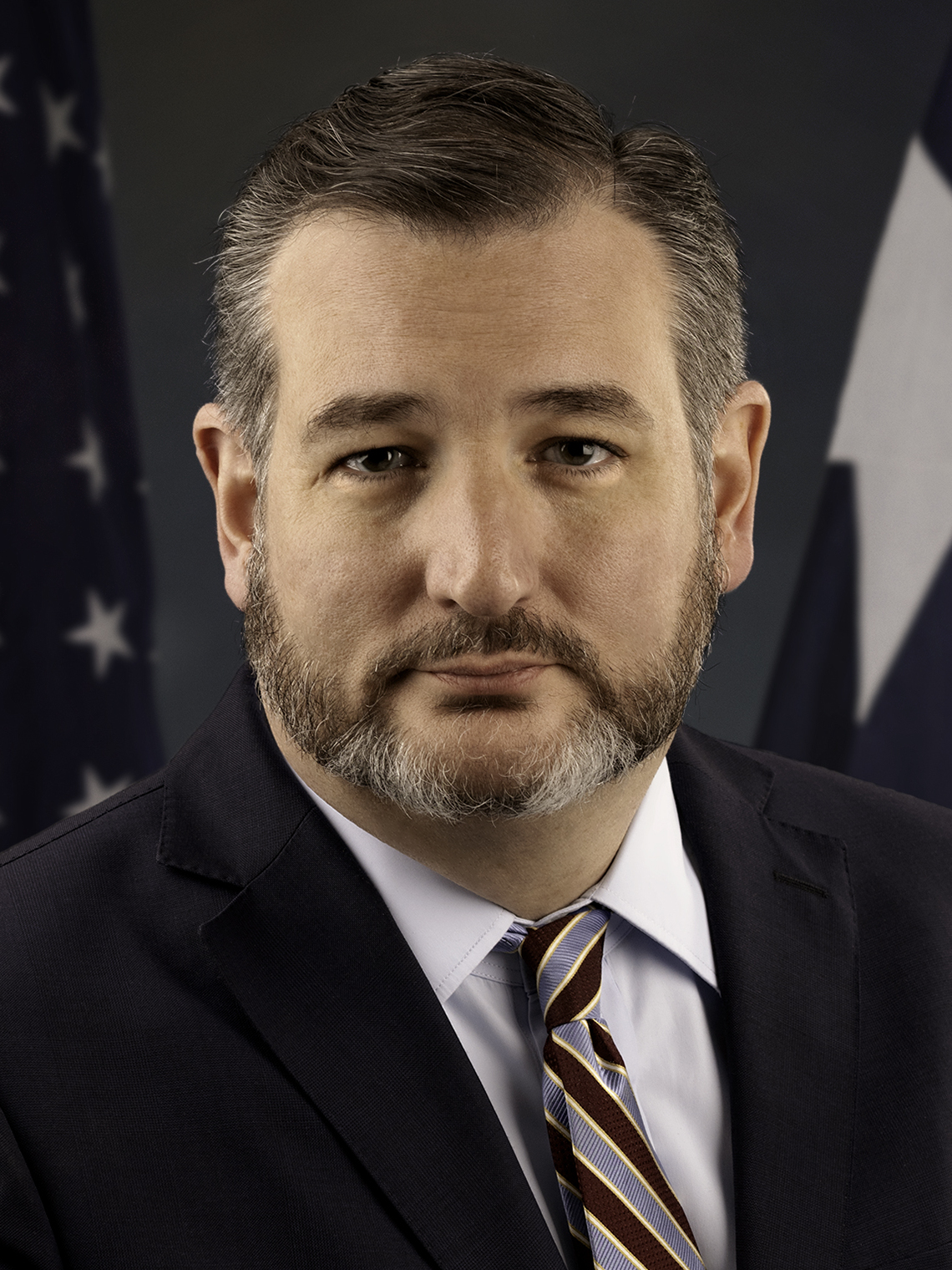
Ted Cruz, junior senator from Texas

- Anna Escobedo Cabral (former U.S. Treasurer)
- Demi Cabrera (Florida state representative)
- Rachel Campos-Duffy (former castmate on Real World: San Francisco; wife of former Republican U.S. representative Sean Duffy)
- Francisco Canseco (former U.S. congressman from Texas)
- Al Cardenas (former American Conservative Union chairman)
- Rick Carfagna (Ohio state representative)
- Joe Carollo (former mayor of Miami)
- John Carona (Texas state senator)
- Leo Carrillo (actor, active in support of Republican Dewey-Bricker ticket and Earl Warren for governor campaign in 1944)
- Carlos Cascos (former Texas Secretary of State)
- Alex Castellanos (Republican media consultant)
- Jose Francisco Chaves (delegate to the United States House of Representatives from New Mexico Territory
- Edward Chavez (former mayor of Stockton, California)
- Linda Chavez (political pundit; author)
- Rocky Chavez (California state representative)
- Dolores Chavez de Armijo (state librarian of New Mexico)
- Gil Cisneros (current Under Secretary of Defense for Personnel and Readiness)
- Jorge Luis Córdova (former resident commissioner from Puerto Rico in the U.S. Congress)
- Baltasar Corrada del Río (former resident commissioner from Puerto Rico in the U.S. Congress)
- Bob Cortes (Florida state representative)
- Page Cortez (Louisiana state senator; former member of the Louisiana House of Representatives)
- Paul Crespo (conservative political commentator, consultant and activist)
- Rafael Cruz (Protestant minister, active in Ted Cruz campaigns)
- Ted Cruz (U.S. senator from Texas, former Texas Solicitor General)
- Mike Curb (musician, record company executive, former lieutenant governor of California)
- Carlos Curbelo (former U.S. congressman from Florida)
- Alessandro Cutrona (Ohio state representative)

== D ==
- Miguel Díaz de la Portilla (Florida state senator)
- Sergio de la Peña (former deputy assistant secretary of defense for Western Hemisphere affairs, candidate for the Republican nomination for governor of Virginia in the 2021 election)
- Deadlee (rapper, actor, podcaster)
- Federico Degetau (first resident commissioner from Puerto Rico in the U.S. Congress)
- Pedro del Valle (retired lieutenant general, U.S. Marine Corps, unsuccessful candidate for Republican nomination for governor of Maryland)
- José Félix Díaz (Florida state representative)
- Manny Díaz Jr. (Florida state senator)
- Lincoln Díaz-Balart (former U.S. congressman from Florida)
- Mario Díaz-Balart (U.S. congressman from Florida)
- Ben Domenech (writer, blogger, editor and television commentator)
- Douglas Domenech (Assistant U.S. Secretary of the Interior)

== E ==
- Jose Maria Marxuach Echavarria (medical doctor, former mayor of San Juan, Puerto Rico)
- Manuel Egozcue Cintron (former mayor of San Juan, Puerto Rico, former member, House of Delegates)
- Erik Estrada (actor)
- Miguel Estrada (attorney; former federal judicial nominee)

== F ==
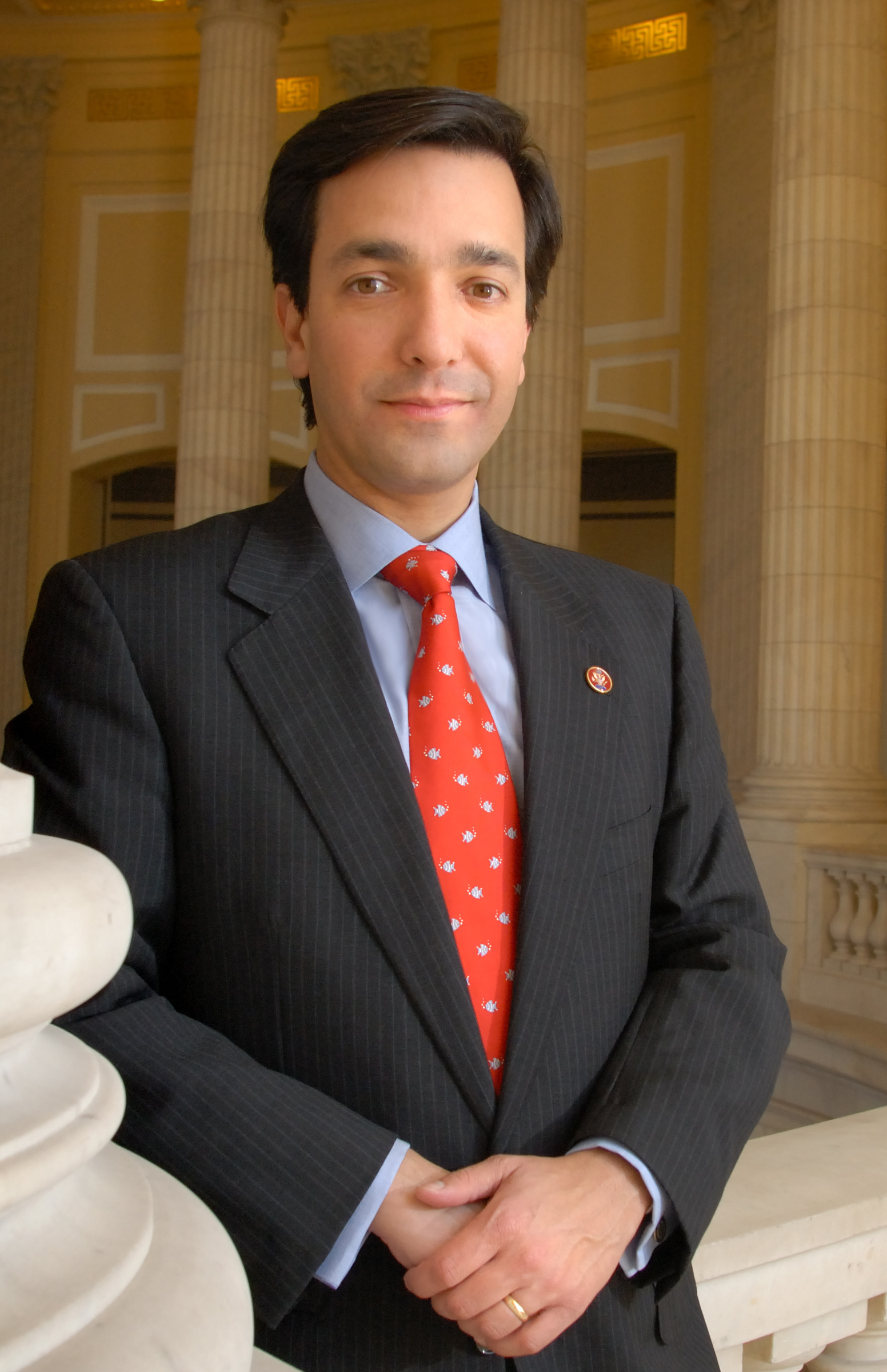
Luis Fortuño, 9th governor of Puerto Rico

- Ben Fernandez (political activist, first Latino presidential candidate)
- Juan Fernandez-Barquin (Florida state representative)
- Luis A. Ferré (former governor of Puerto Rico)
- Anitere Flores (Florida state senator)
- Bill Flores (U.S. congressman from Texas)
- Mayra Flores (U.S. congressman from Texas' historically democratic 34th district)
- Pete Flores (Texas state senator)
- Luis Fortuño (former governor of Puerto Rico)
- Jeff Frederick (first Latino elected to Virginia government, former chairman of Republican Party of Virginia)
- Nick Fuentes (political activist, podcaster, holds annual America First Political Action Conference)

== G ==
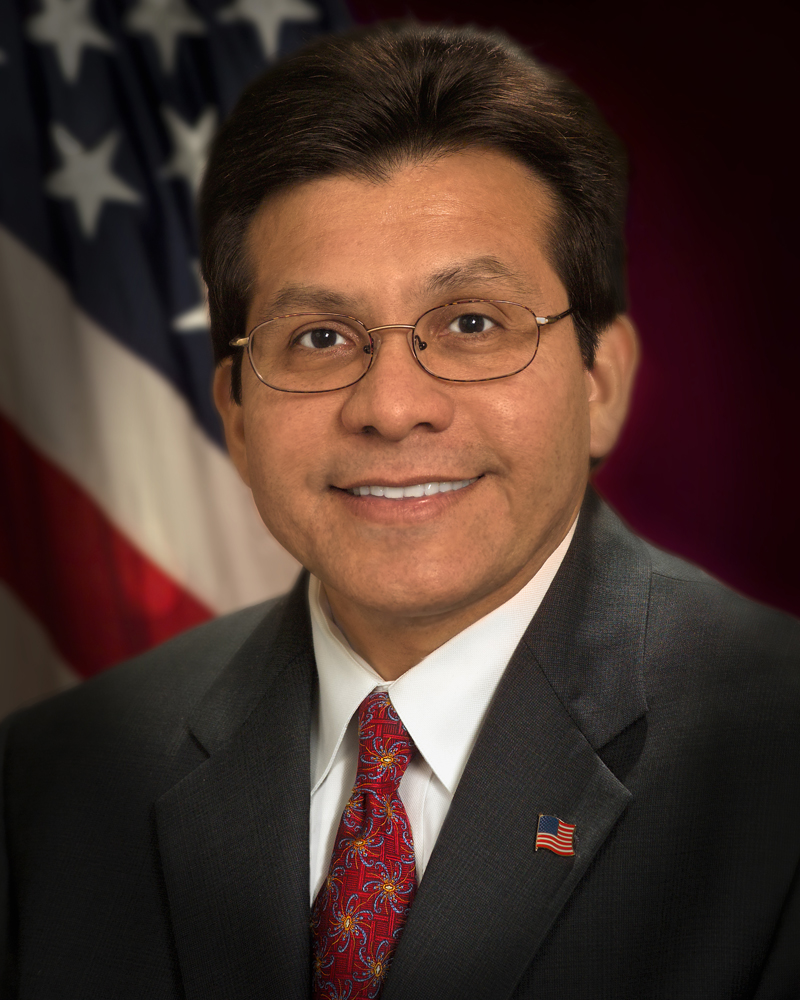
Alberto Gonzales, 80th Attorney General

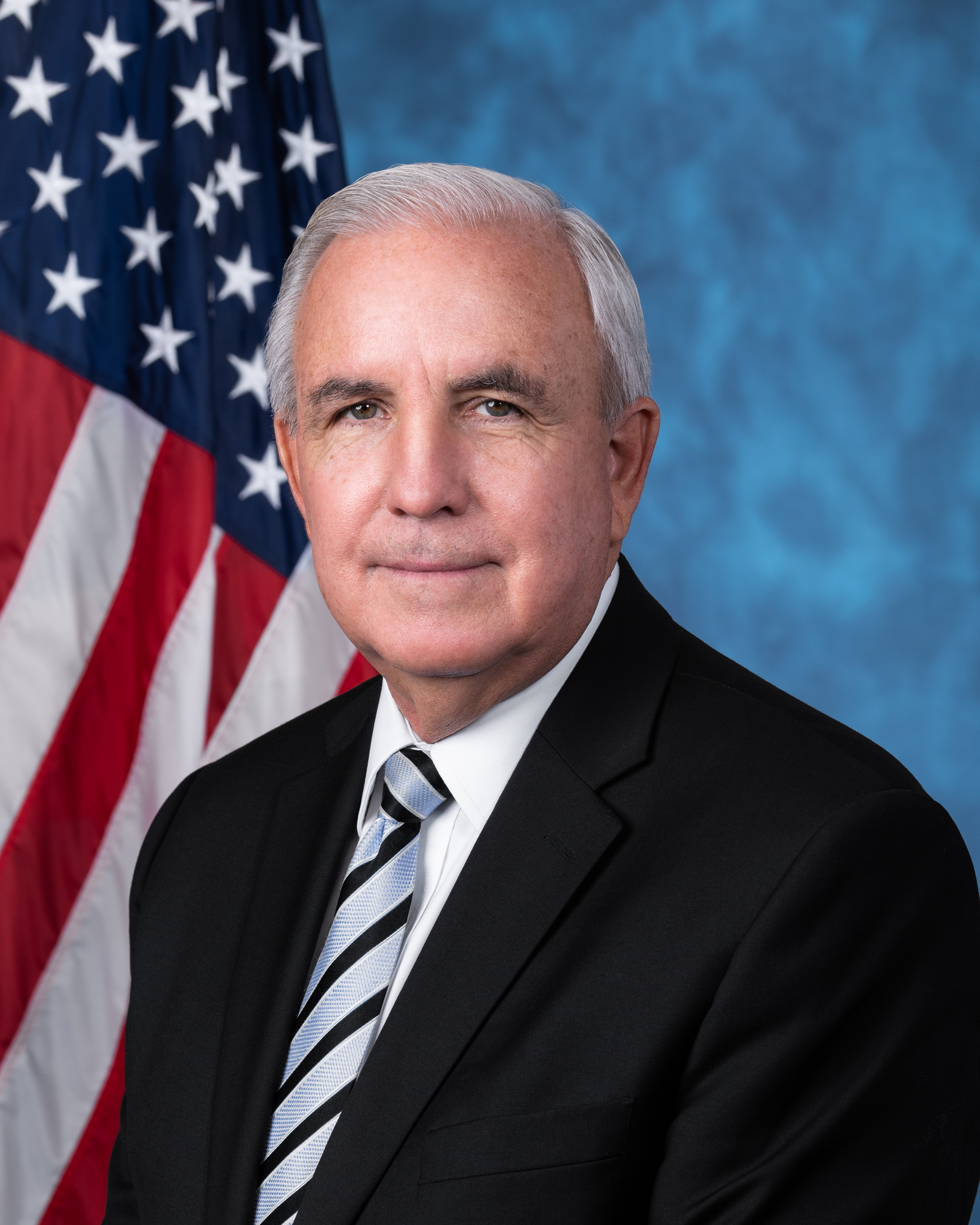
Carlos Giminez, U.S. congressman

- Andy García (actor)
- Bianca Garcia (New Hampshire state legislature)
- Bonnie Garcia (former California state assemblywoman and current candidate for California State Senate in 2014)
- Ileana Garcia (Florida state senator)
- Marilinda Garcia (former New Hampshire state legislator and candidate for the House of Representatives in 2014)
- Michael J. Garcia (judge of the New York Court of Appeals, former U.S. attorney for the Southern District of New York)
- Mike Garcia (U.S. representative from California)
- Rene Garcia (former Florida state representative)
- Rudy Garcia (Florida state senator)
- John Garza (Texas House of Representatives, District 117-San Antonio)
- Tony Garza (former U.S. Ambassador to Mexico)
- Carlos Giminez (U.S. representative from Florida, former mayor of Miami-Dade County)
- Mario Goico (former Kansas state representative)
- Gabriel Gomez (Republican nominee for Senate in Massachusetts in the 2013 special election)
- Alberto Gonzales (80th United States attorney general)
- Tony Gonzales (U.S. representative for Texas's 23rd district)
- Anthony Gonzalez (U.S. representative from Ohio and football player)
- Eduardo Gonzalez (Florida state representative)
- Jenniffer González (Speaker of the Puerto Rico House of Representatives)
- Julio Gonzalez (Florida state representative)
- Ramon Gonzalez, Jr. (member of Kansas House of Representatives)
- Virgilio Gonzalez (anti-Castro activist, Watergate burglar)
- Carlos Gutierrez (former Secretary of Commerce)
- Lino Gutierrez (former U.S. Ambassador to Argentina)
- Marco Gutierrez (co-founder of Latinos for Trump)
- Eva Guzman (justice, Texas Supreme Court, Place 9)

== H ==
- Benigno C. Hernandez (congressman from New Mexico)
- Juan Hernandez (former George W. Bush advisor)
- Shane Hernandez (Michigan state representative)
- Jaime Herrera Beutler (U.S. congresswoman from Washington State)

== J ==
- Tirso del Junco (former chair, California Republican Party and former chair, Republican National Hispanic Assembly)

== L ==
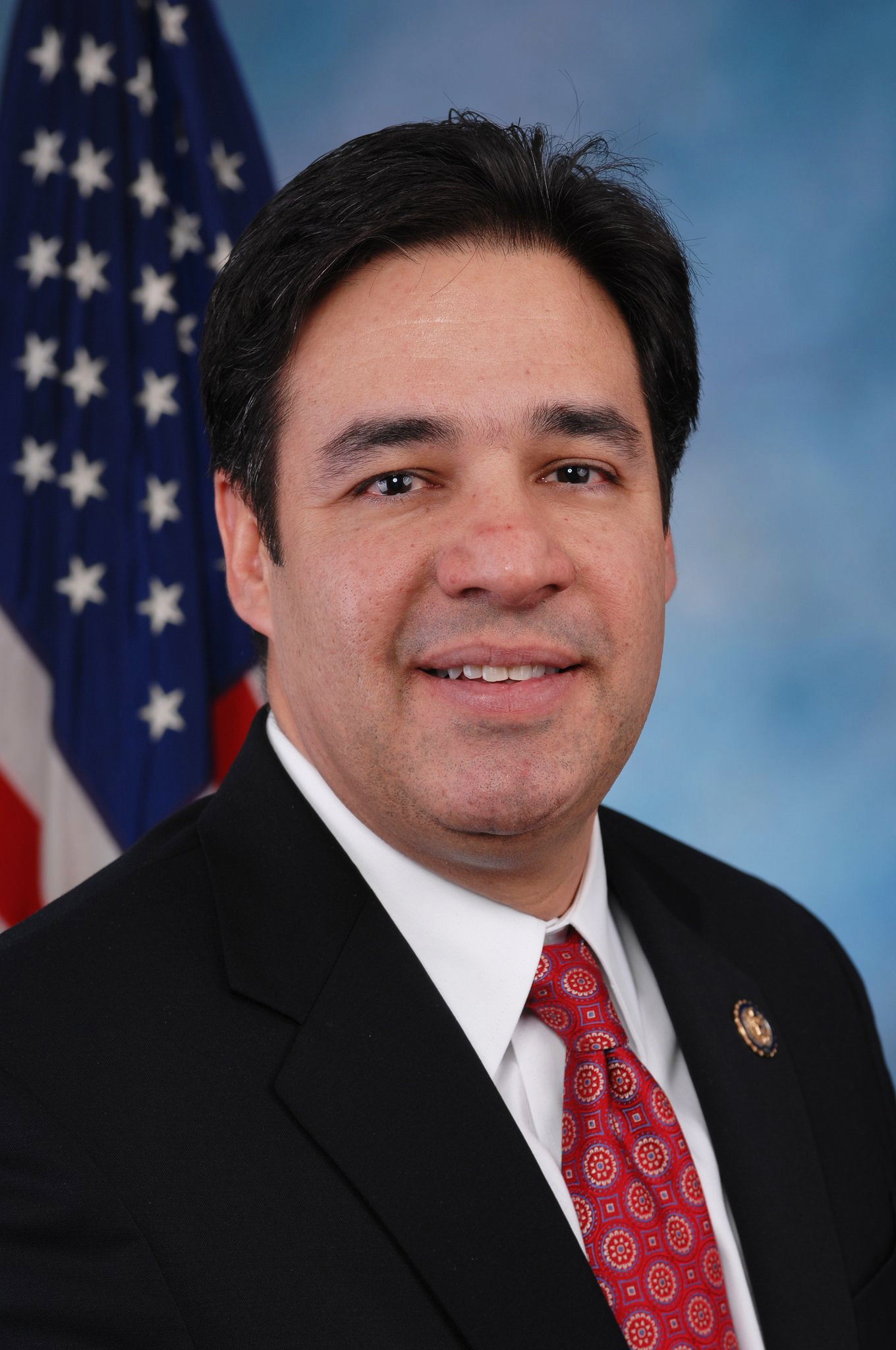
Raúl Labrador, congressman from Idaho's 1st District

- Raúl Labrador (former U.S. congressman from Idaho)
- Octaviano Ambrosio Larrazolo (first Latino U.S. senator)
- Lil Pump (rapper, endorsed Donald Trump for president in 2020)
- Eric Linder (former California state assemblyman)
- Ernesto Lopez (first Latino elected to the Delaware State Senate)
- John Lopez IV (justice of the Arizona Supreme Court since 2016)
- Pete Lopez (EPA regional administrator; former New York state assemblyman)
- Carlos López-Cantera (former lieutenant governor of Florida)
- Manuel Lujan, Jr. (former U.S. congressman and Secretary of the Interior)
- Anna Paulina Luna (member of United States House of Representatives from Florida 13th District since 2023)

== M ==
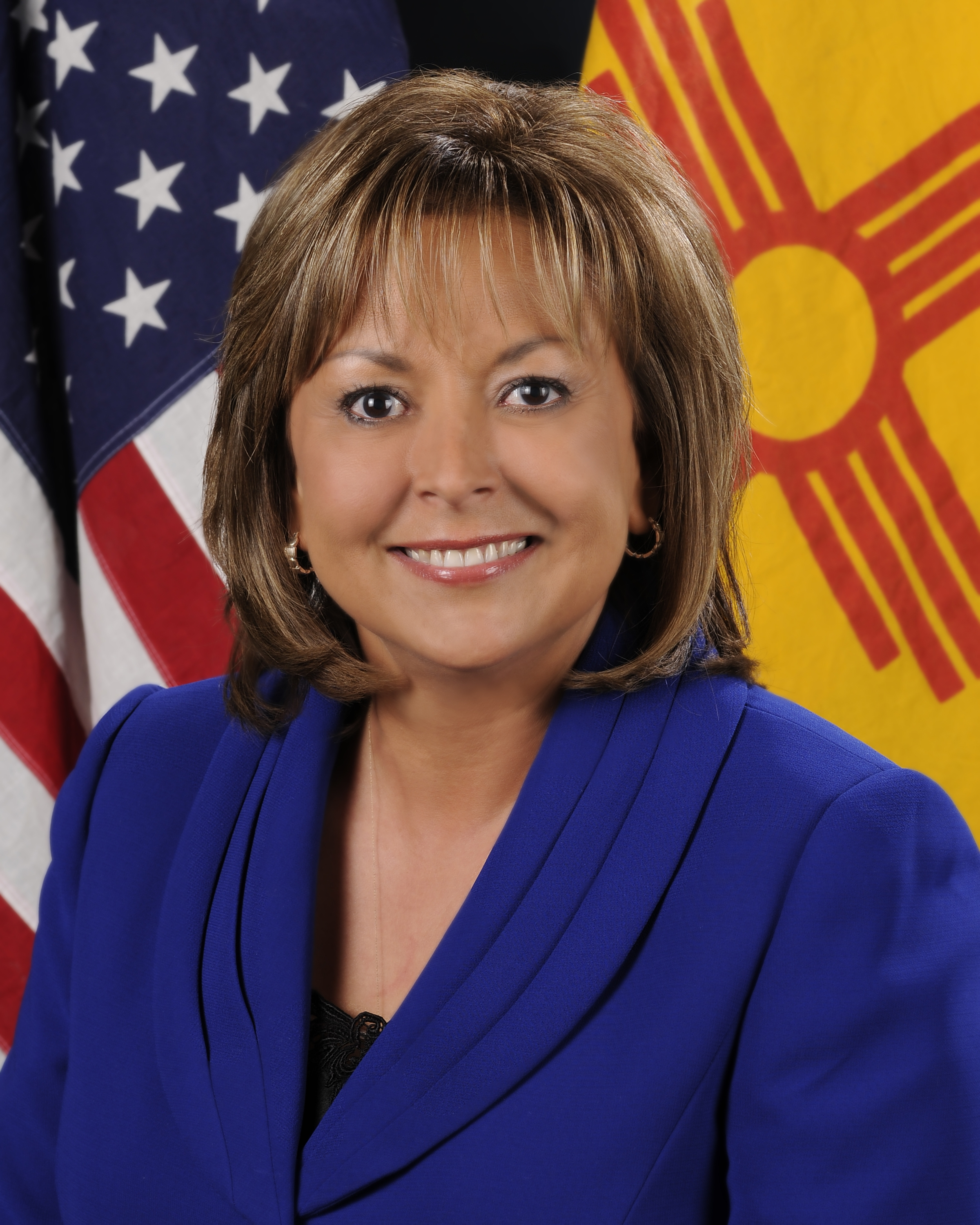
Susana Martinez, 31st governor of New Mexico

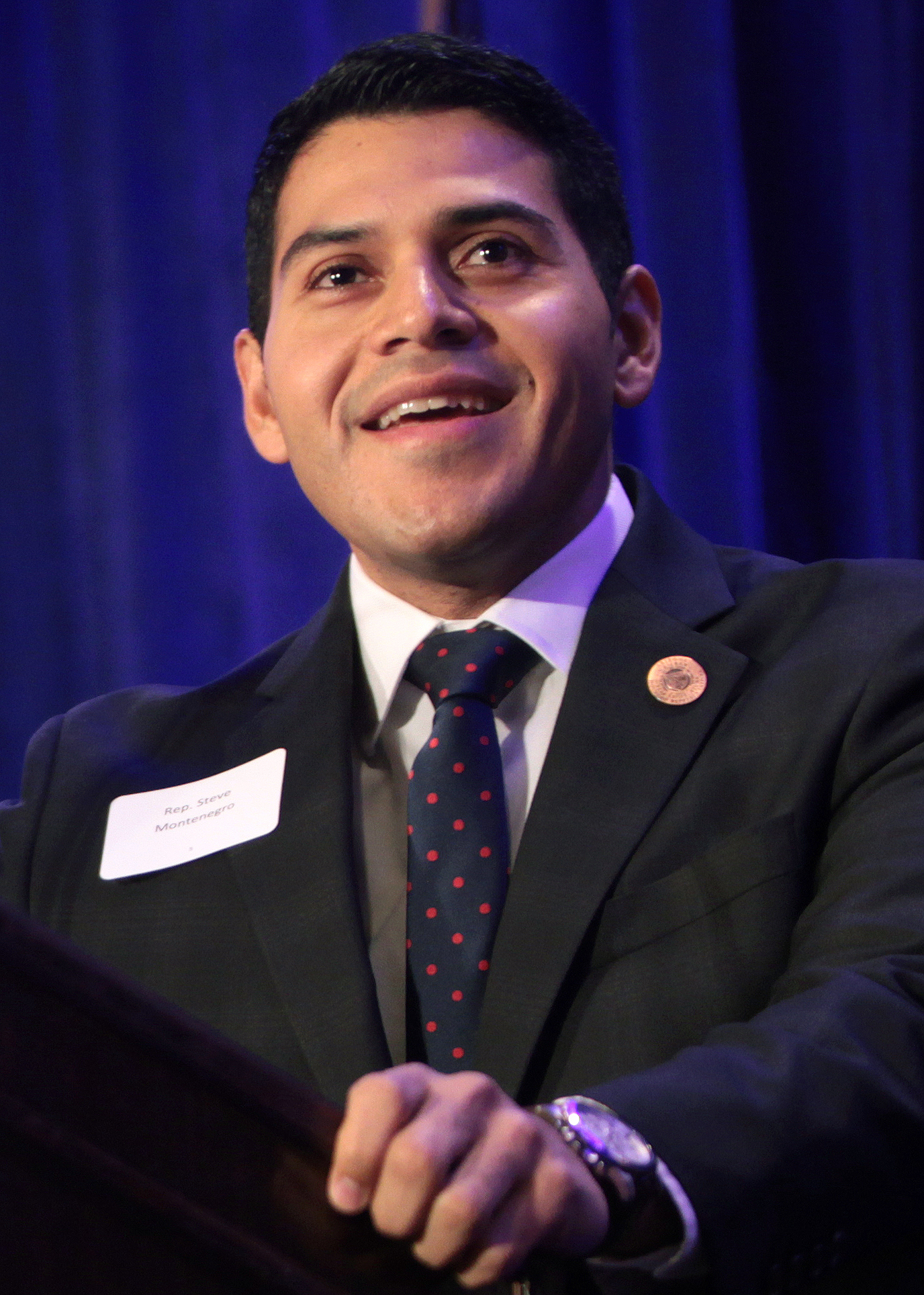
Steve Montenegro, Arizona state senator

- Abel Maldonado (former California state senator and lieutenant governor of California)
- Nicole Malliotakis (U.S. representative from New York; former state representative; 2017 candidate for mayor of New York City)
- Rosario Marin (former treasurer of the United States)
- Lea Márquez Peterson (member of the Arizona Corporation Commission, former candidate for congress)
- Bob Martinez (former Florida governor)
- Eugenio R. Martinez (anti-Castro activist, Watergate burglar)
- Matthew Martinez (US representative from California)
- Mel Martinez (former U.S. senator and former HUD secretary)
- Susana Martinez (first Latina governor in the United States, former governor of New Mexico, and former district attorney for New Mexico's 3rd Judicial district)
- Alfonso Martinez-Fonts Jr. (Assistant Secretary for the Private Sector of the Department of Homeland Security)
- Suzette Martinez Valladares (California state assemblywoman)
- Brian Mast (US representative from Florida)
- Jason Mattera (Human Events online editor, writer, and political commentator)
- Carlos Mayans (former Kansas state representative, former mayor of Wichita, Kansas)
- Melissa Melendez (California state representative)
- Miguel A. García Méndez (former Puerto Rican politician and statehood advocate)
- Carlos Méndez Martínez (Puerto Rican politician and current mayor of Aguadilla, Puerto Rico)
- Jason Miyares (former Virginia state delegate and current Virginia attorney general)
- Ricardo Montalbán (Mexican and American film and television actor)
- Steve Montenegro (Arizona state senator)
- Nestor Montoya (congressman from New Mexico)
- Rod Montoya (New Mexico state representative)
- Alex X. Mooney (former Maryland state senator, former chairman of the Maryland Republican Party and current congressman from West Virginia)
- Barbara Calandra Moore (former U.S. ambassador to Nicaragua)
- Cathy Muñoz (Alaska state representative)
- Elsa Murano (former undersecretary for food safety at the U.S. Department of Agriculture)

== N ==
- Clarice Navarro (Colorado State House District 47 representative - Republican)
- Joe Negron (former Florida state representative)
- Steve Negron (New Hampshire House of Representatives)
- Roger Noriega (former assistant secretary of state and U.S. representative to the OAS)
- Antonia Coello Novello (former U.S. surgeon general)
- Jeanette Nuñez (lieutenant governor of Florida, former speaker of the Florida House of Representatives)

== O ==
- Rosilicie Ochoa Bogh (California state senator)
- Jose R. Oliva (Speaker of the Florida House)
- Héctor O'Neill (mayor of Guaynabo, Puerto Rico)
- Katherine D. Ortega (former U.S. treasurer)
- Tito Ortiz (mixed martial artist, member of city council, Huntington Beach, California, mayor pro-tempore)
- Adelina Otero-Warren (early 20th-century New Mexico suffragist, public official and congressional candidate)

== P ==
- Rolando Pablos (Texas secretary of state)
- Bob Pacheco (former California state assemblyman)
- Rod Pacheco (former California state assemblyman)
- Romualdo Pacheco (first Mexican-American U.S. congressman and first Latino governor of the State of California)
- Daniel Perez (Florida state representative)
- Juan-Carlos Planas (Florida state representative)
- Rene Plasencia (Florida state representative)

== Q ==
- John Quiñones (former Florida state representative, Osceola County commissioner)

== R ==
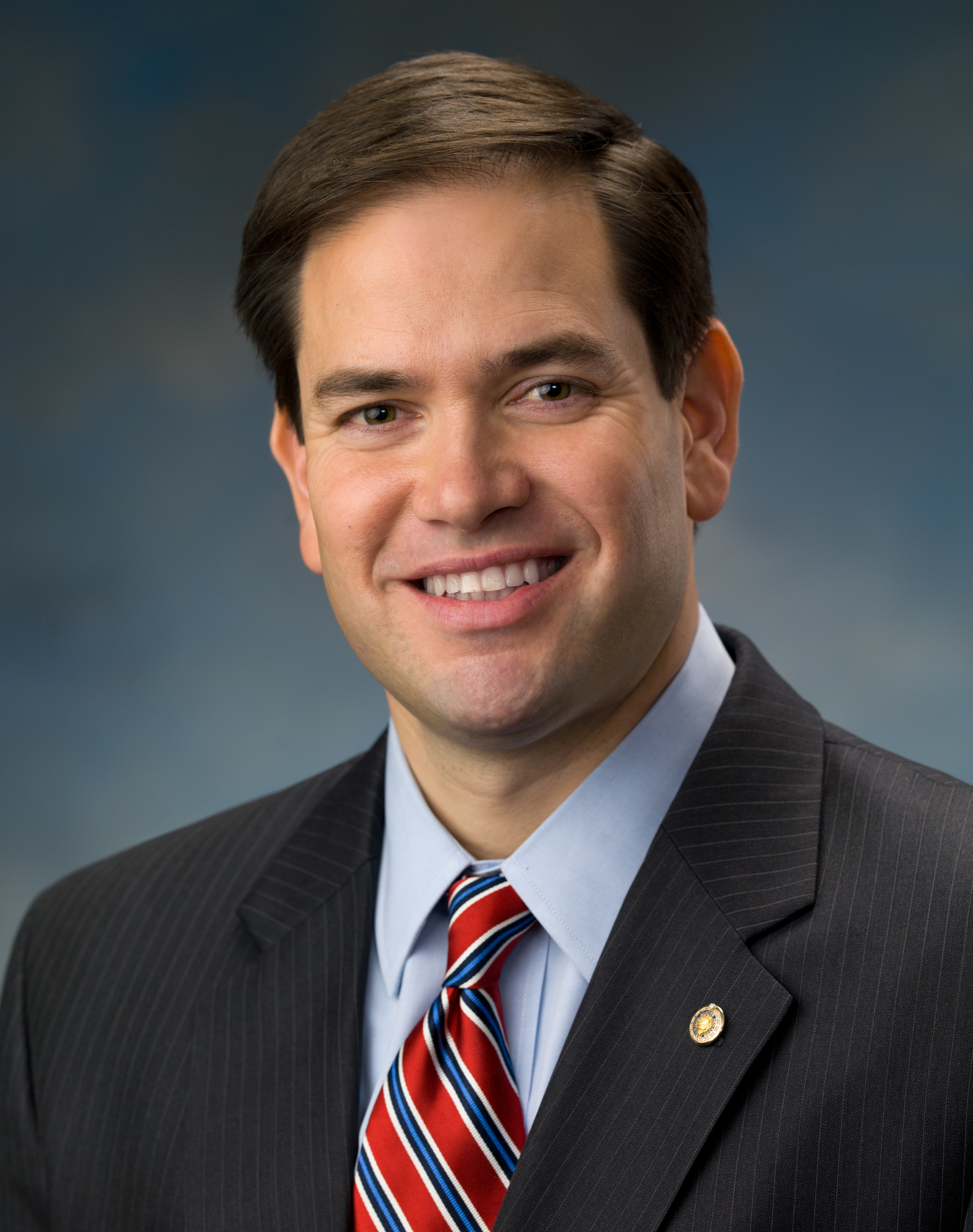
Marco Rubio, 72nd United States Secretary of State

- Tomás Regalado (former mayor of Miami)
- Carlos Rendo (mayor of Woodcliff Lake, New Jersey, and 2017 candidate for lieutenant governor)
- Manuel Requena (former member, Los Angeles Board of Supervisors, former mayor of Los Angeles, former trustee, Los Angeles Board of Education)
- David Rivera (former U.S. congressman from Florida, former Florida state representative)
- George Rivera (former Colorado state senator)
- Geraldo Rivera (journalist, attorney, author, political commentator, and former television host)
- Lionel Rivera (former mayor of Colorado Springs, Colorado)
- Ramon Luis Rivera (former mayor of Bayamon, Puerto Rico)
- Ramon Luis Rivera Jr. (mayor of Bayamon, Puerto Rico)
- Thomas Rivera Schatz (president of the Puerto Rico Senate)
- Julio Robaina (Florida state representative)
- Ray Rodrigues (Florida state representative)
- Ana Rodriguez (Florida state senator)
- Anthony Rodriguez (Florida state representative)
- Jessie Rodriguez (Wisconsin state representative)
- Paul Rodriguez (actor)
- Xavier Rodriguez (judge, United States Court of Appeals for the Fourth Western District of Texas)
- Rachel Rodriguez-Williams (Wyoming state representative)
- Cesar Romero (actor, singer, dancer, active in Republican campaigns beginning in 1960)
- Ileana Ros-Lehtinen (former U.S. Congresswoman from Florida; first Cuban-American woman in Congress)
- Larry Rubin (Mexican-American, president and chairman of The American Society of Mexico, chairman of Republicans Abroad in Mexico
- Jeanette Dousdebes Rubio (former Miami Dolphins cheerleader, active in Republican political action committees)
- Marco Rubio (72nd United States Secretary of State, former U.S. senator from Florida, former speaker of the Florida State House of Representatives)

== S ==
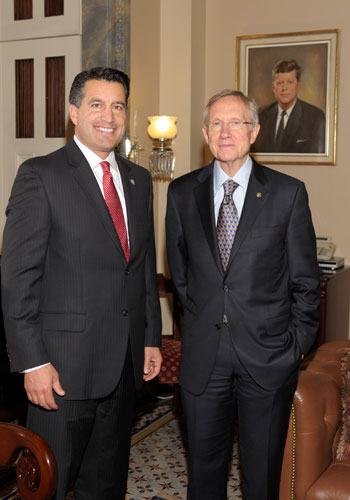
Brian Sandoval, left, 29th governor of Nevada

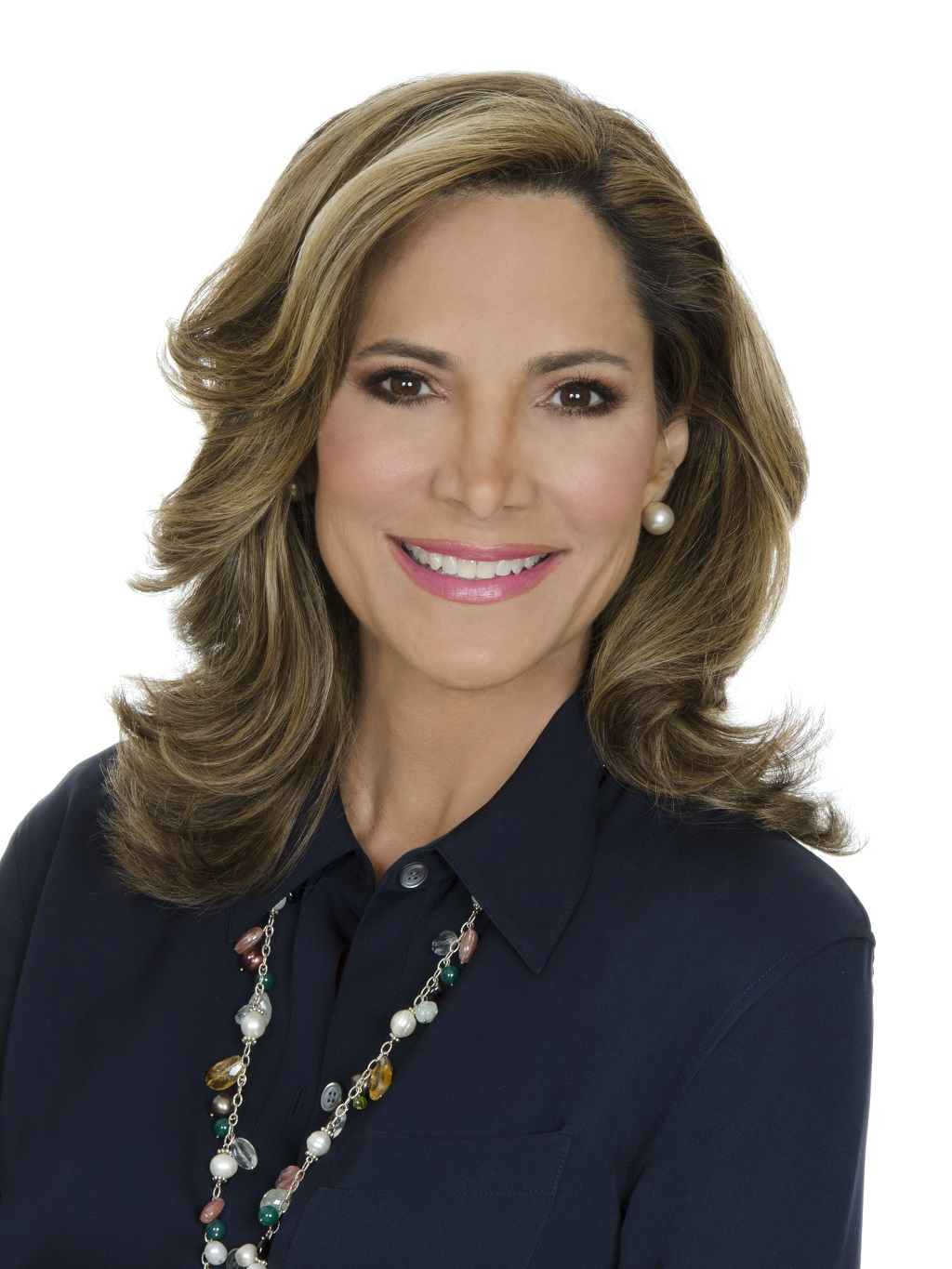
Maria Salazar, member of the U.S. House of Representatives from Florida's 27th district

- Felix Sabates (businessman and philanthropist)
- Maria Salazar (U.S. representative from Florida)
- Tim Salazar (Wyoming State Senate)
- John Sanchez (former lieutenant governor, state representative and gubernatorial nominee in New Mexico)
- Leslie Sanchez (political pundit)
- Orlando Sanchez (Treasurer of Harris County, Texas)
- Brian Sandoval (former governor of Nevada, U.S. Attorney and Nevada attorney general)
- Evelyn Sanguinetti (former lieutenant governor of Illinois)
- David Santiago (Florida state representative)
- Jorge Santini (former mayor of San Juan, Puerto Rico)
- Jon Secada (singer and songwriter)
- Louis E. Sola (commissioner of the U.S. Federal Maritime Commission)
- Francis Suarez (mayor of Miami)
- Chris Sununu (governor of New Hampshire)
- John E. Sununu (former United States senator and congressman from New Hampshire)
- John H. Sununu (former governor of New Hampshire and White House Chief of Staff)
- Libby Szabo (Colorado state representative)

== T ==
- Michele Tafoya (former sportscaster, active in Republican governor campaign in Minnesota)
- Enrique Tarrio (Florida chairman of Latinos for Trump and chairman of the Proud Boys)
- Tito the Builder (Tito Munoz, construction company owner, conservative activist, radio show host, member, Virginia State Board of Housing and Community Development)
- Jackie Toledo (Florida state representative)
- Randy Torres (Arkansas state representative)
- Carlos Trujillo (Florida state representative)

== V ==
- Wanda Vázquez Garced (governor of Puerto Rico)
- Raul Danny Vargas (businessman, media commentator and political activist)
- Jaci Velasquez (singer)
- Eduardo Verastegui (actor, model, singer, anti-abortion activist, presidential adviser)
- Barbara Vucanovich (US representative from Nevada; first Latina woman elected to Congress)

== See also ==
- Congressional Hispanic Conference
- List of American conservatives
- List of Latin Americans
- Republican National Hispanic Assembly
- Latino conservatism in the United States
