= Charles Patrick Garcia =

American businessman and banker

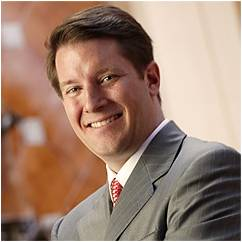
- Charles Patrick Garcia
- Born: February 28, 1961 (age 65)
- Military career
- Allegiance: United States of America
- Branch: United States Air Force
- Nickname: Charlie

Charles Patrick García (born February 28, 1961) is an American businessman and banker. He started Garcia Trujillo LLC, a consulting, merchant banking, and venture capital firm where he was the CEO. In June 2014, García was selected to lead the Association of Latino Professionals for America (ALPFA, Inc.).

== Biography ==
García was born in Washington, D.C., to parents Carlos A. Garcia, a Panamanian surgeon, and Marilyn McCarthy Garcia. Shortly after he was born, the family moved to Panama City, Panama. He grew up in Panama City and graduated from Balboa High School, the American Canal Zone high school, in 1979. He obtained a bachelor's degree from the United States Air Force Academy in 1983.

From 1983 to 1988, as an Air Force junior officer, García served in staff officer assignments for U.S. Strategic Air Command at Offutt Air Force Base, Nebraska, and at the United States Southern Command then located in Panama. During this period, García earned a master's degree in public administration from the University of Oklahoma.

In 1988, García received a one-year appointment to serve as one of fourteen White House Fellows for the 1988–1989 term. As a Fellow, García was first assigned to work on the staff of the Department of State, then, several months later, to the Office of National Drug Control Policy. Following his term in Washington, García returned to Air Force staff duty until he left active service in 1990.

In 1994, García obtained a Juris Doctor degree from Columbia Law School.

Charles Patrick García resides in Boca Raton, Florida. He was married to Allison Holtzman in 1993. He has three children. The couple divorced in 2005, and he remarried Cristina Avila from Quito, Ecuador.

== Early business career ==
In 1994, García was appointed co-manager of his former father in law's $60 million "Thrift Value Fund," based in Palm Beach County, and later as manager of at least two other investment funds of lesser value. By the time he terminated Thrift Value Fund relationship in late 1997, García was working at the Greenberg Traurig law firm in Miami, advising banks and Savings and Loans institutions.

== Sterling Financial Investment Group ==
In 1997, with $800,000 in personal funds and seed money from family and friends, García bought assets of Agora Securities of Miami and relocated it to a Mizner Park office in Boca Raton. With two other associates, Alexis C. Korybut and John Curry, García founded the "Sterling Financial Investment Group (SFIG)." An original goal of SFIG was to provide financial services to the U.S. and overseas Hispanic market by partnering with small banks to set up their stock sales and insurance operations. Sterling provided a means of clearing stock trades using García's relationship with brokerage giant, Bear Stearns & Co.

García also focused his business on providing private placement services for large investors. Stock market research focusing on the healthcare and biotechnology sectors was a core feature of Sterling Financial Investment Group. Sterling advertised itself as being one of the few investment advisors willing to issue "sell" recommendations. Using this model of combining investment research and partnership with small banks, García led his company on a path of aggressive growth, opening offices in a large number of U.S and overseas locations. In 2000, García established the "Sterling Financial Group of Companies" under Sterling Financial Holdings, Inc. Sterling Financial then had three operating subsidiaries:

- Sterling Financial Investment Group, Inc., a broker-dealer subsidiary firm providing financial services,
- myPrivates.com, Inc., an Internet subsidiary providing online networking to entrepreneurs seeking venture capital, and investors searching for private placement opportunities, and
- Sterling Financial Insurance Group, Inc., a wholly owned insurance company encompassing a nationwide network of 225 insurance agents.

The creation of myPrivates.com, Inc. in 2000 cost over $5 million. Also in 2000, García struck a deal for almost $3 million to hire 140 brokers from the recently bankrupt Boca Raton-based Joseph Charles & Associates. To finance this expansion, particularly for the creation of the myPrivates.com subsidiary, García completed two funding rounds of private placement venture capital funding that raised a total of $8 million. Crossbow Ventures, based in Florida's Palm Beach County, was the lead investor in both funding rounds. As a result of the transactions, Crossbow Ventures obtained a minority equity stake in Sterling.

By 2001, SFIG claimed a worldwide network of more than 400 independent agents working out of more than 50 offices in the United States and eight offices in other countries including Panama, Spain, Chile, Greece and England. In the years 2001 and 2000, Sterling Financial Investment Group was named by the University of Florida Fischer School of Accounting as the number one fastest-growing privately held firms in the State as well as the fastest-growing minority owned firm in Florida. In mid-2002, the firm earned state certification as a Minority Business Enterprise (MBE) which helped attract larger companies wanting to include minority firms as part of their syndicate offerings.

In August 2002, Hispanic Business magazine named Sterling the number one fastest-growing Hispanic company in the United States and it made Inc. Magazines "Inc 500 List" as the #8 fastest-growing privately held company in the United States. García received the "Outstanding Business Leader" award by Northwood University. In December 2004, García was selected by Hispanic magazine for the "Entrepreneur of the Year" award. Sterling Financial Investment Group issued a number of press releases between 1998 and 2003 that described an explosive rate of revenue growth, shown below. However, the company never reported profit.

Year	Reported revenue
1997	$100,000
1998	$800,000
1999	$4.2 million
2000	$14 million
2001	$16.3 million
2002	$24 million
2003	$31 million
2004	$28 million

By 2003, García recognized that the myPrivates.com, Inc., Internet subsidiary, was unsuccessful and had to be closed. Sterling Financial was then seeking outside investors to provide a cash infusion to continue to fuel expansion in the remaining businesses. This effort was hampered by a string of adverse regulatory findings. From 2002 to 2005, García's company, without admitting or denying any allegations, accepted six fines totaling $456,000 for NASD rule violations. Reported problems included issuing research reports that contained errors and exaggerations, lax record keeping, and weak monitoring of branch offices.

Sterling was also named in a 2004 lawsuit launched in Texas by a number of disgruntled investors of DOBI Medical Systems. Sterling was an underwriter or agent in four DOBI stock sales prior to a 2004 private placement offering. From 2000 through 2004, Sterling also selected one member of DOBI's board of directors. In the DOBI lawsuit, plaintiffs, mostly from Texas, maintain they were defrauded of several million dollars after they bought stock in DOBI in a 2004 private placement offering in which Sterling was the placement agent.

García closed the Sterling Financial Investment Group's research division in April 2005. In June 2005, Sterling sold its 30 independent brokerage offices in 20 states to Pointe Capital of Delray Beach for about $1 million. Finally, in May 2006, Sterling sold its remaining assets to vFinance, Inc., located in Boca Raton, for $3.4 million. As part of the sales transaction, vFinance agreed to hire García at an annual salary of $262,000. Since vFinance bought the assets of Sterling Financial and not the company, lawyers expected vFinance not to face any liability in the Texas suit. vFinance was then under CEO Tim Mahoney. Following Mahoney's election to U.S. Representative for Florida's 16th congressional district, Leonard J. Sokolow took over as CEO and board chairman of vFinance, Inc. Under Sokolow, García serves as President of the Sterling Hispanic Markets Capital Group.

vFinance, Inc. is a publicly traded company that has grown to more than $1 billion in assets since its founding in 1997. "In July 2005 vFinance cracked SouthFloridaCEO's South Florida 500 list as one of the Top 100 Public Companies in the region, posting $26.3 million in revenue for 2004. That was up slightly from $24.5 million in 2003."

== ALPFA, Inc. ==
García was selected as CEO of ALPFA, Inc in June 2014. ALPFA changed their acronym to Association of Latino Professionals For America, and the tagline was changed to read "Empowering Latino Leaders".

== Other involvement ==
- While in law, García published an article in the Columbia Law Review that was cited by the Florida Supreme Court.
- During the 23-day launch of the Iraq war, he was Telemundo's behind-the-desk military expert. After the 9/11 attacks, García's company issued press releases seeking to have him invited to comment on the threat from biological warfare, and he soon made appearances discussing the issue. He has been featured as the cover story in numerous magazines and newspaper articles, and his opinion editorials have been carried by newspapers and magazines. He has appeared on CNN's Crossfire (TV series), Paula Zahn Now, Telemundo, and other news talk shows.
- From June 2001 to December 2004, Florida Governor Jeb Bush appointed García as the only Hispanic to the seven member State Board of Education, a government entity responsible for overseeing all education delivery systems in the state with an annual budget exceeding $15 billion. In February 2002, he was appointed by President George W. Bush to the President's Advisory Commission on Educational Excellence for Hispanic Americans, charged with developing a blueprint to close the educational gap for Hispanic children. On the commission, he chaired its Public Awareness Committee.
- In October 2003, García authored a book on leadership and motivation, titled A Message From Garcia, published by John Wiley & Sons, and simultaneously released in English and Spanish. Jaime Escalante, whose life as a calculus teacher in East LA's Garfield High School was made into the movie Stand and Deliver wrote the foreword to the book. The book was ranked #1 business book on Amazon.com and # 6 on The Wall Street Journal's bestseller list and The New York Times reviewed it.
- García was identified by Hispanic Magazine as one of the "100 most influential Hispanics in the United States," and Hispanic Today magazine featured García in a cover story "Committing to Hispanic America" and Univision television selected him for their series "Orgullo Hispano". In September 2004, Grupo Santillana published Hispanics in the USA: Making History where he was chosen as one of the 14 Hispanic role models for the nation. In May 2006, author Lionel Sosa published Think and Grow Rich: A Latino Choice (Ballantine Books) which also featured him as a role model in the business world for Latino entrepreneurs.
- In 2005, President George W. Bush appointed him to the United States Air Force Academy Board of Visitors which overseas all operations at the military academy. In November 2006, he was elected Board Chairman. He now serves on the Board of Directors of the Association of Graduates, where he is Chairman of the Finance Committee; and also served as Chair of the Strategic Communications Committee.
- García is a regular contributor to political campaigns. From 1999 to 2004 he is listed as personally contributing a total of $11,000 to various presidential and congressional candidates and Political Action Committees. He, and former wife Allison, are listed as contributing $2,000 each to the 2004 campaign of George W. Bush. García was also a Bush Pioneer for the 2004 reelection campaign, raising at least $100,000 in contributions.
- García was on the Board of Directors of Winn-Dixie when it was a public company before its bankruptcy and subsequent sale to BI-LO Holdings.
- In May 2009, García authored a second leadership book, Leadership Lessons of the White House Fellows: Learn How to Inspire Others, Achieve Greatness, and Find Success in Any Organization published by McGraw-Hill which compiles leadership lessons from interviews of over 200 White House Fellows.
- García currently serves on the National Board of Directors for Girl Scouts of the United States of America.
