= Rosario Marin =

American politician (born 1958)

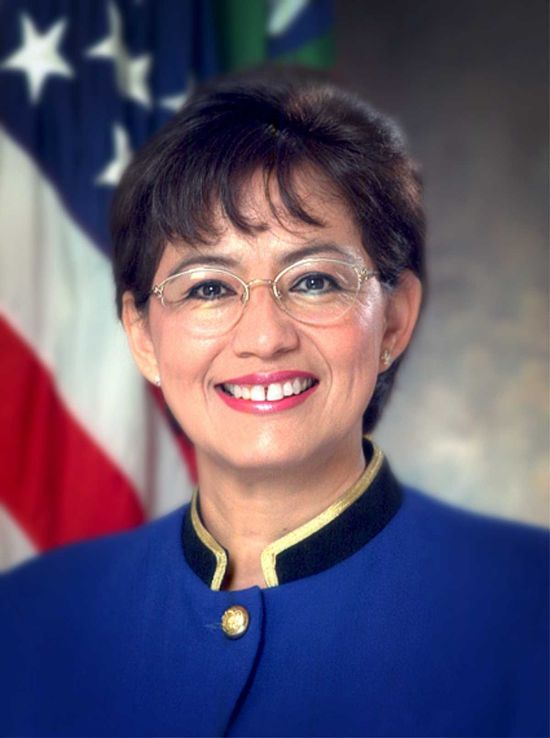
- Official Portrait

41st Treasurer of the United States
- In office August 16, 2001 – June 30, 2003
- President: George W. Bush
- Preceded by: Mary Ellen Withrow
- Succeeded by: Anna Escobedo Cabral

Mayor of Huntington Park, California
- In office 1999–2000
- Preceded by: Tom Jackson
- Succeeded by: Jessica R. Maes

Member of Huntington Park City Council
- In office 1994–2001

Personal details
- Born: Rosario Spindola; August 4, 1958 (age 68) Mexico City, Mexico
- Party: Republican
- Spouse: Alvaro Marin (m. 1980)
- Children: 3
- Education: East Los Angeles College; California State University, Los Angeles (BS)

Rosario Marin (born August 4, 1958) is a Mexican-American politician who served as the 41st Treasurer of the United States from August 16, 2001, to June 30, 2003, serving under President George W. Bush. She is the first person since William Clark to assume the post without having been born a United States citizen. She is the only foreign-born Treasurer of the United States.

== Early life ==
Marin was born Rosario Spindola in Mexico City, Mexico. Her father Mariano, a worker in a label-making factory in California, brought his family to the United States in 1972 on visas provided by his employer. The move was initially resisted by Marin due to her upcoming quinceañera and her fear of leaving behind her customs and traditions. Marin's family settled in Huntington Park, California where her father obtained work as a janitor and her mother as a seamstress. They returned briefly to their old home in Mexico to celebrate a "small fiesta" in her honor.

Her poor command of English was another reason that Marin had resisted coming to the U.S. In high school, she was given an IQ test on which she scored a 27 out of 100 and was subsequently labelled as mentally disabled. This low score inspired Marin to work hard to learn the language which she accomplished in part by listening to songs on the radio and repeating the words. By 1976, she was in the top 20 out of a class of 500 and graduated with honors.

Marin's family had initially wanted her to forgo any further education and get a job in order to help out the family financially as well as help her mother care for her siblings. Marin compromised by working during the day and attending East Los Angeles College at night. After graduating in 1980, she continued to take night classes at the Los Angeles campus of the California State University (CSULA). Marin graduated from CSULA in 1983 with a Bachelor of Science in Business Administration.

== Public service ==
=== Advocacy in the Wilson Administration ===
Marin originally embarked upon a business and financial career. While attending CSULA, she had obtained work in 1981 at City National Bank in Beverly Hills as an assistant receptionist. After several promotions, Marin was poised for elevation to assistant vice president of the bank. However, in 1985 her son Eric was born with Down syndrome and she quit her job the following year in order to care for him. She also withdrew from an MBA program in which she was enrolled.

Her son's condition inspired Marin to become an advocate for the mentally disabled. During this time, she founded the first support group for Latino parents with Down's children as well as Fuerza ("Force"), an organization dedicated to providing services and support to mentally disabled children, and lobbied state officials in Sacramento on their behalf. It was also during this time, while counseling pregnant women with disabled children, that Marin became a supporter of abortion rights.

Marin's efforts came to the notice of state officials and, in 1992, she was appointed the chief of Legislative Affairs for the Department of Developmental Services by Governor Pete Wilson. At DDS, Marin worked for legislation to benefit the mentally challenged. Two years later, Marin was named chair of the Council on Developmental Disabilities where she continued to advocate for the mentally disabled and their families. For her work on behalf of the mentally disabled, Marin received the "Rose Fitzgerald Kennedy Prize" by the United Nations in 1995, the second person to receive the award.

Finally, in 1996, Marin was appointed the assistant deputy director for the Department of Social Services.

=== Political career ===
In addition to her public advocacy work, Marin became politically involved. She had been influenced to join the Republican Party (GOP) by her boss at City National after she naturalized in 1984. Additionally, Marin was inspired by what she felt she shared with the ideology of President Ronald Reagan: "Personal responsibility. Small government. Strong national defense."

In 1994, while still working in the Wilson Administration, Marin ran for a city council seat in Huntington Park and won. She served seven years on the council, including a term as mayor from 1999 to 2000 – the first Hispanic to hold that post in the city's history. During her tenure, Marin was known as a law-and-order politician and was credited with various public safety initiatives that reformed the police department, increased its funding, and reduced crime by 50%. She also instituted a task force to combat air pollution in response to a government study that listed Huntington Park as one of several communities particularly at risk and launched a crackdown on a black market for illegal documentation. Despite her political registration, Marin was overwhelmingly re-elected to the council in 1999.

Marin was also known for being a tough and, sometimes, divisive participant of council meetings. Opponents accused her of raucous behavior, while even allies acknowledged a certain arrogance. In 2000, she was censured by the council for being rude toward fellow councilmembers and citizens alike. Critics also accused her of missing council meetings and misusing her travel budget. Her improbable victory, they point out, was due to "misrepresenting her true political leanings" and a "savvy use of the Spanish media."

Marin continued to work for Governor Wilson for the first few years of her time on the council. In 1997, she was named deputy director of the governor's Office of Community Relations in Los Angeles. As the public face of the Administration to Hispanics, Marin had to deal with the tricky subject of Proposition 187 and other anti-illegal immigration topics which were the subject of heated debate among the community. 187 was particularly unpopular in Huntington Park – a city Marin herself referred to as "the most Mexican city outside Mexico." While personally opposed to the controversial measure, Marin was called upon by the Administration to defend its position in support.

During this time, Marin served as an officer on several commissions such as president of the Mayors and Councils Department of the League of California Cities, vice-chair of the Latino Caucus, and chair of the Southeast Community Development Corporation. She was also a member of various boards such as the California Film Commission, the Special Olympics, and the National Association of Latino Elected Officials and in 1998 completed the John F. Kennedy School of Government's program for senior executives in state and local government. In her last two years in office, Marin concurrently worked for AT&T Corporation as Public Relations Manager for the Hispanic Market in the Southern California Region.

Marin continued to bolster her Republican credentials. At the state level, she served as a California delegate to the 1996 Republican National Convention. She was also a vice-president of the California Republican National Hispanic Assembly.

On the national scene, Marin was an ardent supporter of George W. Bush's presidential run in 2000. While mayor, she had met the Texas governor and volunteered in his campaign effort in California working on Hispanic outreach and acting as its Spanish-speaking surrogate. Her reputation and skill in the community was realized by Republican operatives and Marin's political cachet within the Party increased dramatically. Shortly after his election, Marin was featured prominently among the president-elect's circle.

In April, 2001, President Bush nominated Marin for the post of U.S. Treasurer. She was confirmed by the U.S. Senate on August 3 and resigned from her city council post three days later.

== U.S. Treasurer ==
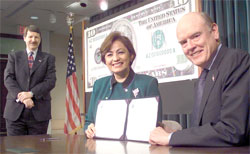
Treasury Secretary John Snow and Treasurer Rosario Marin, 2003

Marin was sworn in on August 16, 2001. Treasury Secretary Paul O'Neill presided over the ceremony. She became the highest ranking Latina to serve in President Bush's Administration and, as such, was often called upon to represent it before the Hispanic community.

In addition to the Treasurer's traditional duties of overseeing the U.S. Mint and the Bureau of Engraving and Printing, Marin's tenure included organizing the Department’s first financial education outreach efforts. She also served as a member of the new Partnership for Prosperity efforts between the United States and Mexico. Marin was particularly concerned with educating young people on the importance of building and maintaining financial stability. She also served as a designee to the President's Advisory Commission on Educational Excellence for Hispanic Americans on behalf of Treasury Secretary John W. Snow.

Like previous U.S. treasurers, Marin continued to make numerous appearances on behalf of the Department, providing it with its public face. On June 15, 2002, she served as the keynote speaker at the commencement ceremony of her alma mater, CSULA, where she received an honorary Doctorate of Law degree and continued to garner praise for her achievements. That same year, she was awarded the "Groundbreaking Latina of the Year" award by Catalina magazine.

By April, 2003, speculation began circulating that Marin would soon return to California and become a GOP candidate to challenge U.S. senator Barbara Boxer in the upcoming 2004 electoral cycle. At a speech to Californians in Washington, reporters noted her attacks against the budget of Gov. Gray Davis.

On May 22, the Treasury Department issued a statement that Marin was resigning her office effective June 30, and was planning to move back to California. Press reports at the time continued to indicate that she would enter the 2004 Senatorial campaign.

=== Founding of NALL ===
Later in the year, Marin co-founded the National Association of Latina Leaders and served as its first chairwoman.

== US Senate campaign ==
Hoping to ride the popular sentiment that toppled Democratic Gov. Davis in the recall election and installed Republican moderate Arnold Schwarzenegger in his place, Marin officially became a candidate for the Republican nomination to the US Senate on December 2. In a half-hour speech before a hometown crowd in Huntington Park, Marin painted herself as a moderate while at the same time embracing certain key conservative Republican issues such as national security and low taxes. During the ensuing campaign, she would continue to walk a political tightrope, trying to stress her centrist philosophy while not alienating the party's conservative base.

Highlighting her Republican credentials, Marin evoked rhetoric of Ronald Reagan, proclaimed her support for President Bush's $726 billion tax cut, and gave tough speeches about Mexico. At the Richard Nixon Library in Yorba Linda in February 2004, Marin called for tougher US pressure on Mexico in her first major policy speech of the campaign, including adjusting existing treaties in order to deport criminal aliens. At the same time, she emphasized her own immigrant roots, backed the president's immigrant worker program (which was unpopular with conservatives), and voiced her support for civil unions and abortion rights – the latter of which she tempered with opposition to late-term abortions and support of parental consent laws. During the same month of her Mexico speech, Marin utilized Garry South, former advisor of Gov. Davis, to send out a mailer addressing the Republicans' "white male problem" and offering her candidacy as the best chance to defeat Sen. Boxer.

Despite receiving an implied endorsement from the White House as the preferred candidate, Marin was attacked by her fellow Republicans, in particular, former California Secretary of State Bill Jones, the leading candidate for the GOP nod, for her perceived waffling on another hot-button immigration issue: driver's licenses for illegal immigrants. Although she had opposed the state measure granting them signed by Gov. Davis in 2003, she refused to take a position on tough federal legislation to punish states that do so introduced by Congressman Tom Tancredo the same year. Marin was also passed over by key Republicans when Governors Schwarzenegger, her old boss Wilson, and George Deukmejian all endorsed Jones.

Critics placed doubt on Marin's ability to raise the estimated $25 million she would need with relatively little name recognition. Her refusal to elaborate on key policy statements drew further criticism. Democrats, in the meantime, brought up her contentious terms and censure while serving as a city councilwoman and mayor. Democratic California congresswoman Hilda Solis, among others, questioned Marin's claim that she had personally opposed Proposition 187 in 1994 – a problem particularly vexing to the state GOP – saying that she did not do enough to voice that opposition publicly. Marin's attempts at distancing herself from more controversial GOP measures and tacking to the center were dismissed as posturing, and she was labelled by one high-ranking Hispanic Democrat as "a good house Mexican for the Republicans".

By the time of the primary, there were 10 candidates in the GOP race. Despite picking up a substantial number of undecided voters on election day, Marin was unable to overcome GOP frontrunner Jones in name recognition, funding, or popularity among the party. On March 2, she finished second with 20% of the vote compared to Jones' 44%.

== Return to state politics ==
=== Schwarzenegger Administration ===
Following her loss in the race for the US Senate, Governor Schwarzenegger appointed Marin to the Integrated Waste Management Board (IWMB), the state solid waste agency that oversees and regulates recycling. She was sworn in on April 27 and elected chair of the board by her colleagues on September 21.

On January 31, 2006, the governor appointed Marin as secretary of the California State and Consumer Services Agency (CSCSA), an agency responsible for civil rights enforcement, consumer protection and the licensing of 2.3 million Californians in more than 230 different professions. On September 7, she received a "Lifetime Achievement Award" during the League of California Cities 108th Annual Conference.

In 2007 Rosario published her memoirs, Leading Between Two Worlds: Lessons from the First Mexican-Born Treasurer of the United States. Editorial Santillana published the Spanish version the following year. On May 10, 2008, Marin received an honorary doctorate for her achievements from Woodbury University.

Marin continued to work on behalf of the Republican Party and was a featured speaker at the 2008 Republican National Convention, addressing the crowd on September 4. The previous day, she joined several other prominent Republican women in denouncing what they considered unfair attacks on vice presidential candidate, Gov. Sarah Palin by the media, bloggers, and the Democratic Party. Marin particularly noted her connection to Palin by virtue of their both having children with Downs.

In February 2009 Marin was the keynote speaker at the California Sustainability Alliance's 2008 Sustainability Showcase Awards where she discussed transforming the market through the implementation of California’s Green Building Initiative.

=== Stealth lobbying campaign ===
Later that same year, Marin was linked to a secret "stealth lobbying campaign" waged by Freddie Mac to influence federal regulation legislation in 2006. According to documents obtained by the Associated Press, the firm had utilized an influential lobbying agency for which she worked, the DCI Group, to target key Republican Senators. The goal of the campaign was to defeat a bill by Sen. Chuck Hagel (R-NE) that would have overhauled the mortgage industry, including Freddie Mac and Fannie Mae.

In January, 2006, Marin had given an address in Helena, Montana, speaking out against Hagel's Senate Bill 190 claiming that it was too far-reaching and would make it more difficult for people with low-incomes to become homeowners. "They will no longer be able to do what they have been doing," she said referring to the mortgage industry giants.

Marin's office confirmed that her visits to Montana and Missouri at that time were in association with her work for DCI. Sen. Conrad Burns (R-MT) came out against the bill which failed at the end of the 109th session of Congress as did eight of the remaining 16 senators targeted by the campaign.

=== Ethics violations ===
On March 5, 2009, Marin resigned her position as head of the CSCSA after inquiries by the Los Angeles Times into speaker's fees she had received and as the paper was preparing to publish a story concerning an ongoing investigation into her activities by the California Fair Political Practices Commission (CFPPC). A spokesman for Governor Schwarzenegger released a statement that Marin had violated administration policy that prohibits public officials from receiving speaker's fees. Marin later fired back stating that "administration officials knew what she was doing and never advised her to stop."

The Times story and CFPPC investigation revealed that between April 2004 and the end of 2007, Marin had received in excess of $50,000 for various speaking engagements through the American Program Bureau lecture agency. Additionally, forms filed by a firm established by her and her husband, Marin and Marin, LLC, indicated that she received between $10,000 and $100,000 in speaking fees. The CFPPC was particularly concerned with $15,000 Marin received from the drug company Pfizer in 2007 which was simultaneously lobbying the Board of Pharmacy, a regulatory panel under her jurisdiction, and $13,500 from Bristol-Myers Squibb in 2008 when it was likewise lobbying agencies she oversaw. Marin countered that most of the speeches were "inspirational" in nature and that she had kept the governor's office and state senate informed since her appointment to the IWMB. The CFPPC had initially launched its investigation after a routine review found that Marin had listed her speaking engagement fees as income.

In June, Marin settled with the CFPPC, admitting to three ethics violations of state law. Although she was subject to a $15,000 penalty, Marin's fine was reduced to $5,400 after the Commission accepted her position that she had received "bad legal advice" from state attorneys and had kept the administration informed. Schwarzenegger's office maintained that they were unaware of her speaking engagement fees.

== Family ==
Marin married Alvaro "Alex" Marin, an immigrant from Nicaragua, in the early 1980s. Her husband also graduated from CSULA, obtaining a Sociology degree in 1979. As of 2002, he was working for the city of Los Angeles as a system analyst. She has two sons and a daughter. One of her sons, Eric, was born with Down syndrome.

== Awards ==
In 2003, Marin was awarded an honorary Doctor of Humane Letters (L.H.D.) degree from Whittier College.

== See also ==
- List of Latino Republicans

== Footnotes ==
Political offices
Preceded by Mary Ellen Withrow	Treasurer of the United States; 2001-2003	Succeeded by Anna Escobedo Cabral
