= Leslie Sanchez =

American author and political pundit (born 1971)

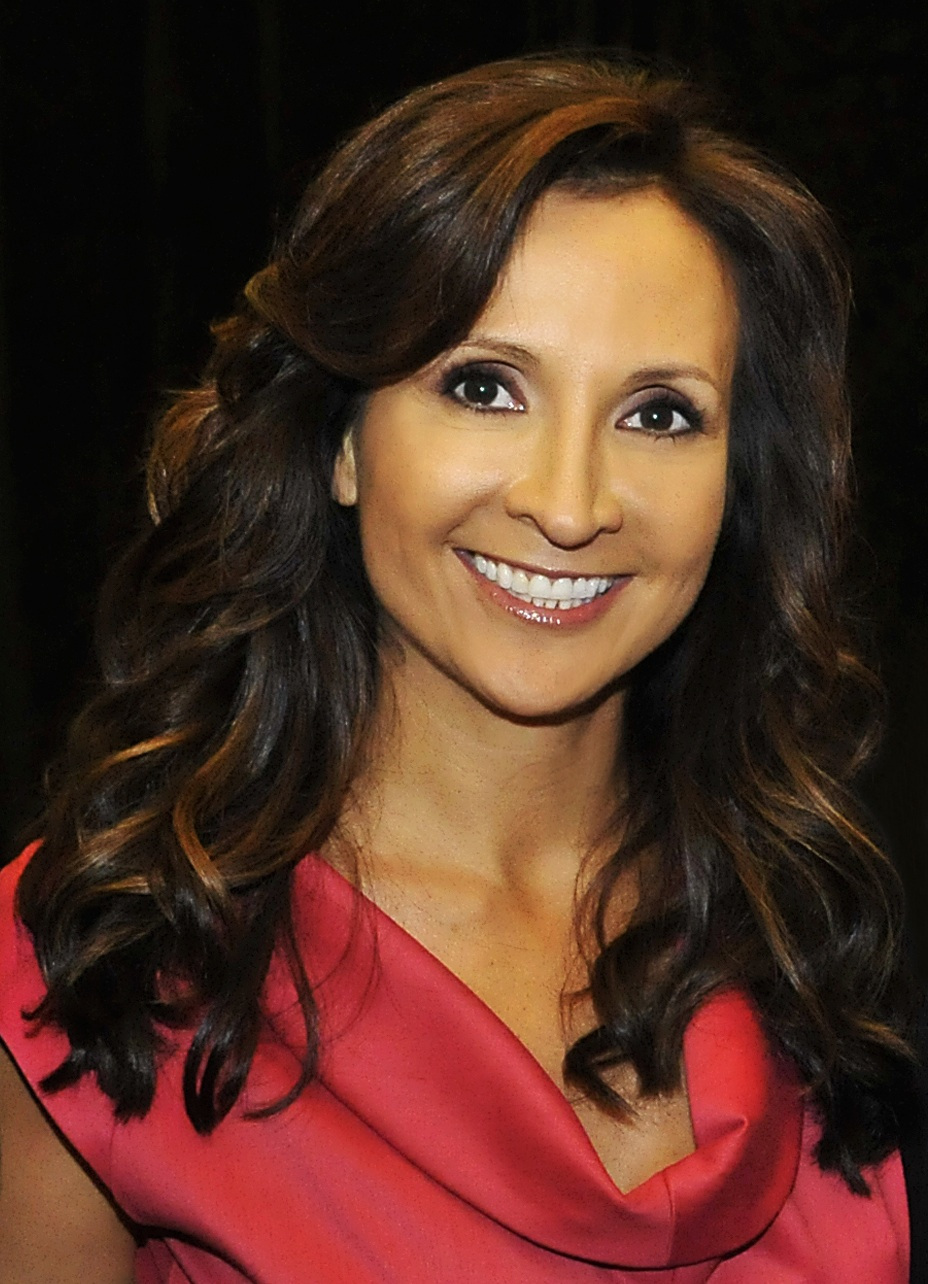
- Official Portrait

5th Executive Director, White House Initiative on Educational Excellence for Hispanic Americans
- In office May 29, 2001 – June 25, 2003
- President: George W. Bush
- Preceded by: Sarita E. Brown
- Succeeded by: Adam Chavarria

Personal details
- Born: 1971 Corpus Christi, Texas
- Party: Republican

Leslie Sanchez (born 1971, Corpus Christi, Texas) is an American author, political pundit affiliated with the Republican Party, and founder/CEO of Impacto Group LLC, a Washington, D.C.–based market research and consulting firm.

== Early life ==
Sanchez was born in Corpus Christi, Texas, and is a third-generation Mexican-American. Sanchez's grandfather came to the United States from Mexico in the early 20th century. Sanchez's parents separated at age 15 and she moved with her mother to an apartment in Sugar Land, a suburb in the Houston metropolitan area. Sanchez took a job during high school to assist her family with finances.

After high school, Sanchez sold Collier's encyclopedias door to door. In four years, she worked in 1,000 counties in 23 states. Sanchez was salesperson, eventually advancing to Field Manager and earned money to assist in supporting her family and earning for her college tuition. Sanchez attended George Washington University, graduating in 1997 with a degree in Journalism.

In 2002, Sanchez obtained a Masters in Business Administration from Johns Hopkins University's Carey Business School.

== Political work ==
Sanchez's political work began in the 1990s. While a student at GWU, she volunteered in several campaigns and acquired experience in this field. During this time, Sanchez went to work in the office of Rep. Henry Bonilla, R-TX, as a legislative assistant on appropriations. Sanchez worked on border issues and immigration legislation. After college, Sanchez held several public relations and marketing positions in the Capitol and worked with the staff of House Speaker Dennis Hastert.

In 1999, Sanchez became a deputy press secretary for the Republican National Committee where she developed communication strategies for the Hispanic market and served as the Committee's chief spokesperson to the Hispanic community. The results were tangible: "Until Leslie Sanchez, the Republican Party wasn't talking to Univision," according to one colleague. The following year, Sanchez was asked by the 2000 Bush presidential campaign to work on Hispanic outreach. Together with V. Lance Tarrance, Jr., a Republican pollster, Sanchez was a principal architect for two, "watershed Hispanic surveys," recognized as a thorough, political and cultural survey taken of Hispanic voters.

Additionally, Sanchez helped create a multimillion-dollar RNC marketing campaign aimed toward the Hispanic market in key states during the 2000 election cycle. This program was cited as contributing to Bush receiving 37 percent of the Hispanic vote. This was the highest percentage of Latino vote for a Republican presidential candidate as of that time. In 2001, outgoing RNC chairman Jim Nicholson credited Sanchez, the Committee's Hispanic-voter liaison director, for her role in that effort.

On May 29, 2001, President George W. Bush appointed Sanchez executive director of the White House Initiative on Educational Excellence for Hispanic Americans. Created in 1990 by President George H. W. Bush, the program's mission is to provide advice and guidance to the Secretary of Education on educational issues related to Hispanics and means to address academic excellence and opportunities to the Hispanic community. In her role as director, Sanchez "monitored and evaluated Hispanic participation in education programs in 29 federal departments and agencies." Sanchez created a grassroots alliance of 20,000 students, parents, and educators nationwide, and assembled a strategic coalition of 30 Fortune 500 companies, financial institutions, and government agencies.

Also in 2001, Sanchez was named one of the "100 Most Influential Hispanics" by Hispanic Business and was selected for the 4th Annual Young Hispanic Leaders Program where she earned a diploma at the Universidad Internacional Menéndez Pelayo in Santander, Spain. Around this time, she entered the MBA program at Johns Hopkins University's School of Professional Studies in Business and Education (now extant).

On June 25, 2003, Sanchez resigned her White House Initiative position to form her own consulting firm, Impacto Group, LLC, the "first Republican political strategy and research group aimed solely at the U.S. Hispanic marketplace." Pollster Tarrance joined her as head of research and development for Impacto Strategies, a division of the Group, and chairman of its board of advisors. Impacto also deals with social and economic issues related to women.

== Consultant and commentator ==
Leslie Sanchez
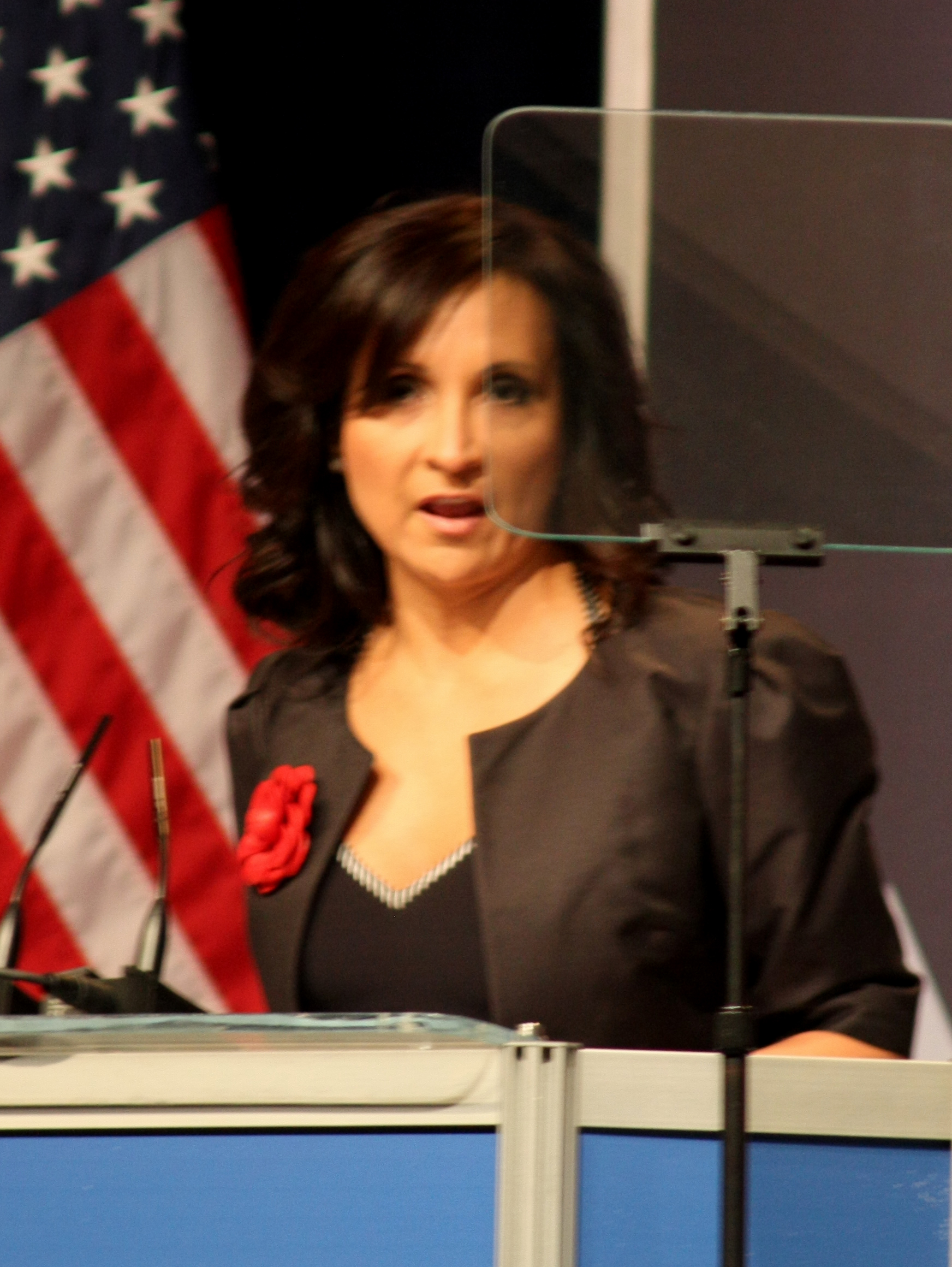
- Leslie Sanchez at CPAC in February 2010
- Born: 1971 (age 54–55); Corpus Christi, Texas, United States
- Education: BA George Washington University MBA Johns Hopkins University
- Occupations: political consultant, political commentator
- Website: Leslie Sanchez, Impacto Group, LLC

At Impacto, Sanchez attained multiple clients, including Cisco Systems and Prudential Financial. Impacto's analytical work has also received attention from political watchers. In 2004, the Independent Women's Forum commissioned a psycholinguistic survey of Hispanic and Caucasian female voters that is considered seminal in the field.

Sanchez mainly operates as a consultant and also on television as a political commentator. Since founding Impacto, she has made appearances on political shows including CNN's The Situation Room, Fox News Channel's O'Reilly Factor, and PBS's The McLaughlin Group, To the Contrary, and The News Hour with Jim Lehrer. Sanchez has been a commentator on Fox and CNN, MSNBC, Telemundo, and Univision.

Sanchez has worked for several election-related projects. In 2004 and 2006, she worked for the BBC as a call-in speaker for their coverage of the presidential and congressional elections. In 2008, she served as a political contributor for CNN's election coverage series. In 2009, CNN was awarded the distinguished Peabody Award for its reporting on the 2008 presidential campaign. Sanchez's commentary is featured in the PBS documentary Latinos 08 which observed the presidential election through from the perspective of Latino voters.

Sanchez has written multiple editorials, opinion pieces, and other articles for various publications, including The Wall Street Journal, The New York Times, The Washington Post, and U.S. News & World Report. Sanchez is credited with authoring two book. Her first, Los Republicanos: Why Republicans and Hispanics Need Each Other, was published in 2007. In it, Sanchez makes the argument that since most Hispanics share core beliefs with the Republican Party (GOP) and represent the fastest growing minority, they should garner more attention. One reviewer described the book as "a proto-type analysis that can be applied to other minority groups in America." Sanchez's second book, You've Come a Long Way, Maybe: Michelle, Sarah, Hillary and the Shaping of the New American Woman, was released in October 2009 by Palgrave Macmillan, a division of St Martin's Press.

Sanchez has been observed as critical of what she perceives as the GOP's patronizing attempts in courting Hispanics since the 2008 elections. Calling the immigration debate, "Prop. 187 on steroids," Sanchez warns that "Republicans embrace anti-immigrant fervor at their own peril." Sanchez expresses that the Party should re-adopt the successful strategies employed by Presidents Ronald Reagan and George W. Bush, who appealed to Hispanics, Sanchez claims, "not as Hispanics or immigrants but as Americans with an equal stake in the future of the country."

== The Apprentice: Martha Stewart ==
In 2005, Sanchez was one of 16 candidates on The Apprentice: Martha Stewart. Already considered a "Latina Martha Stewart" by close associates, she had been encouraged to try out as soon as the show's existence had become known. Sanchez finally relented when she was invited to audition by the GWU Alumni Association. She lasted for 10 of 13 weeks in the competition before finally being ejected.

Despite what some have considered a particularly severe dismissal (Stewart told her that she would rather hire the "doer rather than the talker"), Sanchez preferred in a later interview to focus on Stewart's complimentary remarks regarding her marketing and communication skills. Her appearance on The Apprentice apparently boosted Sanchez's business as well as her fan following.

== Miscellany ==
Among her many activities and honors, past and present, are the following:

- Co-director of the Congressional Border Caucus
- Member, U.S.-Spain Council for the Young Hispanic Leaders Program
- Ex-officio member of the President's Task Force on Puerto Rico's Status
- Hispanic Business magazine's "100 Most Influential Hispanics"
- Member, Women's Business Enterprise National Council
- Board of Directors, Providence Health Foundation
- Johns Hopkins Alumni Association
- The George Washington University Alumni Association
- Visiting Fellow, Independent Women's Forum
- Texas Federation of Republican Women
- Latin Chamber of Commerce
- Albuquerque Hispano Chamber of Commerce
- American Cancer Society Relay for Life

== See also ==
- List of Latino Republicans
