= 1925 =

1925 in various calendars
- Gregorian calendar: 1925; MCMXXV
- Ab urbe condita: 2678
- Armenian calendar: 1374; ԹՎ ՌՅՀԴ
- Assyrian calendar: 6675
- Baháʼí calendar: 81–82
- Balinese saka calendar: 1846–1847
- Bengali calendar: 1331–1332
- Berber calendar: 2875
- British Regnal year: 15 Geo. 5 – 16 Geo. 5
- Buddhist calendar: 2469
- Burmese calendar: 1287
- Byzantine calendar: 7433–7434
- Chinese calendar: 甲子年 (Wood Rat); 4622 or 4415 — to — 乙丑年 (Wood Ox); 4623 or 4416
- Coptic calendar: 1641–1642
- Discordian calendar: 3091
- Ethiopian calendar: 1917–1918
- Hebrew calendar: 5685–5686
- Hindu calendars
- Vikram Samvat: 1981–1982
- Shaka Samvat: 1846–1847
- Kali Yuga: 5025–5026
- Holocene calendar: 11925
- Igbo calendar: 925–926
- Iranian calendar: 1303–1304
- Islamic calendar: 1343–1344
- Japanese calendar: Taishō 14 (大正１４年)
- Javanese calendar: 1855–1856
- Juche calendar: 14
- Julian calendar: Gregorian minus 13 days
- Korean calendar: 4258
- Minguo calendar: ROC 14 民國14年
- Nanakshahi calendar: 457
- Thai solar calendar: 2467–2468
- Tibetan calendar: ཤིང་ཕོ་བྱི་བ་ལོ་ (male Wood-Rat); 2051 or 1670 or 898 — to — ཤིང་མོ་གླང་ལོ་ (female Wood-Ox); 2052 or 1671 or 899

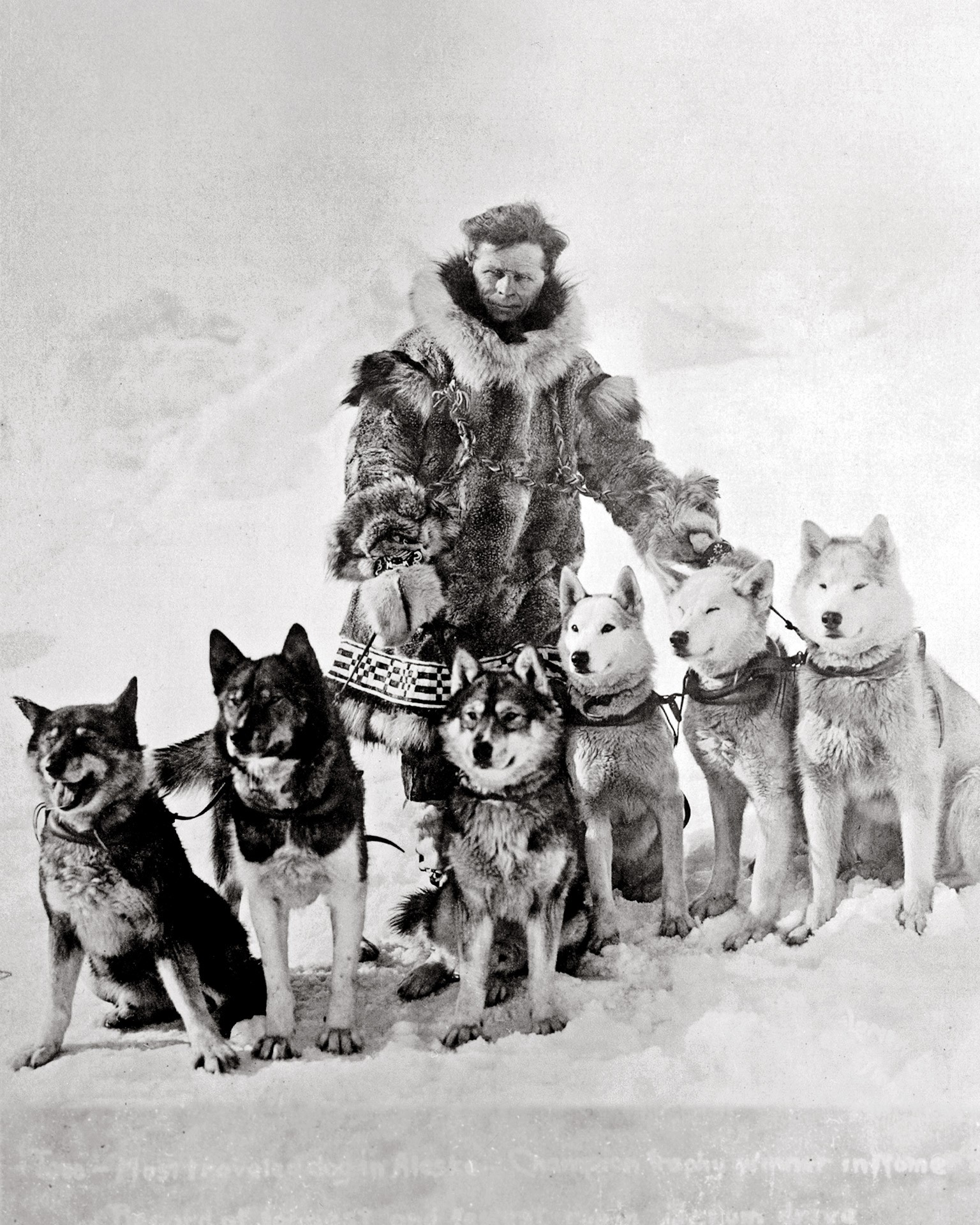
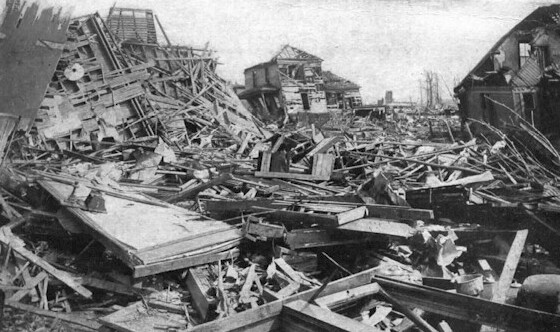
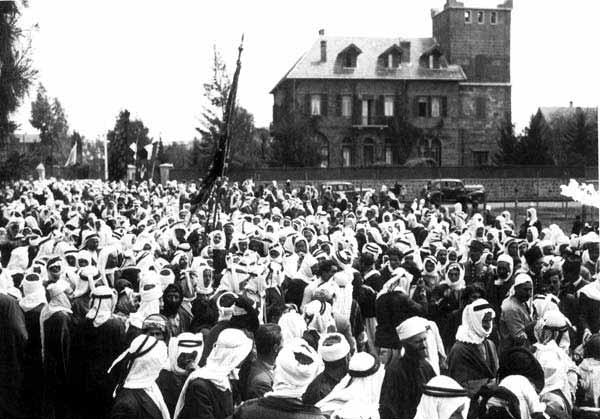
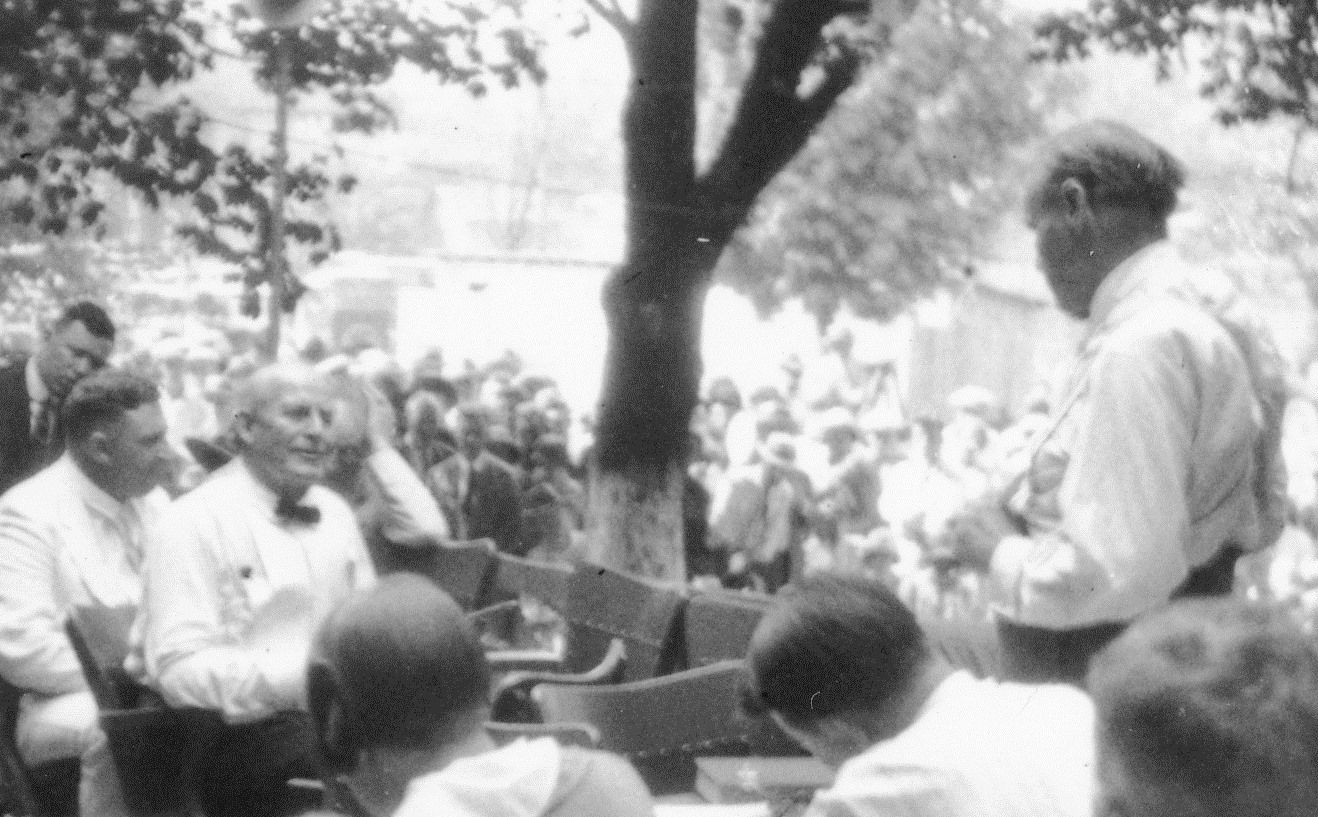
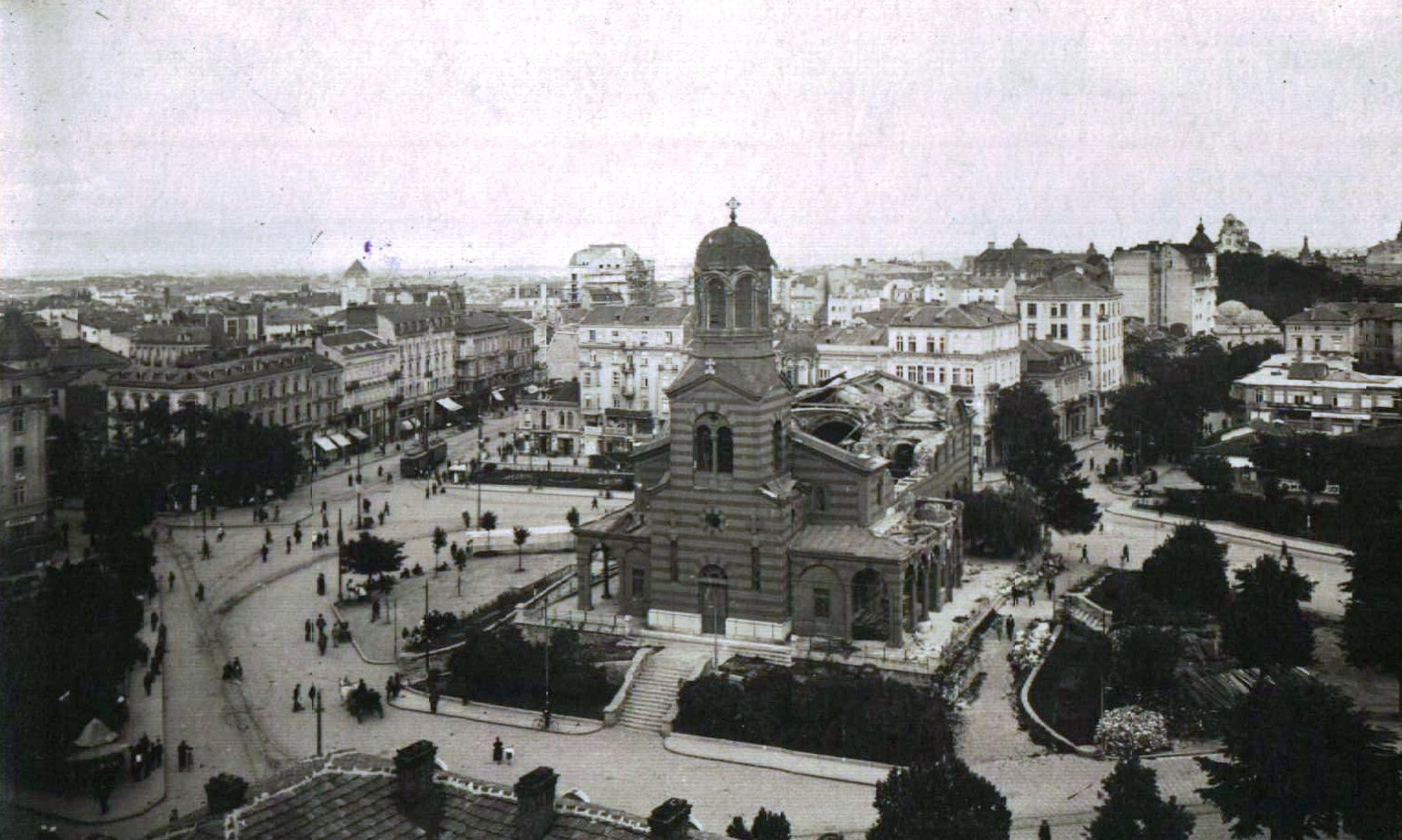
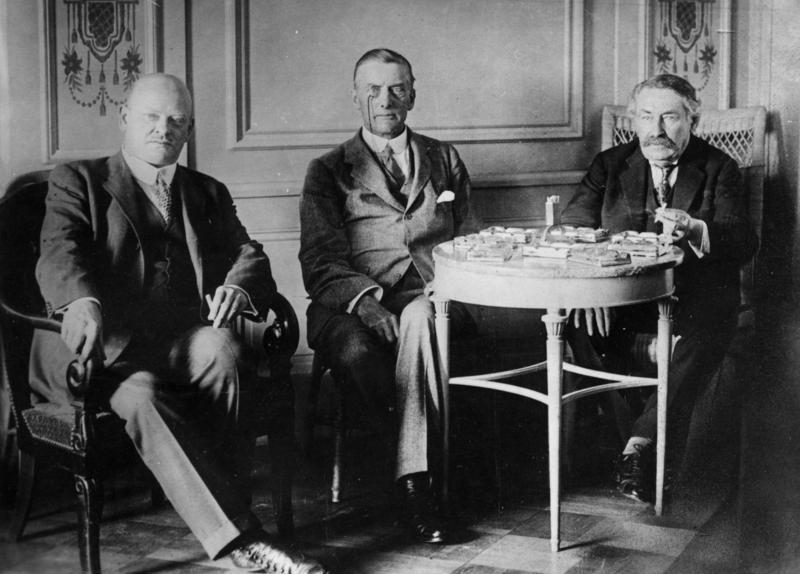
From top to bottom, left to right:
- The 1925 serum run to Nome sees mushers race across Alaska to deliver life-saving diphtheria antitoxin, capturing global attention;
- The deadly 1925 Tri-State tornado sweeps through Missouri, Illinois, and Indiana, killing 695 and becoming the deadliest U.S. tornado;
- The Great Syrian Revolt erupts as Syrian nationalists rise against French rule;
- The Scopes Trial in Tennessee sparks a nationwide debate on evolution and religion in public education;
- The St. Nedelya Church bombing in Sofia, Bulgaria, kills hundreds during a funeral, escalating political violence;
- The Locarno Treaties are signed to secure peace and stabilize postwar borders in Western Europe.

1925 (MCMXXV) was a common year starting on Thursday of the Gregorian calendar, the 1925th year of the Common Era (CE) and Anno Domini (AD) designations, the 925th year of the 2nd millennium, the 25th year of the 20th century, and the 6th year of the 1920s decade.

== Events ==
=== January ===
- January 1 – The Syrian Federation is officially dissolved, the State of Aleppo and the State of Damascus having been replaced by the State of Syria.
- January 3 – Benito Mussolini makes a pivotal speech in the Italian Chamber of Deputies which will be regarded by historians as the beginning of his dictatorship.
- January 5 – Nellie Tayloe Ross becomes the first female governor (Wyoming) in the United States. Fifteen days later, Miriam A. Ferguson becomes first female governor of Texas.
- January 25 – Hjalmar Branting resigns as Prime Minister of Sweden because of ill health, and is replaced by the minister of trade, Rickard Sandler.
- January 27–February 1 – The 1925 serum run to Nome (the "Great Race of Mercy") relays diphtheria antitoxin by dog sled across the U.S. Territory of Alaska to combat an epidemic.

=== February ===
- February 25 – Art Gillham records (for Columbia Records) the first Western Electric masters to be commercially released.
- February 28 – The 1925 Charlevoix–Kamouraska earthquake strikes northeastern North America.

=== March ===
- March 1 – New York City Fire Department Rescue 2 is put in service in Brooklyn.
- March 4 – İsmet İnönü is appointed prime minister in Turkey (Turkey's 4th and İnönü's 3rd government).
- March 6 – Pionerskaya Pravda, one of the oldest children's newspapers in Europe, is founded in the Soviet Union.
- March 9–May 1 – Pink's War: The British Royal Air Force bombards mountain strongholds of Mahsud tribesmen in South Waziristan.
- March 15 – The Phi Lambda Chi fraternity (original name "The Aztecs") is founded on the campus of Arkansas State Teachers' College in Conway, Arkansas (the modern-day University of Central Arkansas).
- March 16 – At 22:42 local time a 7.0 earthquake shakes the Chinese province of Yunnan killing 5,000 people.
- March 18 – The Tri-State Tornado, the deadliest in U.S. history, rampages through Missouri, Illinois and Indiana, killing 695 people and injuring 2,027. It hits the towns of Murphysboro, Illinois; West Frankfort, Illinois; Gorham, Illinois; Ellington, Missouri; and Griffin, Indiana.
- March 21 – Ravel's opera L'enfant et les sortilèges, to a libretto by Colette, is premiered at the Opéra de Monte-Carlo.
- March 31 – The Bauhaus closes in Weimar and moves to a building in Dessau designed by Walter Gropius.

=== April ===
- April–October – The Exposition Internationale des Arts Décoratifs et Industriels Modernes is held in Paris, giving a name to the Art Deco style.
- April 1 – In the United States:
  - Frank Heath and his horse Gypsy Queen leave Washington, D.C. to begin a two-year journey to visit all 48 states.
  - The Patent and Trademark Office is transferred to the Department of Commerce.
- April 10 – F. Scott Fitzgerald's novel The Great Gatsby is published in New York.
- April 15 – Fritz Haarmann, a serial killer convicted of the murder of 24 boys and young men, is guillotined in Germany.
- April 16 – A communist assault on St Nedelya Church claims roughly 150 lives in Sofia, Bulgaria.
- April 19 – Colo-colo, a well-known football club of Chile, is founded in Macul, suburb of Santiago.
- April 20 – Iranian forces of Reza Shah occupy Ahvaz and arrest Sheikh Khazʽal Ibn Jabir.
- April 28 – Presenting the Stanley Baldwin government's budget, Chancellor of the Exchequer Winston Churchill announces Britain's return to the gold standard.

=== May ===
- May 1
  - In the Destruction of early Islamic heritage sites in Saudi Arabia, the al-Baqi' mausoleums are destroyed by King Ibn Saud.
  - Barcelona S.C. founded in Ecuador.
  - The All-China Federation of Trade Unions, the world's largest trade union organisation, is founded in Guangzhou, Republic of China.
- May 5 – The General Election Law is passed in Japan, extending suffrage to all males aged 25 and over.
- May 8 – African-American Tom Lee rescues 32 people from the sinking steamboat M.E. Norman on the Mississippi River.
- May 16 – The first modern performance of Claudio Monteverdi's opera Il ritorno d'Ulisse in patria (1639/40) takes place in Paris.
- May 21 – The opera Doktor Faust, unfinished when composer Ferruccio Busoni died, is premiered in Dresden.
- May 29 – English explorer Percy Fawcett sends a last telegram to his wife before he disappears in the Amazon.

=== June ===
- June 6 – The Chrysler Corporation is founded as an automobile manufacturer by Walter Chrysler in the United States.
- June 13 – American engineer Charles Francis Jenkins achieves the first synchronized transmission of pictures and sound, using 48 lines and a mechanical system in "the first public demonstration of radiovision".
- June 14
  - The Aristotle University of Thessaloniki in Greece is founded.
  - The Turkish football club Göztepe is founded.
- June 29 – The 6.8 M_{w} Santa Barbara earthquake affects the central coast of California with a maximum Mercalli intensity of IX (Violent), destroying much of downtown Santa Barbara, California and leaving 13 people dead.

=== July ===
- July 10–21 – Scopes trial: in a staged test case (the "Monkey Trial") in Dayton, Tennessee, United States, John T. Scopes, a young high school science teacher (technically arrested on May 5 and indicted on May 25) is accused of assigning a reading from a (state-mandated) textbook on Darwinian evolution in violation of a Tennessee state law, the "Butler Act". He is found guilty and fined $100, though the verdict is later overturned on a technicality. The trial makes explicit the fundamentalist–modernist controversy within the Presbyterian Church in the United States of America, with William Jennings Bryan (who dies on July 26) being challenged by the liberal Clarence Darrow.
- July 10 – Meher Baba begins his 44-year silence.
- July 18 – Adolf Hitler publishes Volume 1 of his personal manifesto Mein Kampf in Germany.
- July 21 – English racing motorist Malcolm Campbell becomes the first man to exceed 150 mph (241 km/h) on land when at Pendine Sands in Wales he drives a Sunbeam 350HP automobile at a two-way average speed of 150.33 mph (242 km/h).
- July 25
  - The Telegraph Agency of the Soviet Union (TASS) is established.
  - The Temporary Slavery Commission of the League of Nations files its report on their global investigation of slavery and the slave trade, preparing the ground for the introduction of the 1926 Slavery Convention.
- July 29 – Werner Heisenberg, Max Born and Pascual Jordan published their Umdeutung paper, reporting a breakthrough in quantum physics, in Zeitschrift für Physik in Germany.

=== August ===
- August 1 – The New Cape Central Railway between Worcester and Voorbaai is incorporated into the South African Railways.
- August 8 – The Ku Klux Klan, the largest fraternal racist organization in the United States, demonstrates its popularity by holding a parade with an estimated 30,000-35,000 marchers in Washington, D.C.
- August 14 – The original Hetch Hetchy Moccasin Powerhouse in California is completed and goes on line.
- August 25 – The French complete their evacuation of the Ruhr region of Germany.
- August 31 – Anthropologist Margaret Mead lands in American Samoa to begin nine months of field work that will culminate in her 1928 book Coming of Age in Samoa. The bestselling book will become the first popular anthropological study and will change many attitudes towards tribal peoples.

=== September ===
- September 3 – The U.S. Navy dirigible Shenandoah breaks up in a squall line near Caldwell, Ohio, killing 14 crewmen.
- September 27 – Feast of the Cross according to the Old Calendar: a celestial cross appears over Athens, Greece, while the Greek police pursues a group of Greek Old Calendarists. The phenomenon lasts for half an hour.

=== October ===
- October – The major money forgery and fraud of Alves dos Reis is exposed in Portugal.
- October 1 – The United States Congress grants permission for Gutzon Borglum to begin constructing Mount Rushmore National Memorial on federal land in South Dakota.
- October 2 – In London, UK, John Logie Baird successfully transmits the first television pictures with a greyscale image.
- October 4 – S2, a Finnish Sokol class torpedo boat, is sunk during a fierce storm near the coast of Pori in the Gulf of Bothnia, taking with her the whole crew of 53.
- October 5–16 – The Locarno Treaties are negotiated.
- October 19–29 – Incident at Petrich: A brief conflict occurs between Bulgaria and Greece after a Greek soldier accidentally crosses into the Bulgarian side and is shot by border guards.

=== November ===
- November 9 – Formal foundation date of the Schutzstaffel (SS) as a personal bodyguard for Adolf Hitler in Germany.
- November 14
  - 1925 Australian federal election: Stanley Bruce's Nationalist/Country Coalition Government is re-elected with an increased majority, defeating the Labor Party led by Matthew Charlton.
  - The first Surrealist art exhibition opens in Paris.
- November 17 – The New Zealand and South Seas International Exhibition, a world's fair, opens in Dunedin, New Zealand.
- November 24 – The silent film El Húsar de la Muerte is released in Santiago, Chile.
- November 26 – Prajadhipok (Rama VII) is crowned as King of Siam.
- November 28 – The weekly country music-variety radio programme Grand Ole Opry is first broadcast on WSM radio in Nashville, Tennessee, as the "WSM Barn Dance".

=== December ===
- December 1 – The Locarno Treaties are signed in London, intended to secure the post-war continental European territorial settlement.
- December 11 – Pope Pius XI's encyclical Quas primas, on the Feast of Christ the King, is promulgated.
- December 12 – The first motel in the world, the Milestone Mo-Tel (later the Motel Inn of San Luis Obispo), opens in San Luis Obispo, California.
- December 14 – Wozzeck, Alban Berg's first opera, is premiered at the Berlin State Opera conducted by Erich Kleiber.
- December 15 – Reza Shah takes the oath to become the first shah of Persia of the Pahlavi dynasty.
- December 25 – IG Farben is formed by the merger of six chemical companies in Germany.

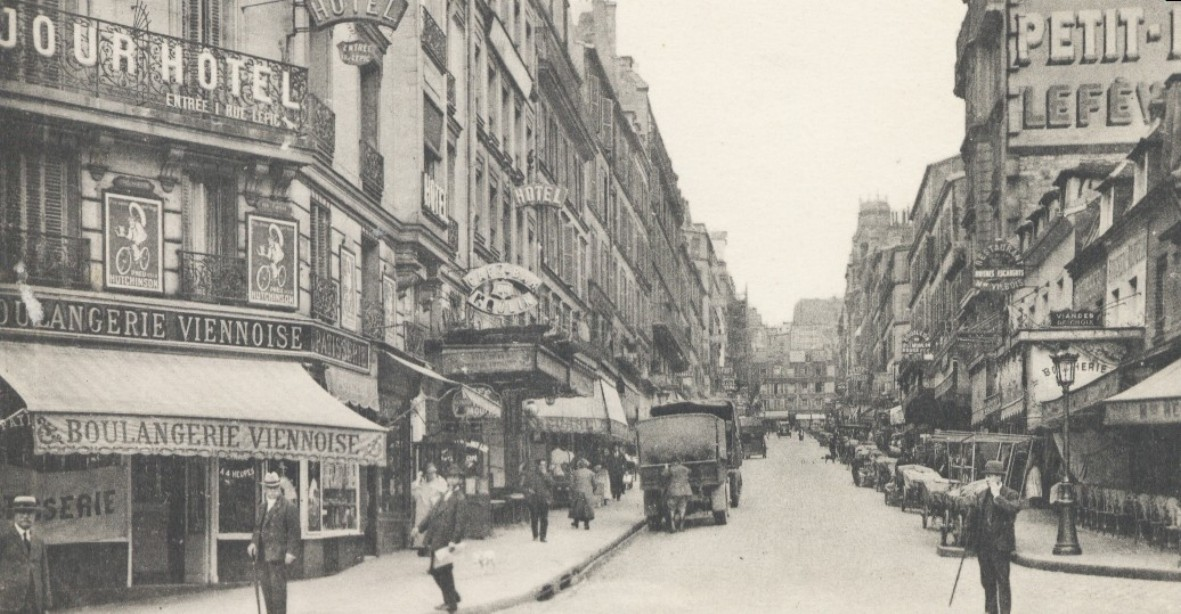
Paris Rue de Montmartre in 1925

=== Date unknown ===
- New York City becomes the largest city in the world, taking the lead from London.
- Islamic Bektashi Order lodges in Turkey are closed down by order of the country's President, Atatürk, and the leadership moves to Albania.
- Lion Feuchtwanger's novel Jud Süß (translated as Jew Süss or Power) is published in Germany.
- Ernest Blythe, Minister for Finance in the Irish Free State, arranges an annual government subsidy of £850 for the Abbey Theatre in Dublin, making it the first state-supported theatre in the English-speaking world.

== Births ==
=== January ===
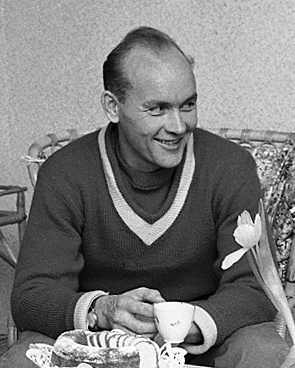
Veikko Hakulinen

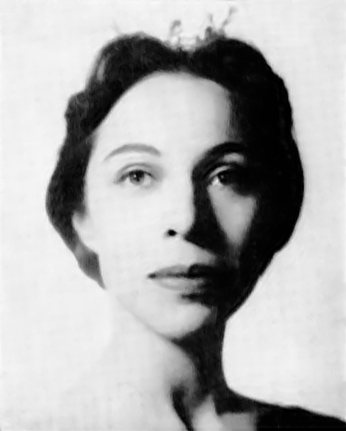
Maria Tallchief

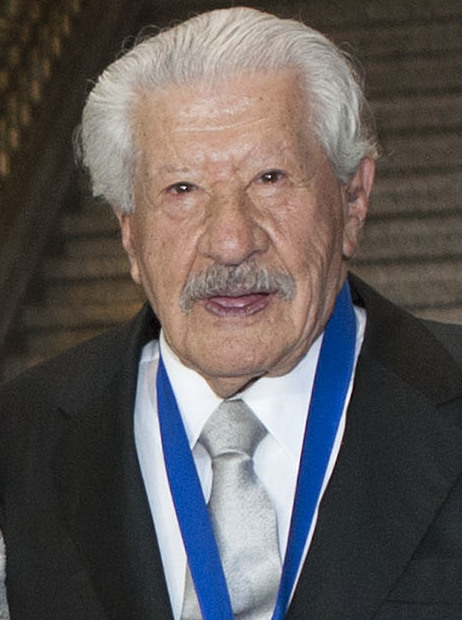
Ignacio López Tarso

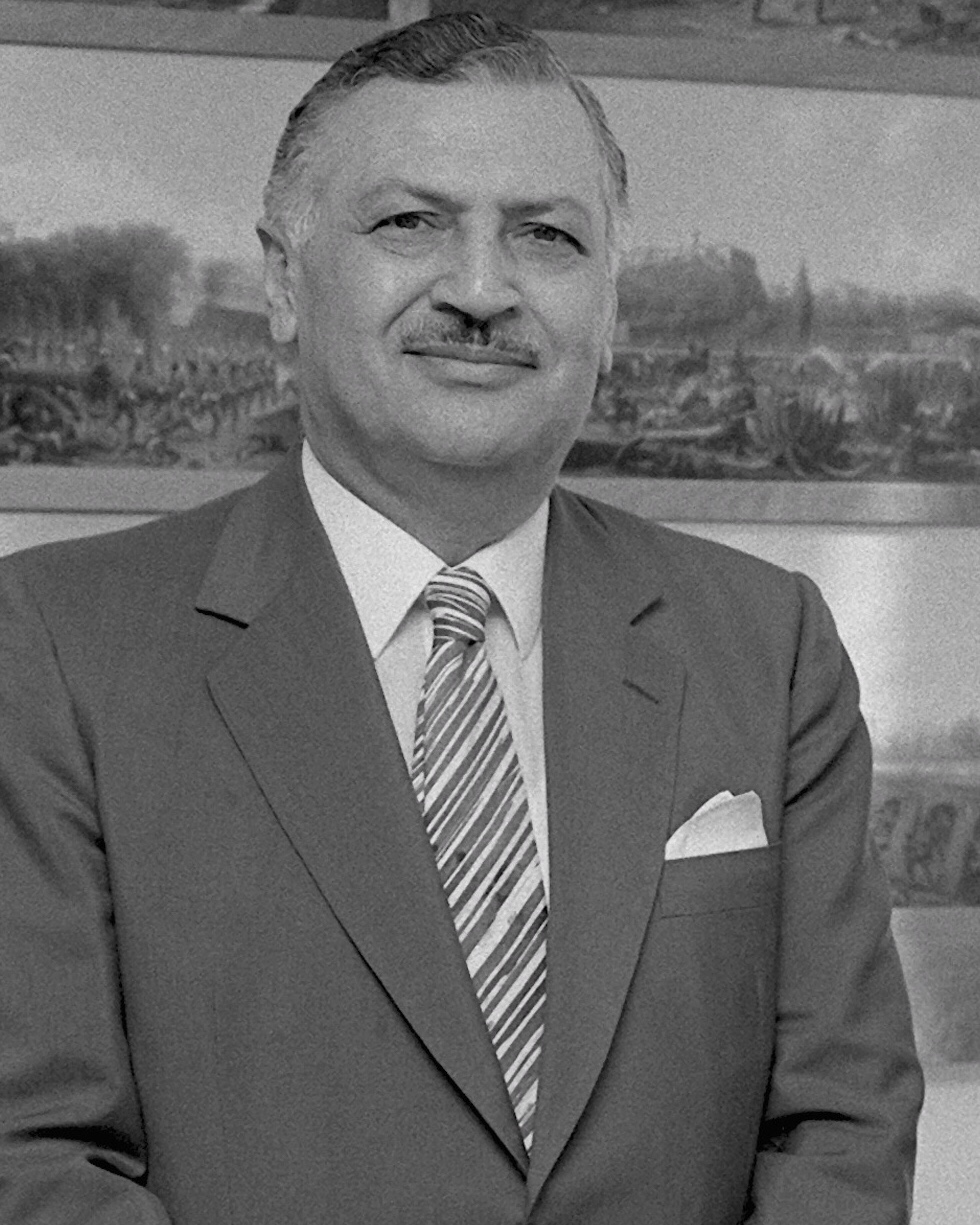
Shafik Wazzan

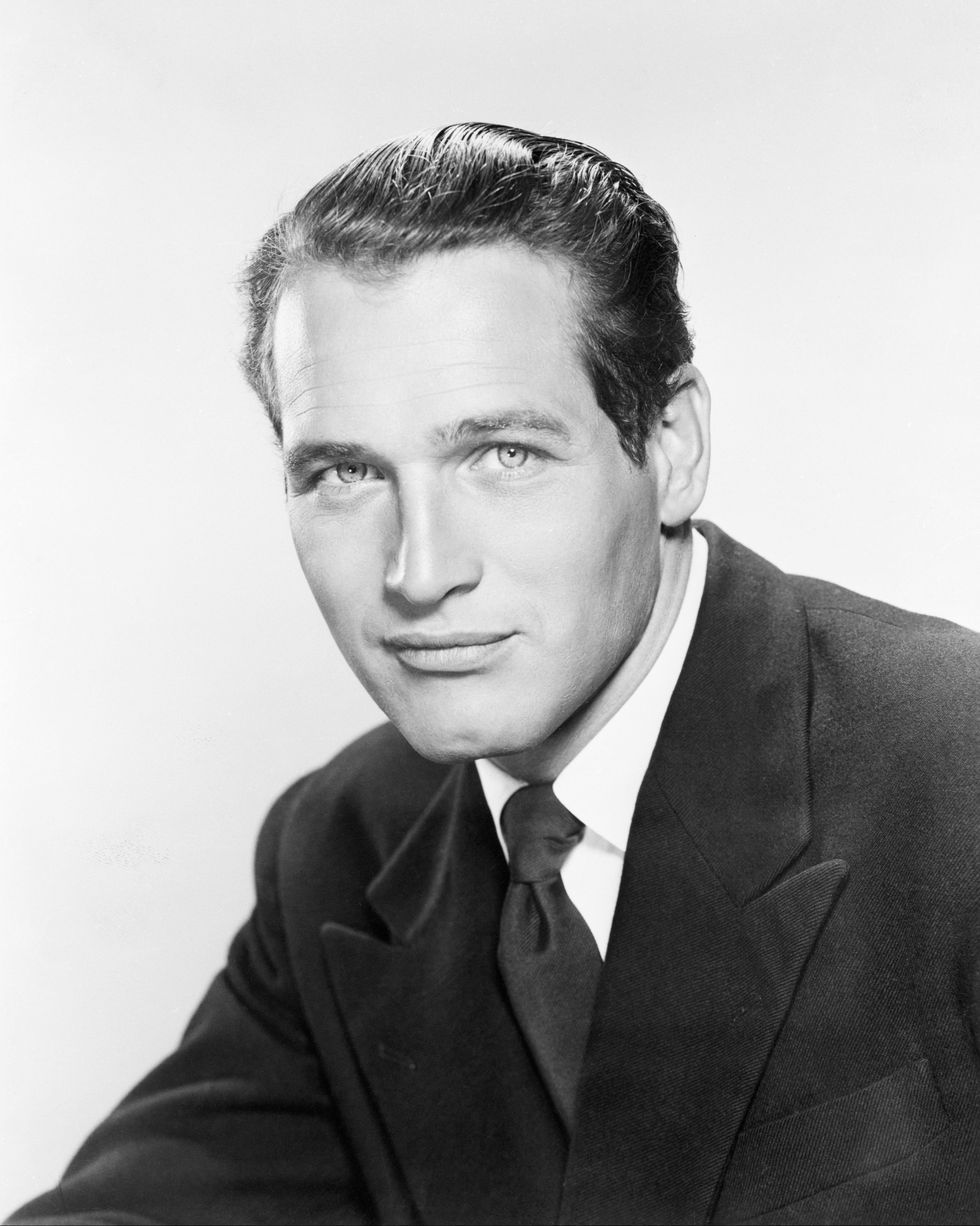
Paul Newman

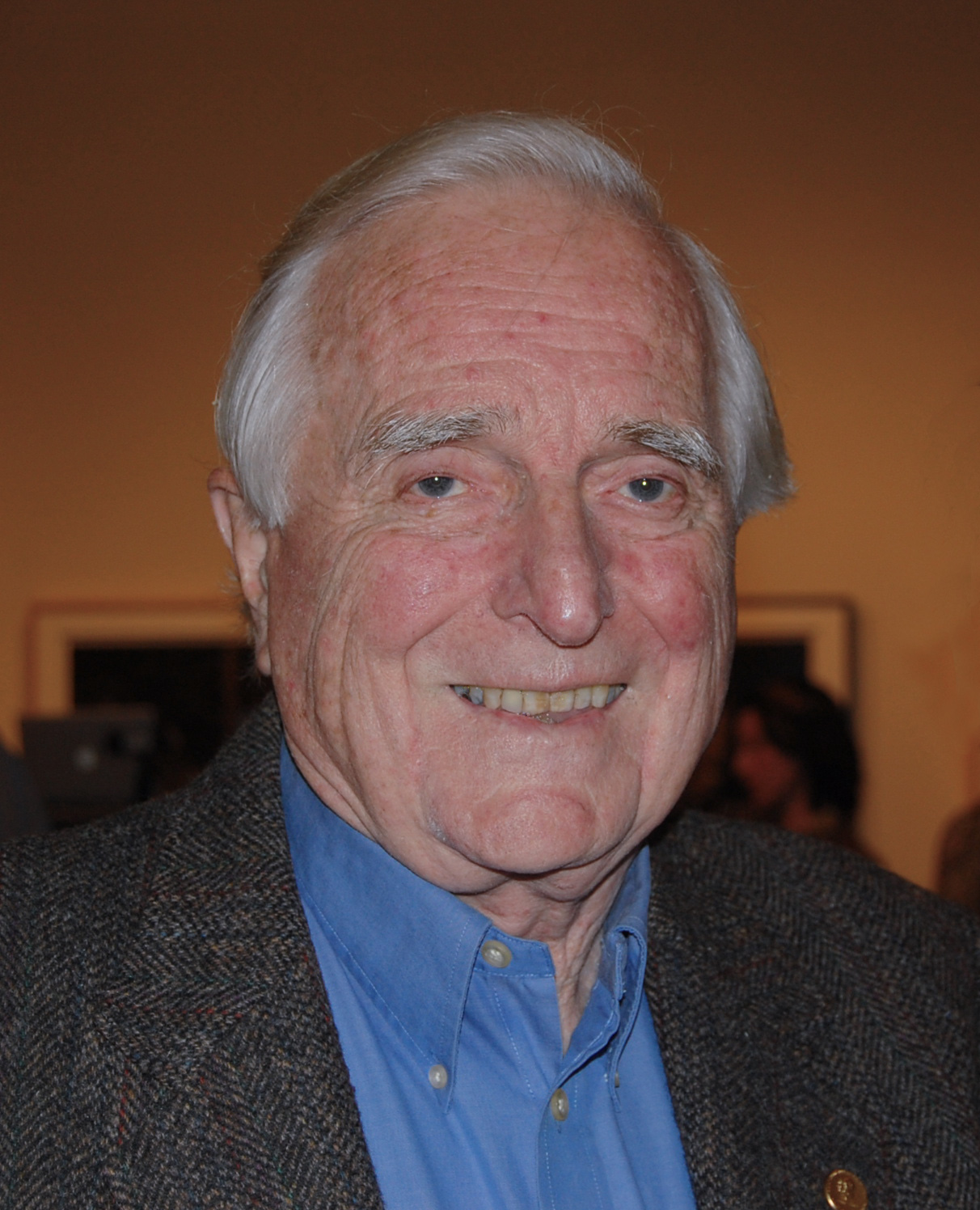
Douglas Engelbart

- January 1 – Paul Bomani, Tanzanian politician and ambassador (d. 2005)
- January 4 – Veikko Hakulinen, Finnish cross-country skier (d. 2003)
- January 6 – John DeLorean, American car maker (d. 2005)
- January 7
  - Gerald Durrell, British naturalist, zookeeper, author and television presenter (d. 1995)
  - Harry Stradling Jr., American cinematographer (d. 2017)
- January 8 – Bernardo Ruiz, Spanish road cycling racer (d. 2025)
- January 9 – Lee Van Cleef, American actor (d. 1989)
- January 10 – Peter Colotka, Slovak academic, lawyer and politician, Prime Minister 1969–1988 (d. 2019)
- January 12 – Katherine MacGregor, American actress (d. 2018)
- January 13
  - Rosemary Murphy, American actress (d. 2014)
  - Gwen Verdon, American actress and dancer (d. 2000)
- January 14 – Yukio Mishima, Japanese writer (d. 1970)
- January 15
  - August Englas, Estonian wrestler (d. 2017)
  - Ruth Slenczynska, American pianist (d. 2026)
  - Ignacio López Tarso, Mexican actor (d. 2023)
- January 16 – Shafik Wazzan, 27th Prime Minister of Lebanon (d. 1999)
- January 17
  - Robert Cormier, American young adult author (d. 2000)
  - Duane Hanson, American sculptor (d. 1996)
- January 20 – Ernesto Cardenal, Nicaraguan priest, poet and politician (d. 2020)
- January 24 – Maria Tallchief, American ballerina (d. 2013)
- January 25 – Barbara Carroll, American jazz pianist (d. 2017)
- January 26
  - Joan Leslie, American actress (d. 2015)
  - Paul Newman, American actor, film director, entrepreneur and philanthropist (d. 2008)
- January 27 – Sufi Abu Taleb, President of Egypt (d. 2008)
- January 29 – Robert W. McCollum, American epidemiologist (d. 2010)
- January 30 – Douglas Engelbart, American inventor (d. 2013)
- January 31
  - Bernardino Rivera Álvarez, Bolivian bishop (d. 2010)
  - Micheline Lannoy, Belgian figure skater (d. 2023)

=== February ===
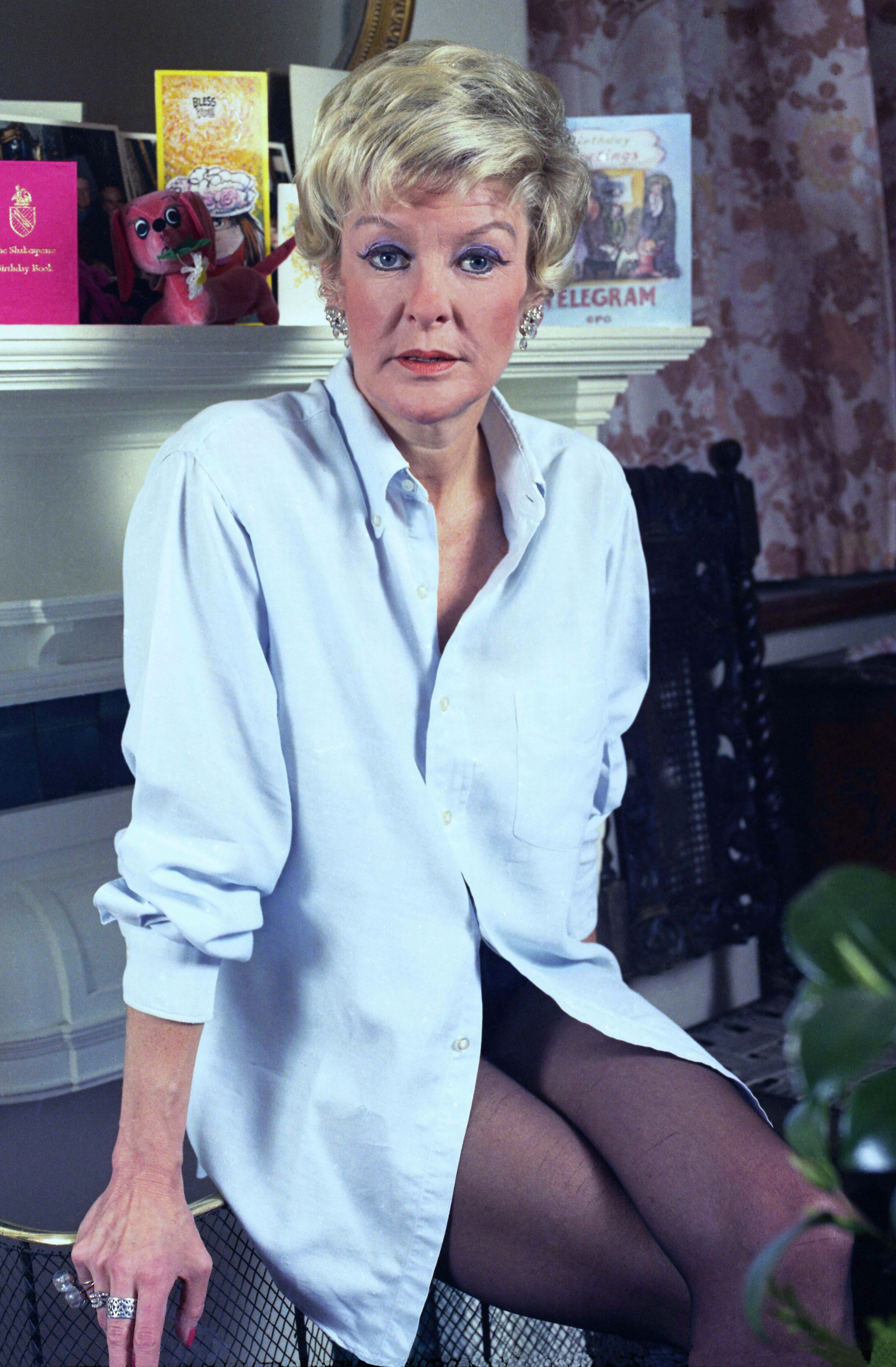
Elaine Stritch

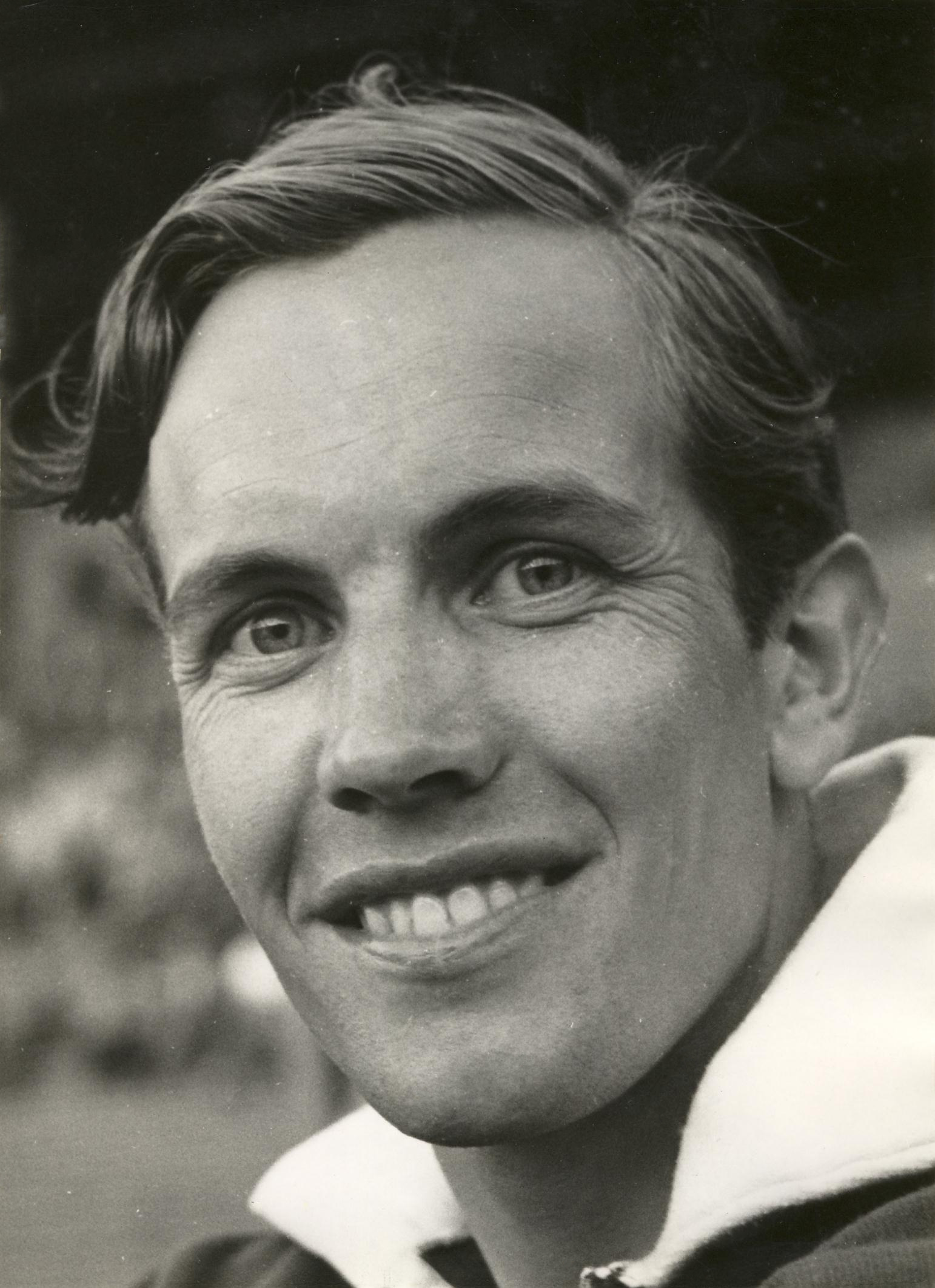
Arne Åhman

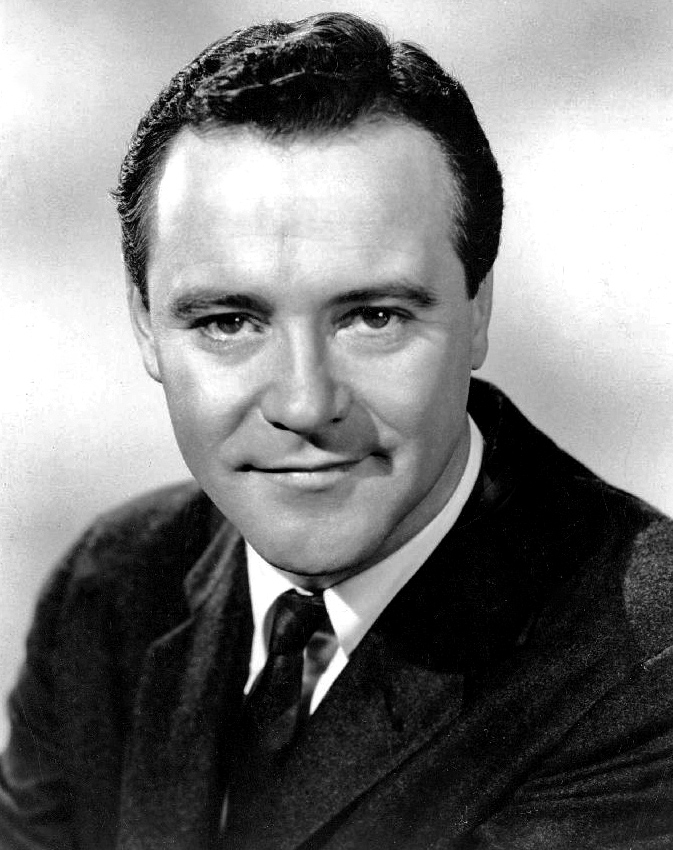
Jack Lemmon

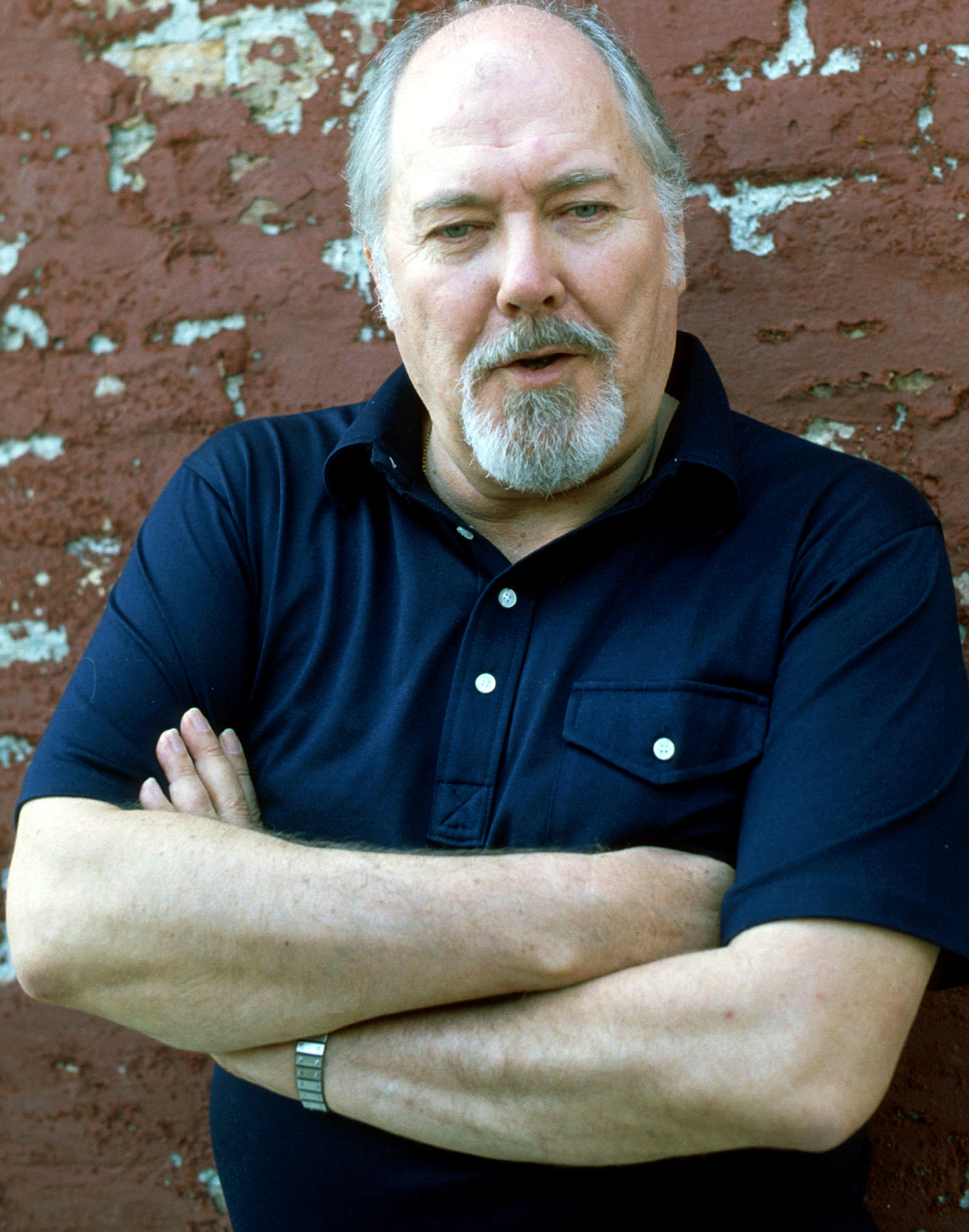
Robert Altman

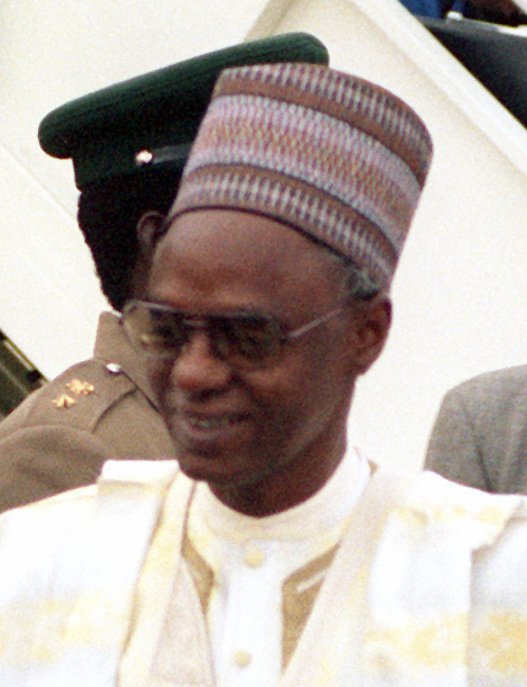
Shehu Shagari

- February 2 – Elaine Stritch, American actress (d. 2014)
- February 3
  - Shelley Berman, American comedian and actor (d. 2017)
  - John Fiedler, American actor (d. 2005)
  - Leon Schlumpf, Swiss Federal Councillor (d. 2012)
- February 4
  - Arne Åhman, Swedish athlete (d. 2022)
  - Jutta Hipp, German born American jazz pianist and composer (d. 2003)
- February 8 – Jack Lemmon, American actor and film director (d. 2001)
- February 10
  - Dhalia, Indonesian actress (d. 1991)
  - Pierre Mondy, French film and theatre actor and director (d. 2012)
  - Daisy Myers, African-American educator (d. 2011)
- February 11
  - Virginia E. Johnson, American sexologist (d. 2013)
  - Amparo Rivelles, Spanish actress (d. 2013)
  - Kim Stanley, American actress (d. 2001)
- February 16 – Romolo Bizzotto, Italian professional football player and coach (d. 2017)
- February 17
  - Ron Goodwin, English composer and conductor (d. 2003)
  - Hal Holbrook, American actor (d. 2021)
- February 18
  - Abdelsalam al-Majali, 60th and 63rd Prime Minister of Jordan (d. 2023)
  - Ghafar Baba, Malaysian politician (d. 2006)
  - George Kennedy, American actor (d. 2016)
  - Krishna Sobti, Indian Hindi-language fiction writer and essayist (d. 2019)
- February 20 – Robert Altman, American film director (d. 2006)
- February 21
  - Sam Peckinpah, American film director (d. 1984)
  - Štefan Vrablec, Slovak Roman Catholic prelate (d. 2017)
- February 22 – Edward Gorey, American writer, illustrator and playwright (d. 2000)
- February 23 – Eric Prabhakar, Indian sprinter (d. 2011)
  - Maddy English, American female baseball player (d. 2004)
- February 25
  - Lisa Kirk, American actress and singer (d. 1990)
  - Eduardo Risso, Uruguayan rower (d. 1986)
  - Shehu Shagari, President of Nigeria (1979–83) (d. 2018)
- February 26 – Everton Weekes, West Indian cricketer (d. 2020)
- February 28
  - Louis Nirenberg, Canadian-American mathematician (d. 2020)
  - Harry H. Corbett, English actor (d. 1982)

=== March ===
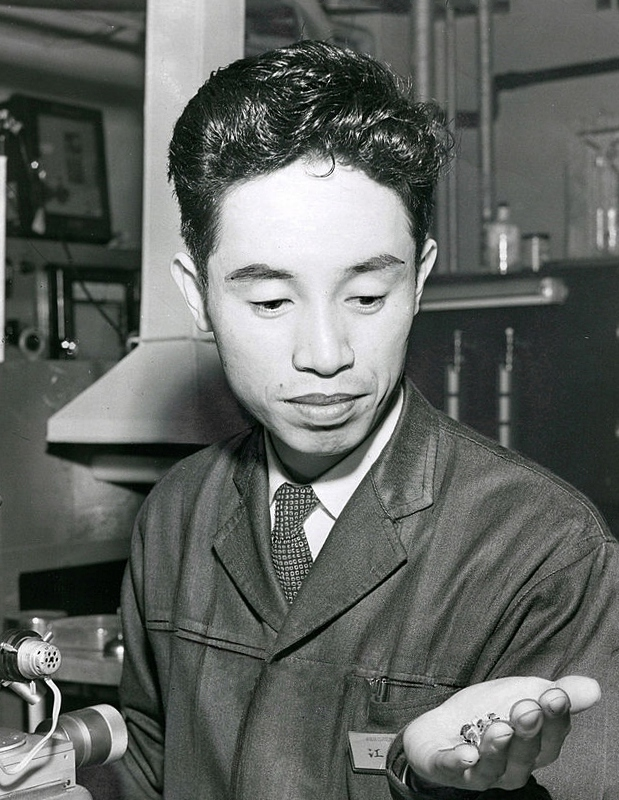
Leo Esaki

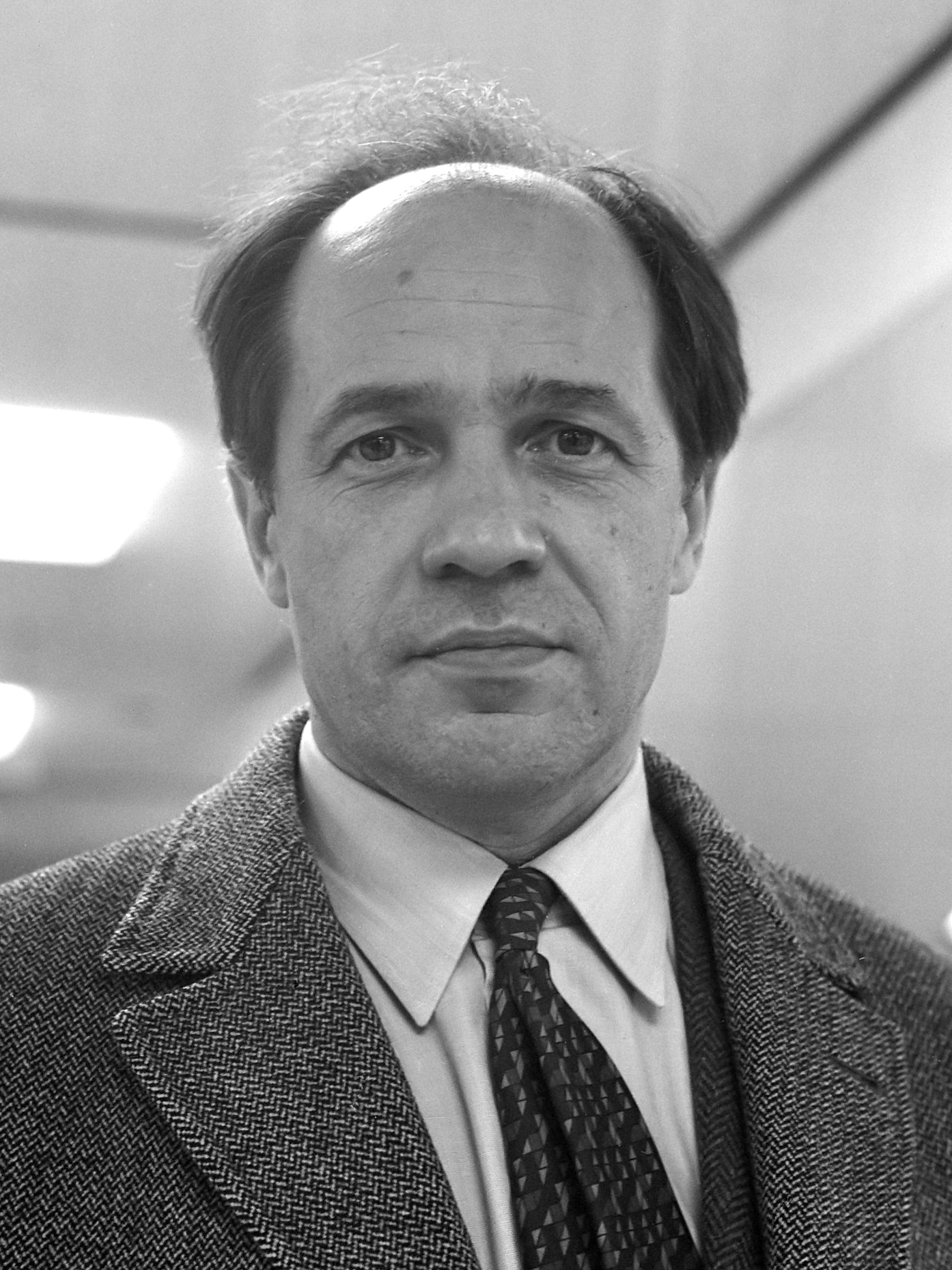
Pierre Boulez

- March 1
  - Keith Harvey Miller, American politician (d. 2019)
  - Alexandre do Nascimento, Angolan prelate (d. 2024)
- March 4
  - Inezita Barroso, Brazilian singer, guitarist, actress, TV presenter (d. 2015)
  - Alan R. Battersby, English organic chemist (d. 2018)
  - Paul Mauriat, French musician ("L'amour est bleu") (d. 2006)
  - Christa Meves, German psychotherapist and writer
- March 7 – Josef Ertl, German politician (d. 2000)
- March 8
  - John Harland Bryant, American physician (d. 2017)
  - Dennis Lotis, South African-English singer and actor (d. 2023)
- March 11 – Duncan Ndegwa, Head of Civil Service and Secretary to the Cabinet in Kenya
- March 12
  - Leo Esaki, Japanese physicist, Nobel Prize in Physics laureate
  - G. William Whitehurst, American journalist and politician (d. 2026)
- March 13
  - Roy Haynes, American jazz drummer (d. 2024)
  - John Tate, American mathematician (d. 2019)
- March 14 – Francis A. Marzen, Roman Catholic priest (d. 2004)
- March 15 – Art Murakowski, American football player (d. 1985)
- March 16
  - Mary Hinkson, African-American dancer and choreographer (d. 2014)
  - Luis E. Miramontes, Mexican chemist (d. 2004)
- March 17 – Gabriele Ferzetti, Italian actor (d. 2015)
- March 18 – Alessandro Alessandroni, Italian musician and composer (d. 2017)
- March 19 – Brent Scowcroft, American general and diplomat (d. 2020)
- March 21 – Peter Brook, English theatre director (d. 2022)
- March 22 – Gerard Hoffnung, German-born English humorist (d. 1959)
- March 23
  - Robie Lester, American Grammy-nominated voice artist and singer (d. 2005)
  - David Watkin, British cinematographer (d. 2008)
- March 25
  - Flannery O'Connor, American writer (d. 1964)
  - Kishori Sinha, Indian politician (d. 2016)
- March 26 – Pierre Boulez, French composer (d. 2016)
- March 27 – Henry Plumb, Baron Plumb, English farmer and politician (d. 2022)
- March 28 – Raja Perempuan Budriah, Malaysian royal consort (d. 2008)
- March 29 – David Tsimakuridze, Georgian freestyle wrestler (d. 2006)

=== April ===
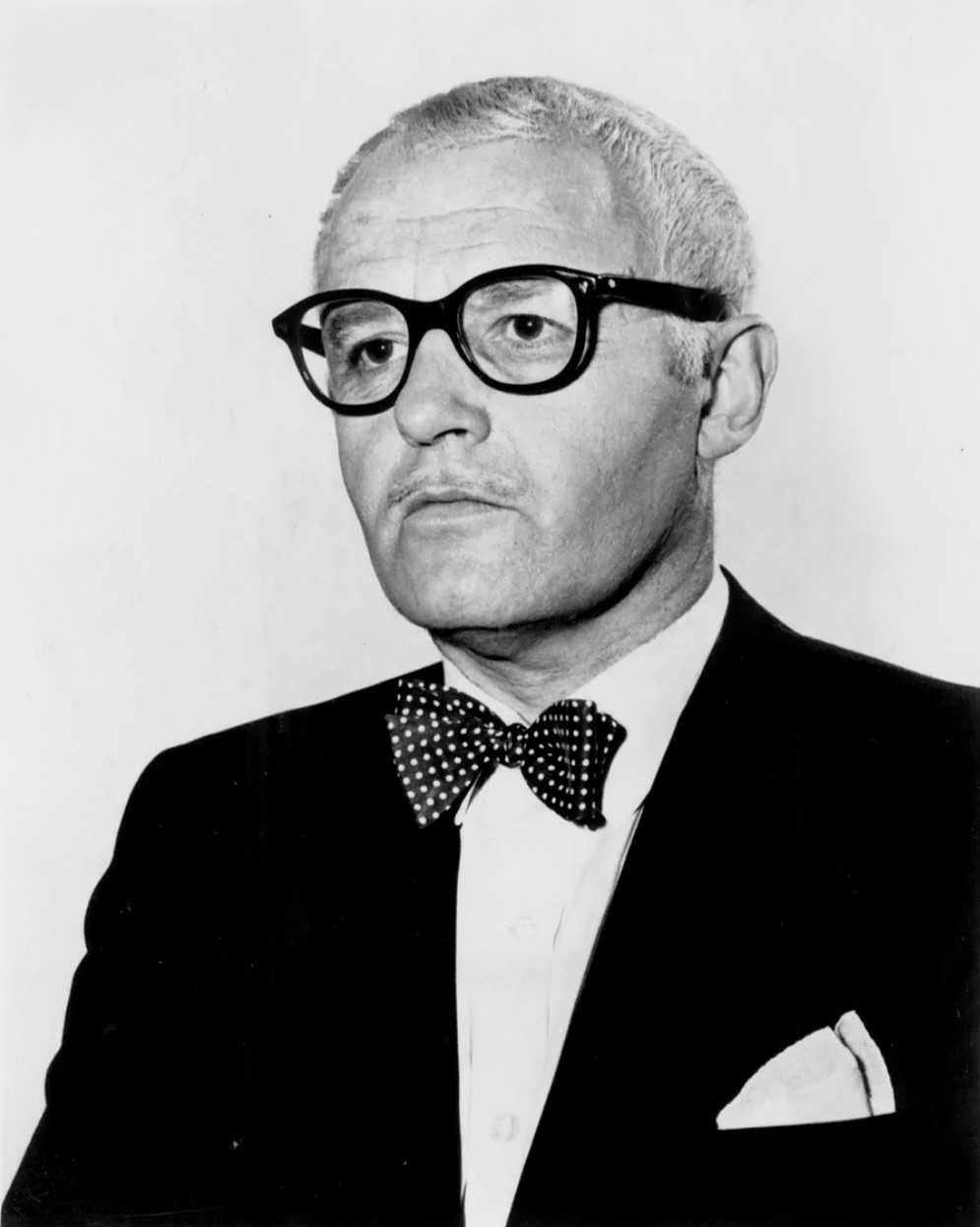
Rod Steiger

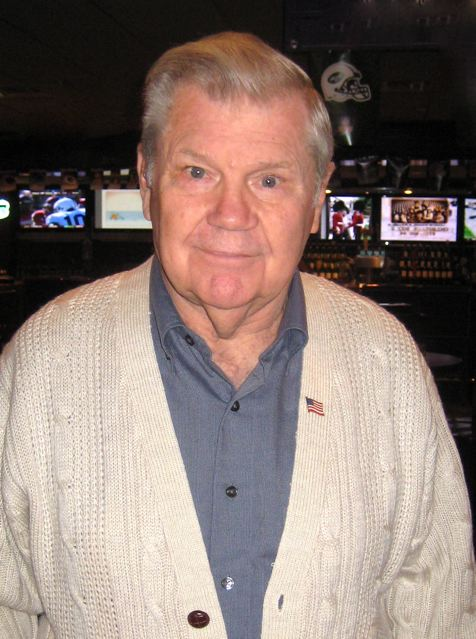
Bob Hastings

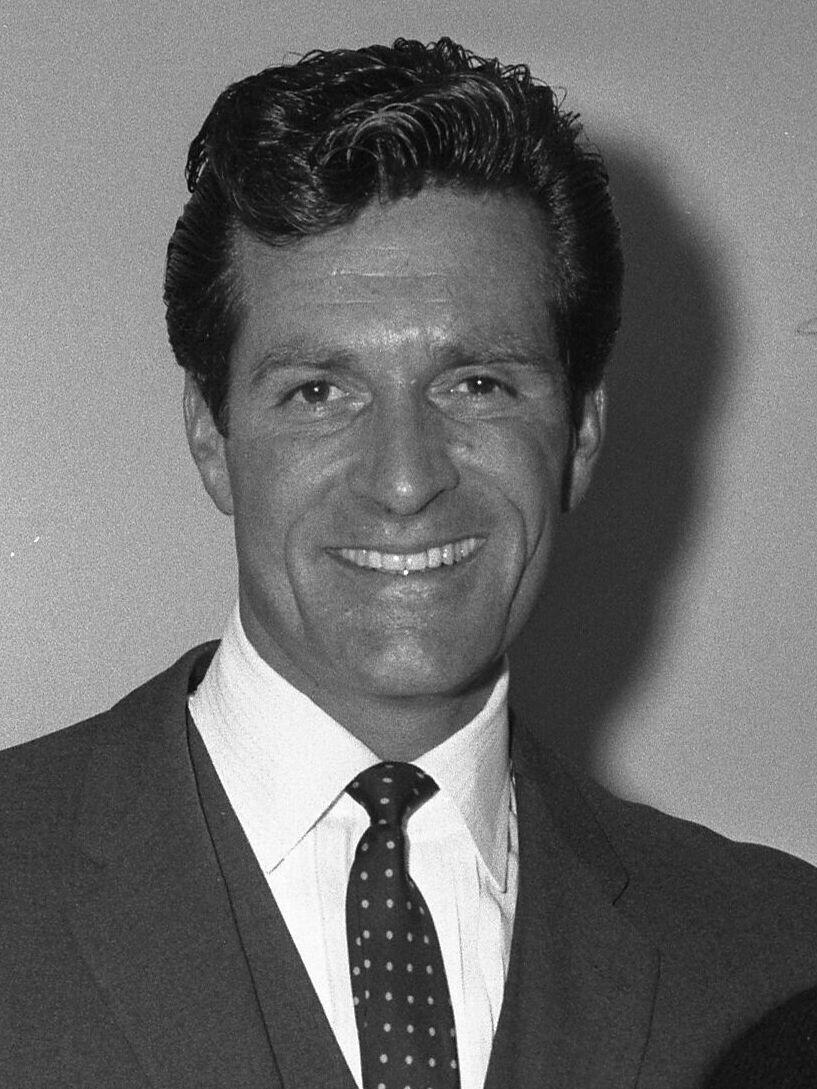
Hugh O'Brian

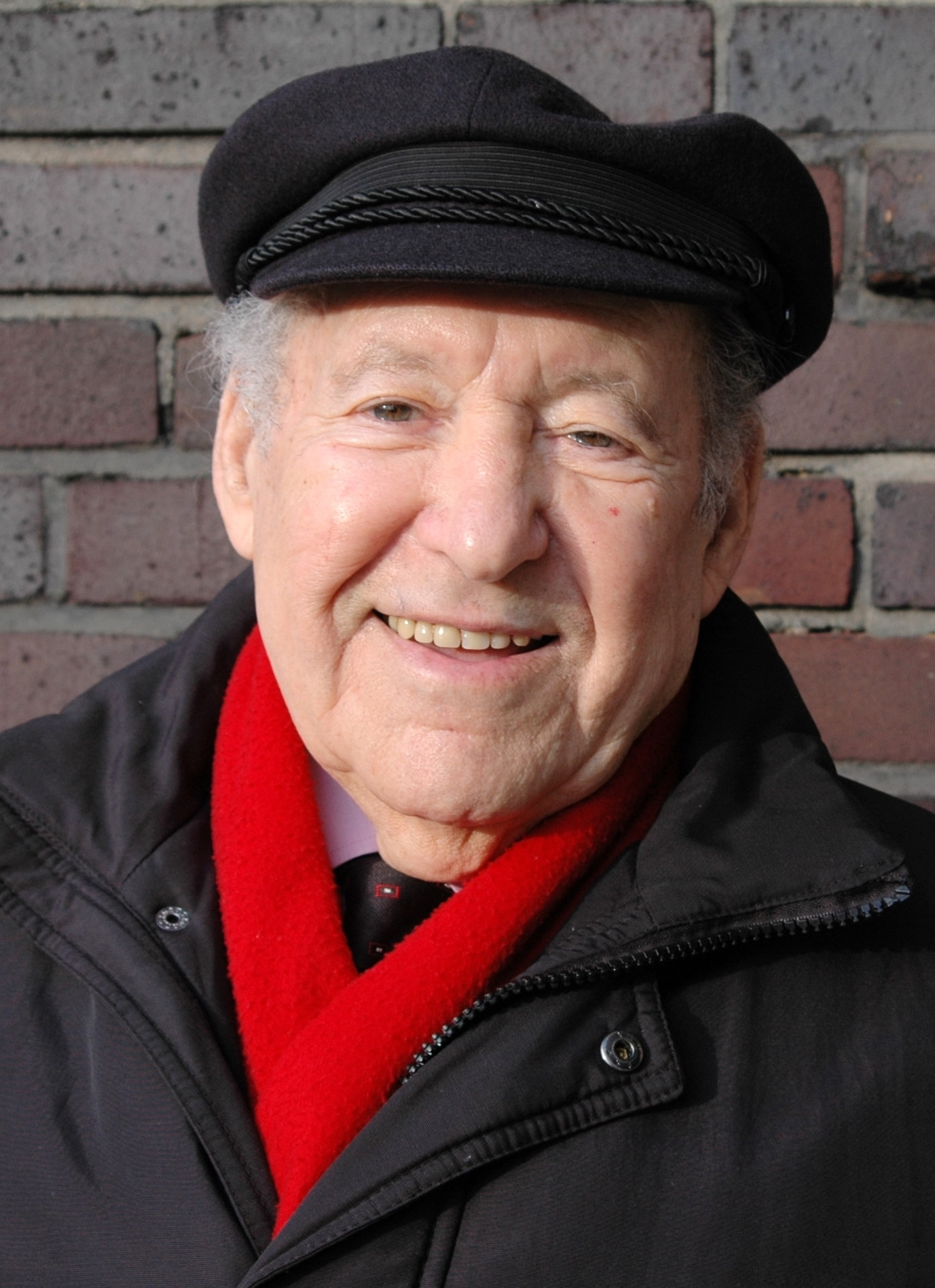
Solomon Perel

- April 1 – Piero Livi, Italian director and screenwriter (d. 2015)
- April 2 – Roger Milner, British actor (d. 2014)
- April 3 – Tony Benn, British politician (d. 2014)
- April 4 – Serge Dassault, French businessman and politician (d. 2018)
- April 7 – Chaturanan Mishra, Indian politician (d. 2011)
- April 13 – Michael Halliday, English-Australian linguist (d. 2018)
- April 14
  - Gene Ammons, American jazz saxophonist (d. 1974)
  - Abel Muzorewa, Zimbabwean politician (d. 2010)
  - Rod Steiger, American actor (d. 2002)
- April 15
  - Milton J. Rosenberg, American psychology professor (d. 2018)
  - Zdeněk Růžička, Czech Olympic gymnast (d. 2021)
- April 17 – René Moawad, 13th president of Lebanon (d. 1989)
- April 18 – Bob Hastings, American actor (d. 2014)
- April 19
  - Hugh O'Brian, American soldier and actor (d. 2016)
  - John Kraaijkamp Sr., Dutch actor and comedian (d. 2011)
- April 20
  - Elena Verdugo, American actress (d. 2017)
  - Bob Will, American rower (d. 2019)
- April 21
  - Anthony Mason, Australian judge (d. 2026)
  - Solomon Perel, Israeli motivational speaker (d. 2023)
- April 22 – George Cole, English actor (d. 2015)
- April 24 – Eugen Weber, Romanian-born historian (d. 2007)
- April 25
  - Tony Christopher, Baron Christopher, English businessman (d. 2026)
  - Louis O'Neill, Canadian politician (d. 2018)
- April 26
  - Vladimir Boltyansky, Russian mathematician, educator and author (d. 2019)
  - Michele Ferrero, Italian businessman (d. 2015)
  - Jørgen Ingmann, Danish musician (d. 2015)
- April 27 – Brigitte Auber, French actress
- April 29
  - John Compton, Saint Lucian lawyer and politician, 1st prime minister of Saint Lucia (d. 2007)
  - Iwao Takamoto, Japanese-American animator (d. 2007)

=== May ===
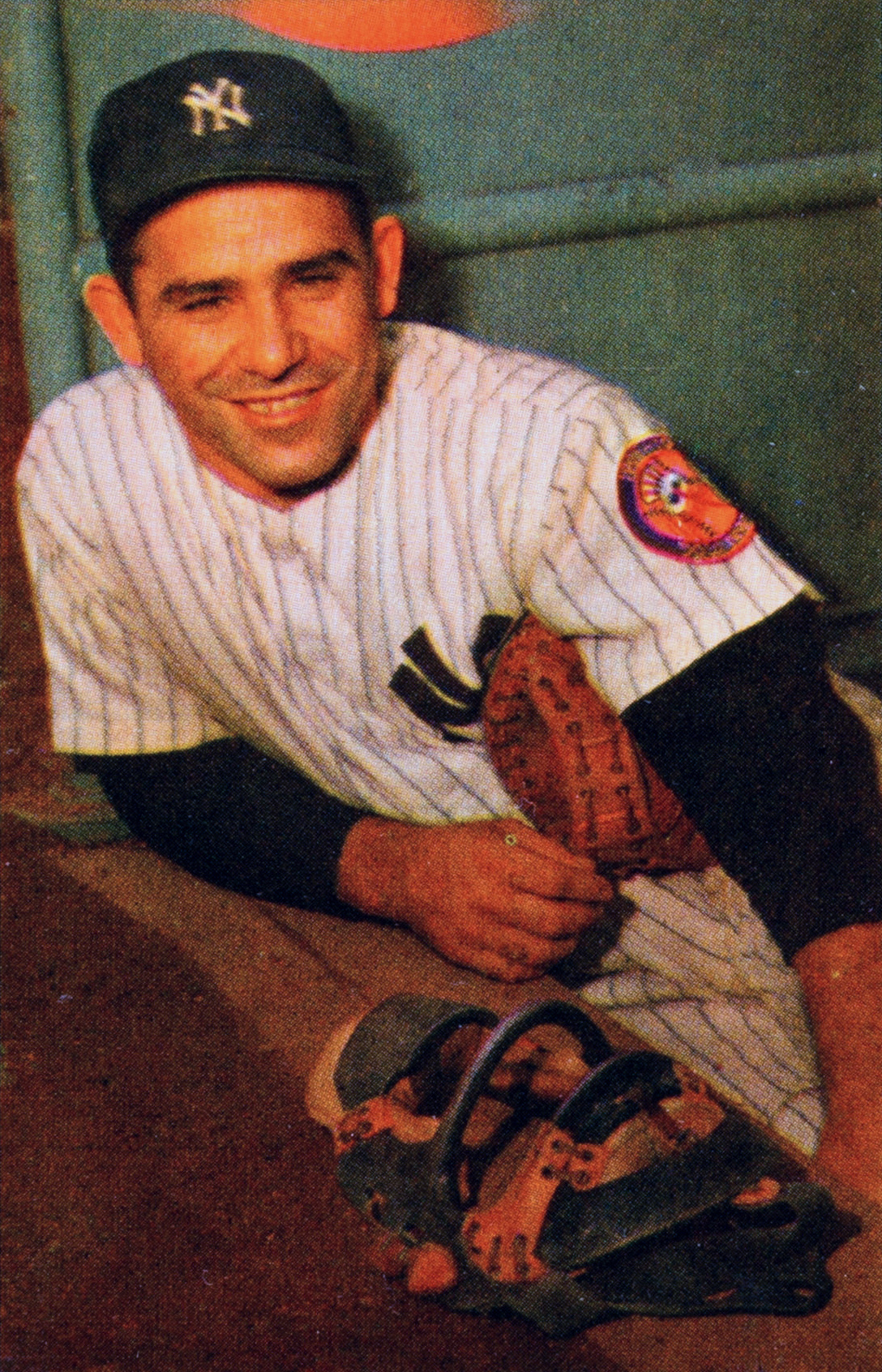
Yogi Berra

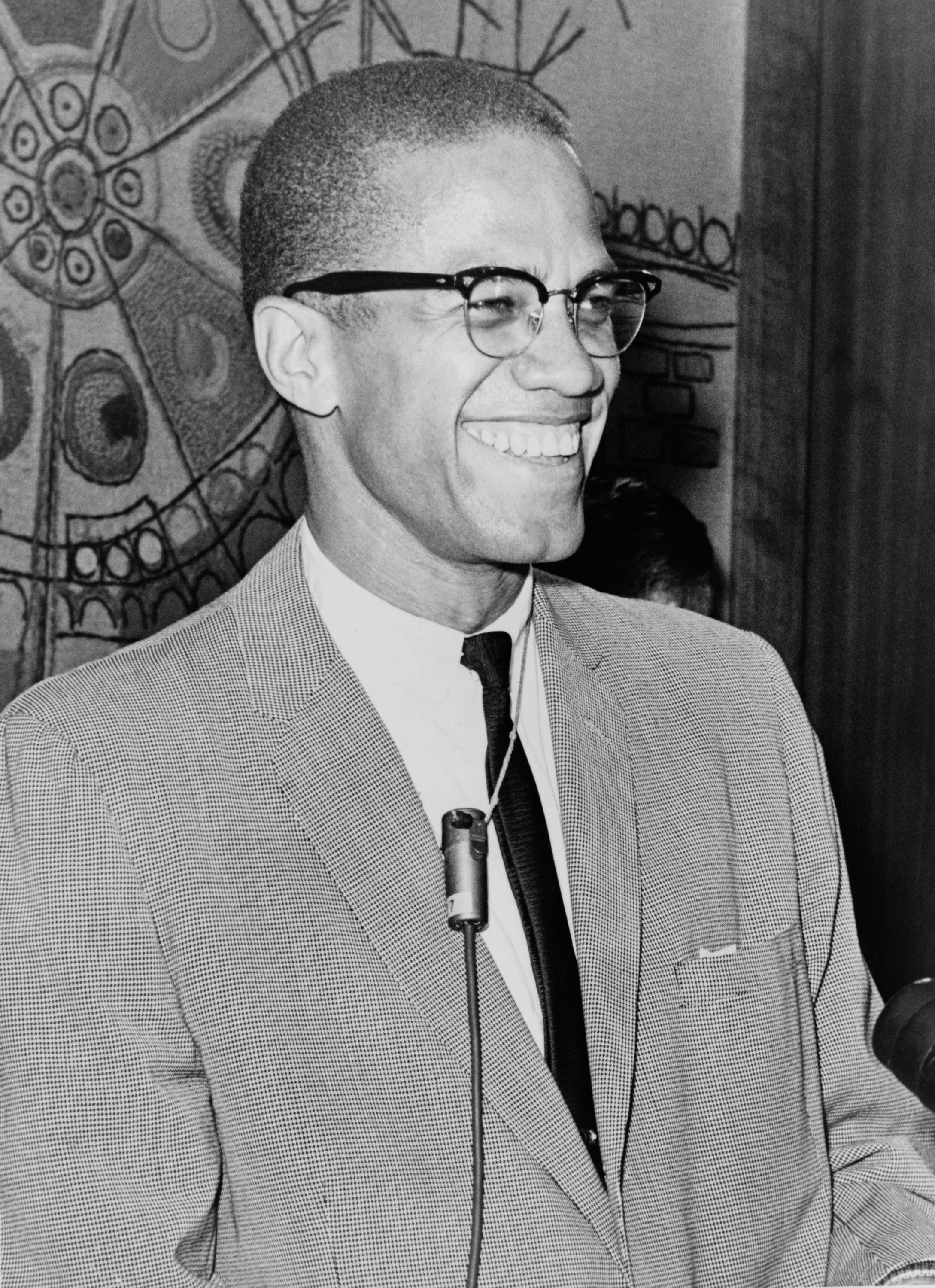
Malcolm X

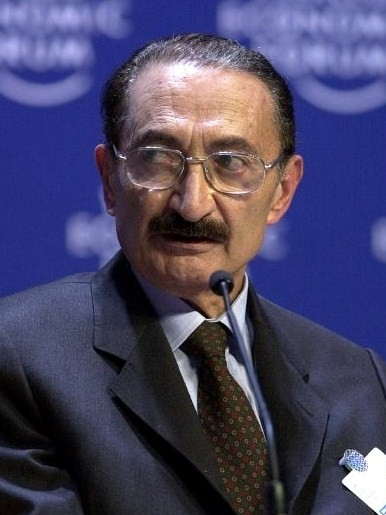
Bülent Ecevit

- May 1
  - Scott Carpenter, American astronaut (d. 2013)
  - Anna May Hutchison, American professional baseball player (d. 1998)
- May 2
  - Maria Barroso, Portuguese politician and actress (d. 2015)
  - Inga Gill, Swedish actress (d. 2000)
  - John Neville, English actor (d. 2011)
- May 3 – Ngiratkel Etpison, 5th president of Palau (d. 1997)
- May 4
  - Syed Ahmad Shahabuddin, Malaysian politician (d. 2008)
  - Jenő Buzánszky, Hungarian footballer (d. 2015)
  - Maurice R. Greenberg, American business executive
- May 8 – Ali Hassan Mwinyi, 2nd President of Tanzania (d. 2024)
- May 9 – Vladimir Tadej, Croatian production designer, screenwriter and film director (d. 2017)
- May 10 – Ilie Verdeț, 51st prime minister of Romania (d. 2001)
- May 12 – Yogi Berra, American baseball player (d. 2015)
- May 14 – Oona O'Neill, American actress (d. 1991)
- May 15 – Andrei Eshpai, Soviet and Russian composer (d. 2015)
- May 16
  - Nancy Roman, American astronomer (d. 2018)
  - Ola Vincent, Nigerian economist and banker (d. 2012)
- May 18 – Gérard Corboud, Swiss entrepreneur, art collector and philanthropist (d. 2017)
- May 19
  - Malcolm X, African-American civil rights activist (d. 1965)
  - Pol Pot, Cambodian Stalinist dictator and leader of the Khmer Rouge (d. 1998)
- May 20 – Gregory Yong, Archbishop of Singapore (d. 2008)
- May 22
  - Julio Garrett Ayllón, 33rd Vice President of Bolivia (d. 2018)
  - James King, American tenor (d. 2005)
  - Jean Tinguely, Swiss painter and sculptor (d. 1991)
- May 23 – Joshua Lederberg, American molecular biologist, recipient of the Nobel Prize in Physiology or Medicine (d. 2008)
- May 24 – Mai Zetterling, Swedish actress and film director (d. 1994)
- May 25
  - Jeanne Crain, American actress (d. 2003)
  - José María Gatica, Argentine boxer (d. 1963)
  - Rudolf Scheurer, Swiss football referee (d. 2015)
- May 26
  - Alec McCowen, English actor (d. 2017)
  - Carmen Montejo, Cuban-born Mexican actress (d. 2013)
- May 28
  - Bülent Ecevit, 3-time prime minister of Turkey (d. 2006)
  - Dietrich Fischer-Dieskau, German lyric baritone and conductor (d. 2012)
  - Lucien Nedzi, American politician and member of the US House of Representatives from 1961 to 1981 (d. 2025)
  - Pavel Štěpán, Czech pianist (d. 1998)
- May 30 – John Marks, English doctor and author (d. 2022)
- May 31
  - Julian Beck, American actor, director, poet and painter (d. 1985)
  - Frei Otto, German architect (d. 2015)
  - Donn A. Starry, American army officer (d. 2011)

=== June ===
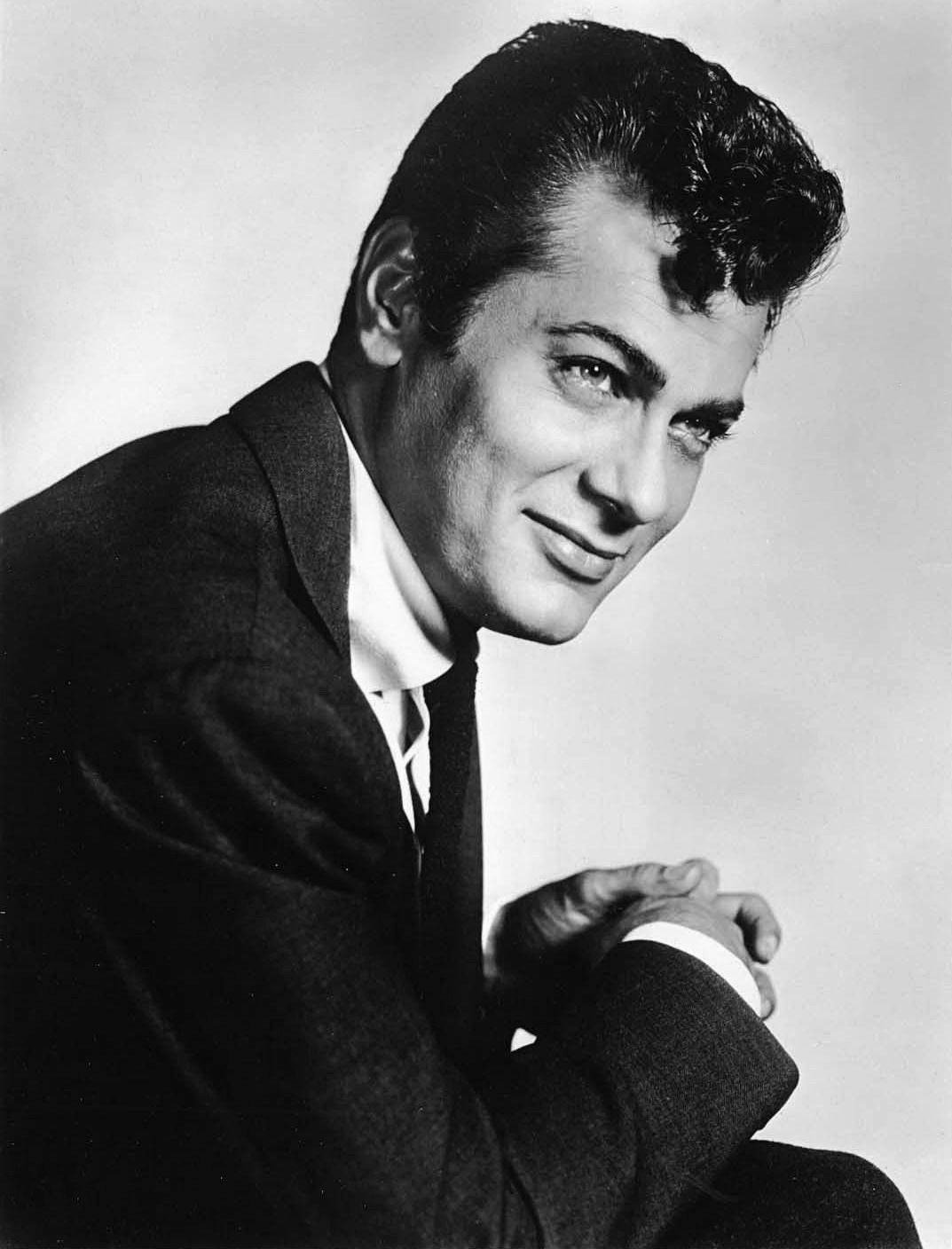
Tony Curtis

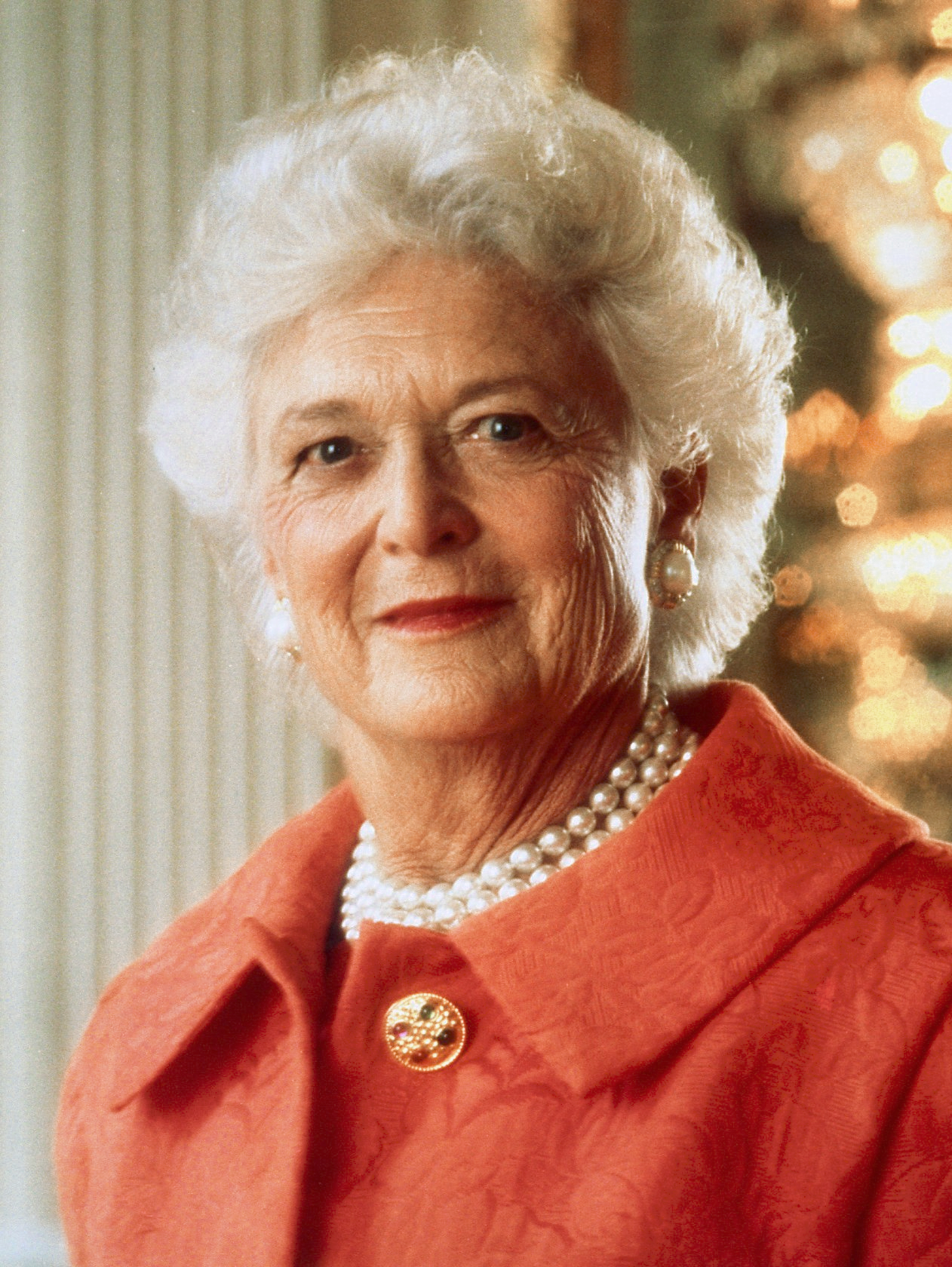
Barbara Bush

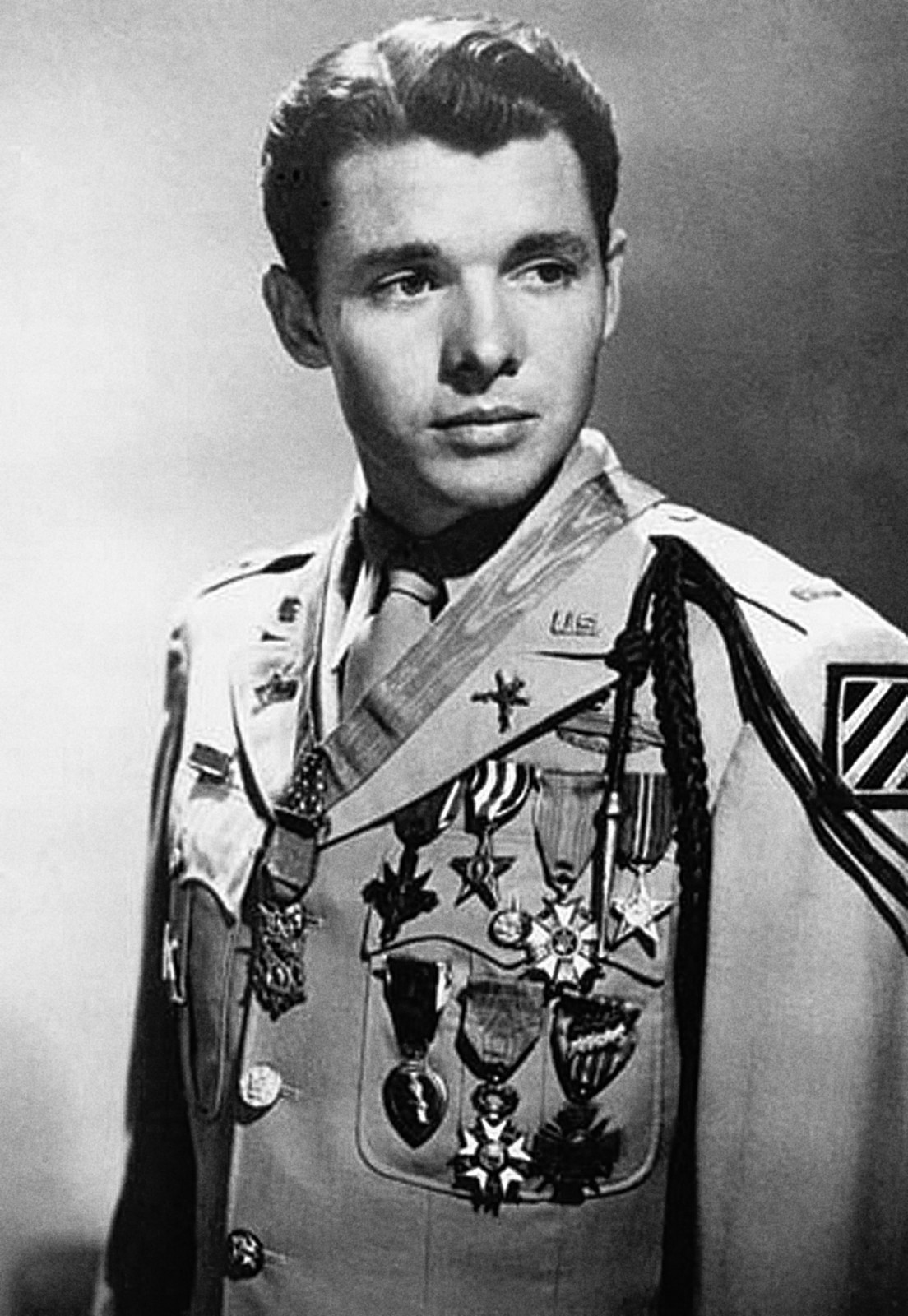
Audie Murphy

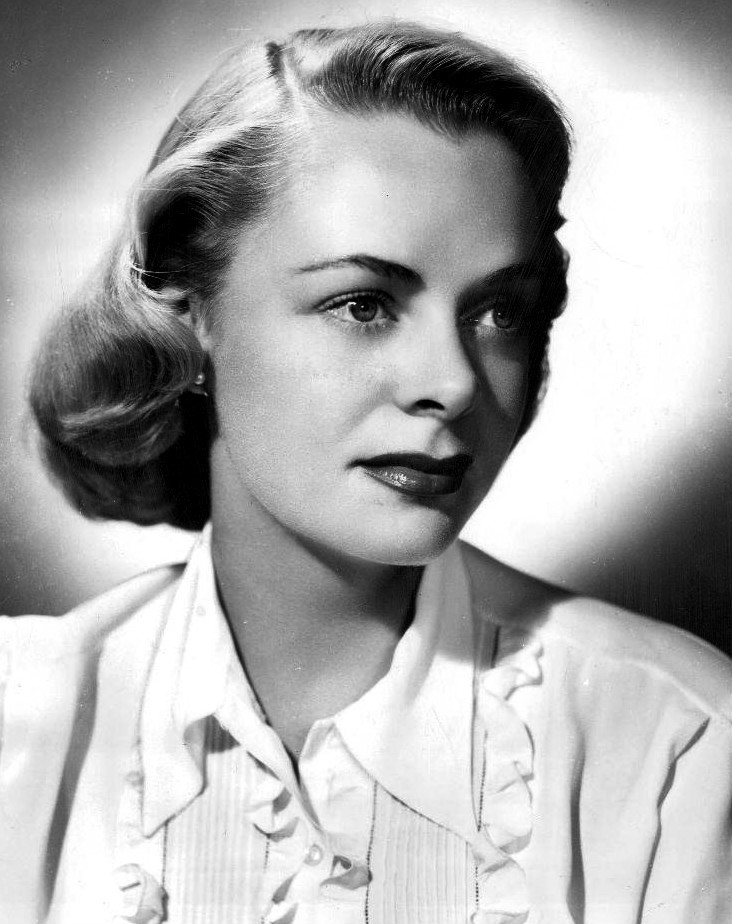
June Lockhart

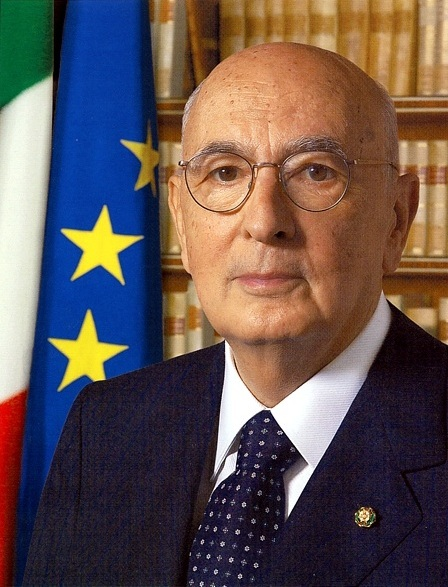
Giorgio Napolitano

- June 2
  - Julius Blank, semiconductor pioneer (d. 2011)
  - Buddy Elias, Swiss actor and president of the Anne Frank Fonds (d. 2015)
- June 3 – Tony Curtis, American actor (d. 2010)
- June 4 – Antonio Puchades, Spanish footballer (d. 2013)
- June 5
  - Bill Hayes, American actor (d. 2024)
  - Maharani Wisma Susana Siregar, Indonesian-Dutch freedom fighter and wife of President Sukarno
- June 6 – Hideji Ōtaki, Japanese actor (d. 2012)
- June 7 – Ernestina Herrera de Noble, Argentine publisher and executive (d. 2017)
- June 8 – Barbara Bush, First Lady of the United States (d. 2018)
- June 10
  - Fortunato Abat, Filipino army general and politician (d. 2018)
  - Nat Hentoff, American historian, novelist, jazz and country music critic and syndicated columnist (d. 2017)
- June 11 – William Styron, American writer (d. 2006)
- June 12 – Raphaël Géminiani, French road cycling racer (d. 2024)
- June 13 – Dušan Trbojević, Serbian pianist, composer, musical writer and university professor (d. 2011)
- June 14
  - Hideyuki Fujisawa, Japanese professional Go player (d. 2009)
  - Pierre Salinger, White House Press Secretary (d. 2004)
- June 15
  - Richard Baker, English broadcast journalist and author (d. 2018)
  - Vasily Golubev, Soviet, Russian painter (d. 1985)
  - Attilâ İlhan, Turkish poet, novelist, essayist, journalist and reviewer (d. 2005)
- June 16 – Jean d'Ormesson, French novelist (d. 2017)
- June 17 – Mervyn Finlay, Australian member of the Supreme Court of New South Wales and Queen's Counsel (d. 2014)
- June 20
  - András Kovács, Hungarian filmmaker (d. 2017)
  - Audie Murphy, American World War II hero and actor (d. 1971)
- June 21
  - Larisa Avdeyeva, Russian mezzo-soprano (d. 2013)
  - Giovanni Spadolini, Prime Minister of Italy (d. 1994)
  - Maureen Stapleton, American actress (d. 2006)
- June 23 – Oliver Smithies, British-American geneticist (d. 2017)
- June 25
  - June Lockhart, American actress (d. 2025)
  - Robert Venturi, American architect (d. 2018)
  - P. Viswambharan, Indian politician, socialist, trade unionist and journalist (d. 2016)
- June 26 – Jean Frydman, French resistant and businessman (d. 2021)
- June 29
  - Giorgio Napolitano, Italian politician and 11th President of Italy (d. 2023)
  - Cara Williams, American actress (d. 2021)
- June 30
  - Ebrahim Amini, Iranian politician (d. 2020)
  - Philippe Jaccottet, Swiss poet and translator (d. 2021)
  - Ros Mey, Cambodian-born American Buddhist monk and survivor of the Khmer Rouge regime (d. 2010)
  - Fred Schaus, American basketball player, head coach and athletic director (d. 2010)

=== July ===
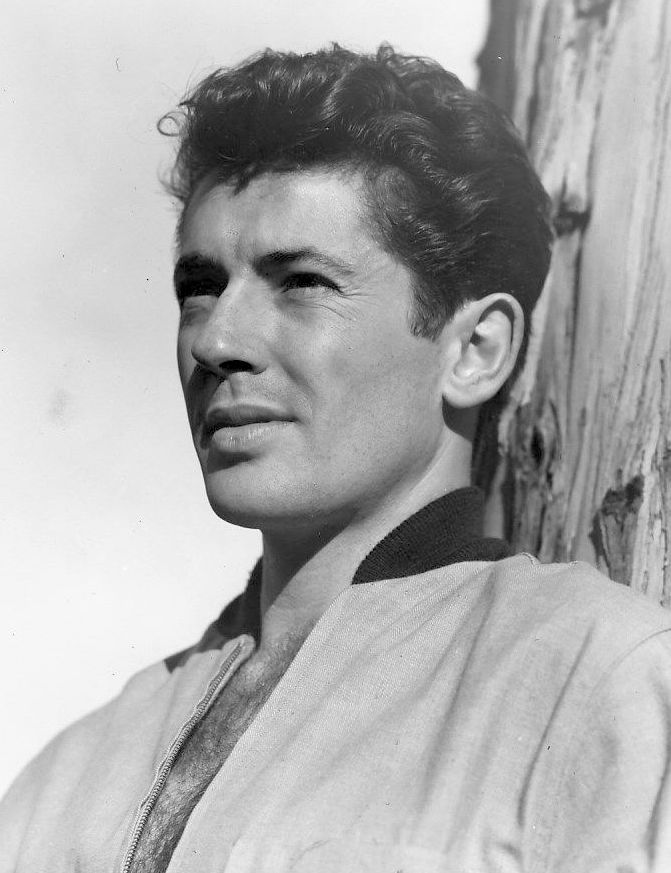
Farley Granger

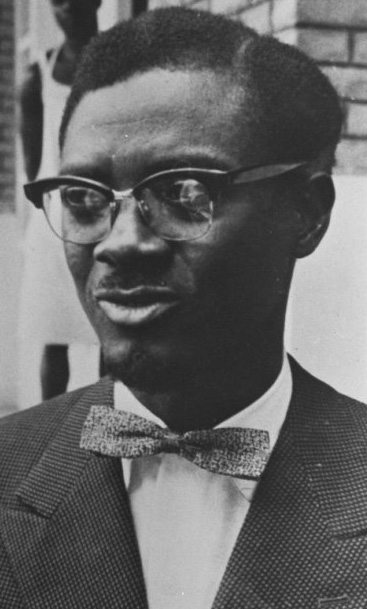
Patrice Lumumba

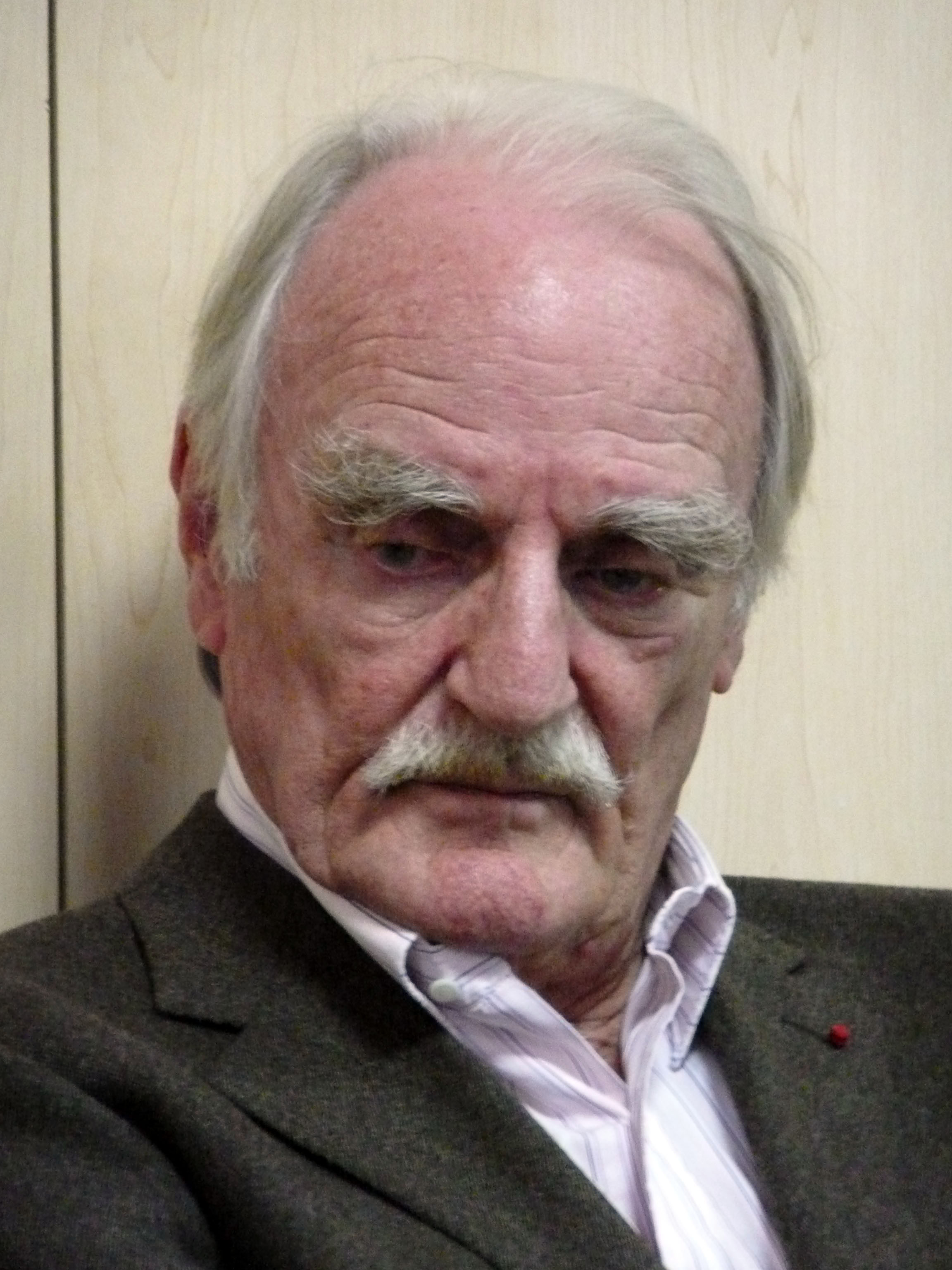
Jean Raspail

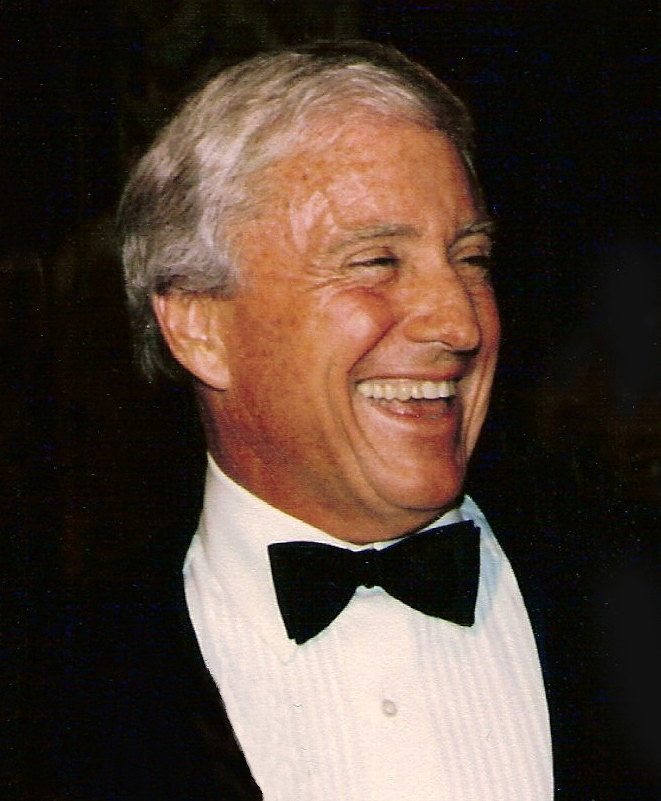
Merv Griffin

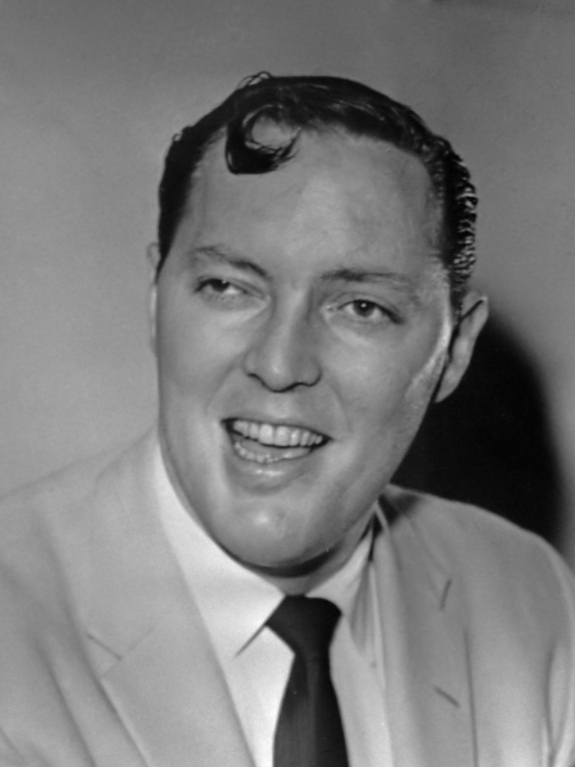
Bill Haley

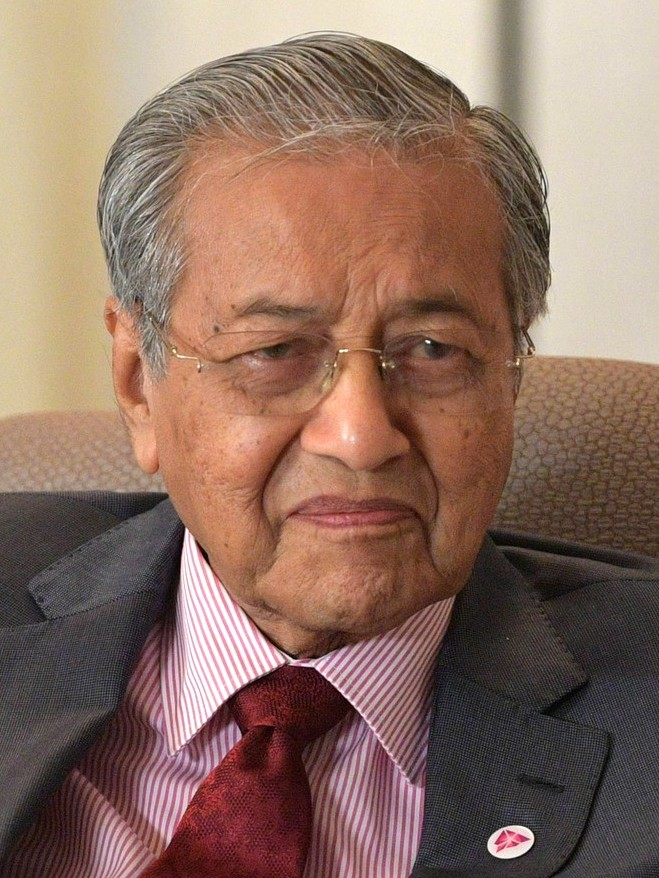
Mahathir Mohamad

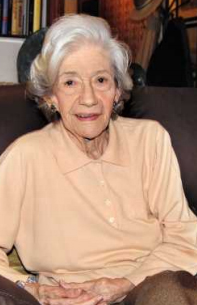
Ana María Matute

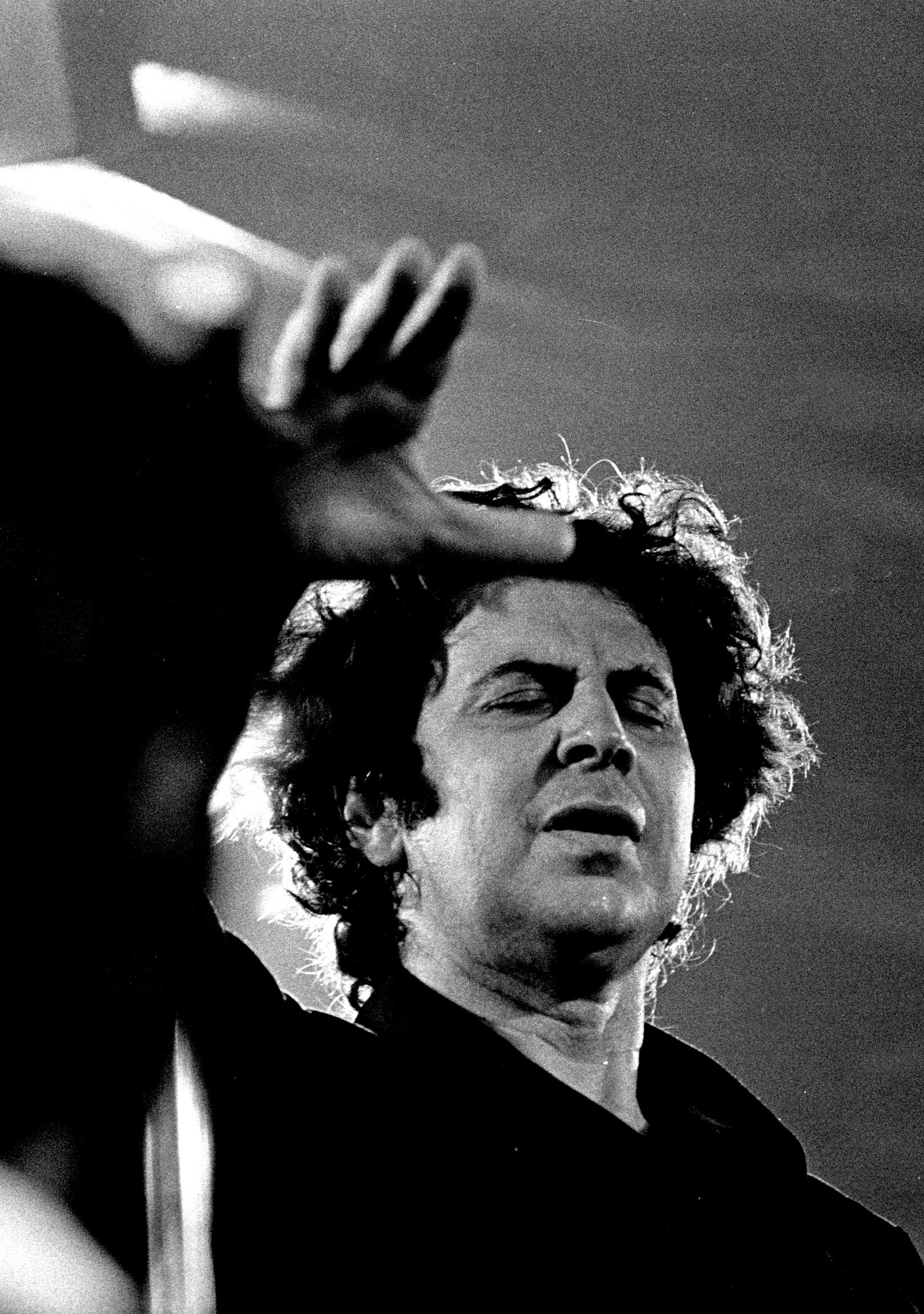
Mikis Theodorakis

- July 1
  - Farley Granger, American actor (d. 2011)
  - Art McNally, American football referee (d. 2023)
- July 2
  - Marvin Rainwater, American country and rockabilly singer and songwriter (d. 2013)
  - Medgar Evers, African-American civil rights activist (d. 1963)
  - Patrice Lumumba, Congolese independence leader (d. 1961)
- July 3 – Roger Chesneau, French steeplechaser (d. 2012)
- July 4 – Dorothy Head Knode, American tennis player (d. 2015)
- July 5
  - Jelesko Grancharoff, Bulgarian-Australian resistance fighter and anarchist (d. 2016)
  - Jean Raspail, French author, traveler and explorer (d. 2020)
  - Fernando de Szyszlo, Peruvian painter, sculptor, printmaker and teacher (d. 2017)
  - Unto Wiitala, Finnish ice hockey player (d. 2019)
- July 6
  - Ruth Cracknell, Australian actress and author (d. 2002)
  - Merv Griffin, American game show host and producer, talk show host, singer (d. 2007)
  - Bill Haley, American musician (d. 1981)
  - Gazi Yaşargil, Turkish scientist and neurosurgeon (d. 2025)
- July 8 – Nicholas Brathwaite, Prime Minister of Grenada (d. 2016)
- July 9
  - Mary de Rachewiltz, Italian-American poet and translator (d. 2026)
  - Borislav Stanković, Serbian basketball player and coach (d. 2020)
- July 10 – Mahathir Mohamad, Malaysian politician; Former prime minister of Malaysia
- July 11
  - Mattiwilda Dobbs, African-American coloratura soprano (d. 2015)
  - Nicolai Gedda, Swedish operatic tenor (d. 2017)
  - David Graham, British actor and voice artist (d. 2024)
  - Fernando Matthei, Chilean Air Force General (d. 2017)
- July 12 – Don Campbell, Canadian ice hockey (d. 2012)
- July 13 – Suzanne Zimmerman, American competition swimmer and Olympic medallist (d. 2021)
- July 14
  - Francisco Álvarez Martínez, Roman Catholic prelate (d. 2022)
  - Elmo Bovio, Argentine professional football player (d. 2017)
  - Carlos Velázquez, Argentine modern pentathlete
- July 15
  - D. A. Pennebaker, American documentary filmmaker (d. 2019)
  - Badal Sarkar, Indian dramatist and theatre director (d. 2011)
- July 16 – Rosita Quintana, Argentine actress (d. 2021)
- July 17
  - Anita Lasker-Wallfisch, German cellist and Holocaust survivor
  - Mohammad Hasan Sharq, Afghan politician
  - Ted Vogel, American marathon runner (d. 2019)
- July 18
  - Allan Elsom, New Zealand rugby union player (d. 2010)
  - Raymond Jones, Australian architect (d. 2022)
  - Shirley Strickland, Australian Olympic athlete (d. 2004)
  - Friedrich Zimmermann, German politician (d. 2012)
- July 19
  - Otto Arosemena, 32nd president of Ecuador (d. 1984)
  - Henri Beaujean, French politician (d. 2021)
  - John Dossetor, Canadian physician and bioethicist (d. 2020)
  - Jack Petchey, English businessman and philanthropist (d. 2024)
  - Michael Pfeiffer, German footballer (d. 2018)
  - Sue Thompson, American singer (d. 2021)
- July 20
  - Jacques Delors, French politician (d. 2023)
  - Frantz Fanon, French-Algerian psychiatrist and philosopher (d. 1961)
  - Eric Watson, New Zealand cricketer (d. 2017)
- July 21
  - Hans Meyer, South African actor (d. 2020)
  - Johnny Peirson, Canadian ice hockey player (d. 2021)
- July 22 – Joseph Sargent, American film director (d. 2014)
- July 23
  - Tajuddin Ahmad, 1st prime minister of Bangladesh (d. 1975)
  - G. Holmes Braddock, American politician (d. 2025)
  - Gloria DeHaven, American actress (d. 2016)
  - Quett Masire, 2nd President of Botswana (d. 2017)
- July 24
  - Stephen Porter, American stage director (d. 2013)
  - Miiko Taka, American actress (d. 2023)
- July 25
  - Jutta Zilliacus, Finnish journalist and politician (d. 2026)
  - Ana González de Recabarren, Chilean human rights activist (d. 2018)
- July 26
  - Robert Hirsch, French actor (d. 2017)
  - Ana María Matute, Spanish writer (d. 2014)
- July 28
  - Baruch Samuel Blumberg, American scientist, recipient of the Nobel Prize in Physiology or Medicine (d. 2011)
  - Ali Bozer, Turkish politician (d. 2020)
- July 29
  - S. D. Phadnis, Indian cartoonist
  - Carmen Stănescu, Romanian actress (d. 2018)
  - Mikis Theodorakis, Greek composer (d. 2021)
- July 31 – Carmel Quinn, Irish-American singer (d. 2021)

=== August ===
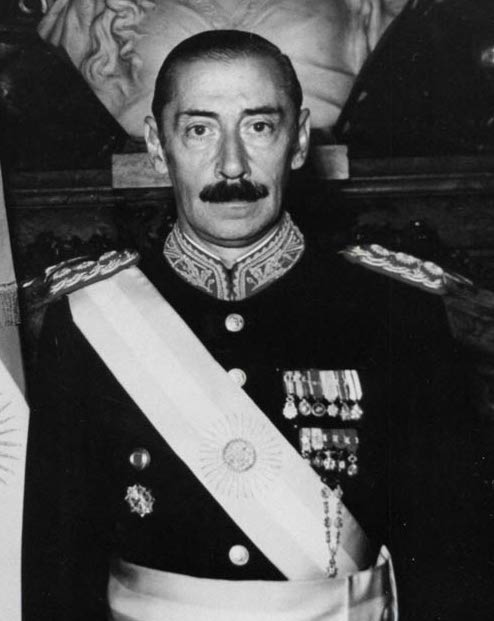
Jorge Rafael Videla

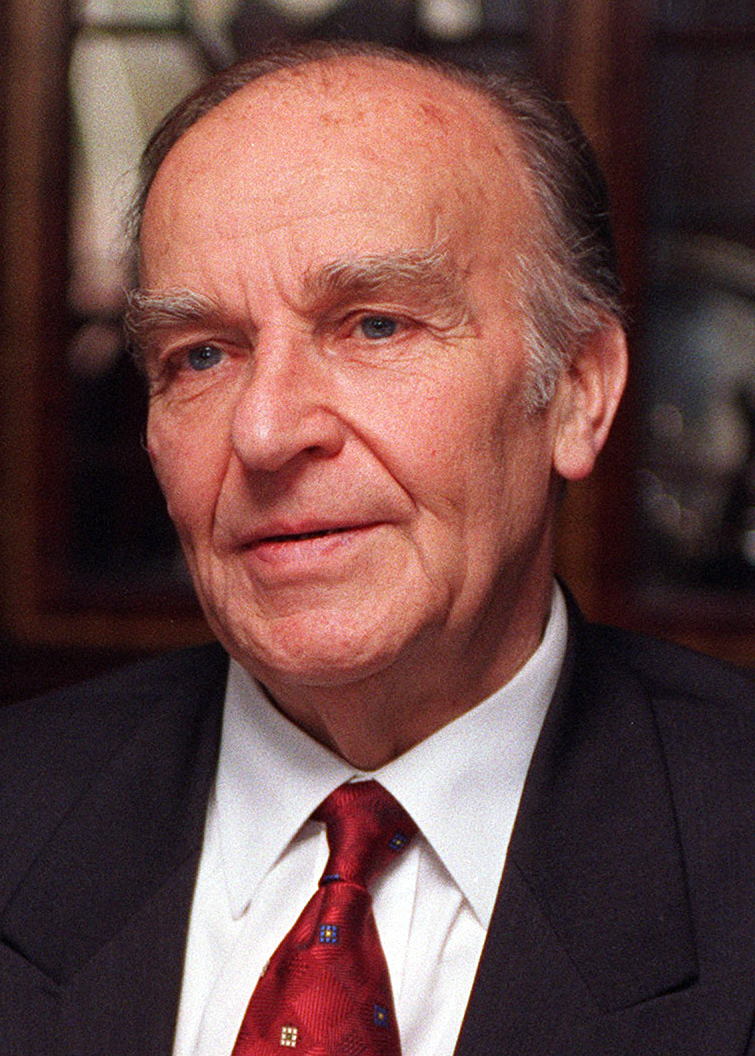
Alija Izetbegović

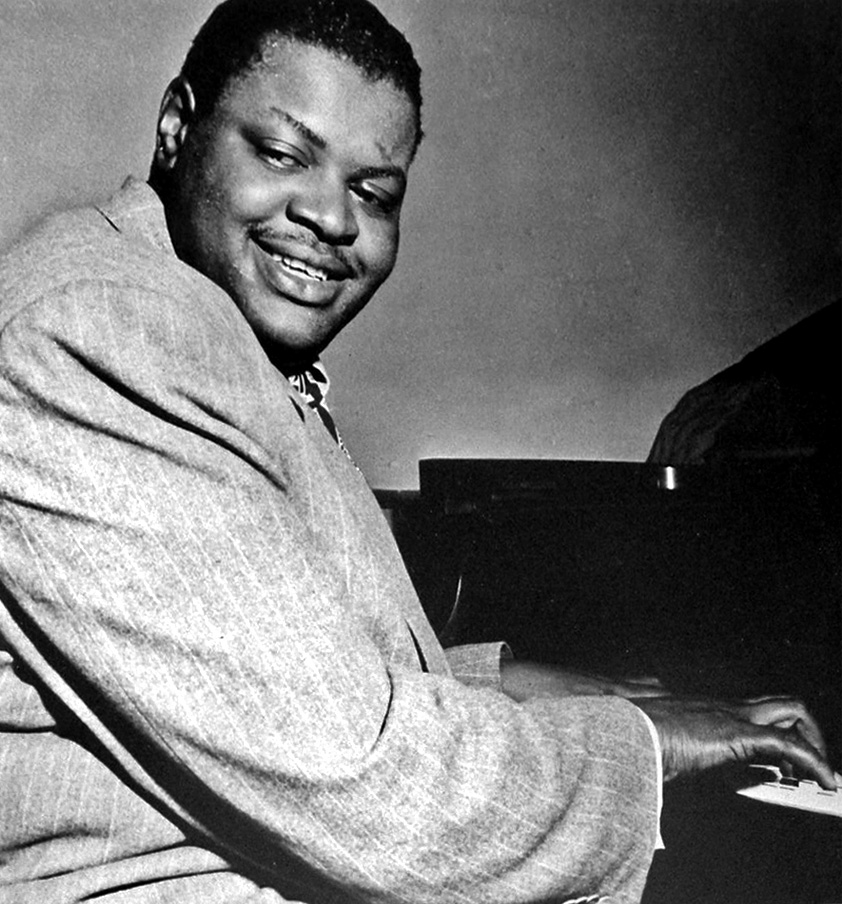
Oscar Peterson

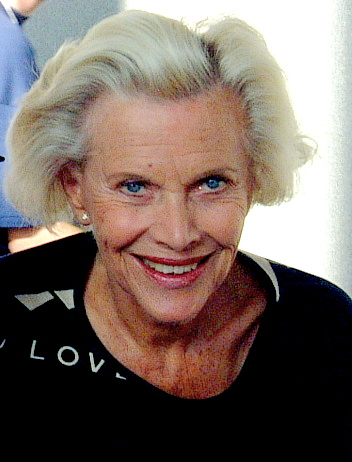
Honor Blackman

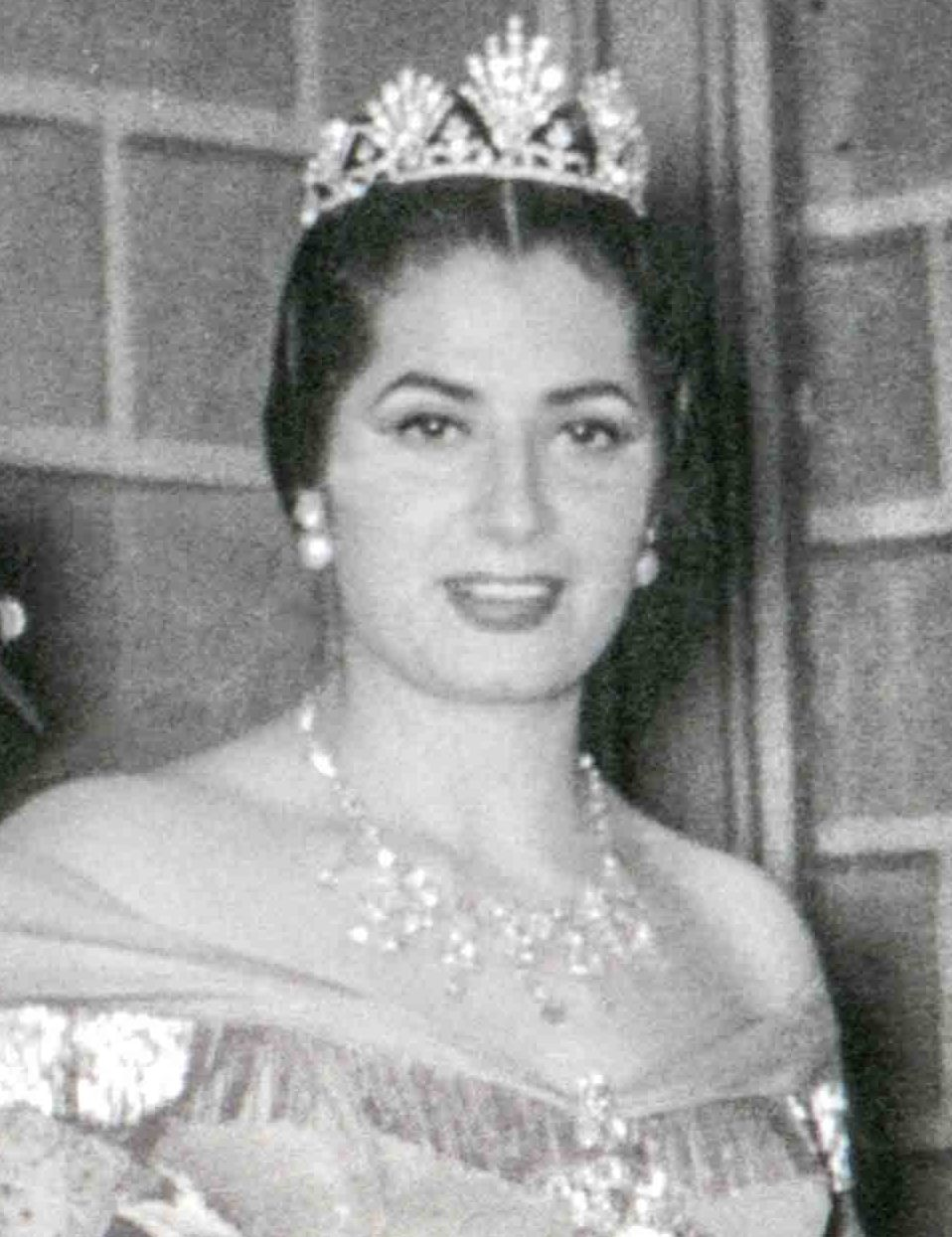
Juanita Reina

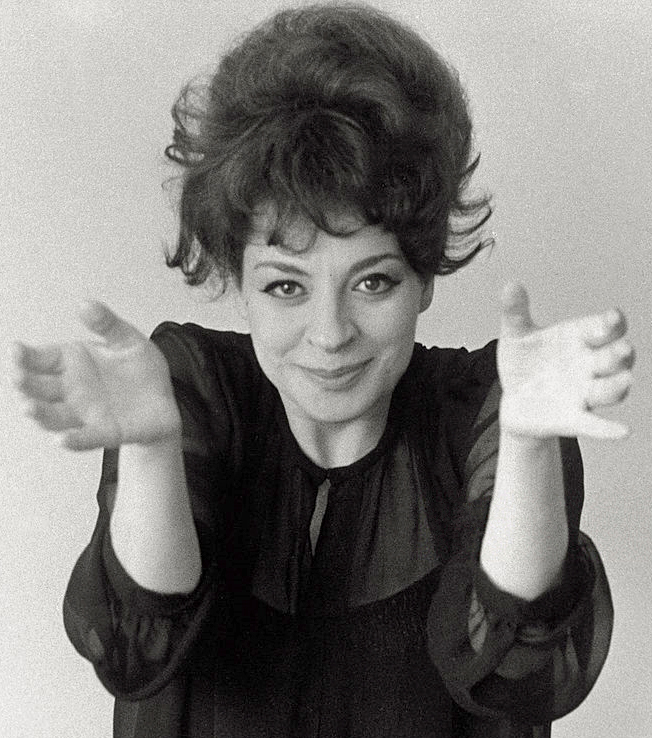
Katyna Ranieri

- August 2
  - Princess Marie Gabrielle of Luxembourg, Princess of Luxembourg (d. 2023)
  - Jorge Rafael Videla, 42nd president of Argentina (d. 2013)
- August 3
  - Marv Levy, American football coach and executive
  - Dom Um Romão, Brazilian jazz drummer (d. 2005)
- August 6
  - Eddie Baily, England international footballer (d. 2010)
  - Barbara Bates, American actress and singer (d. 1969)
  - Lilyan Chauvin, French-American actress (d. 2008)
- August 7 – M. S. Swaminathan, Indian scientist (d. 2023)
- August 8
  - Alija Izetbegović, President of Bosnia-Herzegovina (d. 2003)
  - Aziz Sattar, Malaysian actor, comedian, singer and director (d. 2014)
  - Ginny Tyler, American voice actress (d. 2012)
- August 9
  - David A. Huffman, American computer scientist (d. 1999)
  - Valentín Pimstein, Chilean-Mexican producer of telenovelas (d. 2017)
  - Olavi Rokka, Finnish modern pentathlete (d. 2011)
- August 10 – Stanislav Brebera, Czech chemist (d. 2012)
- August 11 – Arlene Dahl, American actress (d. 2021)
- August 12
  - Guillermo Cano Isaza, Colombian journalist (d. 1986)
  - Leopold Barschandt, Austrian footballer (d. 2000)
  - George Wetherill, geophysicist (d. 2006)
  - Dale Bumpers, American politician (d. 2016)
- August 13
  - José Alfredo Martínez de Hoz, Argentine executive and policy maker (d. 2013)
  - Peter Beaven, New Zealand architect based in Christchurch (d. 2012)
- August 15
  - Mike Connors, American actor (d. 2017)
  - Oscar Peterson, Canadian jazz pianist (d. 2007)
  - Aldo Ciccolini, Italian-born French pianist (d. 2015)
- August 16 – Kirke Mechem, American composer
- August 18 – Pegeen Vail Guggenheim, Swiss-American painter (d. 1967)
- August 19 – Madhav Dalvi, Indian cricketer (d. 2012)
- August 20
  - Stan Hovdebo, New Democratic Party member of the Canadian House of Commons (d. 2018)
  - Henning Larsen, Danish architect (d. 2013)
- August 21 – Toma Caragiu, Romanian theatre, television and film actor (d. 1977)
- August 22 – Honor Blackman, English actress (d. 2020)
- August 26 – Etelka Keserű, Hungarian economist and politician (d. 2018)
- August 27
  - Andrea Cordero Lanza di Montezemolo, Italian Roman Catholic cardinal and Vatican diplomat (d. 2017)
  - Nat Lofthouse, English footballer (d. 2011)
  - Jaswant Singh Neki, Indian academic and poet (d. 2015)
- August 28
  - Donald O'Connor, American actor, singer and dancer (d. 2003)
  - José Parra Martínez, Spanish footballer (d. 2016)
- August 29 – Demetrio B. Lakas, President of Panama (d. 1999)
- August 31
  - Ted Blakey, American historian, activist, and businessman (d. 2004)
  - Maurice Pialat, French actor and director (d. 2003)

=== September ===
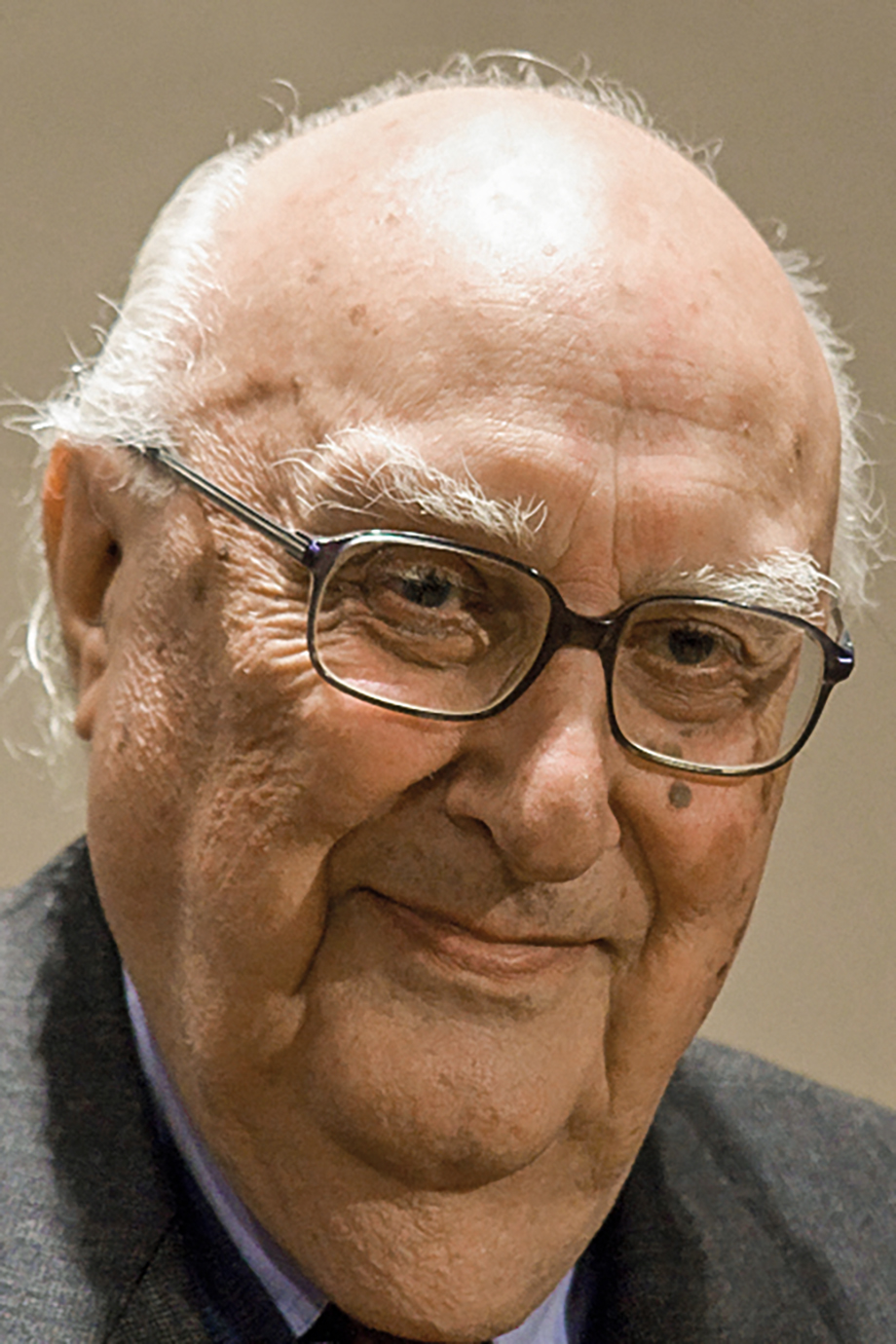
Andrea Camilleri

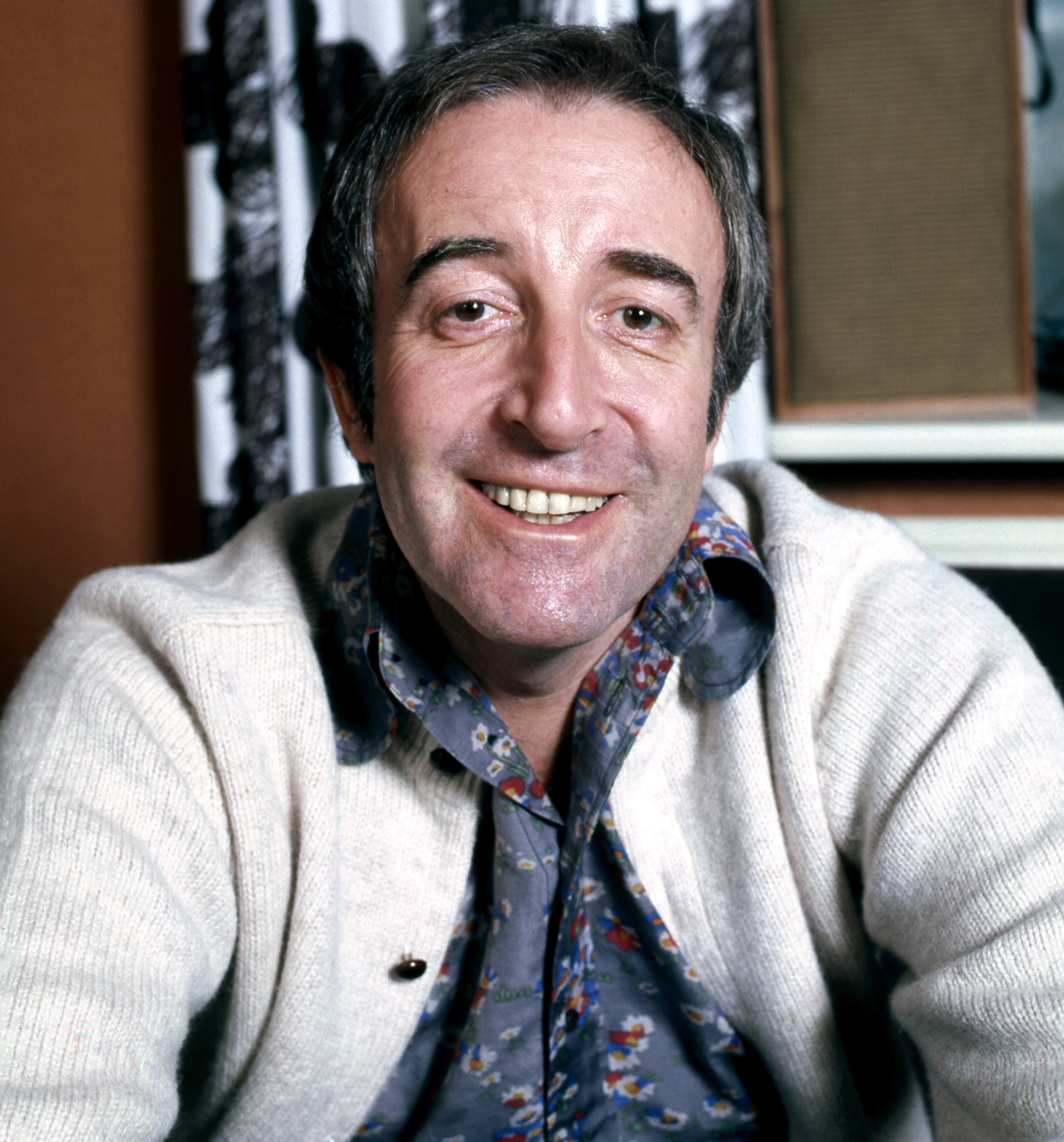
Peter Sellers

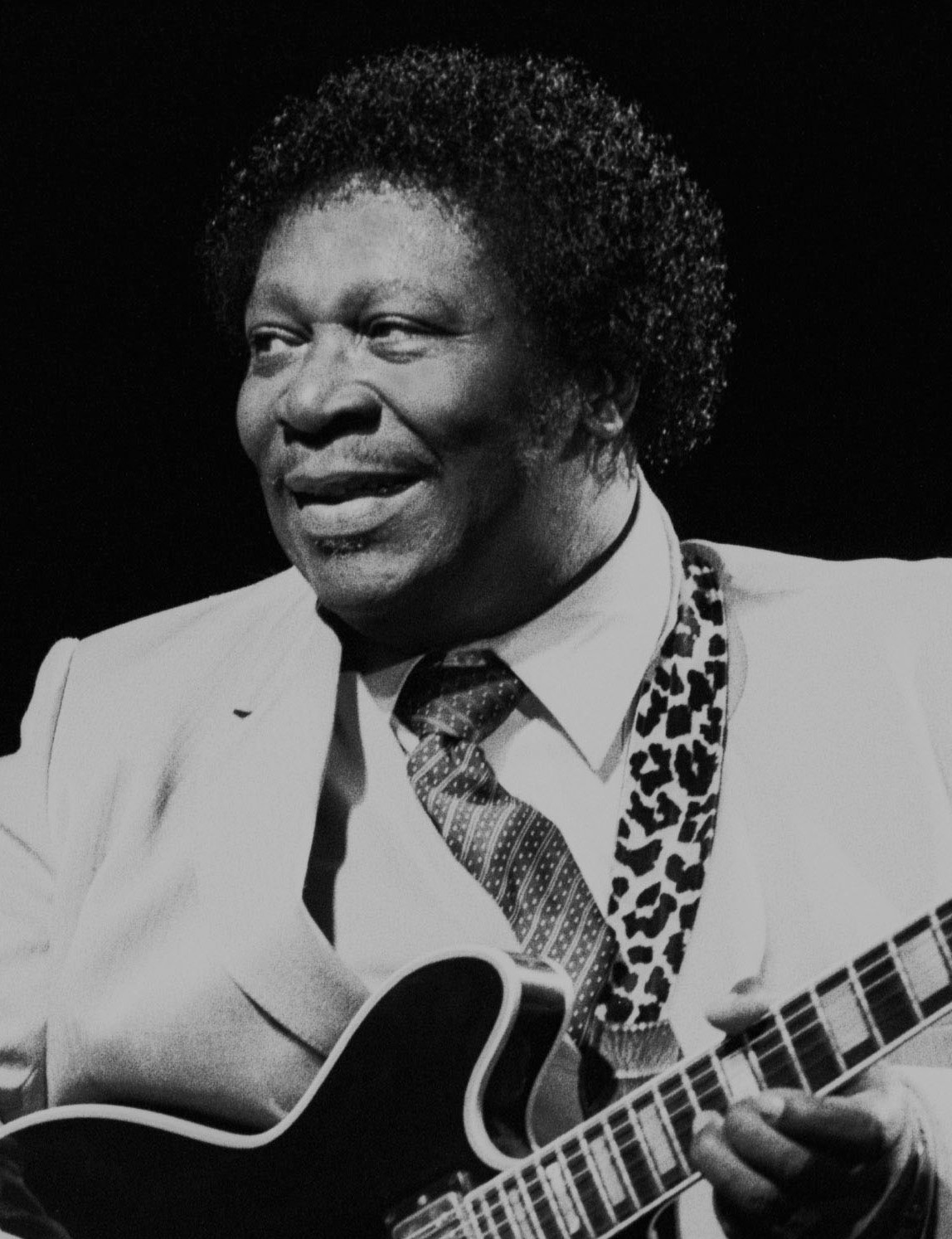
B. B. King

- September 1
  - Michael J. Cleary, Irish Roman Catholic bishop (d. 2020)
  - Art Pepper, American musician (d. 1982)
  - Ihor Yukhnovskyi, Ukrainian physicist and politician (d. 2024)
- September 3 – Shoista Mullojonova, Tajik-born Shashmakom singer (d. 2010)
- September 6 – Andrea Camilleri, Italian writer and director (d. 2019)
- September 7 – Laura Ashley, Welsh designer (d. 1985)
- September 8
  - Jacqueline Ceballos, American feminist
  - Peter Sellers, English comedian and actor (d. 1980)
- September 10
  - Marthe Gautier, French medical doctor and researcher known for discovering the link of diseases to chromosome abnormalities (d. 2022)
  - Boris Tchaikovsky, Soviet and Russian composer (d. 1996)
- September 11 – Armando Monteiro Filho, Brazilian businessman, engineer and politician (d. 2018)
- September 13 – Mel Tormé, American musician (d. 1999)
- September 14 – Winston Cenac, 3rd prime minister of Saint Lucia (d. 2004)
- September 15 – Helle Virkner, Danish actress (d. 2009)
- September 16
  - Eugene Garfield, American linguist and businessman (d. 2017)
  - Charles Haughey, sixth Taoiseach (head of government of the Republic of Ireland) (d. 2006)
  - B. B. King, American singer-songwriter and guitarist (d. 2015)
  - Morgan Woodward, American actor (d. 2019)
  - Martha Firestone Ford, American Businesswoman and former principal owner of the Detroit Lions
- September 19 – Pete Murray, British Radio and television presenter
- September 20 – Ananda Mahidol, King Rama VIII of Siam (d. 1946)
- September 23 – Angelo Acerbi, Italian Catholic archbishop and cardinal
- September 24 – Autar Singh Paintal, Indian medical scientist (d. 2004)
- September 25
  - Paul B. MacCready Jr., American aeronautical engineer (d. 2007)
  - Silvana Pampanini, Italian actress (d. 2016)
  - Hasan Tiro, Indonesian politician (d. 2010)
- September 26
  - Marty Robbins, American singer-songwriter and racing driver (d. 1982)
  - Bobby Shantz, American Baseball Player
- September 27 – Robert G. Edwards, British Nobel Prize-winning physiologist (d. 2013)
- September 28 – Cromwell Everson, South African composer (d. 1991)
- September 30
  - Joseph Hitti, Lebanese Catholic bishop (d. 2022)
  - Arkady Ostashev, Russian scientist and rocket engineer (d. 1998)

=== October ===
Simone Segouin

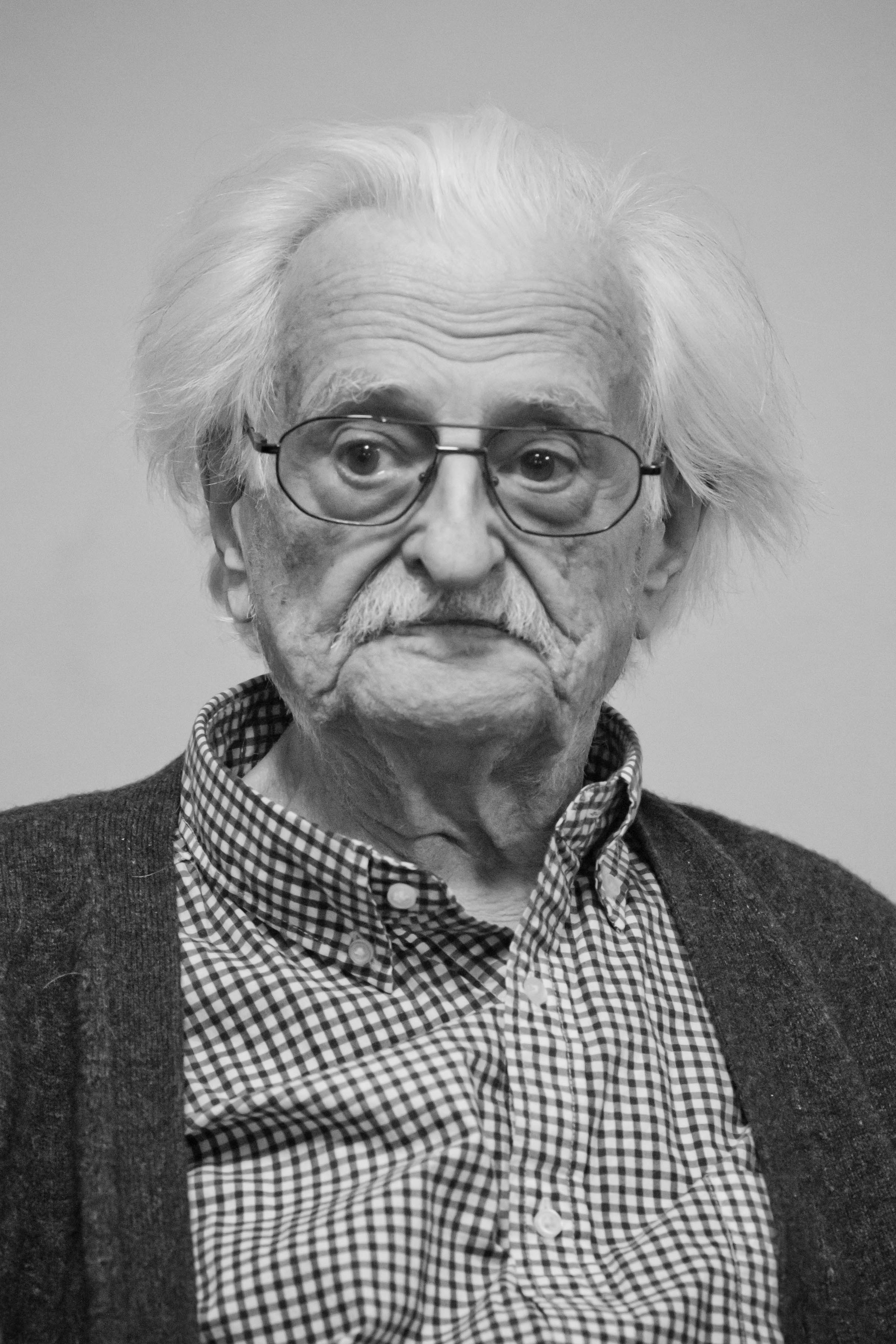
Marlen Khutsiev

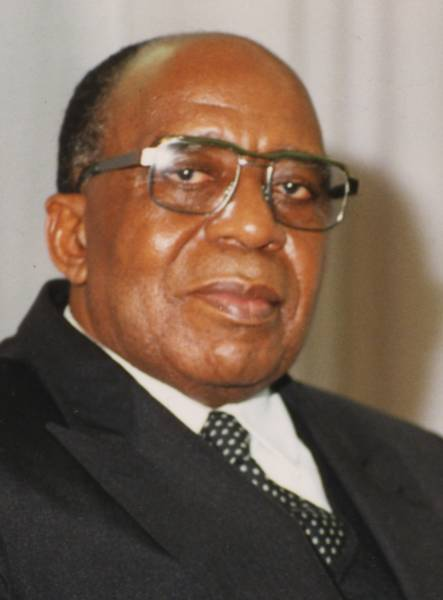
Antoine Gizenga

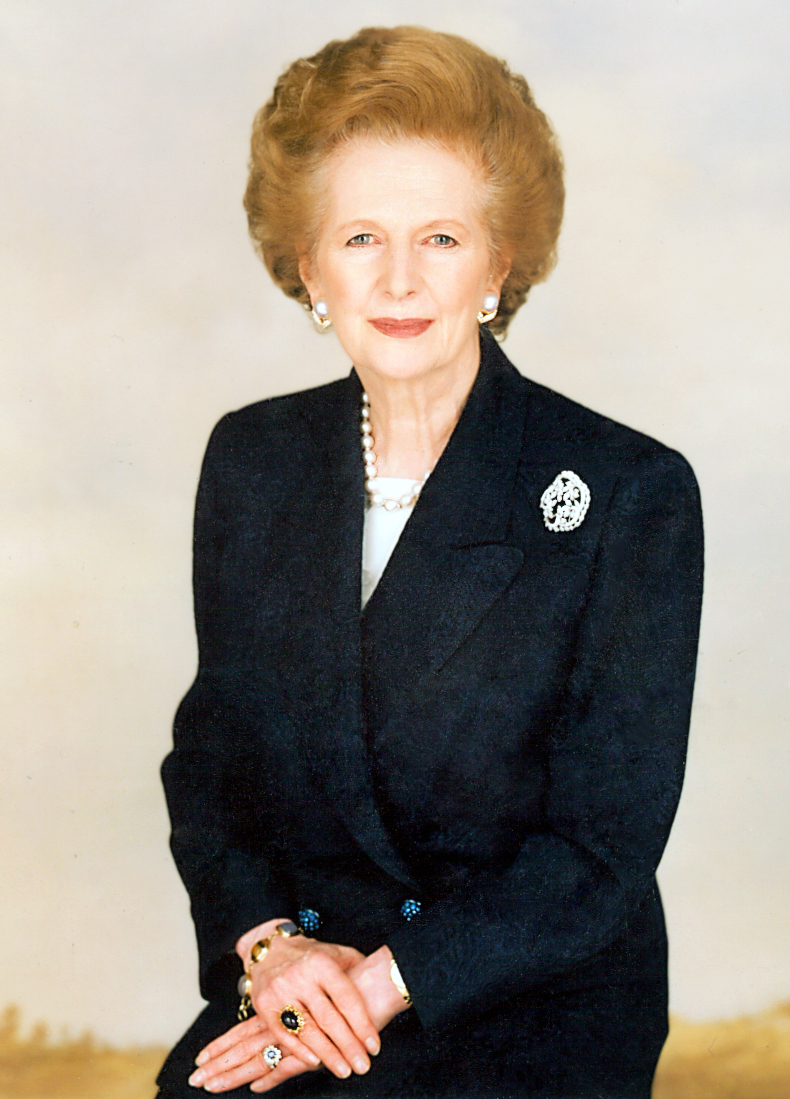
Margaret Thatcher

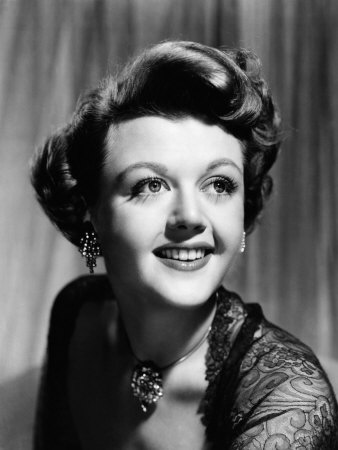
Dame Angela Lansbury

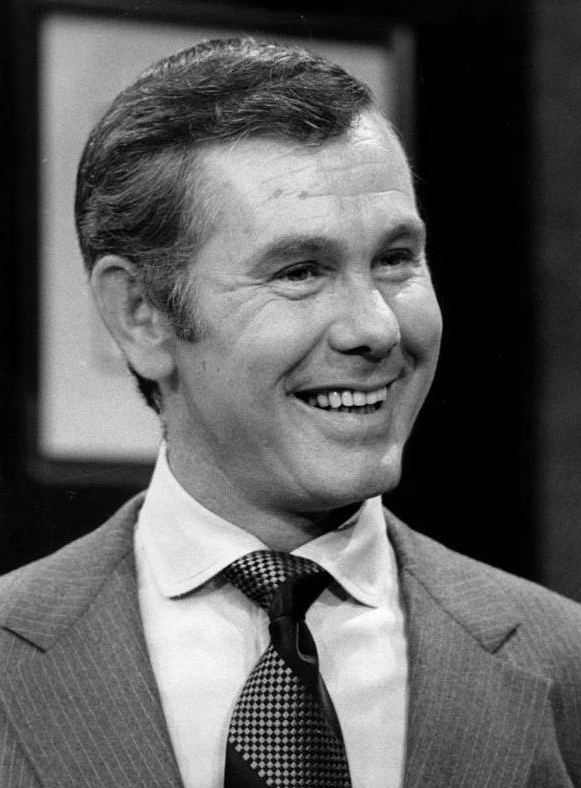
Johnny Carson

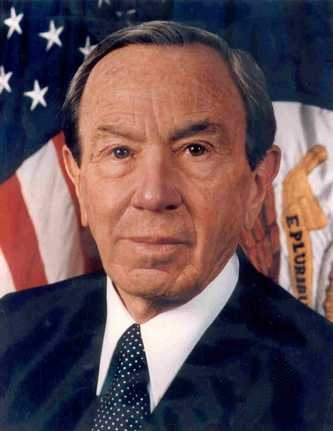
Warren Christopher

- October 1 – Yang Hyong-sop, North Korean politician (d. 2022)
- October 2 – José A. Martínez Suárez, Argentine film director and screenwriter (d. 2019)
- October 3
  - Simone Segouin (also known as Nicole Minet), French Resistance fighter and partisan (d. 2023)
  - Gore Vidal, American author (d. 2012)
- October 4 – Fyodor Terentyev, Soviet Olympic cross-country skier (d. 1963)
- October 5
  - Gail Davis, American actress (d. 1997)
  - Antoine Gizenga, Prime Minister of the Democratic Republic of the Congo (d. 2019)
  - Herbert Kretzmer, South African-English journalist and songwriter (d. 2020)
  - Murray Riley, Australian rower (d. 2020)
- October 7 – Mildred Earp, American female professional baseball player (d. 2017)
- October 8 – Álvaro Magaña, 38th president of El Salvador (d. 2001)
- October 9 – Isyaku Rabiu, Nigerian businessman (d. 2018)
- October 11 – Elmore Leonard, American novelist (d. 2013)
- October 13
  - Lenny Bruce, American comic (d. 1966)
  - Carlos Robles Piquer, Spanish diplomat and politician (d. 2018)
  - Margaret Thatcher, Prime Minister of the United Kingdom from 1979 to 1990 (d. 2013)
- October 14 – Phillip V. Tobias, South African palaeoanthropologist (d. 2012)
- October 15 – Bob Rowland Smith, Australian politician (d. 2012)
- October 16
  - Daniel J. Evans, American politician (d. 2024)
  - Dame Angela Lansbury, Irish-British-born American actress (d. 2022)
- October 18 – Ramiz Alia, 13th president of Albania (d. 2011)
- October 19
  - Emilio Eduardo Massera, Argentine Naval military officer (d. 2010)
  - Raymond Impanis, Belgian cyclist (d. 2010)
- October 20
  - Art Buchwald, American humorist and columnist (d. 2007)
  - Hiromu Nonaka, Japanese politician (d. 2018)
- October 21
  - Surjit Singh Barnala, Indian politician (d. 2017)
  - Celia Cruz, Cuban-American singer (d. 2003)
  - Virginia Zeani, Romanian soprano (d. 2023)
- October 22
  - Edith Kawelohea McKinzie, Hawaiian genealogist, author and hula expert (d. 2014)
  - Robert Rauschenberg, American painter and graphic artist (d. 2008)
- October 23
  - Johnny Carson, American comedian and television host (d. 2005)
  - José Freire Falcão, Brazilian cardinal (d. 2021)
  - Manos Hadjidakis, Greek composer (d. 1994)
- October 24
  - Luciano Berio, Italian composer (d. 2003)
  - Ieng Sary, Vietnamese-Cambodian politician (d. 2013)
- October 25
  - Aliya Moldagulova, Soviet soldier and sniper (d. 1944)
- October 27
  - Warren Christopher, American diplomat (d. 2011)
  - Paul Fox, English television executive (d. 2024)
  - Jiro Ono, Japanese chef
- October 29
  - Robert Hardy, English actor (d. 2017)
  - Klaus Roth, German-born British mathematician (d. 2015)
- October 31
  - Ngaire Lane, New Zealand swimmer (d. 2021)
  - John Pople, English chemist, Nobel Prize laureate (d. 2004)

=== November ===
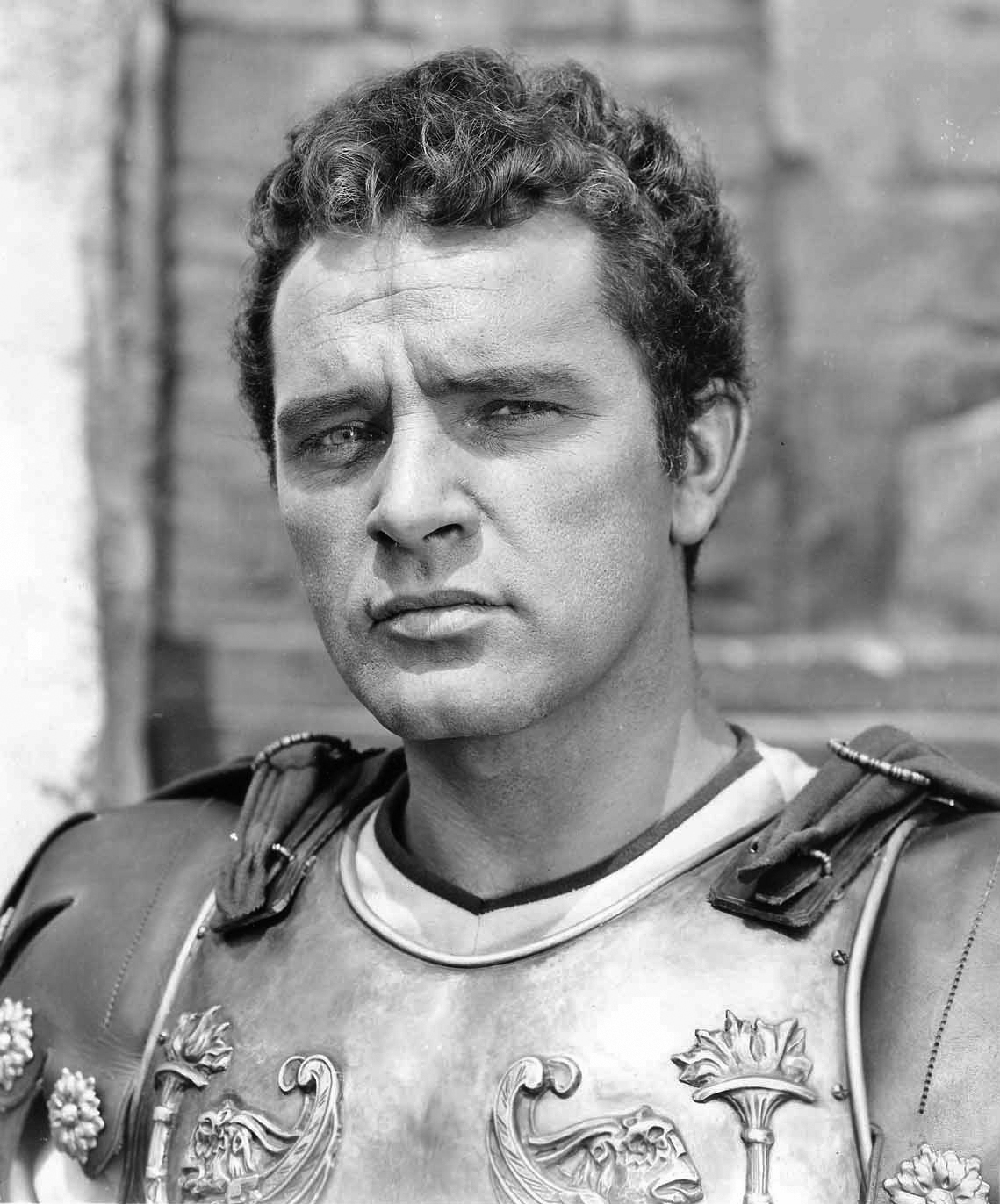
Richard Burton

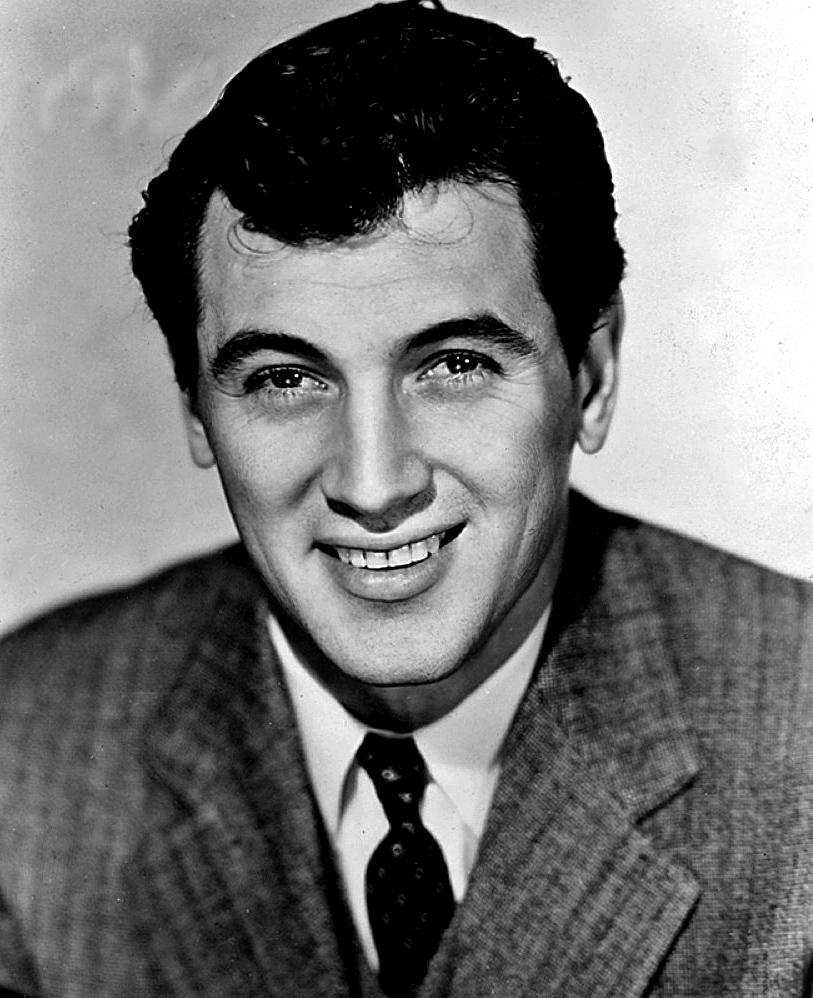
Rock Hudson

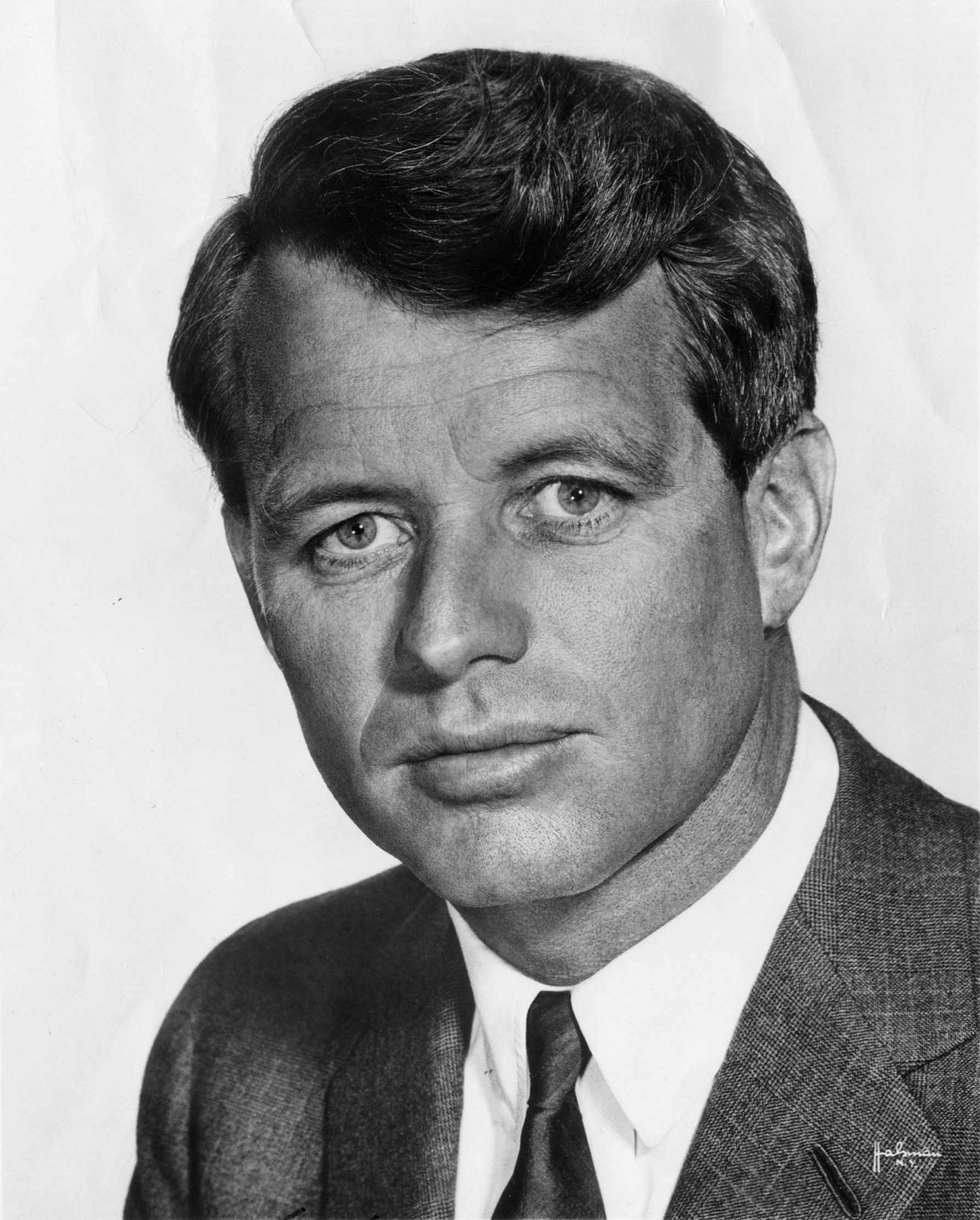
Robert F. Kennedy

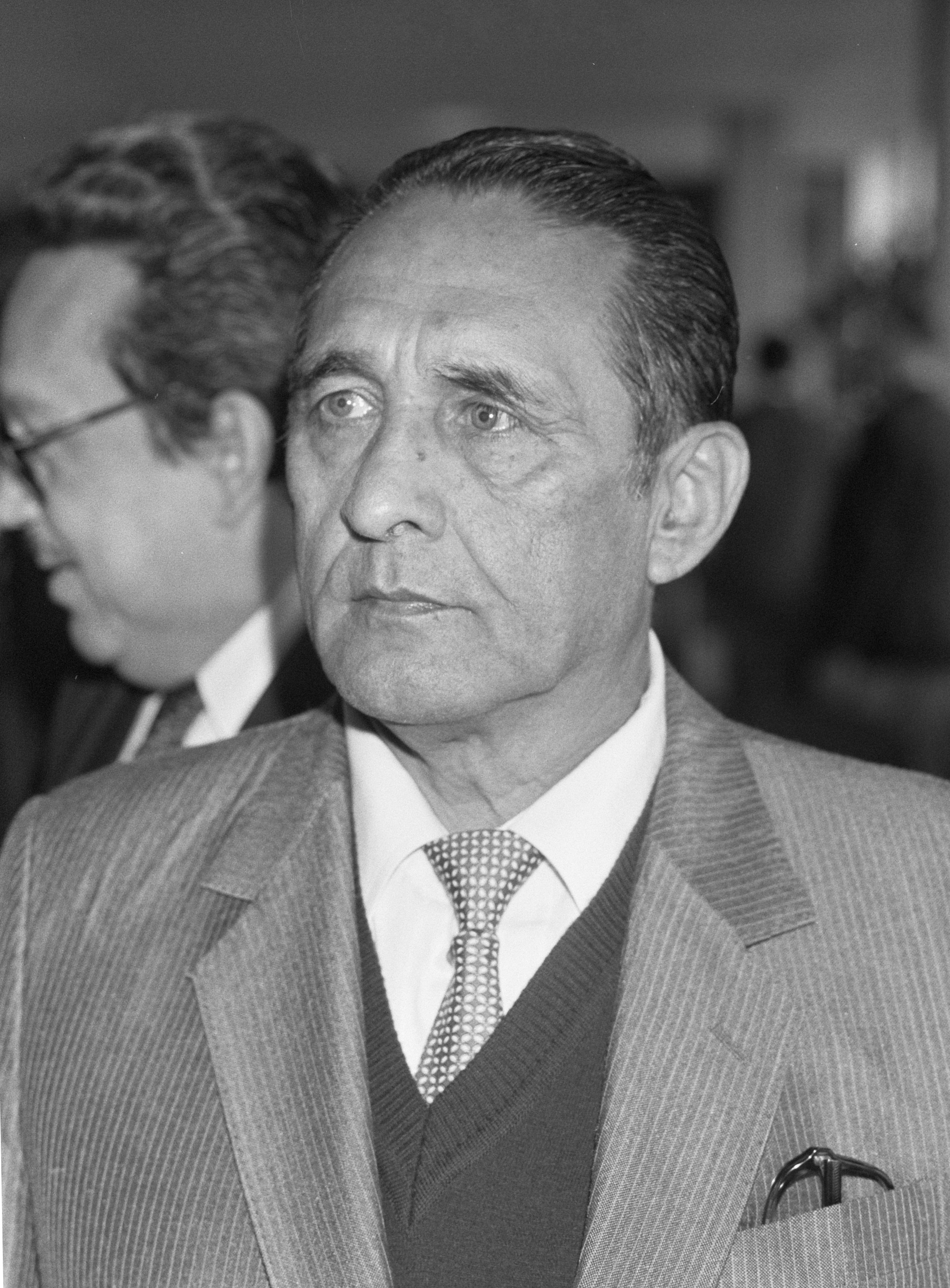
José Napoleón Duarte

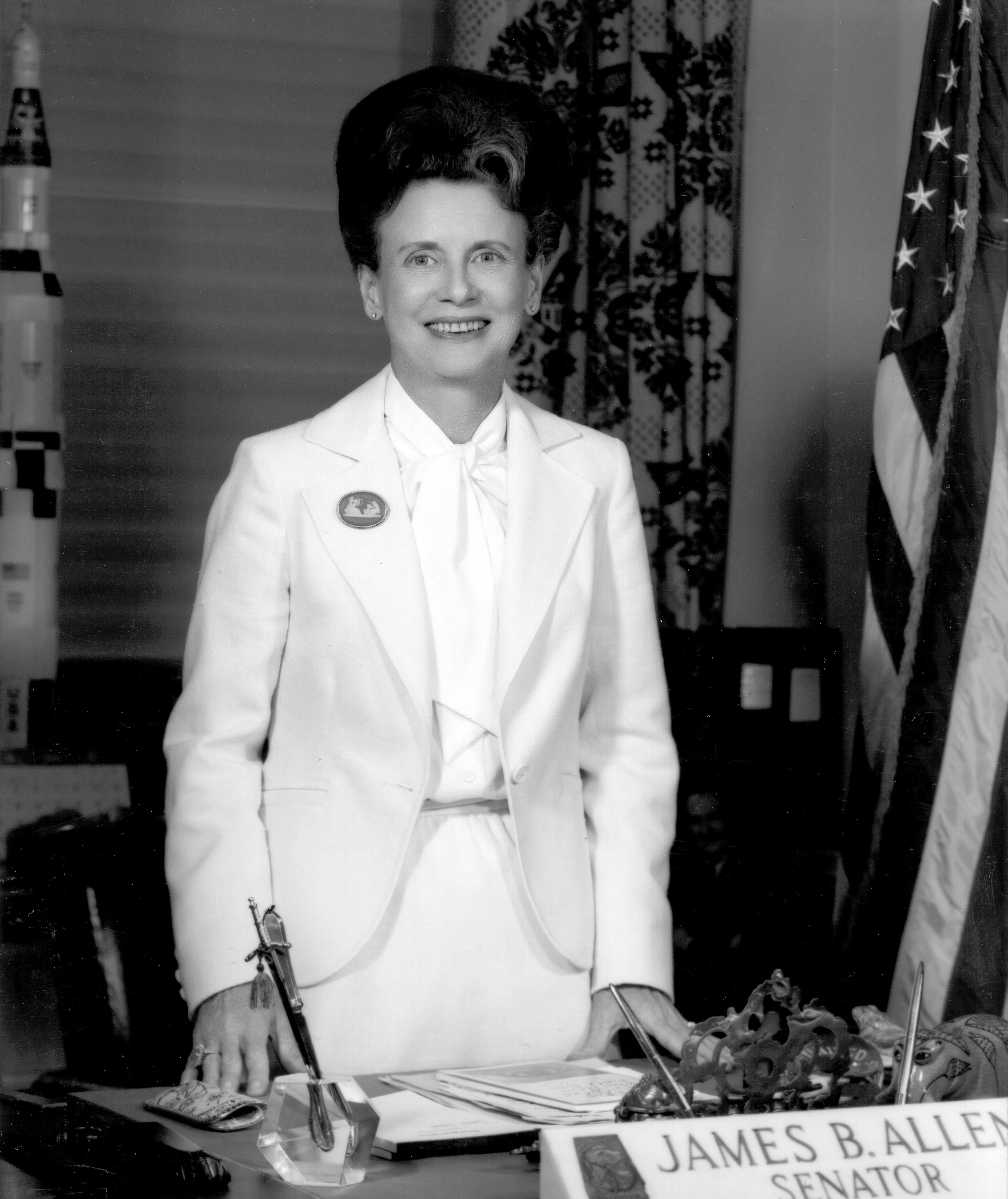
Maryon Pittman Allen

- November 2 – Leif Hermansen, Danish rower (d. 2005)
- November 4
  - Kjerstin Dellert, Swedish opera singer (d. 2018)
  - Doris Roberts, American actress (d. 2016)
- November 6 – Michel Bouquet, French actor (d. 2022)
- November 8 – Asunción Balaguer, Spanish actress (d. 2019)
- November 9 – Giovanni Coppa, Italian cardinal (d. 2016)
- November 10 – Richard Burton, Welsh actor, better known for his role in Cleopatra (d. 1984)
- November 11
  - Dame June Whitfield, English actress (d. 2018)
  - Jonathan Winters, American actor and comedian (d. 2013)
- November 12 – Heinz Schubert, German actor (d. 1999)
- November 17 – Rock Hudson, American actor (d. 1985)
- November 19 – Zygmunt Bauman, Polish military officer, sociologist and philosopher (d. 2017)
- November 20
  - Robert F. Kennedy, American politician, Attorney General of the United States and a leading 1968 Democratic presidential candidate (d. 1968)
  - Maya Plisetskaya, Russian-Lithuanian ballerina (d. 2015)
- November 22
  - Miki Muster, Slovenian artist (d. 2018)
  - Gunther Schuller, American musician (d. 2015)
- November 23
  - José Napoleón Duarte, Salvadoran politician, 39th President of El Salvador (d. 1990)
  - Johnny Mandel, American composer and conductor (d. 2020)
  - William Tebeau, African-American engineer (d. 2013)
- November 24
  - William F. Buckley Jr., American journalist, author and commentator (d. 2008)
  - Simon van der Meer, Dutch physicist, Nobel Prize laureate (d. 2011)
- November 26
  - Gregorio Conrado Álvarez, Uruguayan general and dictator (d. 2016)
  - Eugene Istomin, American pianist (d. 2003)
- November 27
  - Claude Lanzmann, French filmmaker (d. 2018)
  - Ernie Wise, English comedian (d. 1999)
- November 30
  - Lise Bourdin, French actress (d. 2025)
  - Maryon Pittman Allen, American politician and journalist (d. 2018)
  - Hayashiya Sanpei I, Japanese comedian (d. 1980)

=== December ===
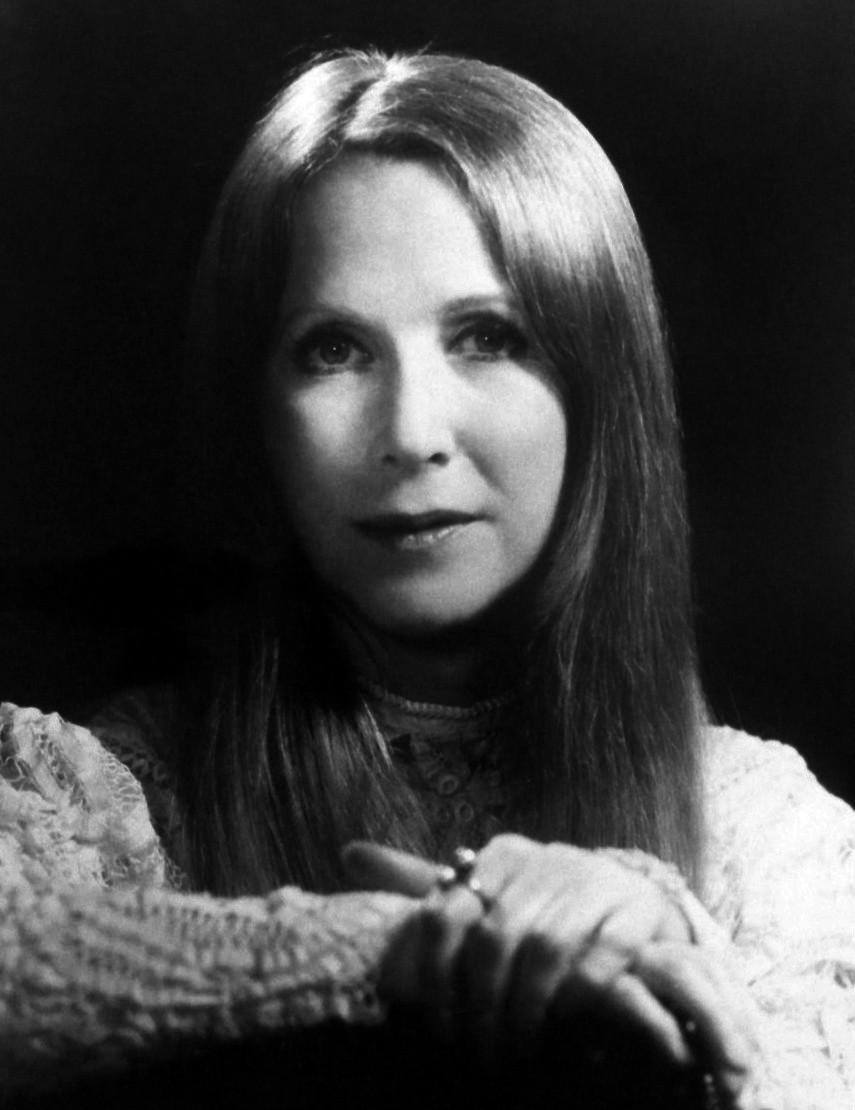
Julie Harris

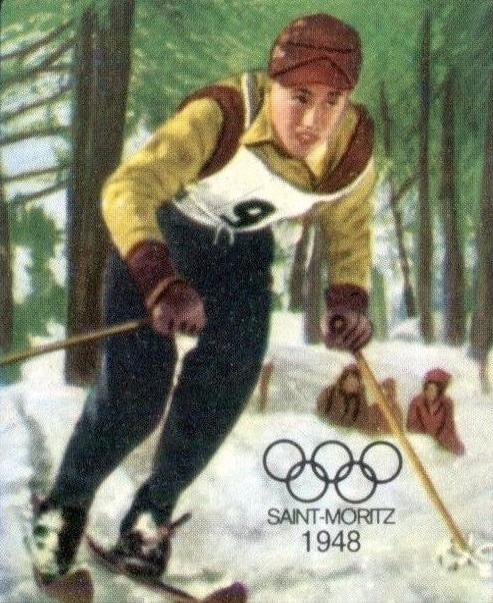
Henri Oreiller

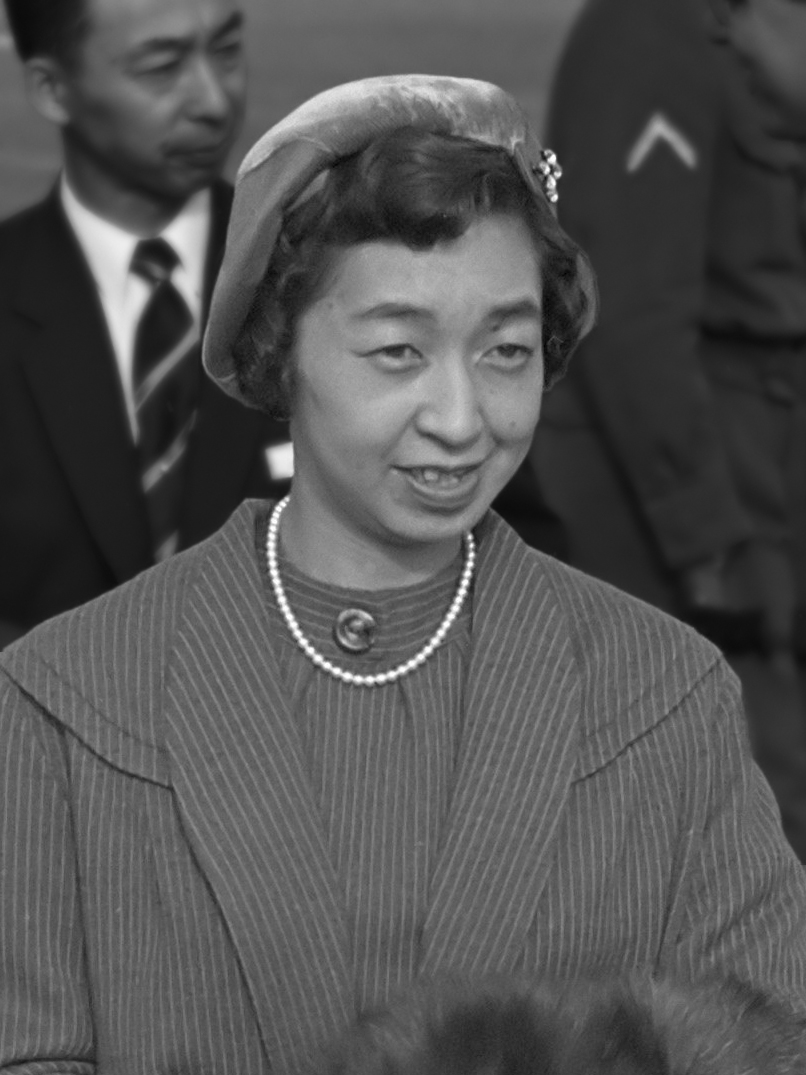
Shigeko Higashikuni

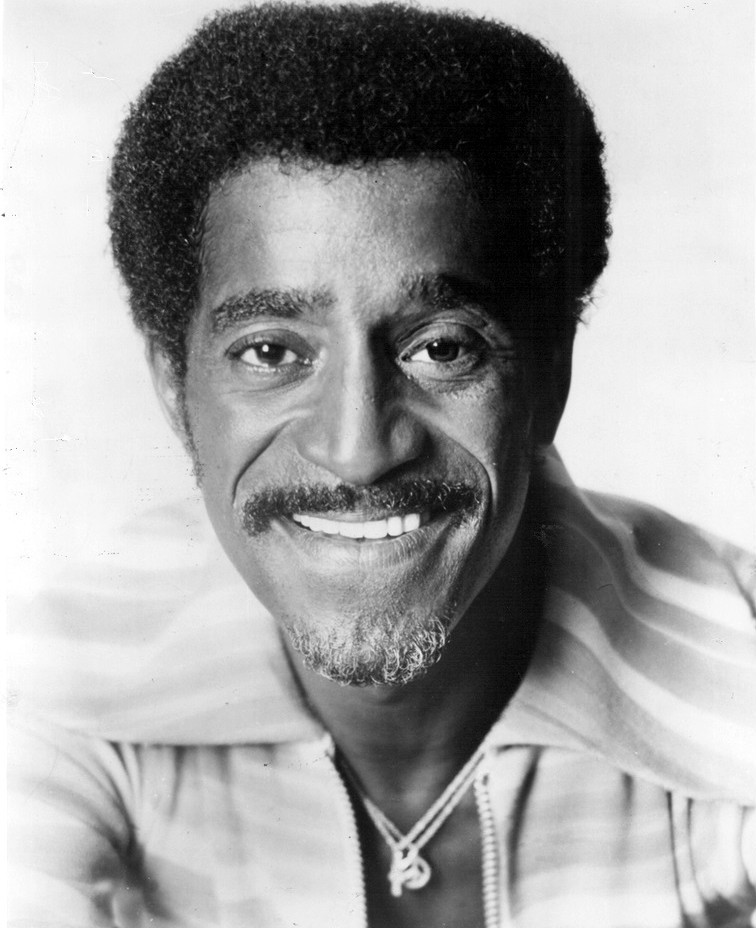
Sammy Davis Jr.

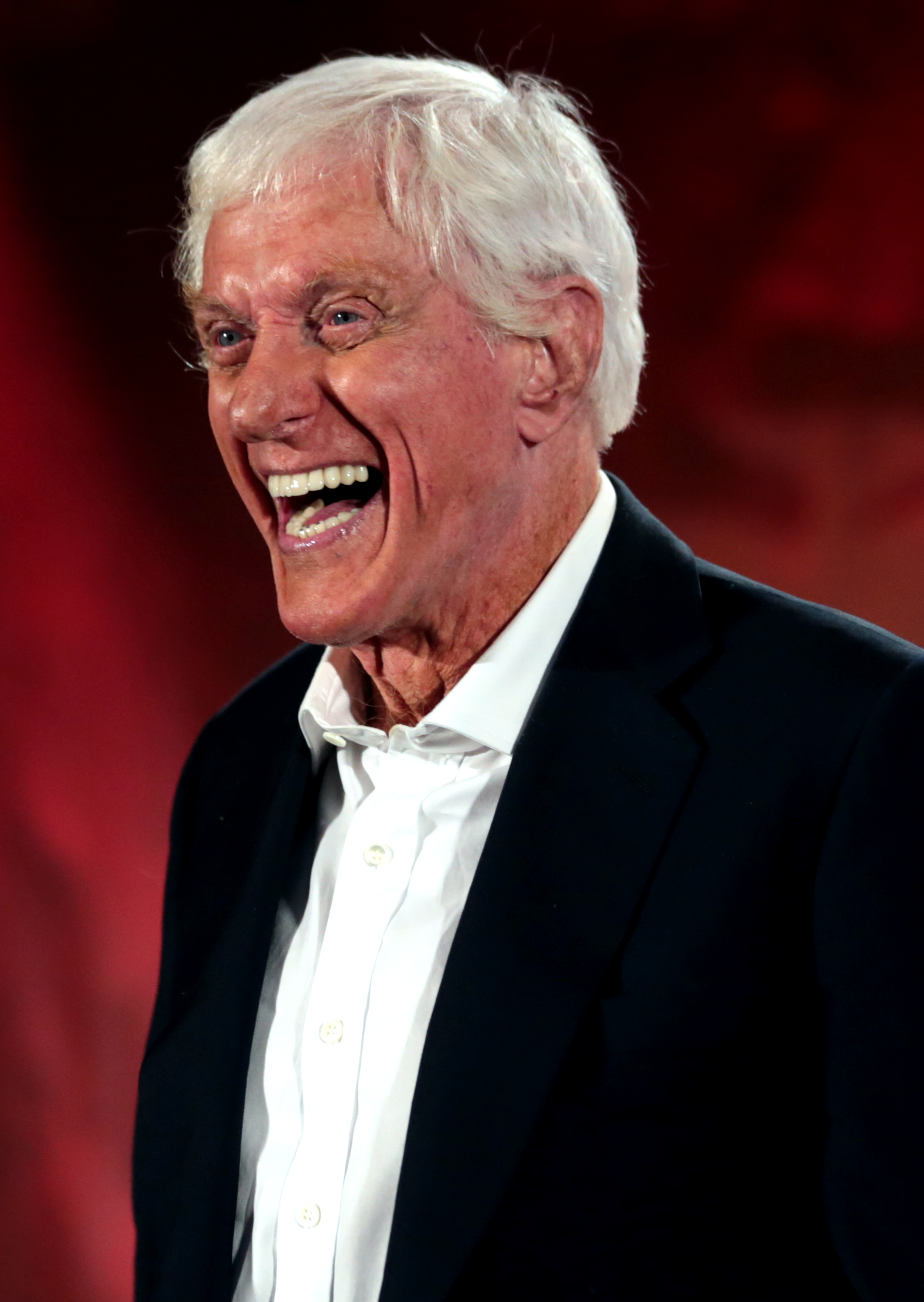
Dick Van Dyke

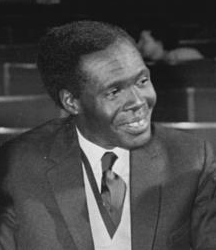
Milton Obote

- December 1 – Martin Rodbell, American scientist, recipient of the Nobel Prize in Physiology or Medicine (d. 1998)
- December 2 – Julie Harris, American actress (d. 2013)
- December 3 – Erik Mørk, Danish actor (d. 1993)
- December 4
  - Lino Lacedelli, Italian mountaineer (d. 2009)
  - Sauro Tomà, Italian footballer (d. 2018)
- December 5
  - Henri Oreiller, French Olympic alpine skier (d. 1962)
  - Anastasio Somoza Debayle, President of Nicaragua (d. 1980)
- December 6 – Shigeko Higashikuni, Japanese princess (d. 1961)
- December 7 – Hermano da Silva Ramos, French-Brazilian racing driver (d. 2026)
- December 8
  - Sammy Davis Jr., American singer, dancer, musician and actor (d. 1990)
  - Arnaldo Forlani, 43rd prime minister of Italy (d. 2023)
- December 11 – Paul Greengard, American neuroscientist, recipient of the Nobel Prize in Physiology or Medicine (d. 2019)
- December 12
  - Anne V. Coates, British film editor (d. 2018)
  - Vladimir Shainsky, Soviet and Russian composer (d. 2017)
- December 13 – Dick Van Dyke, American actor, singer and dancer
- December 15
  - Trần Thiện Khiêm, Vietnamese politician (d. 2021)
  - Hiroshi Motoyama, Japanese scientist (d. 2015)
- December 19
  - Rabah Bitat, Algerian politician, interim President of Algeria (d. 2000)
  - Tankred Dorst, German playwright (d. 2017)
  - Robert B. Sherman, American songwriter (d. 2012)
- December 20 – Béla Goldoványi, Hungarian athlete (d. 1972)
- December 22 – Ekaterina Mikhailova-Demina, military doctor and war heroine (d. 2019)
- December 23 – Pierre Bérégovoy, French politician, 111th Prime Minister of France (d. 1993)
- December 24 – Prosper Grech, Maltese cardinal (d. 2019)
- December 27
  - Moshe Arens, Israeli diplomat and politician (d. 2019)
  - Michel Piccoli, French actor, singer, director and producer (d. 2020)
- December 28
  - Willy Kemp, Luxembourgish road cycling racer (d. 2021)
  - Hildegard Knef, German actress, singer and writer (d. 2002)
  - Milton Obote, President of Uganda (d. 2005)
- December 29
  - Keshav Dutt, Indian field hockey player (d. 2021)
  - Luis Alberto Monge, 39th President of Costa Rica (d. 2016)

== Deaths ==
=== January ===
- January 5 – Yevgenia Bosch, Ukrainian politician (b. 1879)
- January 6 – Rafaela Porras Ayllón, Spanish Roman Catholic religious professed and saint (b. 1850)
- January 8 – George Bellows, American artist (b. 1882)
- January 14 – Camille Decoppet, Swiss Federal Councilor (b. 1862)
- January 16 – Aleksey Kuropatkin, Russian general and Imperial Russian Minister of War (b. 1848)
- January 18
  - Charles Lanrezac, French general (b. 1852)
  - J. M. E. McTaggart, English philosopher (b. 1866)
- January 22 – Fanny Bullock Workman, American geographer, writer and mountain climber (b. 1859)
- January 26 – Sir James Mackenzie, Scottish cardiologist (b. 1853)

=== February ===
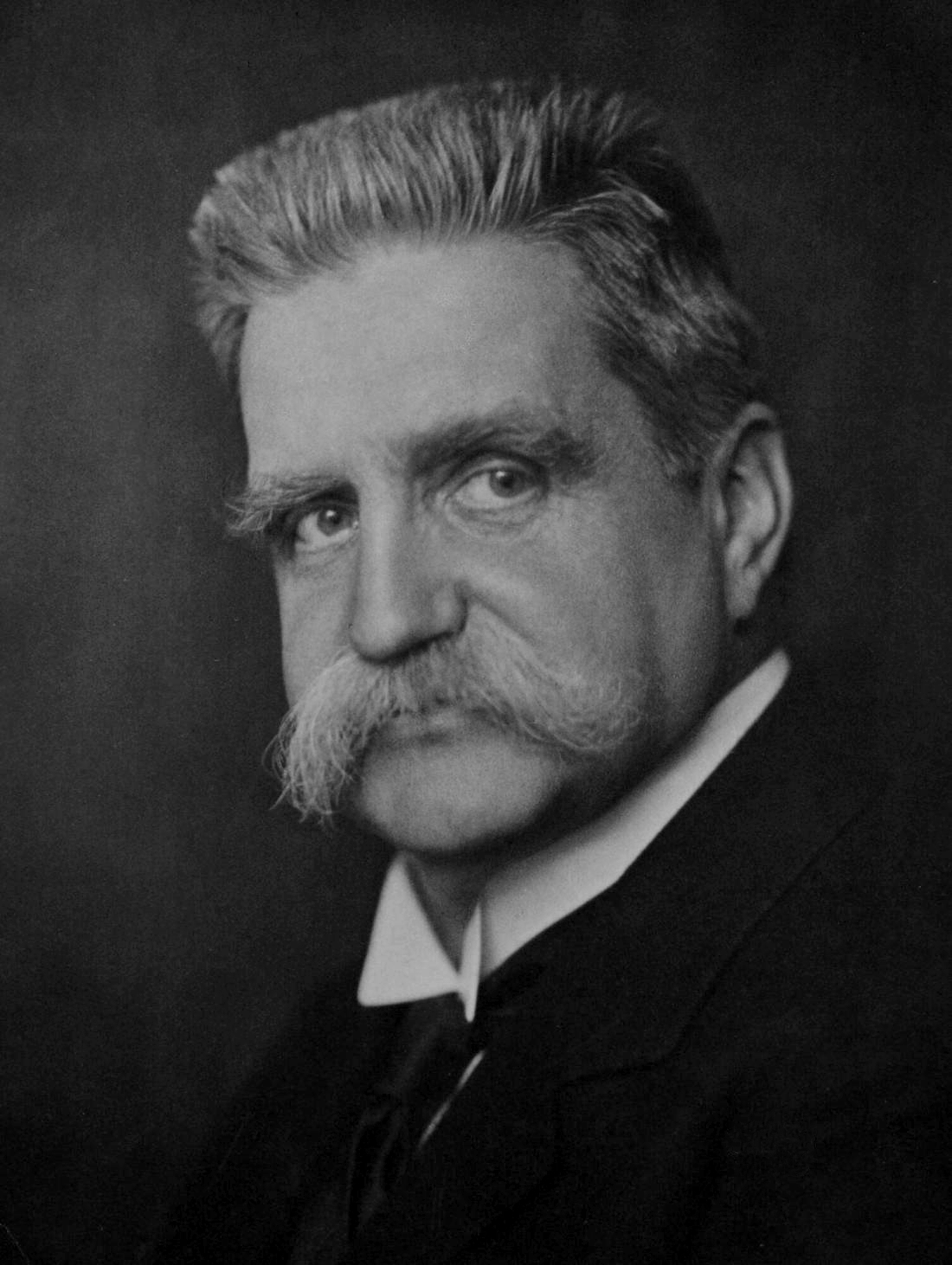
Hjalmar Branting

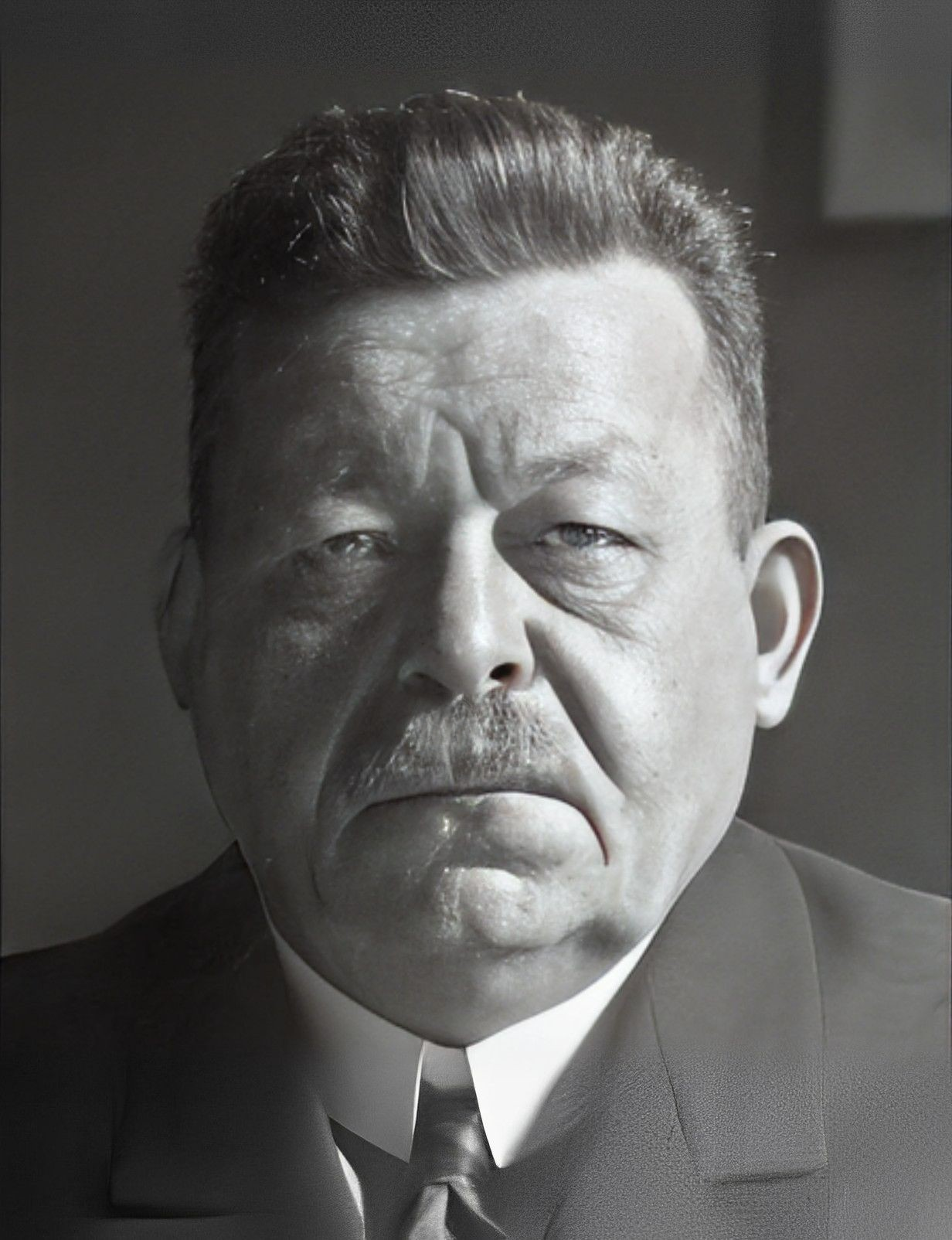
Friedrich Ebert

- February 2 – Jaap Eden, Dutch speed skater (b. 1873)
- February 3 – Oliver Heaviside, British mathematician (b. 1850)
- February 4 – Robert Koldewey, German architect and archaeologist (b. 1855)
- February 11 – Aristide Bruant, French singer and nightclub owner (b. 1851)
- February 13 – Floyd Collins, American cave explorer (b. 1887)
- February 17 – Ignacio Andrade, Venezuela military and politician, 23rd President of Venezuela (b. 1839)
- February 18 – James Lane Allen, American writer (b. 1849)
- February 21 – Fernando De Lucia, Italian tenor (b. 1860)
- February 23
  - Samuel Berger, American Olympic boxer (b. 1884)
  - James H. Wilson, American Union Army major general (b. 1837)
- February 24
  - Hjalmar Branting, 19th Prime Minister of Sweden, recipient of the Nobel Peace Prize (b. 1860)
  - John Palm, Curaçao-born composer (b. 1885)
- February 25 – Louis Feuillade, French silent film director (b. 1873)
- February 28 – Friedrich Ebert, 1st President of Germany (1919–1945) (b. 1871)

=== March ===
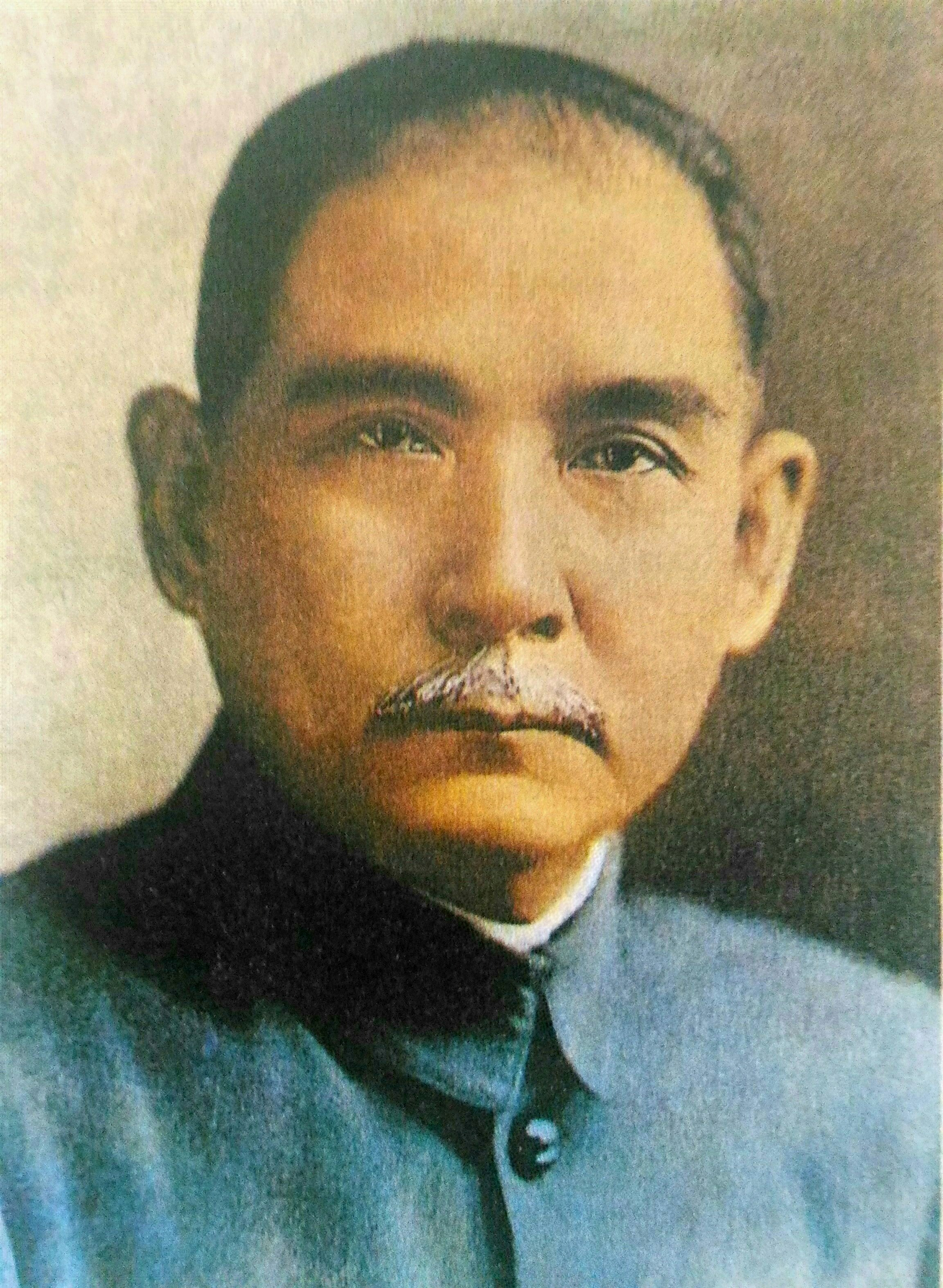
Sun Yat-sen

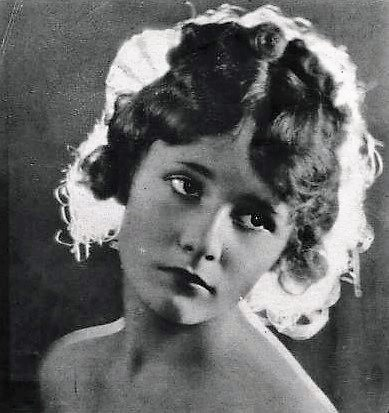
Lucille Ricksen

- March 1 – Homer Plessy, American political activist (b. 1862 or 1863)
- March 2
  - William A. Clark, American entrepreneur and politician (b. 1839)
  - Luigj Gurakuqi, Albanian writer and politician (b. 1879)
- March 4
  - Moritz Moszkowski, Polish composer (b. 1854)
  - James Ward, British philosopher and psychologist (b. 1843)
  - John Montgomery Ward, American baseball player and MLB Hall of Famer (b. 1860)
- March 7 – Georgy Lvov, Prime Minister of Russia (b. 1861)
- March 8
  - Manuel Míguez González, Spanish Roman Catholic priest and blessed (b. 1831)
  - Juliette Wytsman, Belgian painter (b. 1866)
- March 10 – Myer Prinstein, Polish-American track athlete (b. 1878)
- March 12 – Sun Yat-sen, Chinese physician, politician and revolutionary (b. 1866)
- March 13 – Lucille Ricksen, American silent film actress (b. 1910)
- March 14 – Walter Camp, American football coach (b. 1859)
- March 19 – Nariman Narimanov, Azerbaijani politician (b. 1870)
- March 20 – George Curzon, 1st Marquess Curzon of Kedleston, Viceroy of India (b. 1859)
- March 28 – Henry Rawlinson, 1st Baron Rawlinson, British general (b. 1864)
- March 30 – Rudolf Steiner, Austrian philosopher (b. 1861)

=== April ===
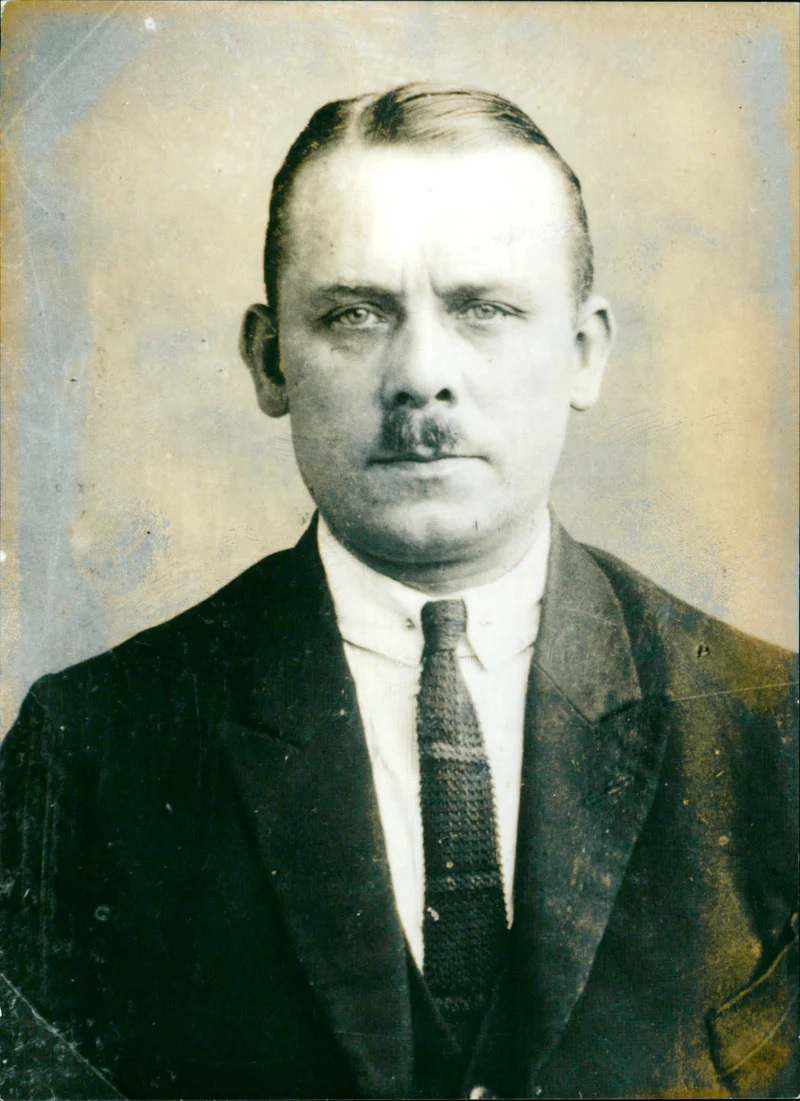
Fritz Haarmann

- April 7 – Patriarch Tikhon of Moscow, Patriarch of the Russian Orthodox Church (b. 1865)
- April 13
  - Elwood Haynes, American inventor (b. 1857)
  - August Endell, German architect (b. 1871)
- April 15
  - John Singer Sargent, American artist (b. 1856)
  - Fritz Haarmann, German serial killer (executed) (b. 1879)
- April 16 – Günther Victor, Prince of Schwarzburg, German prince (b. 1852)
- April 17 – Wong Fei-hung, Chinese healer and revolutionary (b. 1847)
- April 19 – John Walter Smith, American politician (b. 1845)
- April 20 – Herbert Lawford, British tennis player (b. 1851)
- April 22 – André Caplet, French composer and conductor (b. 1878)
- Unknown date – Mulai Ahmed er Raisuni, Moroccan sharif and tribal leader (b. 1871)

=== May ===
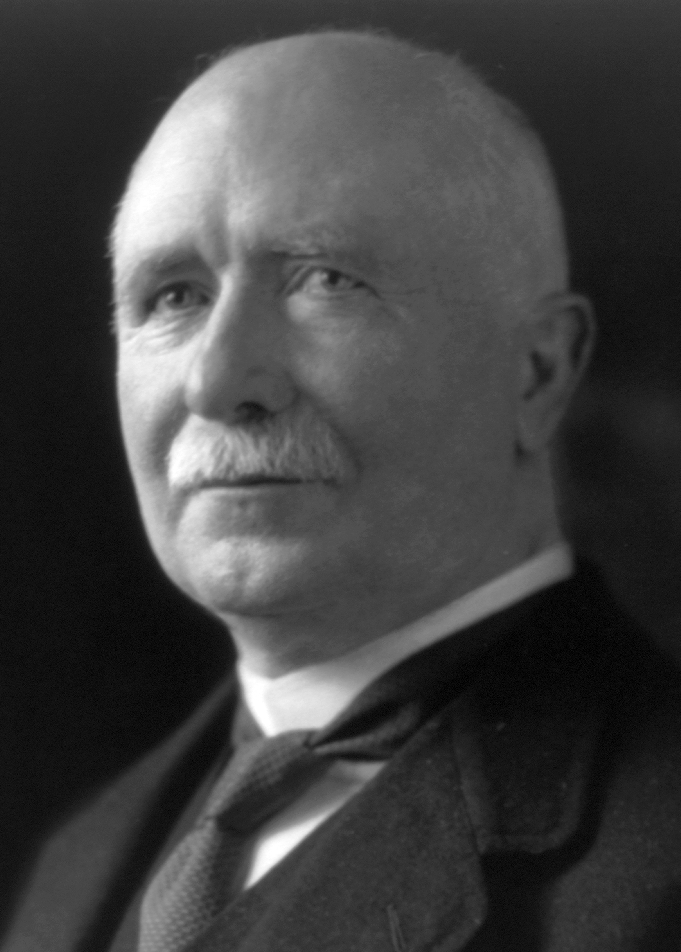
William Massey

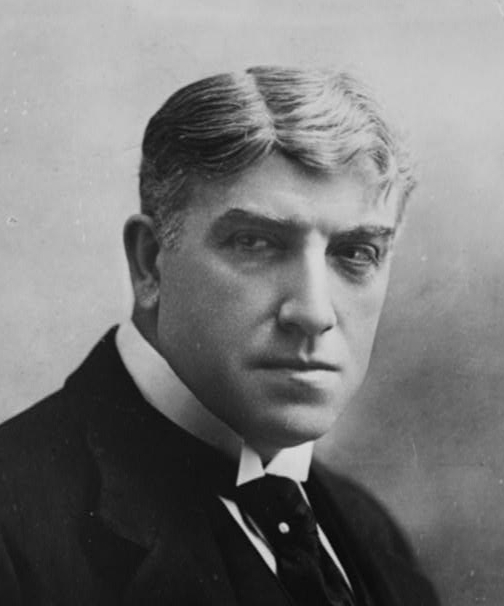
Lucien Guitry

- May 2
  - Johann Palisa, Austrian astronomer (b. 1848)
  - Antun Branko Šimić, Croatian poet (b. 1898)
- May 3 – Clément Ader, French Army captain and aviation pioneer (b. 1841)
- May 4 – Giovanni Battista Grassi, Italian physician and zoologist (b. 1854)
- May 5 – Catharine van Tussenbroek, Dutch physician (b. 1852)
- May 7
  - William Lever, 1st Viscount Leverhulme, British industrialist, philanthropist and politician (b. 1851)
  - Sir Doveton Sturdee, British admiral (b. 1859)
- May 10
  - Alexandru Marghiloman, 25th prime minister of Romania (b. 1854)
  - William Massey, 19th prime minister of New Zealand (b. 1856)
- May 12
  - Amy Lowell, American poet (b. 1874)
  - Charles Mangin, French general (b. 1866)
- May 13 – Alfred Milner, 1st Viscount Milner, British politician and colonial administrator (b. 1854)
- May 14 – H. Rider Haggard, British writer (b. 1856)
- May 15 – Nelson A. Miles, American general (b. 1839)
- May 20
  - Ramón Auñón y Villalón, Spanish admiral and politician (b. 1844)
  - Elias M. Ammons, Governor of Colorado (b. 1860)
  - Joseph Howard, 1st Prime Minister of Malta (b. 1862)
- May 21 – Hidesaburō Ueno, Japanese agricultural scientist and guardian of Hachikō (b. 1871)
- May 22 – John French, 1st Earl of Ypres, British World War I field marshal (b. 1852)
- May 25 – Karl Abraham, German psychoanalyst (b. 1877)
- May 28 – João Pinheiro Chagas, Prime Minister of Portugal (b. 1863)
- May 29 – Percy Fawcett, British explorer, anthropologist and archaeologist (disappeared) (b. 1867)

=== June ===
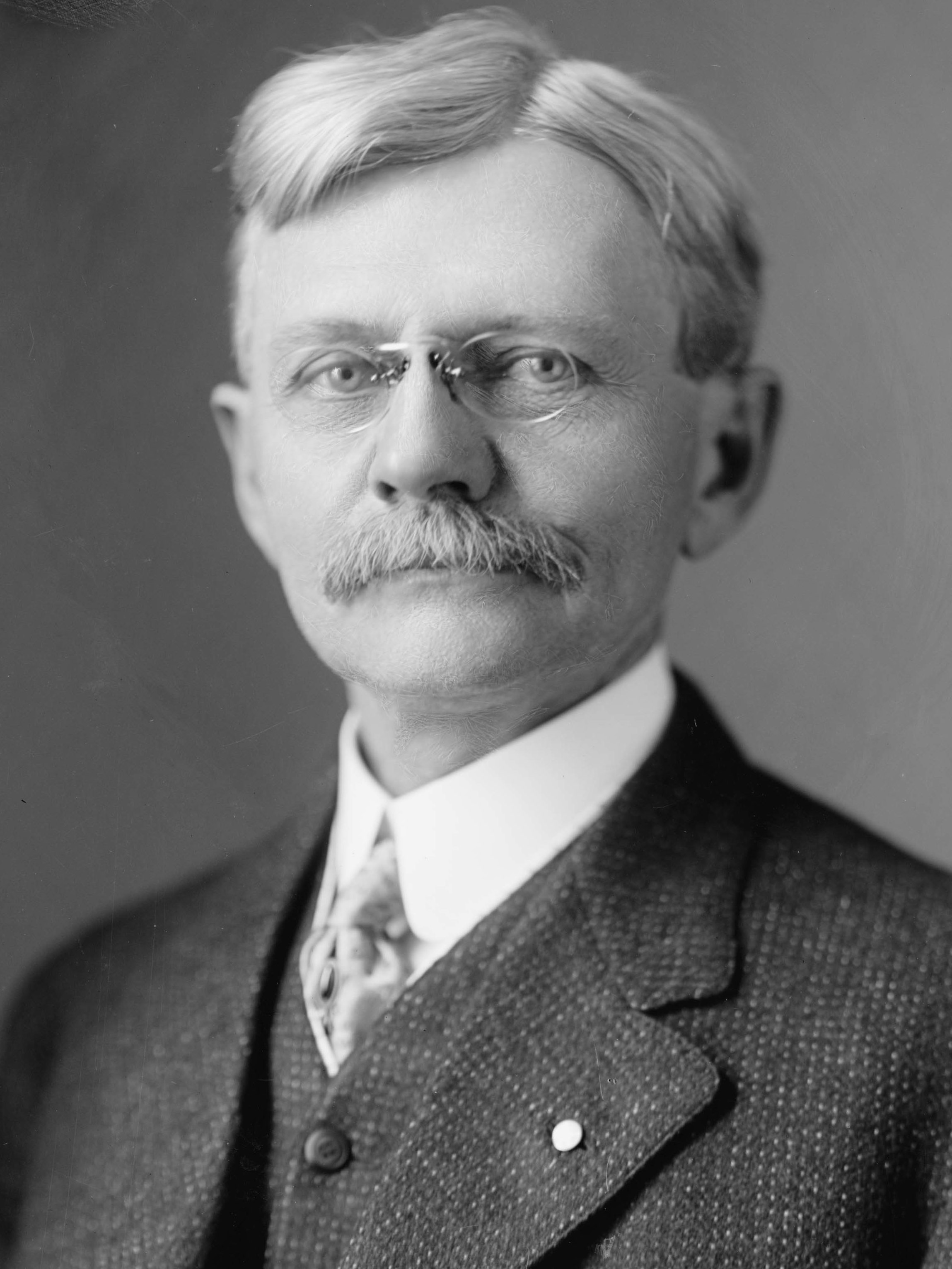
Thomas R. Marshall

- June 1
  - Lucien Guitry, French actor (b. 1860)
  - Thomas R. Marshall, 28th Vice President of the United States (b. 1854)
- June 2 – James Ellsworth, American mine owner and banker (b. 1849)
- June 3 – Camille Flammarion, French astronomer (b. 1842)
- June 9 – Antony MacDonnell, 1st Baron MacDonnell, Irish civil servant (b. 1844)
- June 12 – Mary Cole Walling, American patriot, lecturer (b. 1838)
- June 17 – Adolf Pilar von Pilchau, Baltic German politician, regent of the United Baltic Duchy and baron (b. 1851)
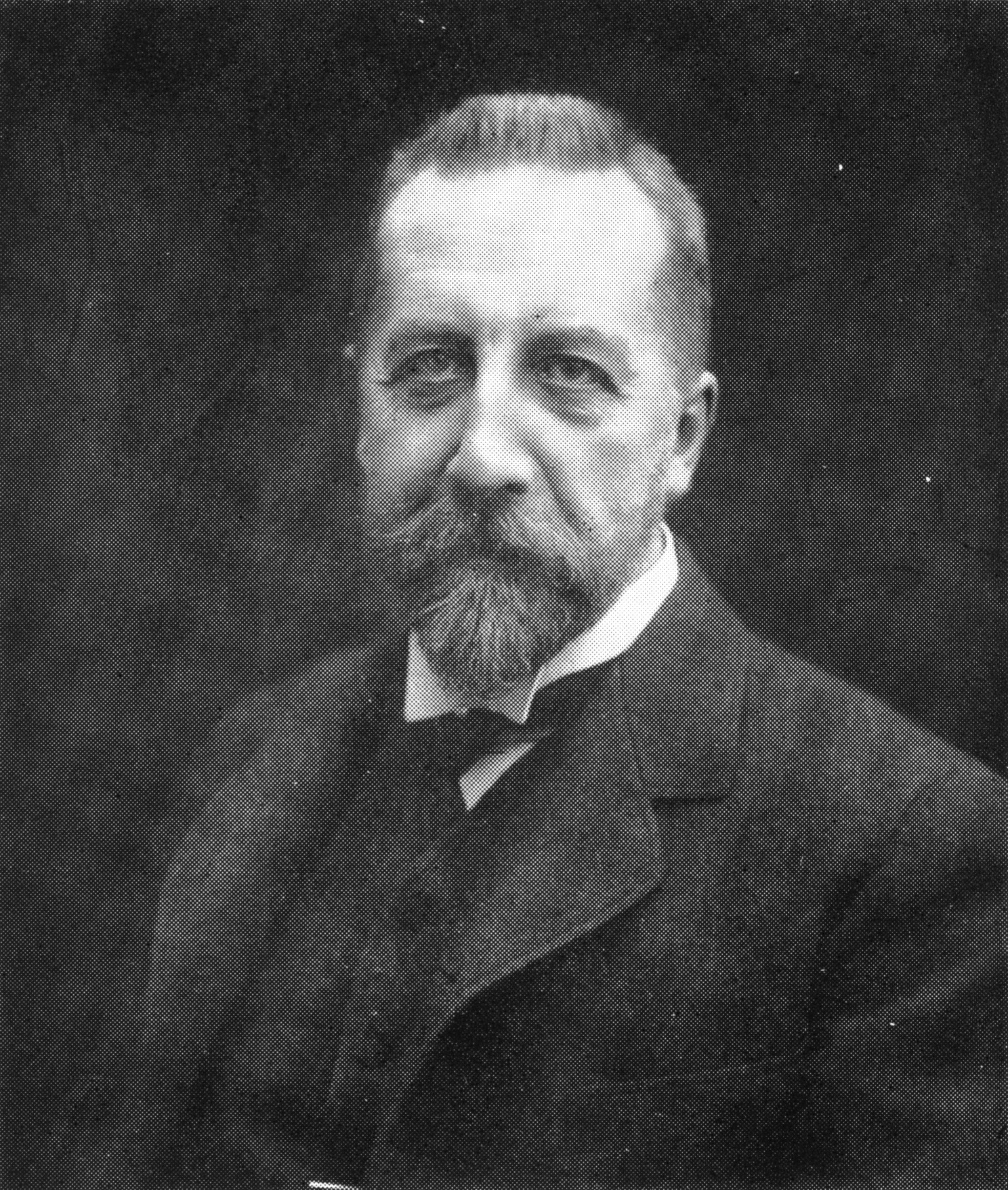
  Christian Michelsen
- June 18 – Robert M. La Follette, American politician (b. 1855)
- June 20 – Josef Breuer, Austrian neurologist (b. 1842)
- June 22 – Felix Klein, German mathematician (b. 1849)
- June 28 – Georgina Febres-Cordero, Venezuelan nun (b. 1861)
- June 29 – Christian Michelsen, Norwegian politician and 1st Prime Minister of Norway (b. 1857)

=== July ===
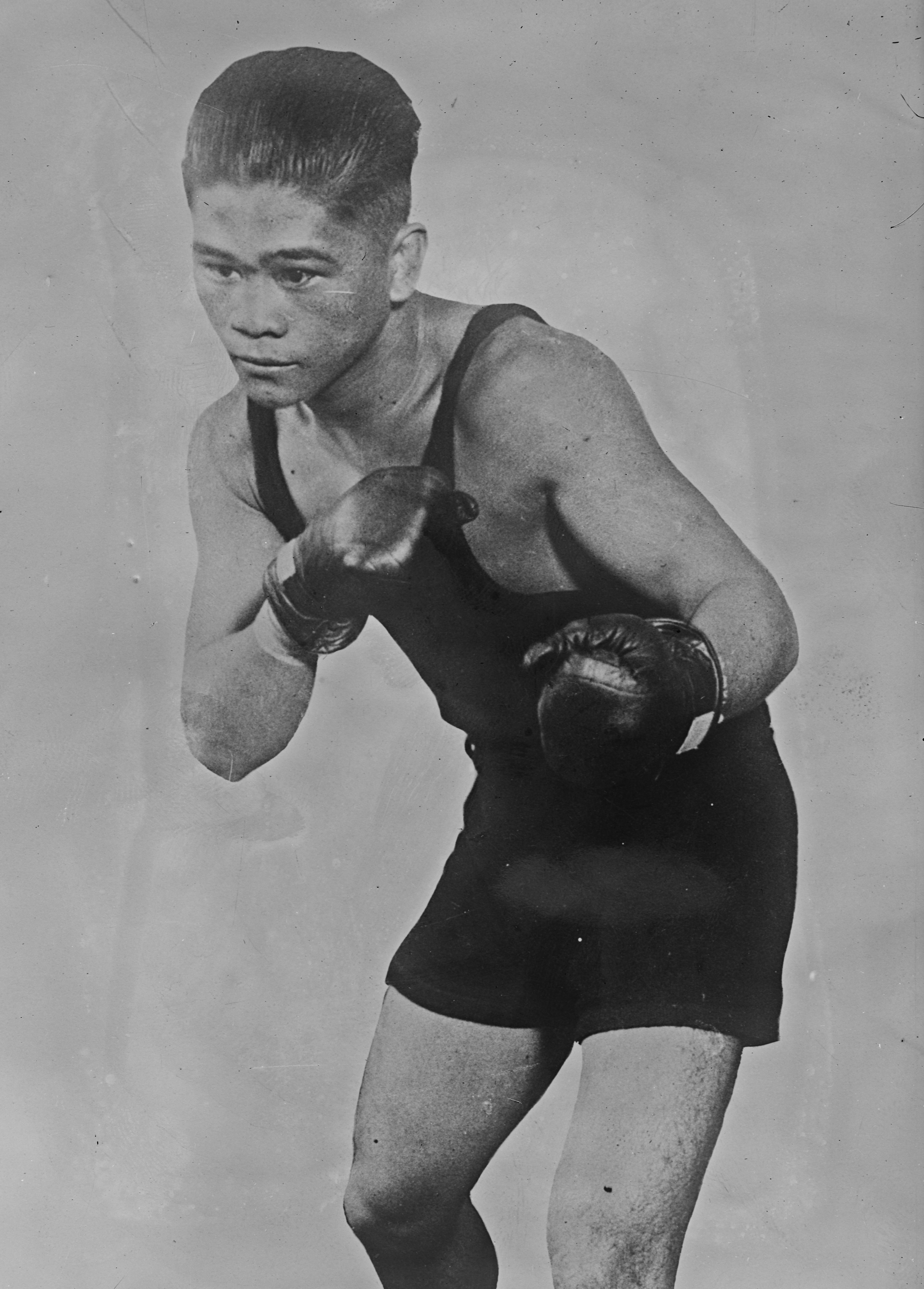
Pancho Villa

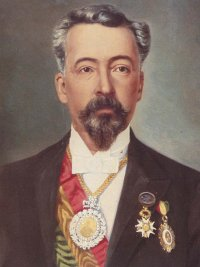
Severo Fernández

- July 1 – Erik Satie, French composer (b. 1866)
- July 2 – Nikolai Golitsyn, last Prime Minister of the Russian Empire (executed) (b. 1850)
- July 4 – Pier Giorgio Frassati, Italian Roman Catholic social activist and blessed (b. 1901)
- July 8 – Clarence Hudson White, American photographer (b. 1871)
- July 14 – Pancho Villa, Filipino world boxing champion (b. 1901)
- July 17 – Lovis Corinth, German painter (b. 1858)
- July 19 – Francisco José Fernandes Costa, Portuguese lawyer and politician (b. 1867)
- July 26
  - Antonio Ascari, Italian racing driver (b. 1888)
  - William Jennings Bryan, American lawyer and politician (b. 1860)
  - Gottlob Frege, German mathematician and philosopher (b. 1848)

=== August ===
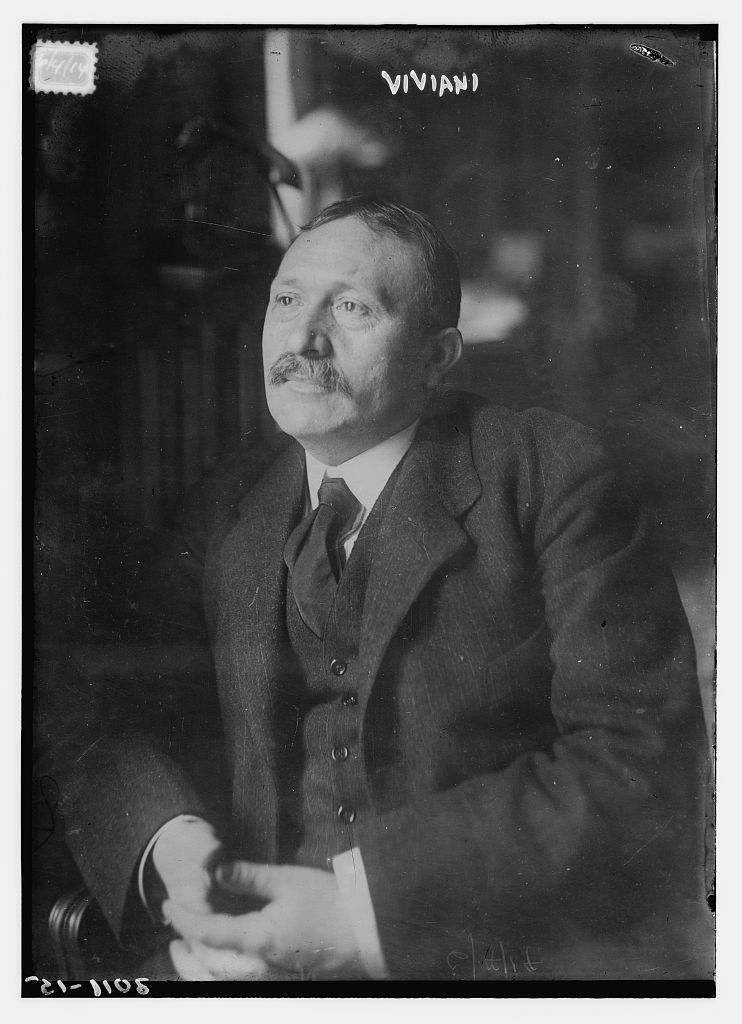
René Viviani

- August 4 – Charles W. Clark, American baritone (b. 1865)
- August 5 – Jennie Lee, American actress (b. 1848)
- August 6 – Gregorio Ricci-Curbastro, Italian mathematician (b. 1853)
- August 12 – Severo Fernández, 24th President of Bolivia (b. 1849)
- August 15 – Konrad Mägi, Estonian landscape painter (b. 1878)
- August 17 – Ioan Slavici, Romanian writer (b. 1848)
- August 20 – Liao Zhongkai, Chinese politician, Kuomintang leader and financier (b. 1877)
- August 25 – Franz Conrad von Hötzendorf, Austrian field marshal (b. 1852)

=== September ===
- September 6 or September 8 – Louisa Briggs, Aboriginal Australian rights activist (b. 1818 or 1836)
- September 7 – René Viviani, 81st Prime Minister of France (b. 1863)
- September 16 – Alexander Friedmann, Russian mathematician (b. 1888)
- September 17 – Carl Eytel, German-American artist working in Palm Springs, California (b. 1862)
- September 18 – Yui Mitsue, Japanese general (b. 1860)
- September 29 – Léon Bourgeois, French statesman, recipient of the Nobel Peace Prize (b. 1851)

=== October ===
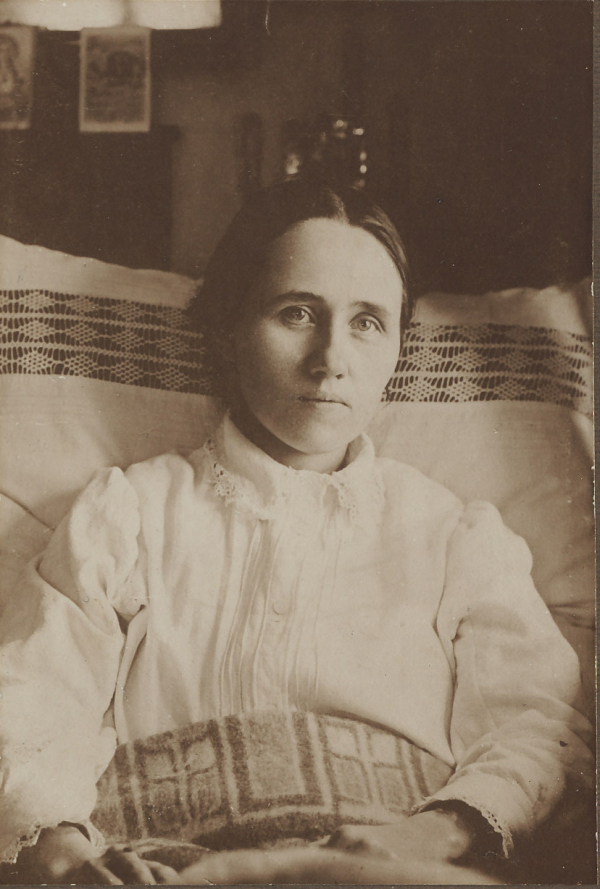
St Anna Schäffer

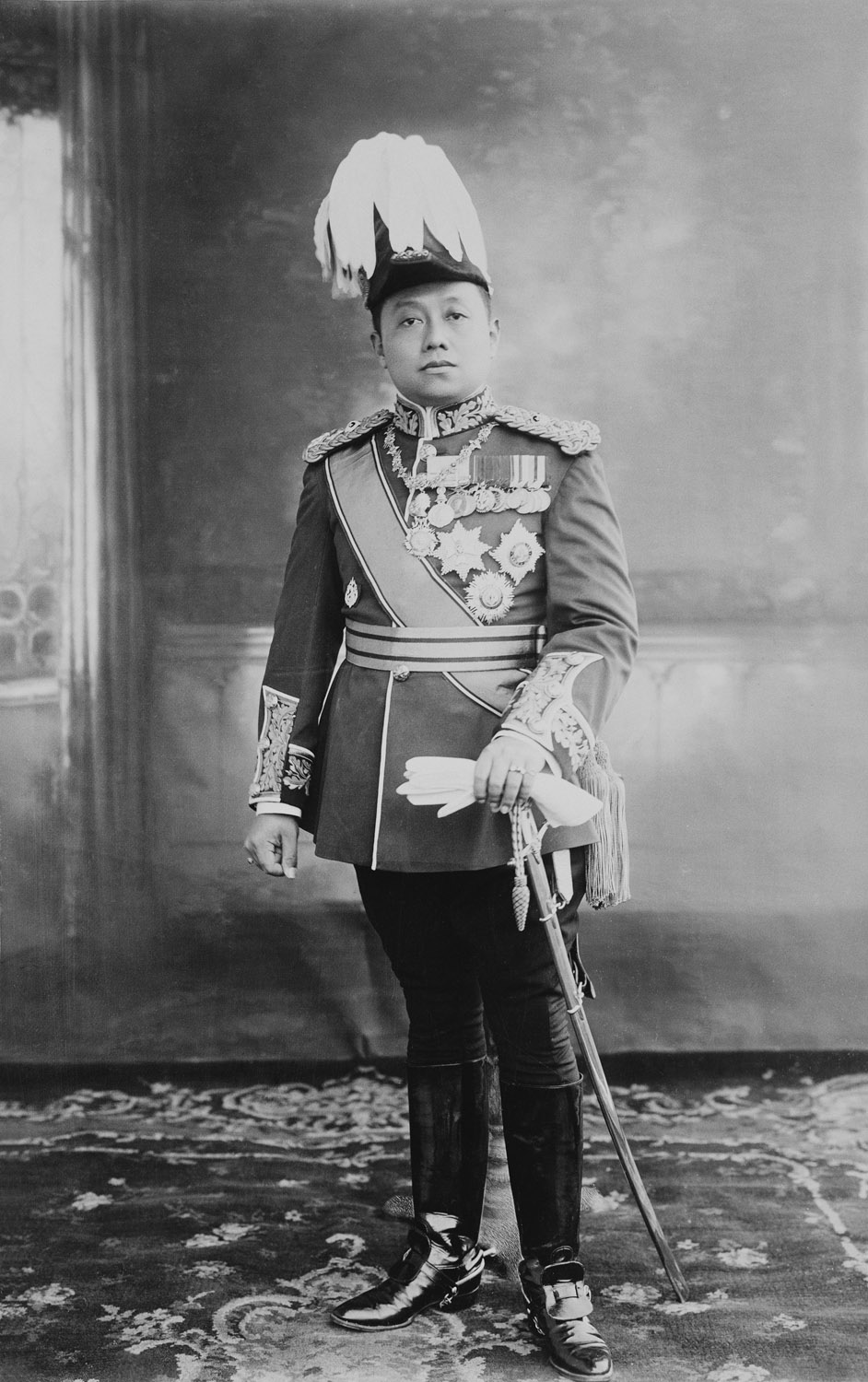
Vajiravudh

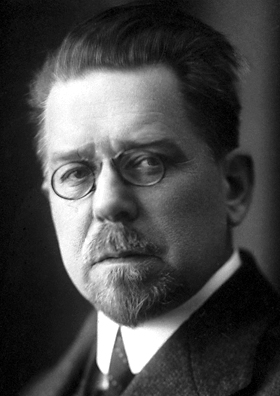
Władysław Reymont

- October 5 – Anna Schäffer, German Roman Catholic mystic, stigmatist and saint (b. 1882)
- October 7 – Christy Mathewson, American baseball player and MLB Hall of Famer (b. 1880)
- October 10 – James Buchanan Duke, American tobacco and electric power industrialist (b. 1856)
- October 14 – Eugen Sandow, German-born bodybuilder, physical culturist (b. 1867)
- October 15 – Dolores Jiménez y Muro, Mexican revolutionary and educator (b. 1848)
- October 20 – Jonah of Hankou, Russian Orthodox priest and saint (b. 1888)
- October 31
  - George Anderson, Danish criminal (b. 1880)
  - Mikhail Frunze, Russian Bolshevik leader (b. 1885)
  - José Ingenieros, Argentine physician, sociologist and philosopher (b. 1877)
  - Thomas Henry Tracy, Canadian architect and alderman (b. 1848)

=== November ===
- November 1
  - Lester Cuneo, American actor (b. 1888)
  - Max Linder, French actor (b. 1883)
- November 5 – Sidney Reilly, Russian spy (executed) (b. c.1873)
- November 6 – Khải Định, Emperor of Vietnam (b. 1885)
- November 12 – Robert Wrenn, American tennis player (b. 1873)
- November 20
  - Queen Alexandra of the United Kingdom, consort of King Edward VII (b. 1844)
  - Clara Morris, American stage actress (b. 1846)
- November 24 – Margaret Sinclair, British nun and venerable (b. 1900)
- November 26 – King Vajiravudh (Rama VI) of Siam (b. 1880)

=== December ===
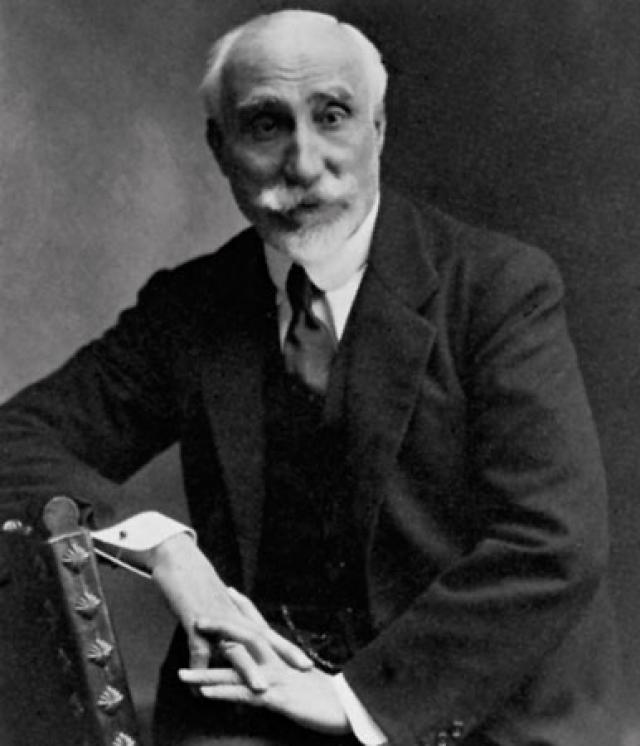
Antonio Maura

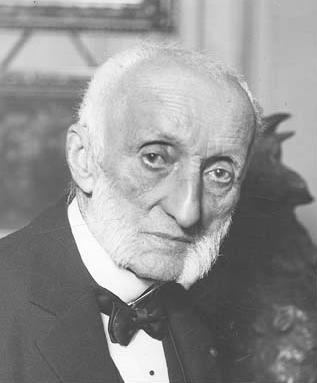
Jules Méline

- December 5
  - Wilhelmina Drucker, Dutch politician and writer (b. 1847)
  - Władysław Reymont, Polish writer, Nobel Prize laureate (b. 1867)
- December 8 – Marguerite Marsh, American actress (b. 1888)
- December 9 – Pablo Iglesias Posse, co-founder of the Spanish Socialist Workers Party (b. 1850)
- December 13 – Antonio Maura, Spanish conservative politician, 5-time Prime Minister of Spain (b. 1853)
- December 15 – Battling Siki, Senegalese boxer (b. 1897)
- December 18 – Sir Hamo Thornycroft, British sculptor (b. 1850)
- December 19 – José Ignacio Quintón, Puerto Rican composer and pianist (b. 1881)
- December 20 – Prior João Ferreira Sardo, the founder of the Gafanha da Nazaré died of a long-term lung disease.
- December 21
  - Lottie Lyell, Australian female pioneer film director and producer (b. 1890)
  - Jules Méline, French statesman, 50th Prime Minister of France (b. 1838)
- December 22
  - Alice, Princess Dowager of Monaco, consort of Albert I of Monaco (b. 1858)
  - Mary Thurman, American actress (b. 1895)
- December 25
  - Karl Abraham, German psychoanalyst (b. 1877)
  - Ester Rachel Kamińska, Polish actress, "mother of Yiddish theatre" (b. 1870)
- December 27 – Marie-Louise Jaÿ, French businesswoman (b. 1838)
- December 28
  - Sergei Yesenin, Russian lyrical poet (b. 1895)
  - Raymond P. Rodgers, American admiral (b. 1849)
- December 29 – Félix Vallotton, Swiss painter (b. 1865)
- December 31 – J. Gordon Edwards, Canadian film director (b. 1867)

== Nobel Prizes ==

- Physics – James Franck and Gustav Ludwig Hertz
- Chemistry – Richard Adolf Zsigmondy
- Physiology or Medicine – not awarded
- Literature – George Bernard Shaw
- Peace – Austen Chamberlain and Charles Gates Dawes
