= List of Pakistani Americans =

The following is a list of notable Pakistani Americans, including both original immigrants who obtained American citizenship and their American descendants.

To be included in this list, the person must have a Wikipedia article showing they are Pakistani American or must have references showing they are Pakistani American and are notable.

== Academia, science and technology ==
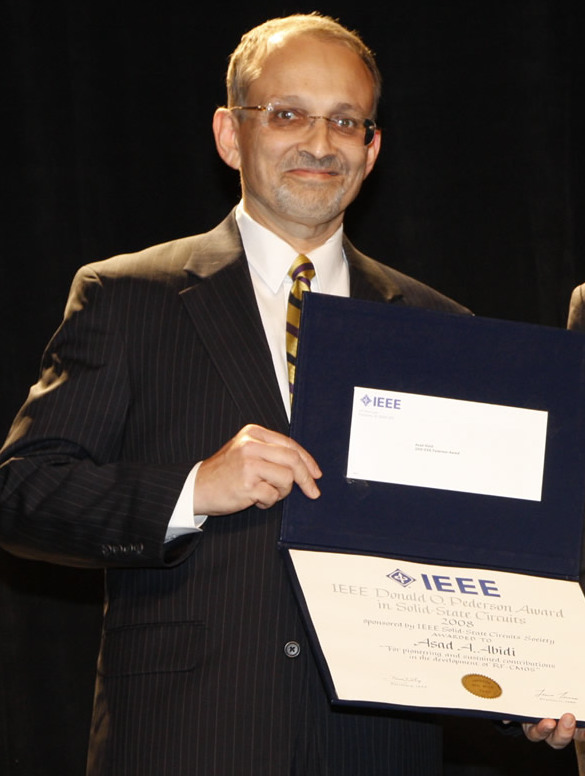
Professor Asad Abidi receiving the IEEE Pederson Award at ISSCC 2008

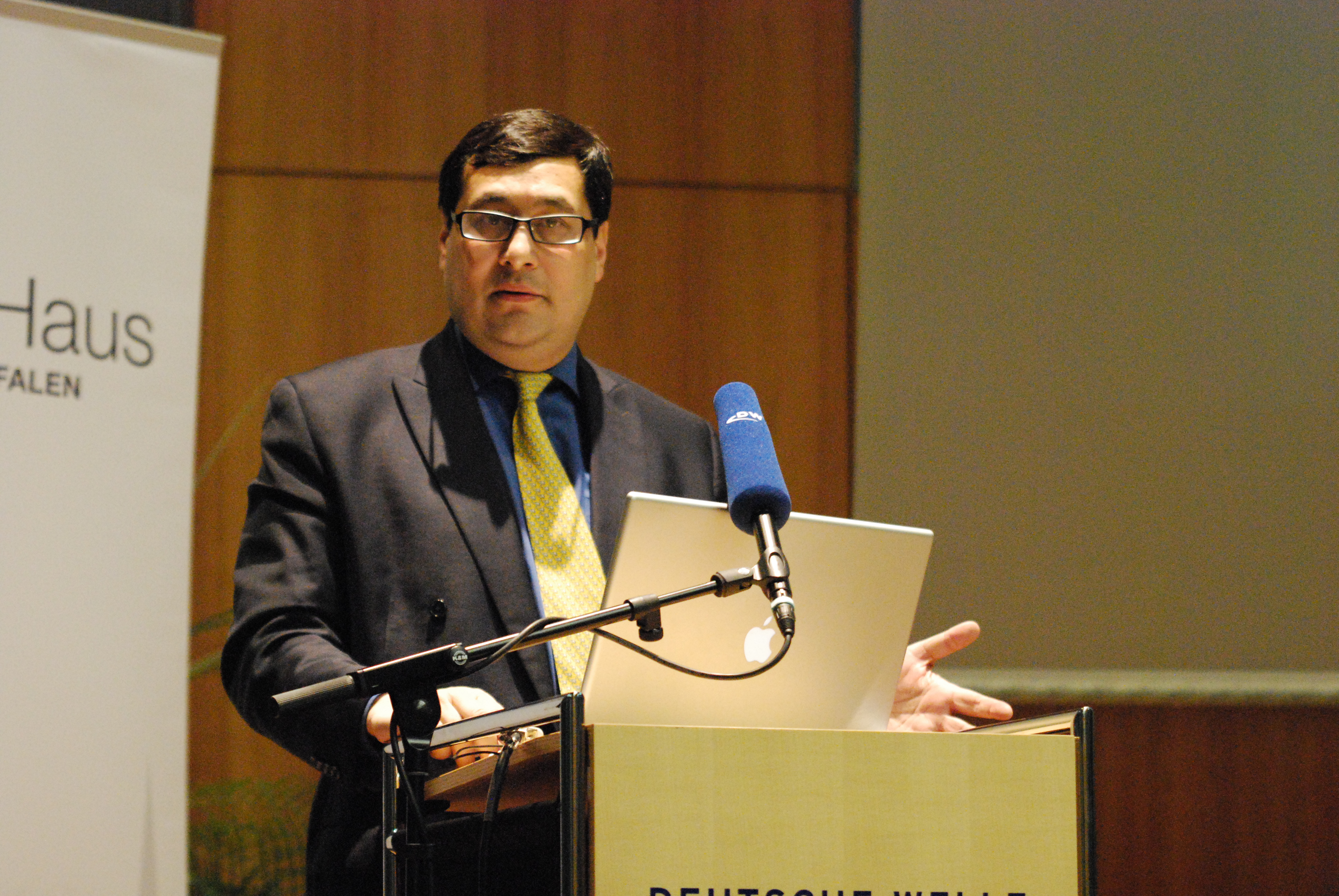
Professor Adil Najam during a talk at Deutsche Welle Building in Bonn, Germany on 21 January 2010

- Abdul J. Tajik – researcher in clinical medicine
- Adil Haider – trauma surgeon and former Kessler Director for the Center for Surgery and Public Health, a joint initiative of the Brigham and Women's Hospital and Harvard Medical School
- Adil Najam – professor of earth, environment and international relations and dean of the Frederick S. Pardee School of Global Studies at Boston University; founding editor of blog Pakistaniat
- Ahsan Kareem – Robert M Moran Professor of Engineering at the University of Notre Dame; director of the NatHaz Modeling Laboratory; member of the US, Chinese, Japanese and Indian Academies of Engineering
- Akbar S. Ahmed – U.S. resident Pakistani anthropologist; the Ibn Khaldun Chair of Islamic Studies at American University; producer of the film Journey Into Europe, on Islam in Europe
- Ali S. Khan – surgeon and former director of the Office of Public Health Preparedness and Response (PHPR) at the Centers for Disease Control and Prevention
- Anwar Shaikh – professor of economics at the graduate faculty of The New School in New York City
- Asad Abidi – professor of electrical engineering at the University of California, Los Angeles; member of the National Academy of Engineering
- Ashar Aziz – electrical engineer, business executive and founder of FireEye
- Azra Raza – Chan Soon-Shiong Professor of Medicine and director of Myelodysplastic Syndrome (MDS) Center at Columbia University.
- Atif Mian – professor of economics at Princeton University
- Ayesha Jalal – MacArthur Fellow and Richardson Professor of History at Tufts University
- Asim Khwaja — professor at Harvard Kennedy School
- Ayub K. Ommaya – neurosurgeon and expert in traumatic brain injuries, clinical researcher at the National Institutes of Health; invented the Ommaya reservoir, which is used to provide chemotherapy directly to brain tumors
- Azra Raza – Chan Soon-Shiong Professor of Medicine and director of Myelodysplastic Syndrome (MDS) Center at Columbia University.
- Farooq Azam – distinguished professor at Scripps Institution of Oceanography, University of California, San Diego; researcher in the field of marine microbiology
- Gul Agha – professor of computer science at the University of Illinois at Urbana-Champaign
- Hafeez Malik – professor of political science at Villanova University, in Pennsylvania
- Hamid Nawab – professor of electrical and computer engineering and biomedical engineering, Boston University; co-author of widely used textbook Signals and Systems (1997), published by Prentice Hall (Pearson); researcher in signal processing and machine perception with application to auditory, speech, and neuromuscular systems
- Irfan Siddiqi – professor of physics at the University of California, Berkeley, and also vice chair of the university's department of physics
- Mark S. Humayun – professor of ophthalmology at Keck School of Medicine, University of Southern California, holder of the Cornelius J. Pings Chair in Biomedical Sciences, and director of USC Eye Institute and Institute For Biomedical Therapeutics
- Muhammed S. Zubairy – professor in the department of physics and astronomy and holder of the Munnerlyn-Heep Chair in Quantum Optics at the Texas A&M University
- Mujaddid A. Ijaz – physicist known for his work at Oak Ridge National Laboratory, professor of physics at Virginia Tech
- Nergis Mavalvala – Kathleen Marble Professor of Astrophysics at the Massachusetts Institute of Technology (MIT), and 2010 MacArthur Fellow; part of the team that made the first direct gravitational wave observation. Dean of MIT's School of Science.
- Saleem H. Ali – environmental researcher and associate dean for graduate studies at the University of Vermont's Rubenstein School of Environment and Natural Resources; writer and contributor to publications such as the International Herald Tribune
- Rayid Ghani – senior fellow and director of the Center for Data Science and Public Policy at the Computation Institute (a joint initiative of the University of Chicago and the Argonne National Laboratory), as well as the research director of the institute. Also a senior fellow at the Harris School of Public Policy of the University of Chicago.
- Sara Suleri – professor of English at Yale University
- Shahab Ahmed – Scholar of Islam at Harvard University
- Syra Madad – pathogen preparedness expert and infectious disease epidemiologist
- Talal Asad – professor of anthropology and religious studies at CUNY
- Wasiullah Khan – founder and chancellor of East-West University
- Zaheer Ahmad – doctor in internal medicine; founder of the Shifa International Hospital
- Zia Mian – physicist and co-director of the Program on Science and Global Security at Princeton University
- Amir Hussain – Scholar of Islam at Loyola Marymount University

== Business and finance ==
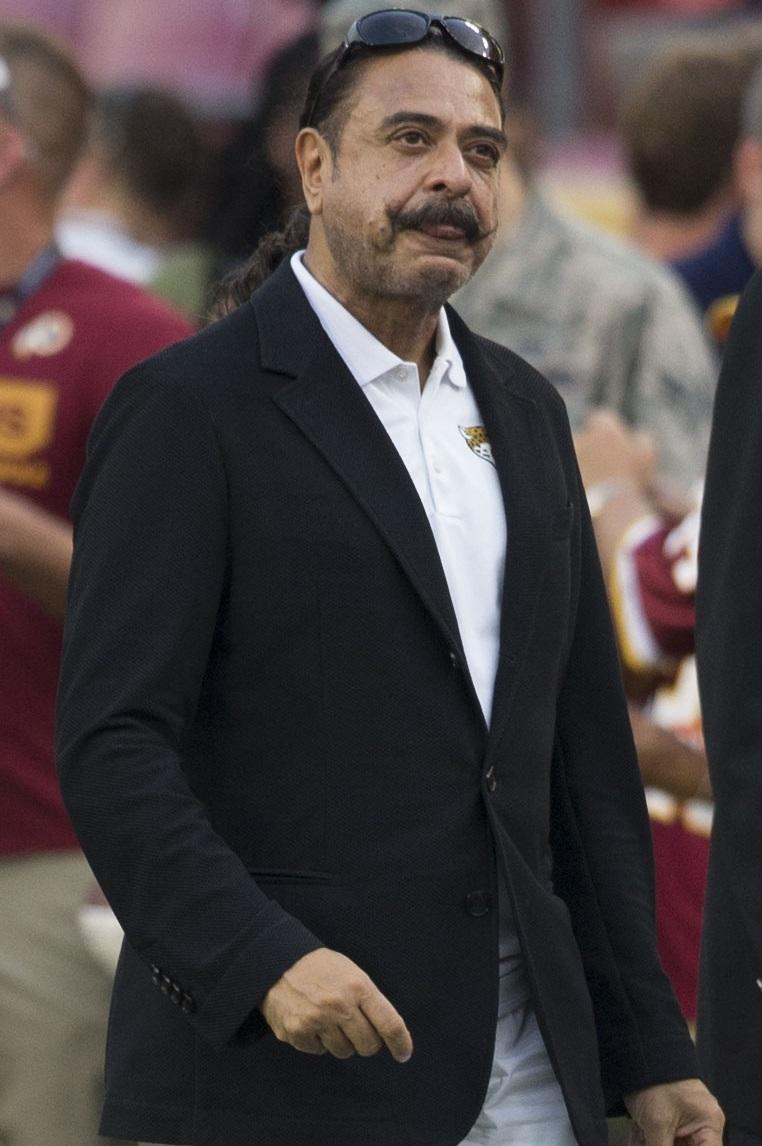
Shahid Khan at a 2015 Jacksonville Jaguars vs Washington Redskins match

- Farooq Kathwari – chairman, president and chief executive officer of Ethan Allen
- Fred Hassan – chairman of the board and chief executive officer of pharmaceutical company Schering-Plough from 2003 to 2009, when the company completed its merger with Merck & Co
- Ghulam Bombaywala – owner and operator of multiple restaurants
- Javed Ahmed – currently lives in London, where his headquarters are; former chief executive officer of Tate & Lyle, a FTSE 250 company which is one of Britain's oldest brands
- Mansoor Ijaz – businessman; founder and chairman of Crescent Investment Management LLC, a New York investment partnership; commentator on Fox News
- Michael Chowdry – businessman; founder of air cargo company Atlas Air, which in 2001 was worth over $1.39 billion
- Nabeel Gareeb – appointed president and chief executive officer and a member of the board of directors of MEMC in 2002; according to CNN he was the 24th highest paid CEO in 2006; according to Forbes he was the 6th highest earning CEO in 2008 in the US
- Ramesh Balwani – businessman; former president and COO of Theranos
- Safi Qureshey – former CEO and co-founder of AST Research, a Fortune 500 company with revenues over US$2.5 billion
- Shahid Khan – president of Flex-N-Gate Corp., with $2 billion in annual revenue; in mid-December 2011 bought a majority stake of NFL team Jacksonville Jaguars for $760 million
- Sohaib Abbasi – former chairman and CEO of Informatica
- Tariq Farid – entrepreneur; owner and CEO of Edible Arrangements
- Zia Chishti – founder, CEO and chairman of the board of directors of Afiniti.
- Osman Rashid – co-founder of Chegg

== Media, art and entertainment ==
There are Urdu radio stations in areas with high Pakistani populations. Several cable and satellite providers offer Pakistani channels, including GEO TV, ARY Digital, and PTV. Others have offered Pakistani content for subscription, such as when Pakistan played Australia for the Cricket World Cup in 1999. In July 2005, Viacom's music video network MTV launched a digital, spin-off network called MTV Desi which targets South Asian Americans in the US, including Pakistanis. MTV Desi closed operations as part of the shutdown of MTV World in April 2007.

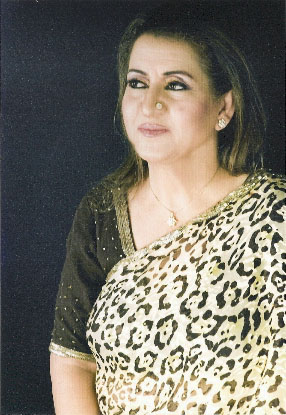
Munni Begum, ghazal singer

- Adam Amin – sports announcer for ESPN
- Bassam Tariq – film director
- Fahad Azam – rapper going by the stage name of Mr. Capone-E
- Fahad Rehmani – actor, television director and drama producer
- Fareed Haque – guitarist of Pakistani and Chilean descent
- Hena Doba – TV anchor and news anchor for CBS, known for "The National Desk with Hena Doba"
- Aishah Hasnie – television reporter and news anchor for Fox News
- Amna Nawaz – journalist and a co-anchor of the PBS NewsHour
- Christel Khalil – of mixed Pakistani and African American descent
- Aamina Sheikh – actress and model
- Faran Tahir – actor; born in the U.S. but raised in Pakistan
- Dilshad Vadsaria – Pakistani American of Indian and Portuguese descent; television actress, Greek
- Gregory J. Qaiyum – stage name GQ, American actor of German, English and Pakistani descent
- Iqbal Theba – starred in numerous American sitcoms but most famous for playing Principal Figgins on the show Glee
- Jahan Yousaf – part of EDM duo Krewella
- Jeffery A. Qaiyum – stage name JAQ; American professional b-boy of German, English and Pakistani descent
- Kamran Rashid Khan – stage name Lazarus, physician and rapper from Detroit

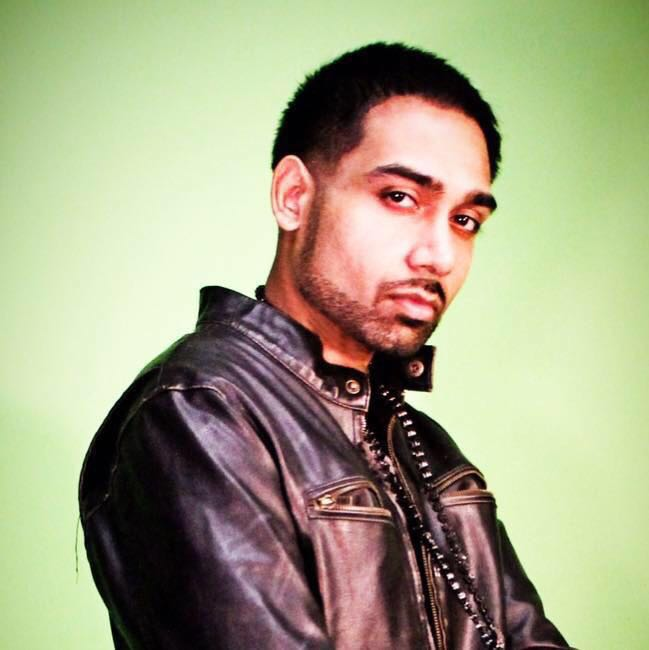
Kamran Rashid Khan, also known as Lazarus, is a graduate of Wayne State University.

- Kamran Pasha – Hollywood screenwriter and director; wrote the Showtime hit series Sleeper Cell
- Kausar Mohammed - actress and comedian
- Kumail Nanjiani – actor and comedian, Franklin & Bash, Silicon Valley.
- Lubna Agha – artist
- Maheen Rizvi – Pakistani-American TV model and actress
- Mehr Hassan – Indian father, Pakistani mother; actress, model and classical dancer
- Mehreen Jabbar – film director
- Minhal Baig – film director
- Munaf Rayani – guitarist for the Texan post-rock band Explosions in the Sky
- Munni Begum – born Nadira; ghazal singer from Pakistan; based in Chicago, Illinois
- Nadia Ali – songwriter and former frontwoman of iiO
- Nargis Fakhri – actress and model of half Pakistani and half Czech descent
- Roger David – stage name Bohemia, rapper from San Francisco
- Romil Hemnani – record producer, recording engineer, and DJ best known for being one of the main producers for American hip hop band BROCKHAMPTON
- Sadia Shepard – filmmaker and author
- Saeeda Imtiaz – Pakistani-American actress
- Salman Ahmad – founder and member of Junoon; lives in New York; a UN Goodwill Ambassador
- Sameer A. Gardezi – Pakistani-American screenwriter for film and television best known for his work on Modern Family
- Samia Khan – Pakistani-American writer and news personality
- Shahzia Sikander – painter
- Shams Charania – prominent NBA reporter for ESPN
- Sitara Hewitt – Canadian-American actress
- Somy Ali – former Bollywood actress, now model and journalist
- Sophia Ali – Pakistani-American actress
- Sumail Hassan – professional Dota 2 player, part of the team Evil Geniuses
- Syma Chowdhry – television personality
- Tony Khan – founder and co-owner of All Elite Wrestling
- Yasmine Yousaf – part of EDM duo Krewella
- Zehra Fazal – actress and comedian
- N3on – streamer and YouTuber

== Military ==
- Captain Humayun Khan of the United States Army – received Purple Heart and Bronze Star for heroic actions during Operation Iraqi Freedom
- Specialist Kareem R.S Khan of the U.S. Army – recipient of the Purple Heart and Bronze Star for heroic actions during Operation Iraqi Freedom

== Pageant winners ==
- Mariyah Moten – born in Karachi, Pakistan; now living in Houston Texas; Pakistan's first Miss Pakistan Bikini; third runner-up in the Miss Pakistan World pageant
- Ramina Ashfaque – Miss Pakistan World 2016–2017; from Miami, Florida

== Politics, government and law ==
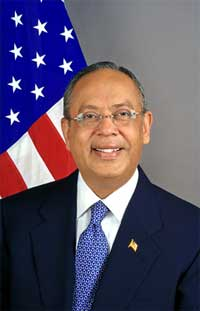
Sada Cumber served as Special Envoy to the Organisation of the Islamic Conference (OIC) on 27 February 2008.

- Akbar Ali (politician) – member of the Georgia House of Representatives (2025–Pres)
- Abid Riaz Qureshi – attorney and legal partner at Latham & Watkins, member of Legal Ethics Committee of District of Columbia Bar and former nominee for federal judge of United States District Court for the District of Columbia
- Asif Chishti MD – Harvard and London School of Economics alum, ex Johnson & Johnson, first head of Pakistan's Vision 2025 at the Planning Commission of Pakistan
- Atif Qarni – Virginia Secretary of Education in the Cabinet of Governor Ralph Northam
- Ali Zaidi – lawyer and policy advisor, Deputy White House National Climate Advisor
- Dilawar Syed – Entrepreneur, Deputy Administrator of the Small Business Administration, Special Representative for Commercial and Business Affairs at the Department of State, highest ranking Muslim American to serve in the executive branch.
- Ehsan Zaffar – senior U.S. government advisor on civil rights
- Faiz Shakir – political advisor, campaign manager for the Bernie Sanders 2020 presidential campaign
- Farrah Khan – Mayor of Irvine, California (2020–2024), member of the Irvine City Council (2018–2024)
- Jay Jalisi – member of the Maryland House of Delegates (2015–2023)
- Lina Khan – legal scholar specializing in US antitrust and competition law, associate professor of law at Columbia Law School, and chair of the Federal Trade Commission
- Mahbub ul Haq – game theorist, economist and an international development theorist. Creator of Human Development Report.
- Maryam Khan – member of the Connecticut House of Representatives (2022–Pres)
- M.J. Khan – member of the Houston City Council (2004–2009)
- Nida Allam – member of the Durham County, North Carolina Commission (2020–pres)
- Sada Cumber – first U.S. envoy to the Organisation of the Islamic Conference
- Sadaf Jaffer – first female Muslim American mayor, first female South Asian mayor, and first female Pakistani-American mayor in the United States, of Montgomery in Somerset County, New Jersey.
- Saghir Tahir – New Hampshire State Representative; the only elected Pakistani American in the Republican Party; re-elected in 2006 for a fourth term to represent Ward 2, District 9 in his home town of Manchester
- Salman Bhojani – member of the Texas House of Representatives (2023–Pres)
- Saqib Ali – served as delegate to the Maryland House of Delegates, elected in 2006, represented the 39th District
- Saud Anwar – member of the Connecticut State Senate (2019–Pres)
- Saira Draper – member of the Georgia House of Representatives (2023–Pres)
- Shama Haider – member of the New Jersey General Assembly (2022–Pres)
- Shamila N. Chaudhary – US government policy adviser
- Shirin R. Tahir-Kheli – White House appointee at various senior posts in the executive branch and the State department during five Republican administrations
- Stephanie Bice – U.S. representative from Oklahoma's 1st Congressional District; former Oklahoma state senator
- Suleman Lalani – member of the Texas House Representatives (2023–Pres)
- Sumbul Siddiqui – Mayor of Cambridge, Massachusetts (2020–2024)
- Zahid Quraishi – United States Magistrate Judge of the United States District Court for the District of New Jersey.
- Zainab Ahmad – prosecutor of the United States Department of Justice, former Assistant United States Attorney for Eastern District of New York. Was a member of the investigation team of the Special Counsel Robert Mueller that investigated possible Russian interference in the 2016 United States elections.

== Sports ==
- Asif Mujtaba – Pakistani cricketer
- Ali Khan – American cricketer
- Farhan Zaidi – President of Baseball Operations, San Francisco Giants
- Gibran Hamdan – professional footballer in the NFL; first person of Pakistani descent to play in the NFL
- Hammad Azam - Pakistani Cricketer
- Hasan Habib – professional poker player
- Mustafa Ali – professional wrestler, currently signed to WWE, first wrestler in WWE of Pakistani descent
- Nasir Javed – professional cricketer
- Nur B. Ali – racecar driver who drives in the ARCA Series for Cunningham Motorsports; the first Pakistani to become a racing driver; former two-time Southwest Formula Mazda Series Champion (2001 and 2002)
- Rashid Zia – professional cricketer; represented the United States in the ICC trophy in 2001
- Sami Aslam - Pakistani Cricketer
- Shayan Jahangir - American cricketer
- Sumail - professional gamer

== Writers ==
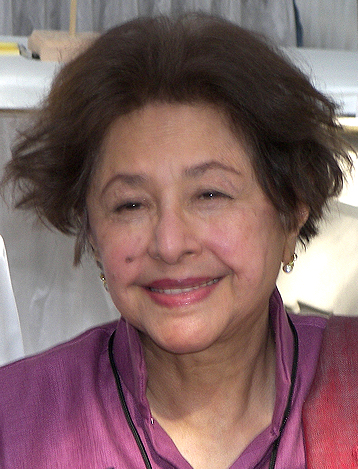
Bapsi Sidhwa at the 2008 Texas Book Festival

- Asma G. Hasan – award-winning writer; works includes the book Red, White, and Muslim, a biographical view of growing up as an American Muslim
- Bapsi Sidhwa – Pakistani novelist and playwright of Parsi-Zoroastrian background who now resides in Texas; her novel Cracking India (which described the Partition of British colonial India) was the basis for Deepa Mehta's film Earth
- Daniyal Mueenuddin – author of the short-story collection In Other Rooms, Other Wonders
- Imad Rahman – fiction writer whose first short story collection was published in 2004
- Maliha Masood – award-winning writer in creative non-fiction; author of the travel memoir Zaatar Days, Henna Nights
- Nabeel Qureshi – Christian apologetic, author, and speaker.
- Noon M. Danish – Pakistani poet of African and Baloch descent
- Nouman Ali Khan – Muslim speaker and author.
- Raees Warsi – award-winning poet; writer and founder of Urdu Markaz New York (Urdu Language Center) in 1989
- Rohina Malik – playwright, actress and solo performance artist
- Samina Quraeshi – award-winning author, artist and designer
- Sana Amanat – American comic book editor for Marvel Comics; co-created the first solo series to feature a Muslim female super hero, Ms. Marvel, which gained worldwide media attention, sparking excitement and dialogue about identity and the Muslim-American struggle
- Shaila Abdullah – Pakistani women's writer and author
- Yasir Qadhi – Muslim author and Islamic teacher
- Zulfikar Ghose – novelist, poet and essayist

== Other ==
- Aasiya Zubair – network executive
- Ashrafuz Zaman Khan, American Muslim cleric
- Ahmad Adaya – American Muslim real estate tycoon and philanthropist; founding partner of prominent California real estate company, IDS Real Estate Group
- Arsalan Iftikhar – American international human rights lawyer headquartered in the metropolitan Washington, D.C., area; founder of TheMuslimGuy; Contributing Editor for Islamica magazine
- Faisal Alam – gay Pakistani-American who founded the Al-Fatiha Foundation, an organization dedicated to advancing the cause of gay, lesbian and transgender Muslims
- Fatima Ali – chef and restaurateur.
- Mohammad S. Hamdani – Muslim Pakistani American medical student who was killed in the September 11, 2001 attacks while rescuing victims at the World Trade Center
- Riffat Hassan – theologian and Islamic feminist scholar of the Qur'an
- Sky Metalwala – child missing from the Seattle area. since 2011
- Yasmin A. Khan – American-Pakistani philanthropist

== See also ==
- Pakistani Americans
- Pakistan – United States relations
- List of Americans in Pakistan
- Pakistani Canadians
- List of Pakistani Canadians
- British Pakistanis
- List of British Pakistanis
- Pakistani Australians
- List of Pakistani Australians
