= List of Americans in Pakistan =

This is a list of Americans in Pakistan. It includes American immigrants or expatriates who have lived in Pakistan, as well as Pakistani people who are of American descent. The list is sorted alphabetically by the individuals' professions or fields of activity to which they have notably made contributions, such as academia and education, the arts, business, crime, diplomacy, literature and journalism, military or intelligence, music, politics, religion, science and technology, and social work.

To be included in this list, the person must have a Wikipedia article or references implying notability, as well as showing that they are American and have resided in Pakistan.

== Academia and education ==
- Jonathan Curiel, journalist; lived in Lahore from 1993 to 1994, teaching journalism at the University of the Punjab as a Fulbright Scholar.
- Charles William Forman, Presbyterian minister and missionary; founder of the Forman Christian College in Lahore in 1864 (then British India).
- Eugene Gardner, physicist; taught the first graduate physics class at the University of Peshawar in 1955–56.
- Ralph Randles Stewart, professor and researcher of botany in Pakistan, based in Rawalpindi.

== Arts and entertainment ==
- Kate Brooks, photojournalist who covered U.S. foreign policy in the region.
- Brian Kershisnik, painter; spent early life in Pakistan.
- Amy Stein, photographer; raised in Karachi.
- Faran Tahir, Pakistani-American actor; raised in Pakistan.

== Business and economics ==
- Yasin Anwar, banker and 17th governor of the State Bank of Pakistan; a dual U.S.-Pakistan citizen.
- Zia Chishti, Pakistani-American business executive
- Sanzar Kakar, Afghan-American entrepreneur and business leader; raised in Peshawar.

== Crime ==
- The D.C. Five, five American citizens imprisoned on charges of terrorism.
- Erik Audé, American actor and stuntman imprisoned for drug trafficking.
- Raymond Allen Davis, former U.S. Army soldier and CIA contractor who shot dead two civilians in Lahore.
- Khalil al-Deek, Jordanian-American charity worker who lived in Peshawar; extradited to Jordan for charges of militancy-related conspiracy.
- Adam Yahiye Gadahn, al-Qaeda operative and spokesperson, of Jewish descent, who converted; killed by U.S. drone strike in Waziristan, near the Afghan border.
- Zahir Jaffer, Pakistani-American citizen involved in the murder of Noor Mukadam in Islamabad.
- John Walker Lindh, Irish-American convicted for militancy in Afghanistan and Pakistan.
- José Padilla, Puerto Rican-American convicted for militancy.
- Stephen Paster, arsonist and member of Jamaat ul-Fuqra who moved to Lahore after release from prison.
- Ahmad Khan Rahami, Afghan-American detained for terrorism; lived for a year in Quetta, where he had relatives.
- Bryant Neal Vinas, Hispanic-American convicted for militancy.

== Diplomacy ==
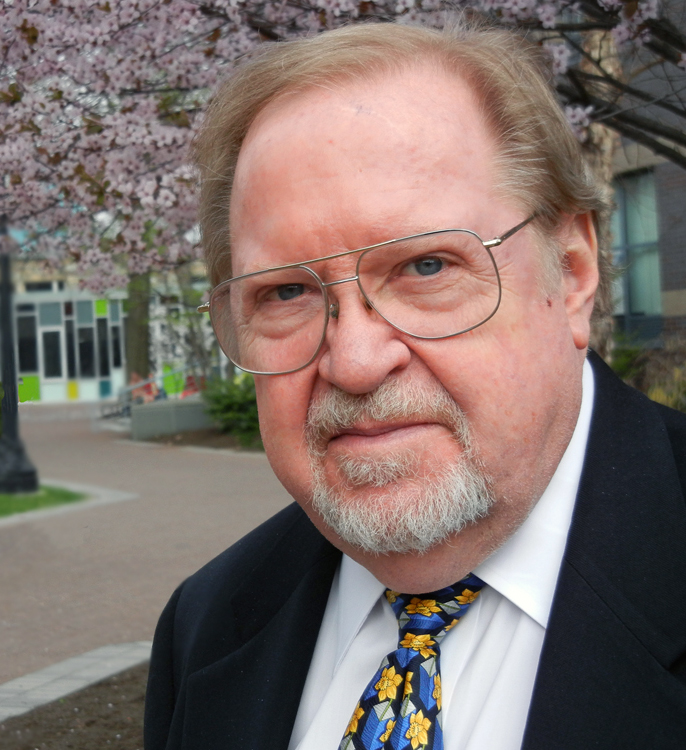
Joseph Melrose, diplomat

- Richard E. Hoagland, deputy U.S. ambassador in Pakistan from 2011 to 2013; also worked in the country from 1986 to 1989, coordinating resistance efforts during the Soviet war in Afghanistan.
- Christopher Van Hollen, Sr., diplomat and Foreign Service officer; served in Pakistan.
- James Howard Holmes, member of the Foreign Service; served at the U.S. consulate general in Lahore from 1968 to 1970.
- Dennis Kux, diplomat; served in Pakistan from 1957 to 1959 and 1969 to 1971.
- Donald Lu, diplomat; served as a political officer at the U.S. consulate general in Peshawar.
- Joseph Melrose, diplomat; served as consul-general at the U.S. consulate general in Karachi during the 1980s and 1990s.
- Leon B. Poullada, Mexican-American career diplomat; served in Pakistan.
- Howard Bruner Schaffer, diplomat and academic; served as political counselor to the U.S. embassy in Islamabad from 1974 to 1977.
- Thomas W. Simons Jr., diplomat and academic; raised and attended school in Karachi

== Health and medicine ==
- Zaheer Ahmad, Pakistani-American physician; founded the Shifa International Hospital.
- John Harland Bryant, physician; professor and chairman at the community health sciences department of Aga Khan University from 1985 to 1993.
- Adil Haider, Pakistani-American trauma surgeon; moved to Pakistan in the 1980s, where he completed his schooling and medical education.
- Joseph B. McCormick, physician and scientist; served as chairman of the community health sciences department at Aga Khan University from 1993 to 1997.

Cynthia Haq, MD, Fulbright teaching scholar and visiting professor 1990 to 91. Helped establish the first Family Medicine residency training program at the Aga Khan University. Continued to collaborate with faculty at AKU until Family Medicine was established as a department. Mentor to Waris Qidwai MBBS, who became professor of Family Medicine and head of the department at the Aga Khan University School of Medicine.

== Literature, activism and journalism ==
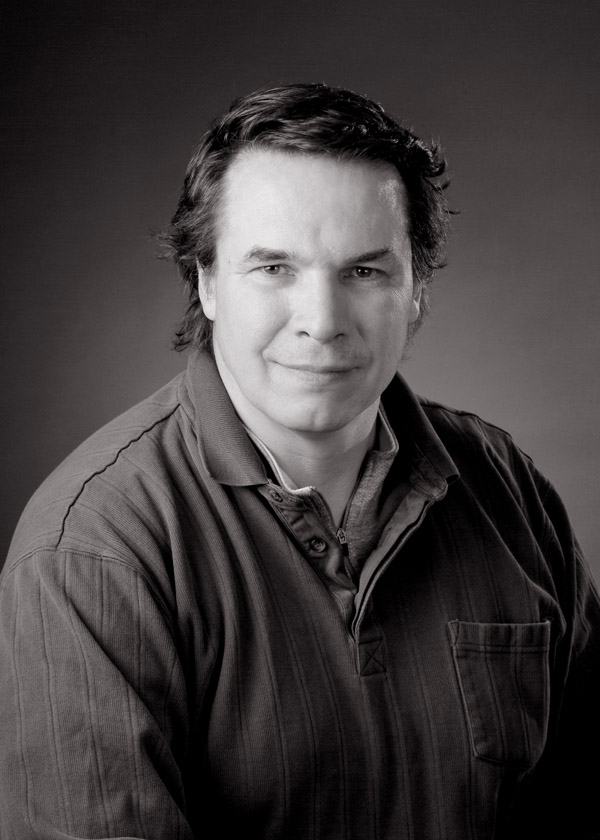
Greg Mortenson, author

- Steve LeVine, journalist and writer; based in Pakistan as a foreign correspondent from 1988 to 1991.
- Greg Mortenson, mountaineer and humanitarian in northern Pakistan; author of the bestselling books Three Cups of Tea and Stones into Schools.
- Daniyal Mueenuddin, Pakistani-American author; spent early life in Pakistan.
- Steven Naifeh, Arab-American author and artist; spent early life in Pakistan.
- Asra Nomani, Indian-American journalist and writer; worked as a correspondent in Karachi.
- Cynthia D. Ritchie, American blogger and filmmaker based in Pakistan.
- Muhammad Syed, Pakistani-American atheist writer, speaker and activist who grew up in Pakistan.

== Military, intelligence and law enforcement ==
- Jonathan Bank, CIA station chief in Pakistan; removed in 2010.
- Milton Bearden, CIA station chief during the late 1980s.
- Karl Clark, police officer who served in Pakistan with ICITAP.
- Robert Grenier, CIA station chief in 2001.
- Howard Hart, CIA station chief from 1981 to 1984.
- Marc Sageman, CIA operations officer; based in Islamabad from 1987 to 1989, working with anti-Soviet resistance in Afghanistan.
- Chuck Yeager, U.S. advisor to the Pakistan Air Force from 1971 to 1973.

== Music ==
- Brian O'Connell, multi-instrumentalist and producer; member of the Pakistani Sufi rock band Junoon.

== Politics ==
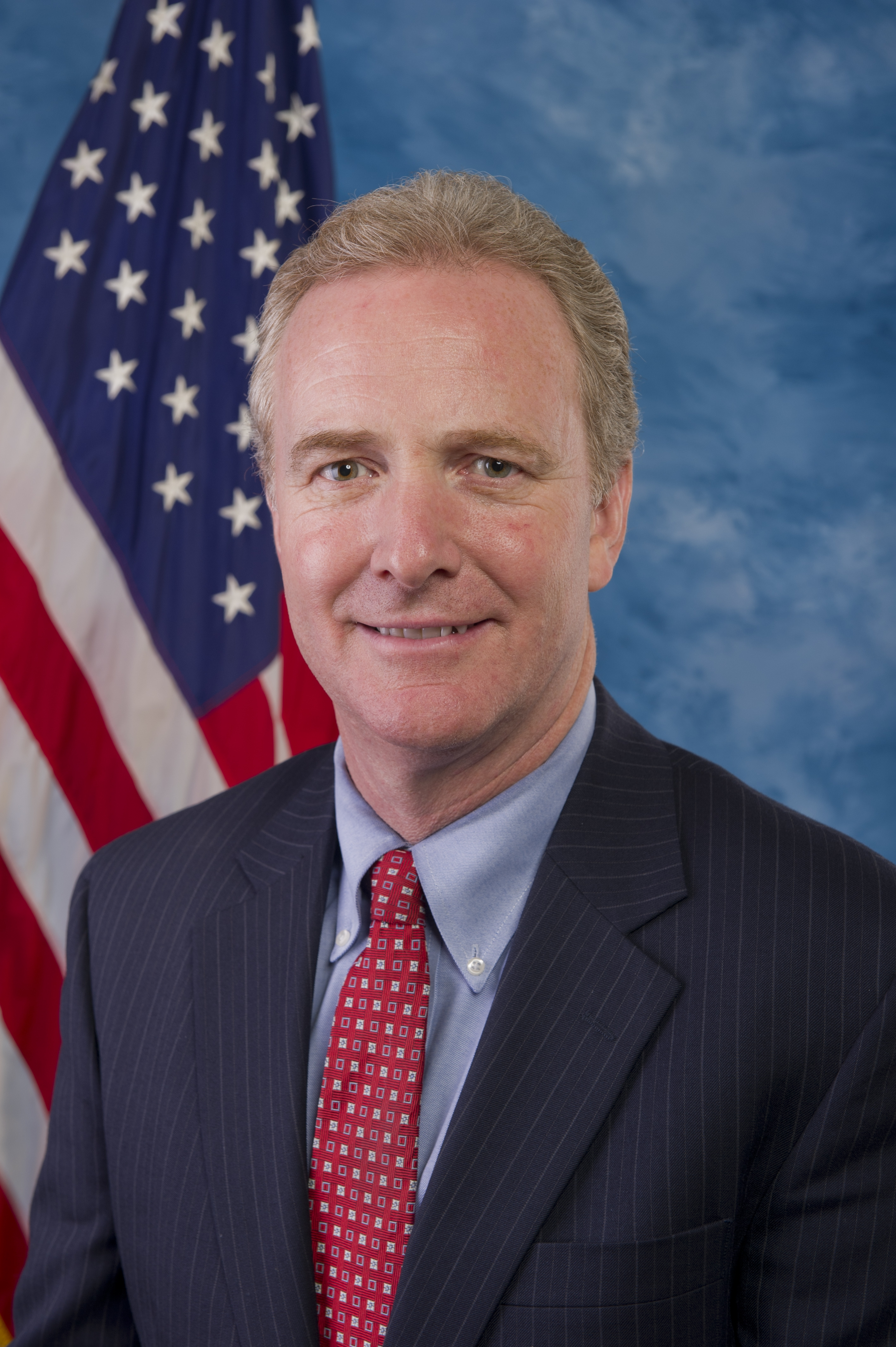
Chris Van Hollen, U.S. Congressman

- Nasim Ashraf, Pakistani-American physician; served as minister of state, and chairman of the National Commission for Human Development and Pakistan Cricket Board during the Musharraf government.
- Daniyal Aziz, Pakistani politician and Member of the National Assembly; of American descent through his mother.
- Amna Buttar, Pakistani politician and Member of the Provincial Assembly of the Punjab; dually holds American citizenship.
- Hoddy Hildreth, lawyer, conservationist and politician who served as a member of the Maine House of Representatives; lived and studied in Pakistan where his father Horace Hildreth was the U.S. ambassador.
- Chris Van Hollen, Democratic Party member and U.S. Representative from Maryland; born in Karachi and son of diplomat Christopher Van Hollen, Sr. who served in the country; first Pakistan-born member of the United States Congress.
- Fauzia Kasuri, Pakistani politician; previously held American citizenship.
- Dale Kildee, Democratic Party member and U.S. Representative from Michigan; pursued graduate studies in history and political science under a Rotary Foundation fellowship at the University of Peshawar from 1958 to 1959.
- Azam Khan Swati, Pakistani politician formerly serving as a senator and federal minister; previously held American citizenship.

== Religion ==
- Hobart Baumann Amstutz, Christian missionary and Methodist Bishop of Pakistan from 1964 to 1968.
- Maryam Jameelah, Muslim writer and historian; converted from Judaism to Islam and emigrated to Pakistan in 1962.
- K. Gunn McKay, Mormon missionary and U.S. Congressman.
- J. Dudley Woodberry, Christian missionary and teacher.
- Norman Wray, Roman Catholic missionary and social worker based in Karachi.

== Science and technology ==
- Mark Schaller, psychological scientist; spent early life in Pakistan.
- Curt Teichert, German-American palaeontologist and geologist; worked in Quetta from 1961 to 1964 studying paleontology and geology of the Salt Range, and conducting stratigraphic research.

== Sports ==
- Bashir Ahmad, Pakistani-American mixed martial artist.

== Social work ==
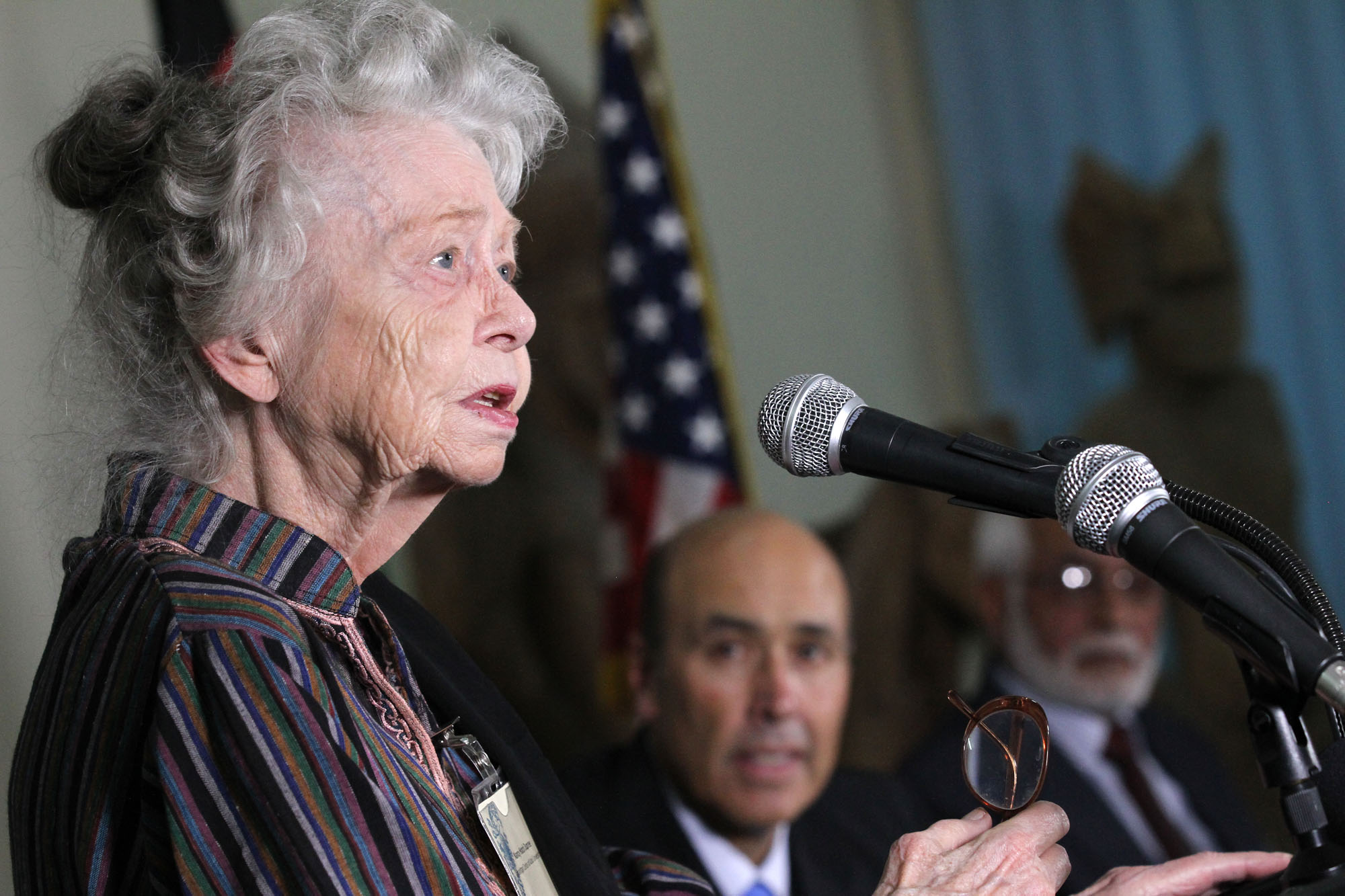
Nancy Dupree, social worker

- Ann Dunham, cottage industries development consultant for Agricultural Development Bank of Pakistan (ADBP) in Gujranwala; mother of U.S. president Barack Obama.
- Louis Dupree, professor, archaeologist and anthropologist of Afghan history; spent time in Pakistan as Fulbright Scholar and assisting Afghan immigrants in Peshawar.
- Nancy Dupree, archaeologist of Afghan history; spent time in Peshawar running a resource centre for Afghan immigrants.
- Marla Ruzicka, activist and aid worker; initially based in Peshawar to cover the Afghan war.
- John Solecki, UNHCR officer based in Quetta; taken hostage and released in 2009.
- Warren Weinstein, development contractor based in Lahore; taken hostage by militants and later killed in a U.S. drone strike near the Afghan border.

== See also ==
- List of Pakistani Americans
- Pakistan–United States relations
