= List of Pakistani Canadians =

This is a list of Pakistani Canadians.

== Academics ==
- Sajida Alvi – academic of Pakistani origin in Canada; historian of Islam in South Asia
- Naz Ikramullah
- Rukhsana Khan – children's author and storyteller
- Munir Sheikh – 10th Chief Statistician of Canada, replaced Ivan Fellegi
- Naweed Syed – Professor at and Head of Department of Cell Biology & Anatomy at the University of Calgary; first person to connect brain cells to a silicon chip
- Zulfiqar Bhutta – Professor at the Department of Nutritional Sciences and the Division of Epidemiology, Dalla Lana School of Public Health of the University of Toronto.

== Arts and fashion ==
=== Pageants ===
- Sonia Ahmed – President of Miss Pakistan World, Mrs. Pakistan World

=== Models ===
- Yasmeen Ghauri – Victoria's Secret supermodel

=== Urdu poets ===
- Musharraf Ali Farooqi – writer and translator
- Shan-ul-Haq Haqqee
- Ashfaq Hussain – Urdu poet

== Entertainment and media ==
=== Film ===
- Sabreen Hisbani - actress
- Hamza Haq – actor
- Sitara Hewitt – actress
- Omar Majeed – filmmaker
- Ali Mukaddam – actor
- Zarqa Nawaz – director and producer; known for CBC serial Little Mosque on the Prairie
- Zaib Shaikh – actor
- Kris Siddiqi – actor and comedian
- Iman Vellani - actress
- Ahad Raza Mir - actor

=== Journalists ===
- Suroosh Alvi – journalist and co-founder of VICE magazine

=== Musicians ===
- Tariq Hussain – singer-songwriter and radio host
- Qurram Hussain – member of JoSH
- Sohail Rana

=== TV personalities ===
- Sabrina Jalees – Canadian comedian
- Adnan Virk – sports anchor for ESPN

== Politics ==
- Salma Ataullahjan – Senator
- Iqra Khalid – current member of the House of Commons of Canada
- Wajid Khan – former member of the House of Commons of Canada
- Ausma Malik – Deputy Mayor of Toronto and City Councillor Ward 10 Spadina—Fort York
- Yasir Naqvi – former member of the Legislative Assembly of Ontario and Attorney General of Ontario
- Shafiq Qaadri – former member of the Legislative Assembly of Ontario
- Shad Qadri – Ottawa City Councillor for Ward 6
- Shiraz Shariff – former member of the Legislative Assembly of Alberta
- Salma Zahid – current member of the House of Commons of Canada

== Sports ==
- Cecil Pervez - Canadian cricket player
- Qaiser Ali – Canadian cricket player
- Umar Bhatti – Canadian cricket player
- Saad Bin Zafar – Canadian cricketer
- Rizwan Cheema – Canadian cricketer
- Hamza Tariq – Canadian cricketer
- Asif Dar – Canadian boxer
- Mian Hussain – Canadian professional boxer
- Obby Khan – offensive lineman of the Winnipeg Blue Bombers
- Maria Toorpakay Wazir – Pakistani squash player currently resident in Toronto, Ontario
- Kaleem Sana - Canadian Cricketer

== Others ==
- Ali A. Rizvi – writer and podcaster
- Zafar Bangash – commentator
- Muhammad Tahir-ul-Qadri – Islamic scholar
- Malala Yousafzai – education activist

== See also ==
- Canada–Pakistan relations
- Pakistani Canadian
- List of Pakistani Americans
- List of British Pakistanis
- List of Pakistani Australians
