= Shayan Mahmud =

Pakistani business executive (born 1991)

- Born: Shayan Mahmud; 1 January 1991 (age 35); Islamabad, Pakistan
- Education: University of East Anglia; Regent's University London
- Occupations: Business executive, entrepreneur
- Known for: Co-founder at Eikon7, Trademor, Mode Mobility, and Fourth Wall Studios
- Title: CEO at ProPakistani

Shayan Mahmud (January 1, 1991) is a Pakistani business executive and media entrepreneur based in Islamabad. He is the CEO of ProPakistani, a Pakistani technology and business news website, and a co-founder and managing partner of Eikon7, an advertising and digital marketing agency with operations in Pakistan, Romania, Rwanda, and the United Arab Emirates.

Mahmud became CEO of ProPakistani in May 2023, succeeding founder Aamir Attaa, after previously serving as its chief brand officer. He co-founded Trademor in 2017, a company providing trade services in Pakistan as an Alibaba.com channel partner and was a co-founder of the electric vehicle startup Mode Mobility. He also hosts the podcast How Does It Work.

Mahmud was named to the Forbes 30 Under 30 Asia list in 2021 and to the World Economic Forum's Young Global Leaders in 2026.

== Background ==
Mahmud was born on January 1, 1991, and raised in Islamabad, Pakistan. As a child, he experienced ADHD-related difficulties; his parents took him to Shifa International Hospitals and Aga Khan University Hospital, and later to London, England, to see psychologists. His mother Naureen Mahmud fought brain cancer and recovered. He attended the University of East Anglia in England, where he earned a Diploma in Business in 2011. He holds a Bachelor of Arts (Honours) in International Business from Regent's University London since 2016.

== Career ==
Mahmud is a co-founder and managing partner of Eikon7, an advertising and digital marketing agency operating in Pakistan, Romania, Rwanda, and the United Arab Emirates.

In 2017, Mahmud co-founded Trademor and serves as the chairman for a company that provides Alibaba.com-related trade services in Pakistan.

Mahmud was also a co-founder of Mode Mobility, a Pakistani startup developing electric two-wheelers designed for the local market, including a model aimed at women riders.

In May 2023, Mahmud was named CEO of ProPakistani, succeeding founder Aamir Attaa, having previously served as the outlet's chief brand officer. ProPakistani had earlier attracted an eight-figure funding round, reported in 2019 by Dawn Media.

Mahmud founded Fourth Wall Studios, a theater group aiming to revive stage productions in Pakistan.

In addition to his business roles, Mahmud hosts How Does It Work, a podcast covering business, sports, and current affairs.

== Recognition ==
- 2021: Mahmud was named to the Forbes 30 Under 30 Asia list.
- 2026: Mahmud was named among Young Global Leaders by the World Economic Forum.
