= 1991 Toronto bomb plot =

Islamist terror plot in Toronto

The 1991 Toronto bomb plot refers to an Islamist terror plot that sought to attack two Toronto buildings - the India Centre cinema and the Vishnu Hindu temple, it was the first 'homegrown' Islamic terrorist plot on Toronto.

Eventually, Canadian authorities arrested five men of Trinidadian and Dominican ethnicity, and accused them of ties to Jamaat ul-Fuqra alongside the bomb plot. All five were acquitted of the main charge of conspiring to commit murder.

== Arrests ==
Four of the men tried to cross the Rainbow Bridge into the United States in October 1991. Customs officials searched their Buick and Chevrolet Suburban and found "detailed plans to bomb a York Region Hindu temple and an Indian theater in Toronto", including aerial photographs and blueprints of the Vishnu Mandir Temple and India Centre cinema, as well as references to a "hit team," a "guard team" and "recon team", and amateur videotapes of the men, and the interiors of the buildings.

One document led police to a Brooklyn address and a cache of two rifles, seven handguns and 2,000 rounds of ammunition.

— John Goddard

Name	Residence	Age
Glenn Neville Ford	Toronto, Ontario, Canada	41
Khidr Ali	Toronto, Ontario, Canada	28
Caba Jose Harris	Texas, USA	28
Robert Junior Wesley	Texas, USA	50
Tyrone Junior Cole	Texas, USA	34

Each of the men were charged with conspiracy to commit mischief and conspiracy to commit murder.

== Trial ==
Eight men were accused in total. One was dismissed. Fongenie escaped to Pakistan. A Brooklyn man pleaded guilty to weapons offences. Ford, the three Texans and another Toronto man, Khidr Ali, were sent to trial. The trial was moved to St. Catharines from Toronto, and began in October 1993 The Metro Toronto Police, in a move later attributed to the fact they "still really didn't know what to do with their intelligence unit", assigned their security intelligence officers to take up heavy arms and guard the courthouse.

Assistant Crown Attorney Philip Enright described documents found in the defendants' cars that suggested entering a building through a men's washroom window, and possibly having a female operative planting a bomb in the women's washroom.

It was revealed that the Chevrolet searched at the border belonged to American Mustafa Abdu Rashid, and that the men had phoned him thirty times from the car phone in the vehicle. A search of Rashid's apartment revealed nine semi-automatic firearms.

The three Americans were deported from Canada after their sentences were completed in April 2006, and Harris was added to the TSA's no-fly list, as was Wesley and his aliases Robert Fitz Clarence, Bobby Johnson and Wali Muhammad.
