= List of Pakistani Australians =

This is a list of Pakistani Australians. It includes Australian citizens and permanent residents of Pakistani ancestry, Pakistani-origin first generation immigrants who were naturalised with Australian citizenship, as well as expatriates who are known to have resided in Australia. The list is sorted alphabetically by the individuals' professions or fields of activity to which they have notably made contributions, such as academia and education, early history, entertainment, politics, religion, science and technology, sports, literature and the arts.

To be included in this list, the person must have a Wikipedia article showing they are Pakistani Australian or must have references showing they are Pakistani Australian and are notable.

== Prominent Academia and educationists ==
- Rafat Hussain, specialist on health care
- Sara Ahmed, academic of feminist theory, queer theory, critical race theory and postcolonialism
- Sohail Inayatullah, futurologist
- Ahmar Mahboob, linguist
- Samina Yasmeen, specialist on political and strategic development

== Early history and exploration ==
- Dervish Bejah, Baloch cameleer in South Australia.
- Fazal Deen, hawker, battery operator and businessman.
- Monga Khan, hawker from Mirpur (now Azad Kashmir) who settled in Victoria.
- Muhammad Hassan Musa Khan, Pashtun cameleer from Karachi who came to Australia in 1896 and was appointed as arbitrator in a court case in 1899 involving camel importation.
- Dost Mahomet, Baloch cameleer in Western Australia.

== Entertainment and media ==
- Adil Memon, indie singer-songwriter, The X Factor season 4 contestant and Australia's Got Talent season 4 semi-finalist (with sister Maimuna Memon)
- Sami Shah, stand-up comedian and writer
- Shanina Shaik, model

== Literature and art ==
- Azhar Abidi, novelist and translator
- Hanifa Deen, author and social commentator
- Ashraf Shad, Urdu novelist, poet and journalist
- Irfan Yusuf, author and social commentator

=== Activists ===
- Osman Faruqi, Pakistani-Australian journalist, editor, and political commentator
- Mariam Mohammed, Pakistani-Australian women's rights activist and entrepreneur

== Politics ==
- Bisma Asif, an MP in the Legislative Assembly of Queensland.
- Mehreen Faruqi, member of the Australian Senate for Greens from New South Wales, and formerly an MP in the New South Wales Legislative Council.

== Religion ==
- Arnold Heredia, Christian priest
- Daniel Scot, Christian missionary

== Science and technology ==
- Shahbaz Khan, hydrologist

== Sports ==
- Fawad Ahmed, cricketer
- Rameez Junaid, tennis player
- Arshad Khan, former Pakistani cricketer now living in Australia
- Usman Khawaja, cricketer
- Usman Qadir, Pakistani cricketer, moved to Australia in 2012
- Clive Rose, Tasmanian cricketer
- Duncan Sharpe, former Pakistani cricketer, moved to Australia and played for South Australia
- Waqar Younis, former Pakistani cricketer, lives in Australia with family

== See also ==
- Lists of Australians
- List of Pakistanis
- Pakistani Australians
