= Syed Ghulam Nabi Fai =

American citizen of Kashmiri origin

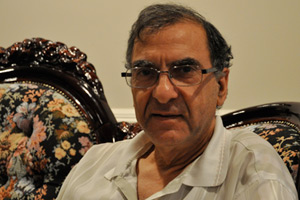
- Born: Syed Ghulam Nabi Fai; April 1949 (age 77); Wadwan, Jammu and Kashmir, India
- Citizenship: United States
- Education: Temple University
- Criminal charge: Conspiracy to defraud the US by violation of Foreign Agents Registration Act
- Criminal status: Convicted and sentenced to two years imprisonment

Syed Ghulam Nabi Fai (born April 1949) is an American citizen of Kashmiri origin, and a Jamaat-e-Islami activist. He founded the organisation Kashmiri American Council in the United States and carried out lobbying on behalf of Kashmiri separatist groups and the Government of Pakistan. In 2011, the US government stated that this was a front group for Pakistan's Inter-Services Intelligence (ISI).

Fai was arrested by the Federal Bureau of Investigation on 19 July 2011, for acting as an unregistered foreign agent, concealing the transfer of USD 3.5 million from Pakistan's ISI to fund his lobbying efforts and influence the US government on the Kashmir conflict, in violation of the Foreign Agents Registration Act. His arrest came at a time when relations between Pakistan and the United States were strained in the aftermath of the raid that killed Osama bin Laden in Pakistan, and while US Secretary of State Hillary Clinton was on a visit to India. On 7 December 2011, Fai pleaded guilty to conspiracy and tax evasion (both charges); in March 2012, Fai was sentenced to two years' imprisonment by a US court for "conspiracy to defraud the US" by concealing transfer of funding from Pakistan's ISI for his illegal lobbying efforts on Kashmir.

== Early life ==
Syed Ghulam Nabi Fai was born in April 1949 in the Wadwan village of Budgam district in the Kashmir Valley of Jammu and Kashmir, India. He graduated from Srinagar's Sri Pratap College, then completed an MA from Aligarh Muslim University. During his college days, he came under the influence of Jamaat-e-Islami Kashmir. He occasionally wrote columns in the local newspapers under the name "Fay Budgami", which eventually resulted in his acquired last name "Fai". Mohammad Yusuf Shah, who later became the chief of the terror outfit Hizbul Mujahideen, is said to have been his childhood friend.

Fai moved to Saudi Arabia in 1967, and then went to the United States. He obtained a PhD in mass communications from the Temple University in 1977. He became a US citizen in 1990.

== Fraudulent academic credentials ==
For decades, Fai has claimed, as he continues to, to have earned a PhD from Temple University in Philadelphia and constantly referred to himself as "Dr. Fai", as was echoed in the Pakistani media. After moving to the United States in 1977 he began a course in mass communications at Temple University on 'Television in Saudi Arabia'. He completed less than half the PhD requirements and did not receive a degree, yet constantly referred to himself as "Dr. Fai" in official correspondence with the FBI and other law enforcement bodies. As of 2019, he continues to use his false "PhD" credential in his public engagements, and press outlets.

== Kashmiri American Council ==
Fai was the executive director of the Kashmiri American Council (KAC), an ISI module based in Washington, D.C., for the cause of "propagating the cause of the right of self-determination of the people of the State of Jammu & Kashmir". The KAC was formed by some members of the Kashmiri diaspora,[2] in Washington, D.C. In the 1990s, Paul Manafort lobbied for the KAC.

According to the FBI, the Kashmiri American Council - a nonprofit organization - would arrange seminars, conferences and lectures on Kashmir. Officially the KAC denied getting any foreign grants. KAC is best known for annually holding a so-called "Kashmir Peace Conference" in Washington, D.C., which was presented as "an independent forum for Indian, Pakistani and Kashmiri voices". However, the U.S. Justice Department proved in court that the Pakistan Army, specifically the I.S.I., approved the list of speakers and gave Fai talking points to "highlight the Kashmir cause".

== Political access ==
Before his arrest in July 2011 and subsequent electronically monitored house arrest in Virginia, USA, he was a regular visitor to Pakistan and met regularly and openly with the highest levels of the political, bureaucratic and military establishment, including the Inter-Services Intelligence (ISI). In the US, Fai's access extended to various mid-level officials in the State Department, as well as a variety of backbenchers including non-ranking Congressmen and a handful of Senators. Typically, his access was limited to those Congressmen to whose election funds the Kashmir American Council (see above) had donated monies, including Joe Pitts (R-Pennsylvania) and Dan Burton (R-Indiana). Fai has never had a meeting with any Secretary of State or with a serving US Ambassador or equivalent rank of official.

Since forfeiting his Indian citizenship by taking US citizenship in 1990, he has been denied visas to visit India on account of his now-publicly-reported ties to the Pakistani Military, in particular the Inter-Services Intelligence (ISI). He has never had a meeting in any third country with any Indian elected official or any senior diplomat.

== Arrest ==
Fai was charged along with a Pakistani American associate named Zaheer Ahmad for obtaining illegal funding from Pakistan for the KAC. Fai was arrested at his home in Fairfax, Virginia. According to Neil MacBride, the United States Attorney at United States District Court for the Eastern District of Virginia "Mr. Fai is accused of a decades-long scheme with one purpose – to hide Pakistan's involvement behind his efforts to influence the U.S. government's position on Kashmir, his handlers in Pakistan allegedly funneled millions through the Kashmir Center to contribute to U.S. elected officials, fund high-profile conferences, and pay for other efforts that promoted the Kashmiri cause in favor of Pakistan to decision makers in Washington." According to prosecutors he was directed by ISI and was in touch with them at least 4000 times in the preceding 3 years. The prosecutors also alleged that Kashmiri American Council was run by elements of Pakistani government including ISI and had Fai had received at least $4 million from the Government of Pakistan. If convicted Fai faces up to 5 years in prison. Zaheer Ahmad was not arrested and was thought to be living in Pakistan. On 8 October 2011, it was reported that Ahmad had died in Islamabad at the age of 63 due to a brain haemorrhage.

=== Bail ===
At his initial court appearance, the prosecution claimed that, after his arrest, Fai had admitted to receiving money from ISI but said that he maintained an independent viewpoint on issues pertaining to Kashmir. FBI agent Sarah Linden stated that previously Fai had denied knowing anyone from ISI. Fai himself said nothing at the trial. He was granted bail and placed under house arrest. His and his wife's passports were confiscated, and Fai was forbidden from making any contact with any foreign government or witness.

=== Guilty plea ===
On 7 December 2011, Fai pleaded guilty in the court of conspiracy and tax evasion. As part of his guilty plea, Fai signed an 81-paragraph "Statement of Fact" cataloguing his crimes, with specific details as to the instructions and payments he received from his ISI handlers. Court documents revealed his primary ISI handlers to have been Javeed Aziz Khan (alias "Brigadier Abdullah ('Khan')"; Major-General Mumtaz Ahmad Bajwa, who later became head of the ISI's Security Directorate that oversees Kashmiri militant groups, Lieutenant-Colonel Touqeer Mehmood Butt, and Sohail Mahmood (alias "Mir"). An attorney submitted in a foot-note to a US district court in Alexandria, Virginia, that Fai misled people about possessing a doctorate degree. In March 2012 Fai was sentenced to two years in prison.

=== Sentence reduction and release ===
On 15 November 2013, the Assistant US Attorney who had prosecuted Fai asked the court to reduce Fai's sentence to 16 months time served. The motion was granted by the original sentencing judge on 22 November 2013, and Fai was released from the Federal Correctional Institution in Cumberland, Maryland.

== Reactions ==
The Embassy of Pakistan in Washington, D.C. issued a statement after the arrest claiming that "it had no knowledge" of Fai's alleged ties with the Pakistani establishment, though he was a regular visitor to the Embassy. However an unnamed Pakistani official told The Independent that Fai was getting funding from ISI as he was unable to raise money from the Pakistani American community. The Pakistani government lodged its concern over the arrest and accused the US of embarking on a "slander campaign" against Pakistan. The Ministry of Foreign Affairs of Pakistan released a statement lauding the "contributions made by the Kashmiri American Council and Dr Ghulam Nabi Fai for the cause of Jammu and Kashmir." It further commented that "upholding fundamental rights of Kashmiris is the fundamental responsibility of the international community and all conscientious people who value human rights and values" and added that "campaigns to defame the just cause of the Kashmiri people will not affect its legitimacy."

A statement released by the Home ministry of India said "The arrest of Ghulam Nabi Fai was long overdue. We had (a) fair degree of suspicion that the money which he received was given by the agencies in Pakistan."

Fai donated money to Congressman Joseph R. Pitts over the years. After finding out about Fai's arrest, Pitts donated the same amount to charity. Pitts denied knowing Fai had external financings. In a letter published in Intelligencer Journal Pitt wrote "Clearly, much more was going on. Dr. Fai will get his day in court. Before long, we will learn exactly what he was doing behind the scenes. Whatever the ISI hoped to accomplish, it didn't work."

U.S representative from Indiana Dan Burton, who frequently supports Pakistan's position on Kashmir, was a major recipient of contributions from Fai. Expressing shock at his arrest, Burton admitted to having known Fai for more than 20 years and stated "in that time I had no inkling of his involvement with any foreign intelligence operation and had presumed our correspondence was legitimate". He said that funds he received from Fai would be donated to the Boy Scouts of America. Fai's arrest was condemned by separatist Kashmiri leader Syed Ali Shah Geelani, who described him as their "ambassador".

His arrest was welcomed by the Kashmiri Pandit community. According to Lalit Koul, the President of the Indo-American Kashmir Forum, "It was always clear that this (Fai's) group was following the official Pakistani version of the Kashmir story. In all instances, the truth was obfuscated by misinformation provided by our opponents masquerading as Kashmiri freedom fighters."

== Post release ==
After being released, as of March 2020, it was reported that Fai has appeared on media channels across US to highlight "Indian atrocities in Kashmir and against Muslims", authored articles, collaborated with Indian influencers, and resumed his interactions with members of the US Senate.

== Family ==
Fai is married to a Chinese woman in the United States and has two children.

== Writings ==
Fai has authored and contributed to numerous articles and opinion pieces focused primarily on the Kashmir conflict, its geopolitical implications, and advocacy for the Kashmiri people's right to self-determination. His writings have appeared in various international publications and forums: he has written for platforms such as The Washington Times and Eurasia Review, where he has discussed the human rights situation in Jammu and Kashmir, urged international mediation, and criticized Indian government policies in the region. Among Pakistani publications, he has been a regular columnist for 24 Digital.

== See also ==
- India–United States relations
- Kashmir conflict
- Pakistan lobby in the United States
- Pakistan–United States relations
