= The September Issue =

- Theatrical release poster
- Directed by: R.J. Cutler
- Produced by: Eliza Hindmarch; Sadia Shepard; R.J. Cutler
- Starring: Anna Wintour; Grace Coddington
- Cinematography: Robert Richman
- Edited by: Azin Samari
- Music by: Craig Richey
- Production companies: A&E IndieFilms; Actual Reality Pictures
- Distributed by: Roadside Attractions
- Release dates: January 16, 2009 (Sundance); August 28, 2009 (United States)
- Running time: 90 minutes
- Country: United States
- Language: English
- Box office: $6.4 million

The September Issue is a 2009 American documentary film directed by R.J. Cutler about the behind-the-scenes drama that follows editor-in-chief Anna Wintour and her staff during the production of the September 2007 issue of American Vogue magazine.

The film was released in Australia on August 20, 2009, after being screened at numerous film festivals including Sundance, Zurich, Silverdocs, and Sheffield Doc/Fest. It was released in select theaters in the United States on August 28, 2009, by Roadside Attractions.

== Synopsis ==
The film revolves around the making of the September 2007 issue of Vogue. (The September Vogue is traditionally the biggest, most important issue of the year.) It depicts the effort that goes into making the magazine, and the passion that Grace Coddington, a former model-turned-creative director and the only person who dares to stand up to Anna Wintour, has for the highly regarded fashion magazine. In the film, Coddington is often portrayed as the leading victim to Wintour's aggressive personality. The relationship between Wintour and Coddington reveals itself to be symbiotic, as Wintour recognizes Coddington's expertise and keen eye for design. In the end, Wintour approves most of Coddington's ideas and they appear in the final version of the September issue.

== Notable fashion icons ==
The film features appearances by many well-known and influential people in the fashion industry, from top editorial models to noted fashion photographers and designers.

=== Designers ===
- John Galliano
- Oscar de la Renta
- Jean-Paul Gaultier
- Nicolas Ghesquière
- Karl Lagerfeld
- Thakoon Panichgul
- Stefano Pilati
- Jane Thompson
- Isabel Toledo
- Vera Wang

=== Models ===
- Coco Rocha
- Caroline Trentini
- Daria Werbowy
- Raquel Zimmermann
- Hilary Rhoda
- Sienna Miller
- Chanel Iman
- Lily Donaldson
- Lily Cole

=== Photographers ===
- Patrick Demarchelier
- Steven Klein
- Craig McDean
- Mario Testino
- David Sims

=== Others ===
- Hamish Bowles
- Edward Enninful
- Si Newhouse
- André Leon Talley
- Robert Verdi

== Critical response ==
The September Issue received positive reviews from critics upon release. On Rotten Tomatoes, the film holds an approval rating of 83% based on 114 reviews, with an average rating of 7/10. The site's critics consensus reads: "This documentary about the making of Vogue's biggest issue and its frosty editor-in-chief is fascinating eye candy and light-on-its-feet fun." On Metacritic, it has a weighted average score of 69 out of 100, based on 28 reviews, indicating "favorable reviews".

== Demand for namesake ==
Due to the popularity of the film, the September 2007 issue of Vogue that was documented in the film has peaked to prices between $80 and $115 on eBay, making it one of the most sought-after issues ever. Although the 840-page issue is massive, it is not the biggest Vogue issue ever, as the September 2012 issue beats it by 76 pages (916).
