= Shifa International Hospitals =

Hospital chain based in Islamabad, Pakistan

Shifa International Hospitals Limited
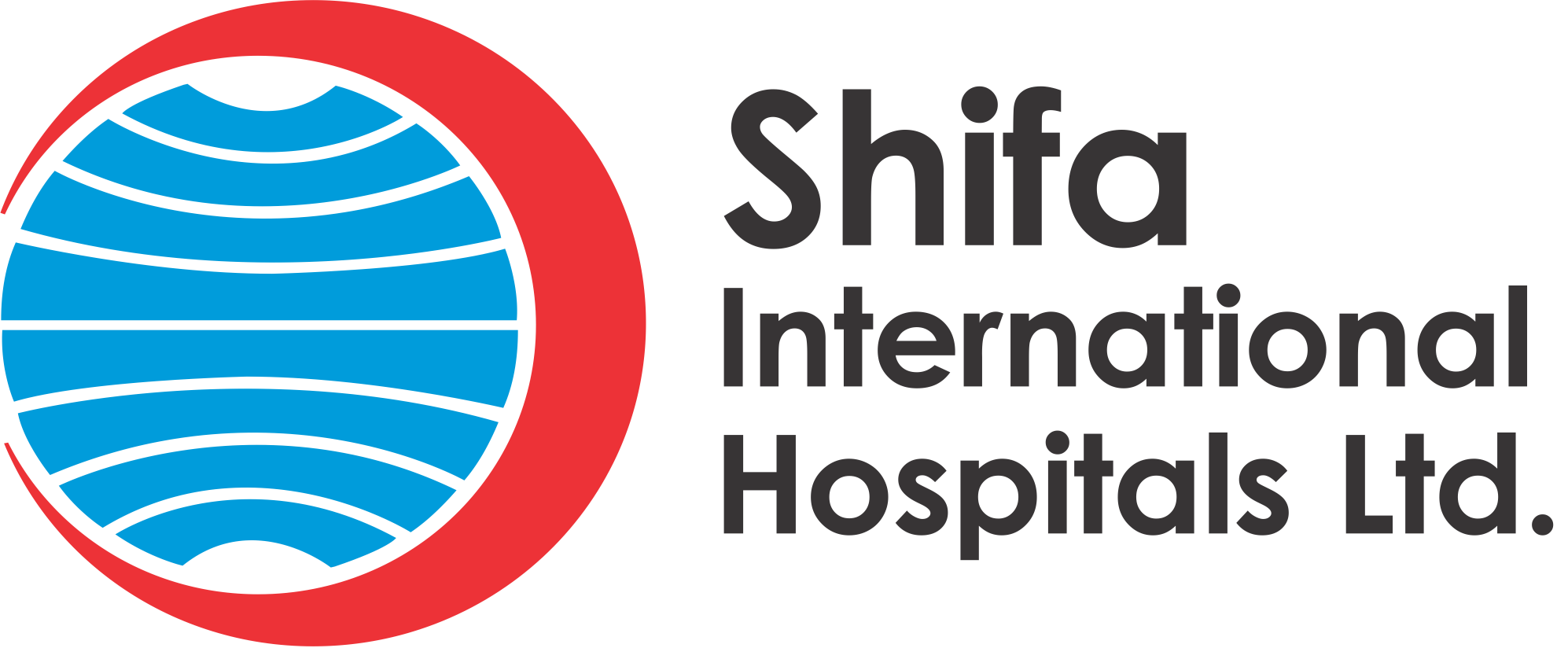

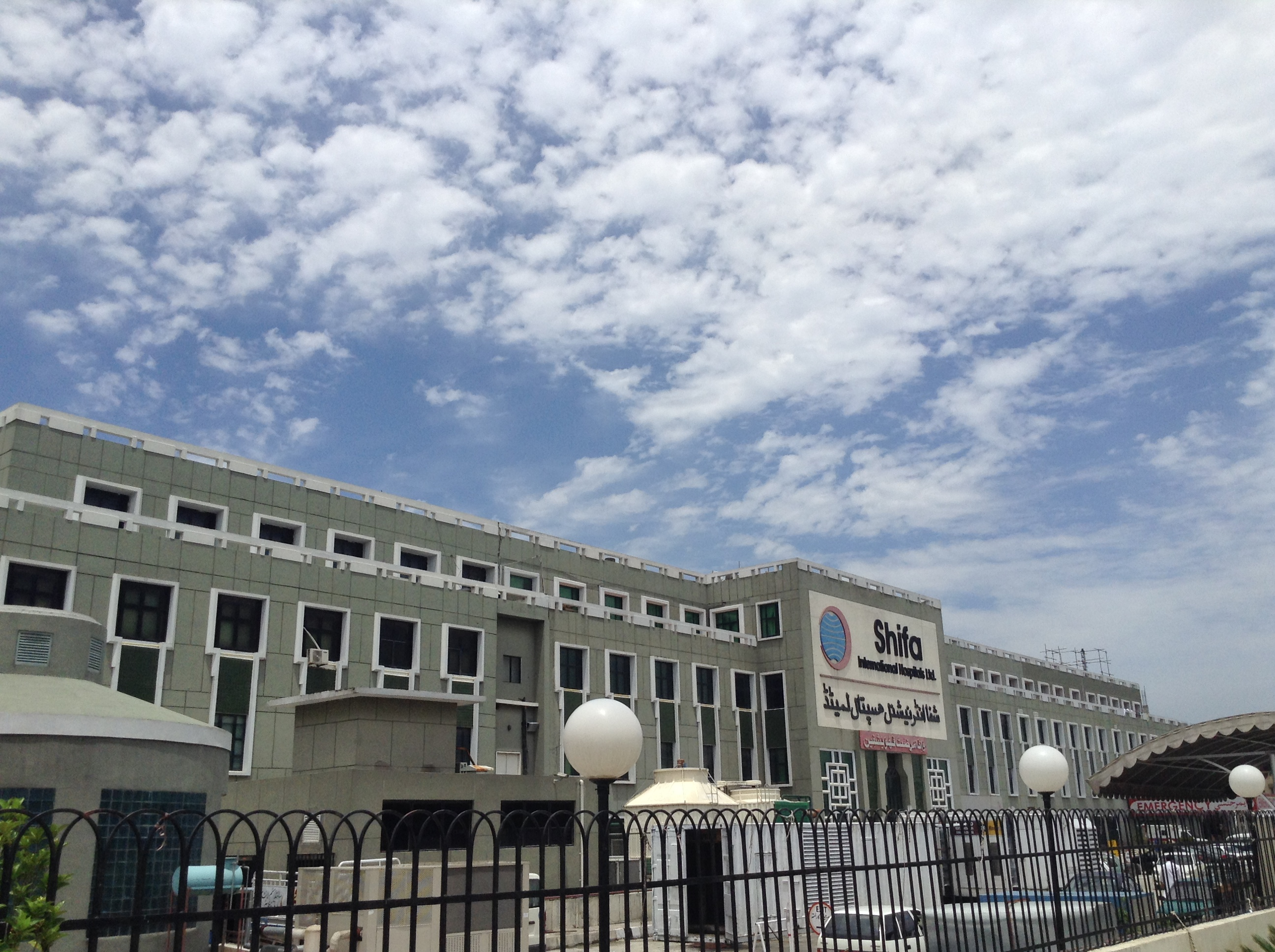
- Company type: Public
- Traded as: PSX: SHFA
- Industry: Healthcare
- Founded: 1993
- Founder: Zaheer Ahmad
- Headquarters: Islamabad, Pakistan
- Key people: Habib Ur Rahman (chairman); Zeeshan Bin Ishtiaque (CEO)
- Revenue: ▲ Rs. 27.967 billion (US$100 million) (2025)
- Operating income: ▲ Rs. 4.058 billion (US$15 million) (2025)
- Net income: ▲ Rs. 2.231 billion (US$8.0 million) (2025)
- Total assets: ▲ Rs. 25.009 billion (US$89 million) (2025)
- Total equity: ▲ Rs. 14.930 billion (US$53 million) (2025)
- Owner: Tameer-e-Millat Foundation (12.57%); International Finance Corporation (12%)
- Number of employees: 5,665 (2025)
- Subsidiaries: Shifa Neuro Sciences Institute Islamabad; Shifa National Hospital Faisalabad (61%); Shifa Medical Center Islamabad (56%); Shifa Development Services (55%); Shifa Care (50%)
- Website: shifa.com.pk
- Footnotes / references Financials as of 30 June 2025

Shifa International Hospitals Limited (SIH) is a Pakistani hospital network headquartered in Islamabad.

It runs two medical centers in Islamabad and another hospital in Faisalabad.

== History ==
Zaheer Ahmad, a Pakistani American medical doctor, is often credited as the founder of Shifa International Hospital. He also served as a chief executive at the hospital.

The Hospital was incorporated on September 20, 1987 as a private limited company. It was converted to a public limited company on October 12, 1989. The construction activity began in 1988. Shifa was officially opened in 1993, with 8 OPD clinics and 36 beds.

As of 2018, about 85% of the liver transplant operations in Pakistan were performed at SIH, of which 700 organ transplants were done successfully. In 2018, the hospital suspended the transplant program due to fraud alleged by a patient's family.

Shifa National Hospital Faisalabad, a subsidiary of Shifa International Hospital Limited, began its construction in 2022.

== Controversies ==
In a case involving alleged negligence, President Arif Alvi directed the Islamabad Healthcare Regulatory Authority (IHRA) to ensure that Shifa International Hospital in Islamabad reimbursed Rs. 2.9 million to the family of a patient who died during the course of treatment. Additionally, the President upheld the Rs. 900,000 fine imposed on the hospital. The investigation, prompted by a complaint from the patient's daughter, revealed the hospital's negligence, professional misconduct, and malpractice, leading to these actions being taken.

In a significant case, an Islamabad court issued arrest warrants for a former consultant at Shifa International Hospital, Dr. Aasim Rahman. The patient, Hajira Bibi, claimed the hospital failed to diagnose her real disease and accused them of maltreatment and misdiagnosis. After being diagnosed with leprosy at a different hospital, she sought a refund and compensation totaling Rs15.5 million from Shifa under Islamabad consumer law.

The Federal Investigation Agency (FIA) transferred a case to the Capital Development Authority (CDA) regarding Shifa International Hospital's alleged encroachment. The hospital was accused of violating building regulations in 2020 by encroaching on land near a nullah.

== See also ==
- Zaheer Ahmad
- Shifa Tameer-e-Millat University
- H-8, Islamabad
- Healthcare in Pakistan
