= Munni Begum =

Pakistani ghazal singer (born 1955)

Munni Begum منی بیگم
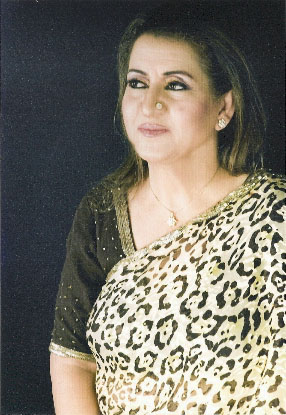

Background information
- Born: Nadira Begum; 1955 (age 70–71); Murshidabad, Bengal Presidency; British India
- Origin: Pakistan
- Genres: Ghazal
- Occupation: Ghazal singer
- Years active: 1976 – present

Nadira Begum (Urdu: نادرہ بیگم), better known by her pseudonym title, Munni Begum (Urdu: مُنّی بیگم) is a Pakistani vocalist and ghazal singer.

== Early life ==
Munni Begum was born Nadira Begum in Murshidabad (now in West Bengal, India) in 1946. She was the third of her parents' seven children. She first started taking music lessons from the famous singer Ustad Khwaja Ghulam Mustafa Warsi. It was this music teacher who gave her this professional name due to her small size and young age. Subsequently, she studied in the school of music for three years, and thereafter, she launched her career.

Her parents migrated from India to East Pakistan in the early 1950s. East Pakistan later became independent Bangladesh. She studied at PAF Shaheen School, Dacca; however, she moved to Karachi, West Pakistan, due to the Bangladesh Liberation War of 1971.

== Career ==
Munni Begum began her career as a singer in Karachi, Pakistan, in the 1970s. She released her first album of ghazals in 1976. Then she sang many more hit ghazals and thus became a renowned ghazal singer of Pakistan. In her news media interviews, she was always quick-witted and bold. Even though Urdu was not her mother tongue, she showed a remarkable talent for choosing ghazals with simple language. This was very effective and became one of the reasons for her popularity among common people. The other reasons for her popularity were that she had a voice characterized by its clarity and strength. In the 1980s, Munni Begum's rise coincided with the rapid growth of a then-new technology, the cassette tape. Cassette tape prices were cheap compared to the old technology of vinyl records. On top of that, Munni Begum had a rich voice with many shades. She also was a good harmonium player.

== Personal life ==
Munni Begum was married in the 1980s, which resulted in a divorce in 1998. She has two daughters, Muniba Hasnain and Minara Umer, and one son, Syed Mohammad Asad Ali. As of 2016, she lives in Chicago, United States, and does not perform regularly.

== Notable ghazals ==
As for Munni Begum's hit ghazals, the list is very long. Some of these are:

- Lazzat-e-Ghum Badhaa Dijeay
- Jhoom Barabar Jhoom Sharabi
- Har Qadam Zehmatein
- Tumhare Sheher Ka Mausam Bada Suhana Lage (lyrics by poet: QAISARUL JAFRI)
- Ek Bar Muskura Do
- Awaargi Mein Had Se Guzar Jaana Chahiye
- Chahat MaeN Kya Dunya Dari, Ishq MaeN Kaisi Majboori
- Bewafa Se Bhi Pyar Hota Hai
- Bhoolne Wale Se Koi Kehde
- Dil Ko Hale Karar Mein Dekha
- Kisi kay Gham May Waqar Khona
- Idhar Zindagi Ka Janaza Uthey Ga (lyrics by poet Tabish Dehlvi)
- Bhujhi Hoi Shama Ka Dhuaan Hun
- Mareez-e-Mohabbat Unhi Ka Fasana
- Laa Pilaade Saaqiya
- Yeh Hai Maikadah Yahan Rind Hain
- Jo fareb mein ne khaya tujhe razdan samajh kar
- Ay ishq hamen itna to bata anjam hamara kia ho ga
- Dil ki bat labon par la kar ab tak hum dukh sehtey hein
- Hum ne hasraton ke daagh aansuon se dho lie
- Merey saqia mujhe bhool ja
- Kab mera nasheman ahl-e-chaman
- Ay merey hamnashin chal kahin aur chal
- Asman se utara gia
- Hamee charagh ki lao hein
- Pyar ki mun mein jote jagae aik zamana beet gia
- Yeh sila mila he mujh ko teri dosti ke peechey
- Mein nazar se pee raha hoon yeh sama badal na jae
- Tum poocho aur mein na bataoon aisey tu halat nahin
- Josh darya mein tha kis qadar alaman
- Teri anjuman mein zalim ajab ehtamam dekha
- Sharab la sharab la
- Dekh kar dar-o-kahba ki ranginian
- Teri soorat nigahon mein phirti rahe
- Yahan tangi-e-qafas he
- Meri dastan-e-hasrat wo suna suna ke roey
- Botal khuli hey raqs mein jaam-e-sharab hey

== Discography ==
- Munni Begum Khoobsurat Ghazlein Vol 1
- Awargi Vol. 28
- Meri Pasand Vol. 1
- Meri Pasand Vol. 2
- Masti Mein Surahi Jhoomti Hai Vol. 1
- Masti Mein Surahi Jhoomti Hai Vol. 2
- An Evening With Munni Begum
- New Ghazals Vol. 26
- Munni Begum Vol. 21
- Munni Begum Vol. 20
- Sham-E-Ghazal
- Meri Pasand
- Munni Begum
- Munni Begum In Concert Vol. 4
- Munni Begum In Concert Vol. 3
- Munni Begum In Concert Vol. 2
- Munni Begum In Concert Vol. 1
- Intoxicating Munni Begum
- Munni Begum - Sentimental Collection

== Awards and recognition ==
- Pride of Performance Award (2008) by the Governor of Sindh on behalf of the President of Pakistan.

== See also ==
- Jigar Moradabadi
