= Sanzar Kakar =

American entrepreneur

- Born: Seattle, Washington, US
- Education: University of Pennsylvania; Warwick Business School
- Occupation: Entrepreneur
- Years active: 2009–present

Sanzar Kakar is an Afghan-American entrepreneur and business leader.

== Education ==
Kakar was born in Seattle, Washington and then attended elementary school at Beaconhouse Public School; middle school at Moundridge Middle School in Moundridge, Kansas; and high school at an international school. Kakar participated or organized a number of Model United Nations conferences around the world, including in Beijing, The Hague, Montreal, Washington, Berkeley and Sharm-e-Sheikh.

Kakar graduated from the University of Pennsylvania with a Bachelor of Science in engineering, majoring in computer science engineering and minoring in economics. Kakar worked in New Jersey and New York before moving to Kabul, Afghanistan. Kakar also completed a master's program at Warwick Business School, University of Warwick in Coventry, United Kingdom, graduating with a Master of Business Administration, focusing on entrepreneurship and finance.

Kakar has attended Executive Education programs including Harvard Business School's Owner/President Management (OPM) and the Harvard Leadership Program for Moore Global.

== Career ==
Kakar started with Merrill Lynch working as a Technology Analyst to develop software to automatically link to the New York Stock Exchange. In 2006, Kakar served as the Investment Associate and then Country Director for Acap Partners, venture capital fund. In 2007, Kakar was appointed as the Executive Advisor to the Attorney General on the United States Department of State funded Justice Sector Support Program. Kakar worked to reorganize the Attorney General's Office and created a criminal case management system spanning seven justice institutions. In late 2008, Kakar served as the Economic Adviser and then Deputy Team Leader for the United Kingdom Department for International Development funded Investment Climate Facility, where he developed operational and fiduciary requirements for the £60 million grant fund.

In 2009, Kakar founded AFS, which primarily provided taxation services to U.S. Government contractors. The firm was featured on BBC News with John Simpson. In 2013, the firm re-branded as Afghanistan Holding Group as it expanded into auditing, research, training and legal services. Kakar was featured in 2019 on the cover of Afghanistan's business magazine, Business DNA.

Kakar has spoken about the need for formal financial markets in developing countries, including at the American University of Afghanistan and at TEDx Kabul 2014. A feasibility study for capital markets was supported by the United States Department of Defense Task Force for Business and Stability Operations (TFBSO). Kakar has spoken about the business environment in Afghanistan, including once on National Public Radio with Tom Ashbrook and at TEDx Kabul 2016. Kakar is an advocate for increasing foreign direct investment to Afghanistan, calling for more stability and predictability in the regulatory environment.

Between 2015 and 2020, Kakar launched nine additional companies, including Mezan Ltd, Warzish Ltd, Zinzir Ltd, Afghanet Ltd and acquired BusinessDNA Magazine. In 2020, his accountancy company joined as a full member firm of Moore Global. Moore Global is a network of 30,000 professionals across 260 independent firms working in more than 100 countries. Kakar spoke at TEDx about his goal to combine these ventures to dramatically increase employment in developing countries.

After 15 August 2021, Kakar closed a number of businesses to focus on addressing the humanitarian crisis facing the middle east. Over 22.8 million Afghans were facing starvation, including 1 million children. Kakar's HesabPay offered a secure and vetted payment channel to get aid to those that needed it most due to banks de-risking Afghanistan.

In 2026, Kakar began the expansion of Hesab with the rollout of its global self-custodial wallet across Africa and the Middle East, in partnership with Visa International.

== Community service ==
- Code Weekend
- Startup Valley
- Startup Weekend
- Startup Grind
- Business Summit
- Founder Institute
- Rise Afghanistan
- Business Integrity Network
- American Chamber of Commerce

== Articles ==
- For Afghanistan Compliance Requirements"
- For Afghanistan Investment and Business Guide"
- For Doing Business in Afghanistan
- For American Bar Association
- For Afghan Zariza Articles
- For ACCA Magazine
- For American Business Council Dubai
- For Trade for Peace, Perspectives from Young Afghan Entrepreneurs

== Speeches ==
- TEDxShar e Naw, The Speed of Money
- TEDxShar e Naw, Integrity in Business for Success in this World and the Next
- TEDxShar e Naw, How to Earn Money without a Job in Afghanistan?
- TEDxKabul, Preventing the Collapse of Afghan Economy
- TEDxKabul, Why Afghanistan needs an exchange now
- TEDxDarulaman, How to create 600,000 jobs in 6 months in Afghanistan
- TEDxKabulUniversity, The Future of Afghanistan with AI
- Startup Grind Kabul, Sanzar Kakar at Kabul Afghanistan
- Starting Business in Afghanistan - Insights from Sanzar Kakar
- Where did HesabPay start from? Sanzar Kakar
- Returning from abroad to Afghanistan - Sanzar Kakar
- Financial services business leader - Sanzar Kakar
- Afghanistan Holding Group Tour with Sanzar Kakar
- Behind the Scenes of Success with Sanzar Kakar
- Sanzar Kakar: Trading is key to the Afghan spirit
- Learn from Leaders: Sanzar Kakar
- The Payments Revolution is Now
- Ecosystem Spotlight: HesabPay
- Part 1: Secrets of Business with Sanzar Kakar
- Part 2: Secrets of Business with Sanzar Kakar
- Part 3: Secrets of Business with Sanzar Kakar
- Part 4: Secrets of Business with Sanzar Kakar
- Part 5: Secrets of Business with Sanzar Kakar
