= Ashraf Shad =

Ashraf Shad (Urdu: اشرف شاد) is a Pakistani / Australian writer, poet and journalist. Ashraf was born in Moradabad, India, and migrated first to Pakistan after the Partition of India, and then to Australia in 1989. He has also lived in the United States, Hungary, UAE, Bahrain, Brunei, and Kuwait.

== Publications ==
- Problems of Reporting the Developing World: A case study of New York Time’s reporting on China (1992).
- Nisab, poetry collection (1996).
- Bewatan, a novel that won an award for the best novel in Pakistan (1997).
- Wazir-e-Azam, (The Prime Minister), political fiction (1999).
- Bewatan, a Hindi translation published (2001) Raj Kamal Publications, Delhi
- Shora-e-Australia (Urdu Poets of Australia), poetry compilation (2001).
- Aa Merey Qareeb Aa (Come close to me), poetry collection, (2003).
- Sadre Mohtaram, (The President) (2004).
- Peeli Lakeer (The yellow line), short story collection (2011).
- Ahmed Faraz Baqalam Khud, critical evaluation (2013) Dost Publications Islamabad
- Syasstein Kya Kya, interviews (2013) Dost Publications
- Akhbare Ishq, poetry collection (2013) Pakistani Adab Publications, Karachi
- Judge Saheb, novel (2017) Dost Publications Islamabad
- B A Rustam TV Anchor, novel (2018), Dost Publications
- Iskandar Mirza – memoirs, translation (2019) Varsa Publications Karachi
- Ashraf Shad – Fun Aur Shakhsiat by G N Qureshi, reviews (2013) Pakistani Adab Publications Karachi
- The Critical evaluation of Ashraf Shad's literary work, research thesis by Amna Chaudhry (2017) Pakistani Adab, Karachi
