= Jamaat ul-Fuqra =

Pakistani and U.S. Islamist organisation

- جماعة الفقراء
- Founded: c.1980
- Founder: Mubarak Ali Gilani
- Territory: Pakistan and the United States
- Membership: ≈3,000
- Activities: Assassination, bombing
- Allies: Salafi jihadism
- Notable members: Clement Rodney Hampton-El; Stephen Paul Paster

Jamaat ul-Fuqraa' (alternatively Jamaat al-Fuqraa'; Arabic: جماعة الفقراء, "Community of the Impoverished") is a Salafi jihadist organization mostly based in Pakistan and the United States. Some of the approximately 3,000 members have planned various acts of violence, often directed at rival factions. Two Al-Fuqra members were convicted of conspiring to murder Rashad Khalifa in 1990, and others are alleged to have assassinated Ahmadiyya leader Mozaffar Ahmad in 1983. It has been alleged that the groups Muslims of the Americas and Quranic Open University are the same as Jamaat ul-Fuqra, but this has not been confirmed. These allegations are primarily made by far-right organizations, many who believe the organizations are operating terrorist training camps in the United States. Muslims of America denies any connection.

The group is separatist, and was described by the National Memorial Institute for the Prevention of Terrorism (MIPT) and a similar profile in the database of the South Asian Terror Portal as a cult.

== Activities ==
Although various members have been suspected of assassinations and other acts of terror perpetrated in the 1980s and later, and some members having been charged with conspiracy to commit first degree murder and other crimes, with at least one conviction leading to a lengthy prison term. The Jamaat itself is not listed as a Foreign Terrorist Organization by the US or the EU. It was included in a list of terrorist organizations in Patterns of Global Terrorism, a 1999 report by the U.S. State Department.

The group has been banned in Pakistan. Jamaat ul-Fuqra was also involved in the planned bombing of a Hindu temple in Toronto, Canada in 1991.

=== Hotel Rajneesh bombing ===
On July 29, 1983, Stephen Paul Paster, a Jamaat member, set off a bomb at the Hotel Rajneesh, a hotel in Portland, Oregon, United States. The hotel was owned by the Rajneesh religious group and featured the Zorba the Buddha nightclub. Paster had several bombs and homemade napalm in his room, but one of the bombs went off in his hands while he was placing the bombs in the midst of the napalm.

Paster was almost immediately arrested after the bombs went off, as he was one of only two people injured in the explosion, which took place at 1:23 a.m. After the hotel was evacuated two other explosions occurred at 3 a.m. Paster was charged with arson due to the fire which resulted from the explosions. Paster posted $20,000 bail, then fled Oregon and was not apprehended until June 1984 in Englewood, Colorado. In November 1985, Paster was sentenced to 20 years in prison by a Multnomah County circuit judge.

== See also ==
- 1991 Toronto bomb plot
- United States v Burns
