= Sadia Shepard =

Pakistani American filmmaker and author

Sadia Quraeshi Shepard is a Pakistani American filmmaker and author. She is the author of The Girl from Foreign: A Search for Shipwrecked Ancestors, Lost Loves, and a Sense of Home, which was published by Penguin Press in 2008. Shepard is an assistant professor of film studies at Wesleyan University.

== Biography ==
Sadia Quraeshi Shepard is the daughter of an American father, architect Richard Shepard, and a Pakistani American mother, artist, designer and educator, Samina Quraeshi.

Sadia received a BA from Wesleyan University, where she studied with Jeanine Basinger, an MA from Stanford University and was a Fulbright Scholar to India in 2001. Shepard's writing has appeared in The Washington Post, The New York Times, The Forward, Wall Street Journal magazine, and The Indian Express. She has taught in the undergraduate creative writing program at Columbia University. She received an MFA in creative writing at Hunter College.

As of 2020, Shepard was a Kundiman fellow and had received writing residencies from the Vermont Studio Center and Yaddo. Through the Penguin Random House Speakers Bureau, she lectures on topics including the Jews of India, Growing up Interfaith, and Researching and Writing the Family Story.

== Film ==
Shepard produced R.J. Cutler's The September Issue, a documentary portrait of the making of Vogue, which won the Excellence in Cinematography Award at the 2009 Sundance Film Festival and the Audience Award at the 2010 Cinema Eye Honors.

In Search of the Bene Israel is an observational documentary she directed and produced, following modern descendants of the ancient Mumbai Jewish community, to which she is related on her mother's mother's side.

Her other credits as a producer include The Education of Muhammad Hussein for HBO, and In the Courtyard of the Beloved.

== The New Yorker controversy ==
On January 7, 2018, in a Facebook post, author Francine Prose accused Shepard of plagiarizing Mavis Gallant's "The Ice Wagon Going Down the Street", which had appeared in The New Yorker on December 14, 1963. Shepard's piece had been published online by The New Yorker and was scheduled for release in the January 8, 2018 issue. In a discussion with Deborah Treisman, published on The New Yorker's site on January 1, 2018, Shepard acknowledged the influence, stating that "This story owes a great debt to one of my favorite short-story writers, Mavis Gallant, and specifically to her story 'The Ice Wagon Going Down the Street'", adding that Gallant's piece "feels so Pakistani." Though Shepard's story reimagines the original in a new context, with added detail and altered character dynamics, Prose contended that the similarities between the two stories constituted theft, writing in her original post that the story is a "scene by scene, plot-turn by plot-turn, gesture by gesture, line-of-dialogue by line-of-dialogue copy—the only major difference being that the main characters are Pakistanis in Connecticut during the Trump era instead of Canadians in post-WWII Geneva." In a letter to The New Yorker, Prose maintained her original stance, asking, "Is it really acceptable to change the names and the identities of fictional characters and then claim the story as one's own original work? Why, then, do we bother with copyrights?" Responding to Prose's accusation, Shepard wrote, "In acknowledging the great debt to Gallant in my interview with my editor, my aim was to make my intentions clear: to use Gallant's story of self-exile in postwar Europe as a point of departure for an exploration of the immigrant experience of Pakistani Muslims in today's America. Prose's assertions reflect both a profound misrepresentation of my work and a refusal to acknowledge the central role that cultural identity plays in my story."

Shepard was defended by several writers, including Lincoln Michel, who wrote in Literary Hub that "An artform is a conversation between artists. Literature is a massive ballroom stretching through time in which authors debate, rebut, woo, and chat with each other." He lists J. G. Ballard, Angela Carter, Victor LaValle, Jean Rhys, and Nathan Englander as writers who, to various degrees, remixed and redefined stories that pre-existed their own. Writing for the Los Angeles Review of Books, Gina Apostol saw a more invidious explanation for Prose's reaction, stating that "Prose seems incapable of imagining an Asian-American writer would be [appropriating] strategically, purposefully." Further, she argued that reinterpretations of "a white-dominant text by a person of color" are important, and referred to such exercises as "intertextual couplings."

About the controversy, New York Times Magazine writer Ligaya Mishan wrote about the "long, honorable precedent for revisiting and recasting the work of fellow writers, communing and wrestling with predecessors and contemporaries alike....Shepard’s approach to Gallant, and the Western literary tradition, is thus more radical. As an outsider, she is refusing to “know her place” on the margins and is instead writing herself into the canon, making — taking — a space where none might otherwise be granted."

== Works ==
=== Books ===
- The Girl from Foreign: A Search for Shipwrecked Ancestors, Lost Loves, and a Sense of Home, Penguin Press, 2008. ISBN 9781843546054

=== Short stories ===
- "Monsters". Asian American Writers' Workshop. 23 October 2020.
- "Foreign-Returned". The New Yorker. 1 January 2018.
- "Kim's Game". The New Yorker. 19 January 2026.
