= Pakistan lobby in the United States =

Pro-Pakistan groups and individuals in the U.S.

The Pakistan lobby in the United States are the professional lobbyists paid directly by the government of Pakistan to lobby the public and government of the United States on behalf of Pakistani interests and/or on behalf of Pakistani American rights and interests.

== History ==
Stephen Payne is believed to be the preeminent paid lobbyist for the government of Pakistan in the U.S. According to former Pakistani President Pervez Musharraf, Payne played a pivotal role in U.S.-Pakistan relations, serving as Pakistan's lobbyist through a group called Team Eagle (also known as Team Barakat). Payne worked as a lobbyist for Pakistan to deliver a multibillion-dollar U.S. aid package and to remove U.S. economic and military sanctions against Pakistan that had been in place for several years. He also helped Pakistan secure Major non-NATO ally status, which Pakistan received in 2004 as well as helping to secure F-16s, C-130s and military helicopters for Pakistan.

Pakistan has paid lobbyists to obtain “Reconstruction Opportunity Zones,” industrial development zones with the privilege of exporting goods manufactured in Pakistan duty-free to the United States and to maintain high levels of U.S. foreign aid.

Pakistan has sought to furthen its foreign policy interests in the United States through lobbying. In one particular incident in March 1997, the member of the House of Representatives from Indiana Dan Burton was accused of demanding a $5,000 contribution from a Pakistani lobbyist. The lobbyist said that when he was unable to raise the funds, Burton complained to the Pakistani ambassador and threatened to make sure "none of his friends or colleagues" would meet with the lobbyist or his associates.

The lobbying firm Janus-Merritt Strategies led by Iranian-American lawyer David Safavian was also registered by the Pakistani government for lobbying. Safavian was subsequently convicted of a Federal felony in the Jack Abramoff Indian lobbying scandal and served a one-year sentence in Federal prison.

In 2011, the FBI arrested Syed Ghulam Nabi Fai, a U.S. citizen of Kashmiri origin, on charges of secretly lobbying for the Government of Pakistan seeking to influence decisions made in the US regarding the Kashmir conflict, and receiving illegal funding totaling over $4,000,000 from the Inter Services Intelligence agency of the Pakistani Military. Fai's passport has been surrendered to the Court and he is currently under house arrest, with strict security conditions including electronic monitoring via an ankle bracelet. Media reports have revealed that Fai has reportedly confessed, under interrogation, to the charges. He faces a sentence of up to 5 years for this Federal felony. Until 2007, Cassidy & Associates lobbied for Pakistan.

From 2008 to 2013, the Pakistan Peoples Party (PPP) government in Pakistan engaged Locke Lord Strategies, the lobbying division of Locke Lord law firm, at a monthly rate of $75,000 to represent Pakistan's interests in the United States. The contract involved Mark Siegel, a partner at Locke Lord and personal friend of former Prime Minister Benazir Bhutto.

Locke Lord was tasked with advocating for Pakistan on Capitol Hill and engaging with the U.S. media, though reports indicated limited effectiveness in these areas. According to U.S. Justice Department records, the firm earned approximately $4.5 million for its services. Prior to the contract, Siegel had lobbied pro bono for an international investigation into Bhutto's assassination and served as a paid lobbyist for the PPP between 1986–1988 and after 2008.

In July 2019, the Government of Pakistan contracted Holland & Knight for public policy strategy services. Tom Reynolds, a former congressman and senior policy advisor at the firm, led the development of this strategy under a one-year contract valued at $1.1 million.

In 2023, in response to the crackdown on former Prime Minister Imran Khan, Pakistani-American advocacy groups were mobilizing members of the US Congress to issue statements against human rights abuses in Pakistan, further estranged the bilateral relationship. In October 2024, the Islamabad Policy Research Institute, a state-funded think tank, engaged Team Eagle Consulting for lobbying services. Led by Stephen Payne, the firm was hired to counter the growing influence of Imran Khan lobby in the U.S. Team Eagle Consulting receives $1.5 million annually, equivalent to $125,000 per month, for its services.

== See also ==
- Baloch Council of North America
- Pakistan–United States relations
