= Zaheer Ahmad =

Pakistani medical doctor (1948–2011)

Zaheer Ahmed
- Born: 17 October 1948
- Died: 7 October 2011 (aged 62); Jhang, Pakistan
- Education: University of the Punjab
- Occupation: Medical doctor

Zaheer Ahmad (Urdu: ظہیر احمد) was a Pakistani American medical doctor who was credited as being the founder and chief executive of the Shifa International Hospitals in Islamabad. In 2011, he came under media attention when the United States accused him of being an associate of Dr. Syed Ghulam Nabi Fai, a lobbyist from Kashmir and founder of the Kashmir American Council (KAC) who was charged for covertly attempting to lobby and influence the American government on the Kashmir conflict on behalf of the Government of Pakistan's interests (see Pakistani lobby in the United States).

== Education and career ==
Born in 1948, Ahmed obtained a master's degree in pharmacy from the University of Punjab in Lahore and later became a doctor of medicine after pursuing studies in internal medicine from abroad. Apart from the Shifa Foundation, Ahmad also founded the Tameer-e-Millat Foundation, a non-government organisation (NGO) aimed at uplifting education.

== Lobbying efforts ==
The Federal Bureau of Investigation (FBI), after detaining and interrogating Syed Ghulam Nabi Fai charged Ahmad for having involvement with Fai in the scandal. However, Ahmad was living in, Islamabad, Pakistan at the time and was not apprehended by U.S. authorities. The FBI maintained that the two had been participating in a long-term conspiracy to act as agents of the Pakistani government in the United States without disclosing their affiliation, which is illegal. Thus, both potentially faced a sentence of five years in prison if convicted. Referring to Ahmad's shady contacts, one article published in the Indian newspaper Hindustan Times even alleged that Ahmad was present during the much-publicised nuclear scientist Sultan Bashiruddin Mahmood's alleged meeting with Osama bin Laden in Afghanistan one month prior to the September 11 attacks; it said that Ayman al-Zawahiri was also present at the meeting and that the discussion revolved around "building a nuclear bomb." However, this allegation has never been proven or validated.

According to U.S. government officials, Fai and Ahmad lobbied for the Kashmir cause secretly rather than making a formal declaration, as is required legally per the Foreign Agents Registration Act. It was claimed that the Pakistani Inter-Services Intelligence (ISI) used Ahmad, who had contacts with the agency, as a channel through which they used to transfer large funds of money to Fai.

== Death ==
On 7 October 2011, local media reported that Ahmad had died in Islamabad at the age of 63 due to brain haemorrhage. He left behind a widow and four children. His funeral was attended by many prominent politicians and bureaucrats and the salat al-Janazah (funeral prayer) was led by Qazi Hussain Ahmed. The News International remarked that the country had been deprived of a patriot "who inspired a revolutionary change in the private health care sector of Pakistan through his stellar accomplishments."
