= Islamabad Healthcare Regulatory Authority =

Pakistani government health body

- Abbreviation: IHRA
- Formation: 2018; 8 years ago
- Founded at: Islamabad, Pakistan
- Type: Government body
- Legal status: Active
- Purpose: Enforcement of providing quality healthcare service standards
- Location: Islamabad
- Region served: Pakistan
- Chairman: Dr Riaz Shahbaz Janjua
- Website: ihra.gov.pk

Islamabad Healthcare Regulatory Authority (IHRA) is a government health regulatory body, with its head office based in Islamabad, Pakistan. It is enacted under the Islamabad Health Regulation Act, 2018. It provides licensing to healthcare establishments to focus on the enforcement of providing quality healthcare service standards (QHSS).

== History ==
IHRA was established in 2018 under the Islamabad Health Regulation Act, 2018.

Dr Syed Fazle Hadi was appointed as the IHRA board chairman and Dr Syed Ali Hussain Naqvi as the CEO.

In April 2021, Hussain Naqvi was removed as the CEO after being charged of misconduct and abusing his authority.

In October 2024, The government announced to merge the Ministry of Health bodies, the Islamabad Blood Transfusion Authority and the Human Organ Transplant Authority, into IHRA.
