= Shahbaz Khan (hydrologist) =

Australian climatologist and hydrologist

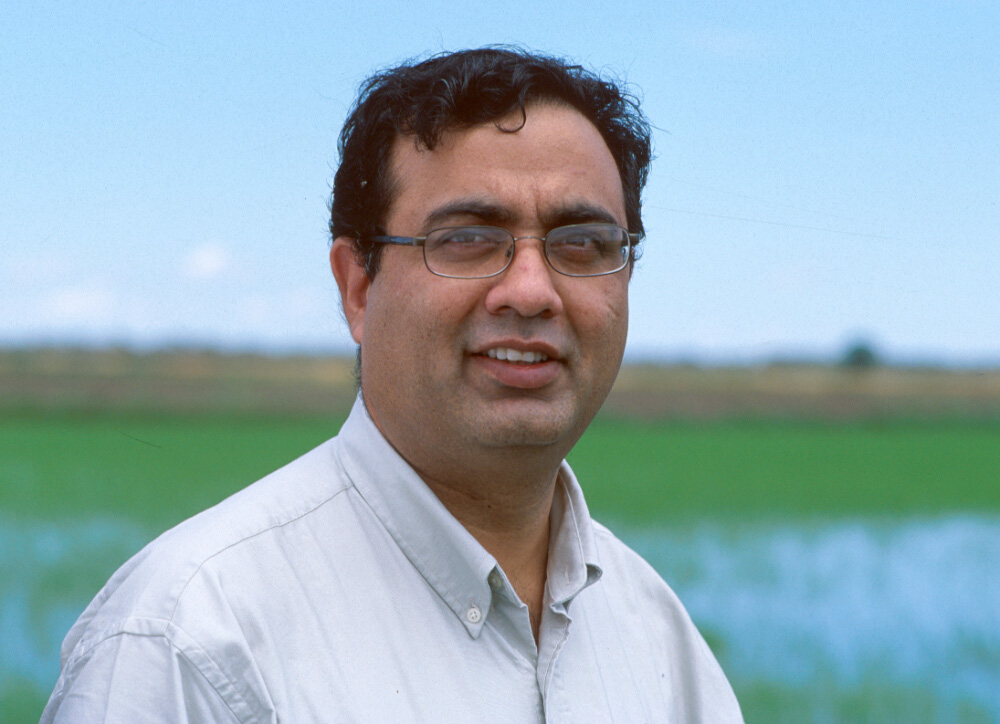
Shahbaz Khan

Shahbaz Khan (born in Jhelum, Pakistan) is an Australian climatologist and hydrologist, who has worked extensively for UNESCO and also advised governments and universities on issues related to the climate and water management.

== Career ==
Khan has advised the Australian government on water management programs, such as the Prime Minister's 2007 rural water security plan. He coordinated multidisciplinary research programs under the Australian Cooperative Research Centre initiative.

Khan was previously Professor of Hydrology and Director of the International Centre of Water at the Charles Sturt University, Australia, and Research Leader/Director of Irrigated Systems and Rural Water Use areas of CSIRO Australia. He was also part of the team who developed a computer-based early warning system for floods in Pakistan, known as the Flood Early Warning System (FEWS).

Khan developed the SWAGMAN series of mathematical models of irrigation, drought management, groundwater flow and contaminant transport and surface-groundwater interactions.

He is currently Director of the UNESCO Cluster Office in Beijing serving Democratic People’s Republic of Korea, Japan, Mongolia, the People’s Republic of China and the Republic of Korea. Previously he was Director of Cluster Office in Jakarta and the Regional Bureau for Science in Asia and the Pacific, served as UNESCO Representative to Indonesia, Brunei Darussalam, Malaysia, the Philippines and Timor Leste. In his previous role at UNESCO he was Chief of Section on Sustainable Water Resources Development and Management at UNESCO in Paris. His work at UNESCO includes the Water Education for Sustainable Development, Hydrology for Environment, Life and Policy (HELP), Ecohydrology, Water and Ethics, Energy and Food Nexus within the International Hydrological Programme (IHP). He advises UN member states on environmental policies, review of curricula, and securing multilateral support for research and education projects especially in the Asia-Pacific region.

== Awards and recognition ==
- Member of the Australian Prime Minister's Vision 2020 Team.
- Australian Eureka Award.
- Australia-New Zealand Modelling and Simulation Society Biennial Medal, 2007.
- Charles Sturt University's Vice Chancellor's Research Excellence Award 2006.
- In 2016, he was awarded an Honorary Doctorate in Environment and Development by Universiti Kebangsaan Malaysia (UKM) for his work on water, environment and sustainable development.
- On 14 December 2018 he received a Doctor of Science honoris causa (DSc) from the University of Birmingham for his contributions to solving global water and environmental management problems.
