= East–West University =

University in Chicago, Illinois

Coordinates: 41°52′17″N 87°37′28″W

East-West University
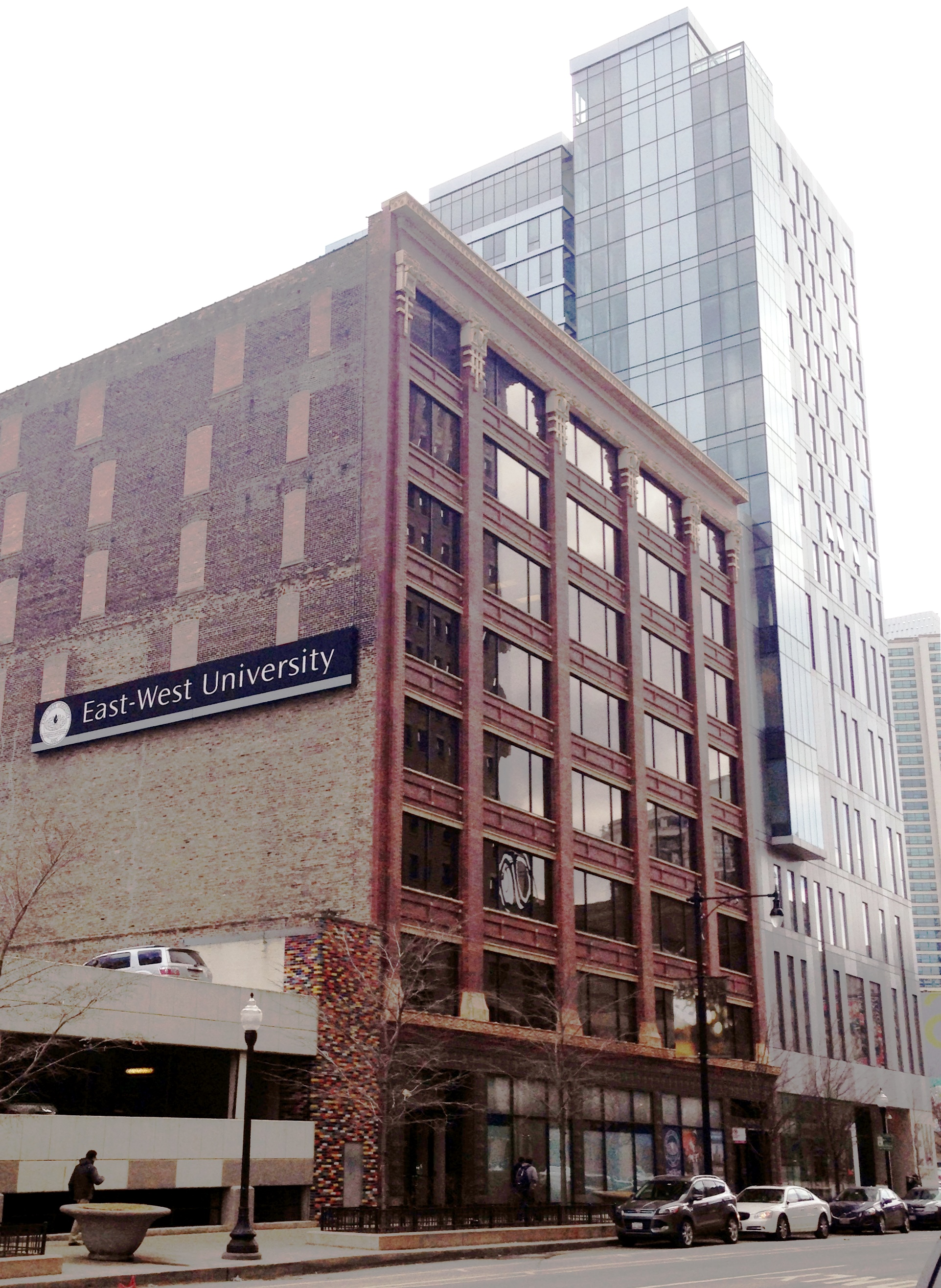
- The Loftrium, or "West Building," and Student Life Center, at 819 and 829 S. Wabash Avenue
- Motto: Excellence and Service
- Type: Private liberal arts college
- Established: 1980
- Chancellor: M. Wasiullah Khan
- Location: Chicago, Illinois, United States
- Campus: 1 acre (0.40 ha); Urban
- Colors: Blue and Gold
- Nickname: Phantoms
- Sporting affiliations: USCAA
- Website: www.eastwest.edu

East–West University is a private liberal arts college in Chicago, Illinois, United States. It was founded in 1980 and offers associate and bachelor's degrees. The institution is accredited by the Higher Learning Commission.

== Buildings ==
The institution is housed in three buildings connected by bridges.

- The East Building at 816 S. Michigan was the original home of the institution when it opened on September 5, 1980. It currently houses the mathematics and science departments.
- The Loftrium Building, also known as the West Building, at 819 S. Wabash Avenue was acquired in 1999. This is where the majority of the English and Business course are conducted.
- In 2014 the institution opened its Student Life Center at 829 S. Wabash, which connects to the Loftrium. The 17-story building was designed by the firm of Holabird & Root and includes an auditorium, gym and dormitory space for 220 students.
- The Flats at East–West University offers student housing attached to other East–West University buildings.

== Media ==
Beginning in 2016, east–west began publishing its own student newspaper The Phantom Press, which has published quarterly since its inception. The paper is made up of writing submissions from students and alumni, highlights of events in the surrounding area, tips for adjusting to campus life and profile pieces on various faculty members.

== Athletics ==
At present, East–West offers an intercollegiate basketball team known as the East-West Phantoms for both men and women. They are coached by Tommie Posley. EWU is a member of the United States Collegiate Athletic Association (USCAA) and competes as an independent outside of an athletic conference. In addition to other USCAA teams, the Phantoms routinely play NCAA and NAIA competition.

== Student loan debt ==
According to a non-comprehensive survey, in December 2014, East–West University had the second lowest average student loan debt per graduate in the United States. Only one American university was ranked above it, City University of New York. East–West University has the lowest tuition of all private schools in Chicago and the surrounding area. Additionally, 97% of admitted students receive some amount of financial aid.

== Economic and gender diversity ==
The median family income of East–West University students is $24,200 in 2017.

In 2016, the student body and gender ratio was as follows:

- Women 54.0%
- Men 46.0%
- Total number of undergraduate students: 419

As of 2025, the student body and gender ratio is 53% male and 47% female. The total number of undergraduate students is 528 https://waf.collegedata.com/college-search/east-west-university
