= Stephen Paster =

Alleged member of the Jamaat ul-Fuqra

Stephen Paul Paster (born November 1948) is an American from Bronx, New York who has been widely alleged to be a member of the Jamaat ul-Fuqra.

On July 29, 1983, Paster planted and exploded three pipe bombs at the Hotel Rajneesh, a Portland, Oregon hotel then owned by followers of the Bhagwan Shree Rajneesh. The attack caused $180,000 in damages to the property and severely injured Paster. Though Paster was arrested for the attack, he fled Oregon after being released on bail posted by his wife. The following June he was arrested in Englewood, Colorado and returned to Oregon to face trial for arson. Convicted, Paster was sentenced to 20 years imprisonment for his role in the bombing but was released after serving four years.

Following his release from prison, Paster moved to Lahore, Pakistan and allegedly began teaching "advanced training courses" in guerilla warfare.

In addition to the Portland attack, Paster was a leading suspect in two 1984 bombings of Hindu and Vedanta religious sites in Seattle.

Paster is a convert from Judaism to Islam.
