= Wasiullah Khan =

Mohammad Wasiullah Khan is the founder and chancellor of East–West University, a private, non-profit, non-denominational college based in Chicago's South Loop neighbourhood. He is also a veteran of the Pakistani educational system, working in the mid-to-late 1950s in Government College, Sukkur, Pakistan.

== Education and career ==
Wasiullah Khan, a Pakistani-American, got his MA and MEd Honors degrees from the University of the Punjab and PhD in Educational Administration from Indiana University Bloomington. He had been a teacher and administrator in Pakistan before he came to Berkeley, California in the 1970s. He has been an educational researcher in Indiana and became an Academic Dean in a minority college in Chicago.

In November 1978, he held the convention of a planning group to establish a new, multi-cultural institution of higher learning in Chicago. In September 1980, after approvals from the state and federal agencies, East–West University started operations as a not-for-profit institution in Chicago.

In April 2000, East–West University acquired an 8-storey building as an extension of its campus. Fall 2003 student enrollment at the university was over 1000.

Wasiullah Khan was the President of Pakistani American Congress from 2005 to 2007.

== Books ==
Wasiullah Khan contributed to and edited a book, published by Hodder & Stoughton, Kent, United Kingdom. He wrote an extensive introduction in this book: Education and Society in the Muslim World.
