= Samina Quraeshi =

- Notable work: Legacy of the Indus; Lahore: the City Within; Legends of the Indus; Sacred Spaces: A Journey with the Sufis of the Indus

Samina Quraeshi (1944-2013) was a Pakistani-American educator, designer, artist and author.

== Life ==
Quraeshi was raised in Karachi, Pakistan and later lived in Massachusetts.

She is the mother of Sadia Shepard, an author and filmmaker, and Cassim Shepard, a New York-based town planner.

== Work ==
As an author she took inspiration from the Sufi tradition of the Indus Valley. She wrote the following books:

- Legacy of the Indus
- Lahore: the City Within
- Legends of the Indus
- Sacred Spaces: A Journey with the Sufis of the Indus (published by Peabody Museum Press in 2009)
- Reimagining West Coconut Grove: Landmarks
