= List of Aga Khan University people =

This is a list of notable alumni, professors and staff affiliated with the Aga Khan University.

== Government, public service, and public policy ==
- Prof. Abdul Gaffar Billoo - Pakistani pediatric endocrinologist at Aga Khan University
- Sahabzada Yaqub Khan - former foreign minister of Pakistan

== Notable alumni ==
- Adil Haider - trauma surgeon and outcomes research scientist in the United States
- Naeem Rahim - nephrologist and founder of the Idaho-based JRM Foundation for Humanity
