= Timothy M. Pawlik =

American oncologist

- Born: Methuen, Massachusetts, USA

Academic background
- Education: BS, 1991, Georgetown University; MD, 1995, Tufts University School of Medicine; MPH, 1995, Tufts University School of Medicine; MTS, 2000, Harvard Divinity School; General Surgery Residency, 2002, University of Michigan; Surgical Oncology Fellowship, 2005, M.D. Anderson Cancer Center; PhD, 2012, Johns Hopkins University; MBA, 2022, Ohio State University
- Thesis: Management of colorectal liver metastasis: understanding shifting treatment strategies (2012)

Academic work
- Institutions: Ohio State University Wexner Medical Center; Johns Hopkins University

Timothy Michael Pawlik is an American surgical oncologist. He is the Chair of the Department of Surgery and the Urban Meyer III and Shelley Meyer Chair for Cancer Research at Ohio State University and Surgeon-in-Chief at the Ohio State University Wexner Medical Center.

== Early life and education ==
Pawlik was born in Methuen, Massachusetts to parents Michael and Carmen. While growing up in Lawrence, Massachusetts, he attended St. John's Preparatory School.

After earning his BSc, he went on to earn both a Medical Degree and a Masters of Public Health. During his General Surgery Residency, he also earned his Masters of Theological Studies, with an area of concentration in Bioethics and a Certificate in Science and Religion: Religion and Bioethics.

Following two years as a surgical oncology research fellow at Massachusetts General Hospital, Pawlik went on to complete a Surgical Oncology Fellowship. He was drawn to cancer because cancer runs in his family.

During subsequent years while working as a surgical oncologist, Pawlik also earned a Ph.D. in Public Health, as well as an Executive MBA.

== Career ==
Clinically, Pawlik's focus is on alimentary tract surgery, particularly hepatic, pancreatic and biliary diseases. He also has an interest in medical ethics. Upon completion of his surgical training and fellowships, Pawlik joined the faculty at Johns Hopkins University as an associate professor for the School of Medicine and co-director of the Center for Surgical Trials and Outcomes. While overseeing the Johns Hopkins Liver Tumor Center, he was appointed the new director of surgical oncology at the Johns Hopkins University School of Medicine. He later served as the John L. Cameron, M.D., Professor of Alimentary Tract Diseases. During these years, he was a frequent national and international lecturer on management of hepatobiliary malignancies, as well as an executive council member of the Society of Surgical Oncology, American Hepato-Pancreato-Biliary Association, and the Association for Academic Surgery. While at Johns Hopkins, Pawlik was awarded honorary memberships in the Royal Australasian College of Surgeons and the Brazilian Society of Surgical Oncology.

Pawlik eventually left Johns Hopkins in 2016 to become Chair of the Department of Surgery and the Urban Meyer III and Shelley Meyer Chair for Cancer Research at Ohio State University and Surgeon-in-Chief at The Ohio State University Wexner Medical Center. In addition, he is Secretary/Treasurer for OSU Physicians, Inc., a multi-specialty physician’s group.

Since joining Ohio State, Pawlik has been awarded honorary memberships in Mexican Association for Surgery of the Alimentary Tract, and the Society of General Surgeons of Perú. He has been listed as a “Top Doctor” by U.S. News and World Report, Newsweek, Castle Connolly and local publications in both Baltimore and Columbus.

Beyond his immediate institutions, Pawlik has given over 300 invited talks both nationally and internationally in 25 different countries and has served as past-President of the Association for Academic Surgery, past-President of the Americas Hepato-Pancreato-Biliary Association, as well as President of the Association for Academic Surgery Foundation and the 2021-22 co-President of the Surgical Biology II Club. Additional memberships include the American Surgical Association; Society of Surgical Oncology; Society of Surgery of the Alimentary Tract; the Halsted Society; and the Society of Clinical Surgery.

== Research and publications ==
Pawlik’s research focuses on determinations of factors associated with prognosis and staging of gastrointestinal cancers, as well as the economics of cancer care. In addition, he studies patient/physician communication and patient engagement, patient perception of cancer-care goals, and the social determinants associated with receipt and outcomes following cancer care.

After discovering that no single institution had treated enough patients with bile duct cancer to collect sufficient data on this rare disease, Pawlik pooled data from researchers and doctors around the world to better guide care and provide treatment options. Using this data, he and his research team helped establish the system of bile duct cancer stages now used around the world to designate how advanced the cancer has become.

Pawlik has authored or co-authored more than 2,210 articles, published over 100 book chapters and edited 14 surgical textbooks. He has also been Deputy Editor of the journal JAMA Surgery, co-Editor-in-chief of the Journal of Gastrointestinal Surgery and Associate Editor for Annals of Surgical Oncology.

== Personal life ==
Pawlik and his wife, Megan, have four children together.
