= Adeel A. Butt =

Pakistani-American infectious diseases physician and professor

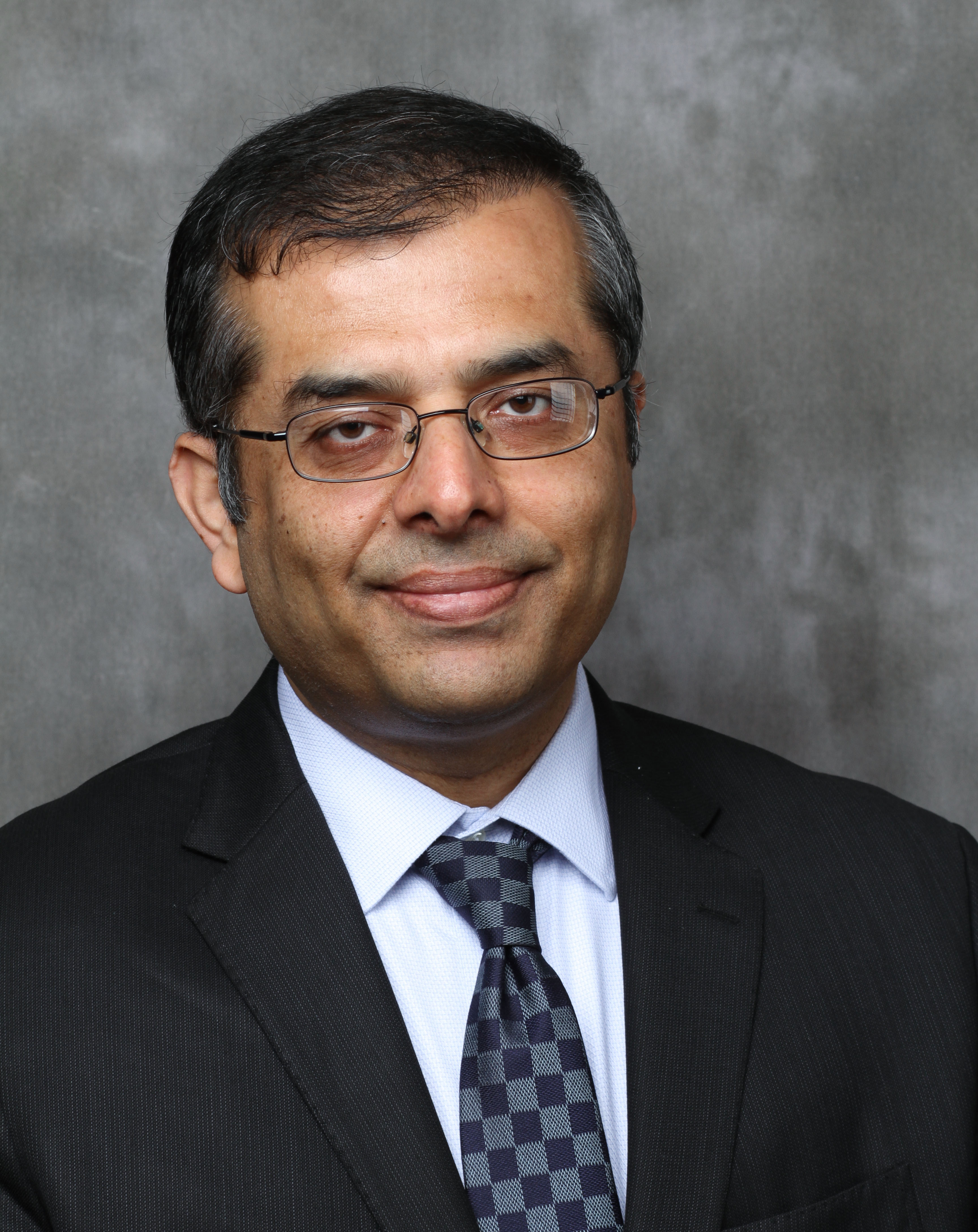
- Butt in 2022
- Education: Aga Khan University (M.B.B.S.); University of Pittsburgh School of Medicine (M.S and Certificate in Clinical Research); Mount Sinai School of Medicine (Internal Medicine Residency); LSU Health Sciences Center New Orleans (Infectious Disease Fellowship)
- Occupation: Physician-scientist

Adeel Ajwad Butt is a Pakistani–American infectious diseases physician, Professor of Medicine and Population Health Sciences at the Weill-Cornell Medical College He is also the founder president and CEO of Innovations in Healthcare Advocacy, Research and Training (I-HART),

== Early life and education ==
Butt obtained his MBBS from The Aga Khan University and then moved to the U.S. to pursue his postgraduate studies. He completed his residency in Internal Medicine at the Mount Sinai School of Medicine affiliated hospitals in New York and then a fellowship in Infectious Diseases at the LSU Health Sciences Center New Orleans in New Orleans. He also holds a Certificate in Clinical Research and a Master of Science degree in Clinical Effectiveness and Health Services Research from the University of Pittsburgh School of Medicine in 2006.

== Career ==
Butt held the position of Chair of Medicine at Sheikh Khalifa Medical City, Abu Dhabi, UAE (SKMC). Subsequently, he was appointed as the first Chief Quality Officer(I) at Hamad Medical Corporation (HMC) and the inaugural Director of Hamad Healthcare Quality Institute in Qatar. Adeel Butt has provided advice and training to numerous governments, non-governmental organizations, and academic health systems across the globe. He served as a member of the Board of Governors in National Institute of Health Pakistan (2021–2024) and a member of several advisory committees at the Ministry of Public Health in Qatar. He serves on the advisory board of Infectious Diseases Society of America (IDSA) Global Health Taskforce and as Chair of International Advisory Panel for Electronic Health Record (EHR) implementation at the Aga Khan University over 4 countries. He is also a life member of the Association of Physicians of Pakistani Descent of North America (APPNA), where he has been a pioneer of numerous programs and initiatives.

Butt served as the Program Director for the International Scholars Program at the University of Pittsburgh Medical Center from 2003 to 2011.

== Research ==
Butt's early research focused on hepatitis C virus(HCV) infection and HIV coinfection and emerging infectious diseases of global importance. He was also involved in National Institutes of Health sponsored AIDS Clinical Trials Network, where he was a member of the Viral Hepatitis Transformative Science Group and led several key clinical trials. More recently his research focus has been on Emerging Infectious Diseases and antimicrobial resistance. In 2018 he led the care and investigation of MERS-CoV outbreaks in the UAE and served as a WHO consultant for this infection. He also led an initiative studying the evolving antimicrobial resistance in the UAE and its impact upon clinical outcomes.

Butt has been actively involved in the COVID-19 pandemic response and COVID-19 research in Qatar and in the United States and has published more than 90 key papers on this topic. He is also leading key clinical trials to streamline appropriate use of antibiotics in both inpatient and outpatient settings.

== Awards and recognition ==
- Member, Board of Governors, National Institutes of Health, Pakistan, 2021-2024
- Recipient of Pakistan Society of Hepatology Distinguished Academics Award in 2020
- Hamad Medical Corporation, Qatar, Research Excellence Award in 2018
- Hamad Medical Corporation Excellence in Health Services Research Award in 2015
- Fulbright Scholar in 2009
- Yale-Johnson & Johnson Scholar in International Health in 2006
- US Department of State International Education Award in 2006
- Florida Sea Grant Faculty Award in 2006
- Outstanding Research Award in 2003
