= Junaid Abdul Razzak =

Junaid Abdul Razzak is a Pakistani-American physician, academic, and global emergency care expert and researcher, living in New York City.

== Early life and education ==
Razzak earned his Bachelor of Medicine, Bachelor of Surgery (MBBS) from Aga Khan University Medical College in Karachi, Pakistan, in 1994. He completed his residency in emergency medicine at Yale New Haven Hospital, Yale University, United States. He later obtained a Ph.D. in Public Health from the Karolinska Institute in Sweden in 2005.

== Professional career ==
Razzak serves as the Vice Chair of Research at Weill Cornell Medicine in New York.

He is the founding Director of the Centre of Excellence for Trauma and Emergencies (CETE) at AKU.

He was the director of the Center for Global Emergency Care and professor of emergency medicine and international health at the Johns Hopkins University School of Medicine.

He was the CEO of Aman Health Services.

Razzak was the founding chair of Emergency Medicine at Aga Khan University and directed the WHO Collaborating Center on Emergency Medicine and Trauma. He also led the NIH Collaborative on Emergency Care Research (CLEER) in low- and middle-income countries.

In 2005, he established the first emergency medicine service (EMS) training program in Pakistan.

His focus has been on innovative way to deliver emergency care particularly in settings with little resources.

In 1999, Razzak was awarded the Best Trainee award by the State of Connecticut.

In 2025, Razzak was awarded the Public Health Leadership Award by the Society of Academic Emergency Medicine.
