= Summer Haven, Florida =

- Unincorporated community
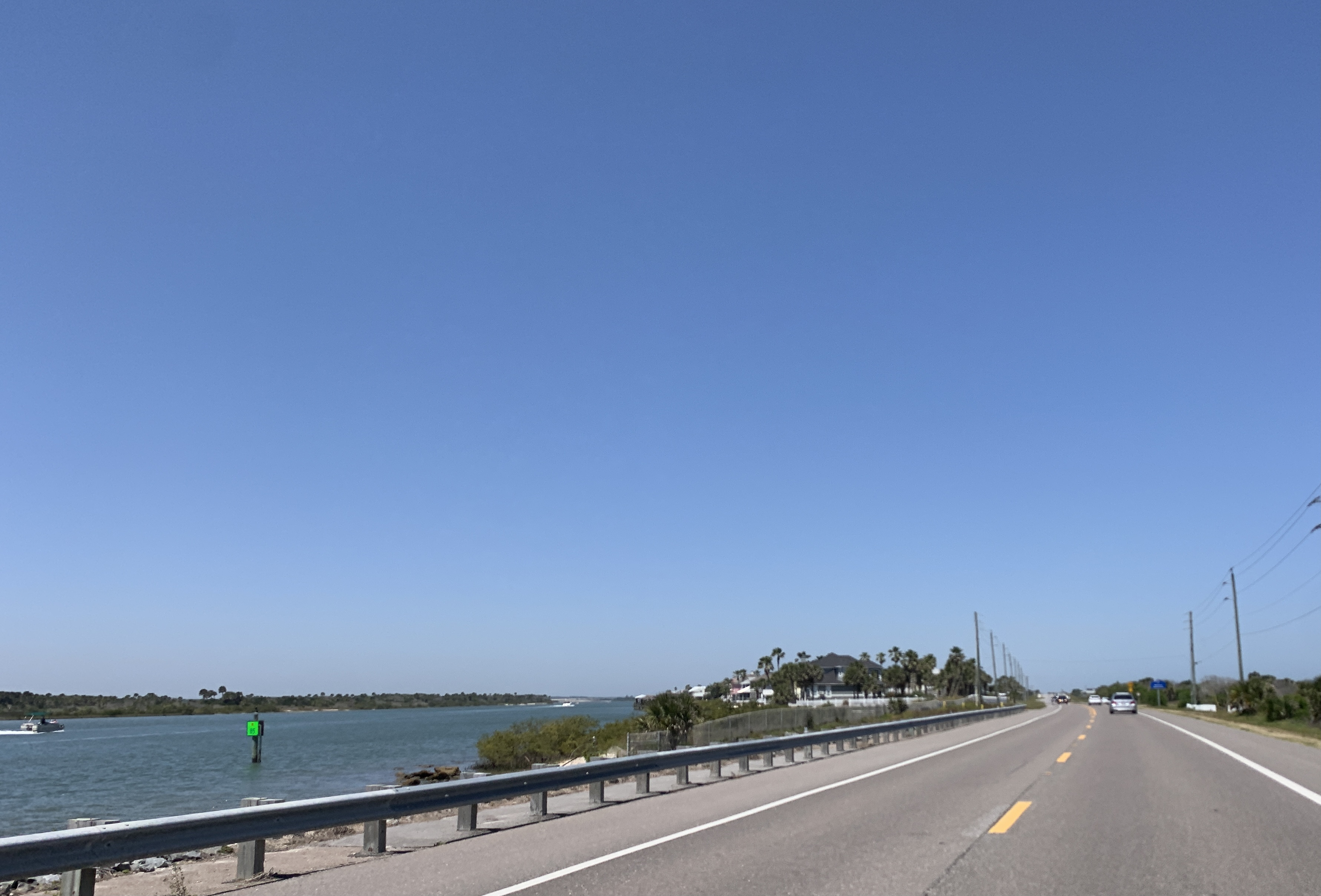
- Interactive map of Summer Haven, Florida
- Coordinates: 29°41′57″N 81°13′24″W
- Country: United States
- State: Florida
- County: St. Johns
- Elevation: 0 ft (0 m)
- GNIS feature ID: 308140

Summer Haven is an unincorporated community in southeast St. Johns County, Florida, United States, located just south of the Matanzas Inlet, on a narrow strip of land between a shallow marsh and the Atlantic Ocean.

Summer Haven is a small beach resort which began with cottages used by farmers. It consists of approximately 60 structures, mostly single family homes.

Around 1890, Thomas A. Mellon started vacationing in Summer Haven. Eventually the community attracted other well known people, including Cornelius Vanderbilt Whitney, Owen D. Young, and author Marjorie Kinnan Rawlings.

After severe nor’easters in 1962, Summer Haven was declared a disaster area, and the U.S. Army Corps of Engineers constructed an 1,800-foot granite revetment along the northern portion. After Hurricane Dora in 1964, the existing revetment, which fronts the majority of the upland development in the reach, was extended by an additional 1,070 linear feet. South of the revetment, development is limited to one row of single-family residences. When possible, St. Johns County has been purchasing structures and lands in this southern area and not allowing further development.

Hurricane Matthew in 2016, destroyed the existing revetment. FEMA and St Johns County decided to rebuild and extend the revetment. Construction began in the Summer of 2020 and finished in June 2025.

== Road access ==
Until the construction of the Old A1A road in the 1920s, Summer Haven was only accessible by boat, or by driving along the beach. Because this section of Florida State Road A1A washed out frequently during storms, it was moved inland in the 1970s after Hurricane Dora, and the Old A1A became a county road.

The road was rebuilt after washouts caused by Hurricane Jeanne in 2004, and Tropical Storm Fay in 2008. Local residents filed suit to ensure ongoing maintenance of the road by the county, and a decision was issued on May 20, 2011. Attorney Thomas Ruppert of the Florida Sea Grant and Peter Byrne of Georgetown University have expressed concerns about the broader consequences of the precedents set by this case, which may enable more affluent property owners to sue in order to fund rebuilding on the grounds that engineers have failed to anticipate sea level rise. The precedents set have the potential to direct public funding towards expensive, unrealistic projects, and away from coastal mitigation measures for less affluent communities.
