= Melina Kibbe =

American clinician, scholar, and academic administrator

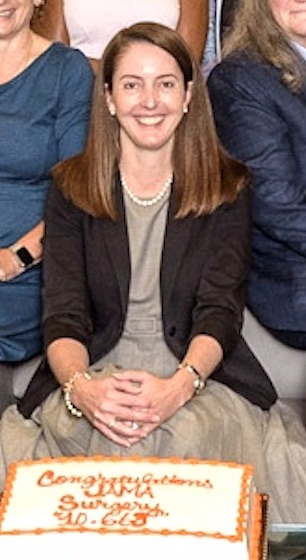
- Kibbe in 2018

7th President of the University of Texas Health Science Center
- Incumbent
- Assumed office 2025
- Preceded by: Giuseppe Colasurdo

Personal details
- Born: La Jolla, California, U.S.
- Spouse: Marco Patti (m. 2013)
- Education: University of Chicago (BA, MD)

Melina R. Kibbe is an American clinician and researcher in the field of vascular surgery. She is the seventh president of the University of Texas Health Science Center at Houston. She previously served as Dean of the University of Virginia School of Medicine.

Prior to her appointment at Virginia, she held the Colin G. Thomas Jr. Distinguished Professorship and Chair of the Department of Surgery at UNC School of Medicine. Kibbe is also the editor-in-chief for the journal JAMA Surgery and past president for the Association for Academic Surgery, Midwestern Vascular Surgical Society, and the Association of VA Surgeons. Kibbe's research interests focus on nitric oxide vascular biology and the development of novel and innovative nitric oxide-based therapies for patients with vascular disease.

== Early life and education ==
In her freshman year of high school, Kibbe was diagnosed with scoliosis and underwent surgery to have a Harrington rod implanted. While earning her bachelor's degree at the University of Chicago, she decided to become a surgeon. She earned her Medical Degree from the Pritzker School of Medicine and completed her residency at the University of Pittsburgh Medical Center.

In 2019, Kibbe was the recipient of a Distinguished Service Award from her alma mater, the University of Chicago.

== Career ==
=== Feinberg School of Medicine ===
Kibbe joined the faculty at Feinberg School of Medicine in 2003 after completing a fellowship in vascular surgery at Northwestern Memorial Hospital.

She was encouraged to stay following her one-year residency so she could be mentored by Bill Pearce. As an assistant professor of surgery, Kibbe conducted research on how to extend the effectiveness of vascular procedures with limited durability until she was approached by Teresa Woodruff to use a gendered angle in her studies. Upon agreeing, she began a new study to examine whether her therapy produced different results in male and female animals.

In 2010, Kibbe was honored with the Presidential Early Career Award for Scientists and Engineers by President Barack Obama for "her innovative research in the field of nitric oxide vascular biology and the development of novel translational therapies for patients with vascular disease." Following this, Kibbe was appointed to various administrative positions including co-chief of the vascular surgery service at the Jesse Brown VA Medical Center, president-elect for the Midwestern Vascular Surgical Society and the Association of VA Surgeons. She also served as an associate editor of the Journal of Surgical Research and a distinguished reviewer for the Journal of Vascular Surgery.

While serving in her role as the Edward G. Elcock Professor of Surgical Research and professor in surgery-vascular, she also received an Excellence in Teaching award from the Department of Surgery. In 2014, Kibbe was named editor-in-chief of the scientific journal JAMA Surgery. Prior to leaving for the University of North Carolina at Chapel Hill, she was also the recipient of the 2016 Tripartite Legacy Faculty Prize in Translational Science and Education.

=== UNC ===
In 2016, Kibbe accepted a leadership role at the University of North Carolina at Chapel Hill; chair of the Department of Surgery and the Zach D. Owens Distinguished Professor. Upon accepting her appointment, she became the 15th woman in the country to become chair of a department of surgery and the first female chair of the department at the University of North Carolina at Chapel Hill. She was subsequently elected a Member of the American Society for Clinical Investigation and to the National Academy of Medicine (NAM). Her election to the NAM was recognition of her "outstanding professional achievement and commitment to service."

While at UNC, Kibbe continued to collaborate with Woodruff to study gender differences and help implement a new policy regarding sex bias and flaws in research at the National Institutes of Health (NIH). The new change dictated that every research grant submitted at the NIH must include sex as a variable.

In 2017, as the Colin G. Thomas Distinguished Professor, Kibbe was honored with the Dr. Rodman L. Sheen and Thomas G. Sheen Award by the American College of Surgeons for her advancements in the study and science of medicine. The following year, she was the recipient of an NIH R01 award from the National Heart, Lung, and Blood Institute for her project "A Novel Endovascular Approach to Remove Atherosclerotic Plaque Lesions in Situ." Two years later, Kibbe's work was recognized with the Presidential Citation from the Association of VA Surgeons for her "outstanding contributions made to further the well-being of veterans of the United States of America." She also won the American Medical Student Association's Women Leaders in Medicine Award and the Spring 2019 Clinical Scientist Award from the Department of Veterans Affairs.

=== UVA ===
In July 2021, Kibbe was named as the Dean of the University of Virginia School of Medicine. She officially began her tenure in September 2021, succeeding David S. Wilkes in the role. Under her leadership, the University of Virginia School of Medicine experienced significant growth in research, the clinical enterprise, and fundraising, with record-breaking years reported during her tenure. In recognition of her contributions, she was named to the Virginia Business 2023 Women in Leadership list.

In 2024, Kibbe was nominated to serve as Secretary of the American Surgical Association, the oldest surgical organization in the United States, which includes many of the nation’s and the world’s leading surgeons among its members. In 2025, she received the Professional Achievement Award from the Alumni Board of the University of Chicago in recognition of her leadership and contributions to academic medicine.

=== UT Health Science Center at Houston ===
In July 2025, Kibbe stepped down as Dean of UVA after it was announced she was the sole candidate for the president of the University of Texas Health Science Center at Houston. She began her tenure at UTHealth on September 9, 2025.

=== JAMA Surgery ===
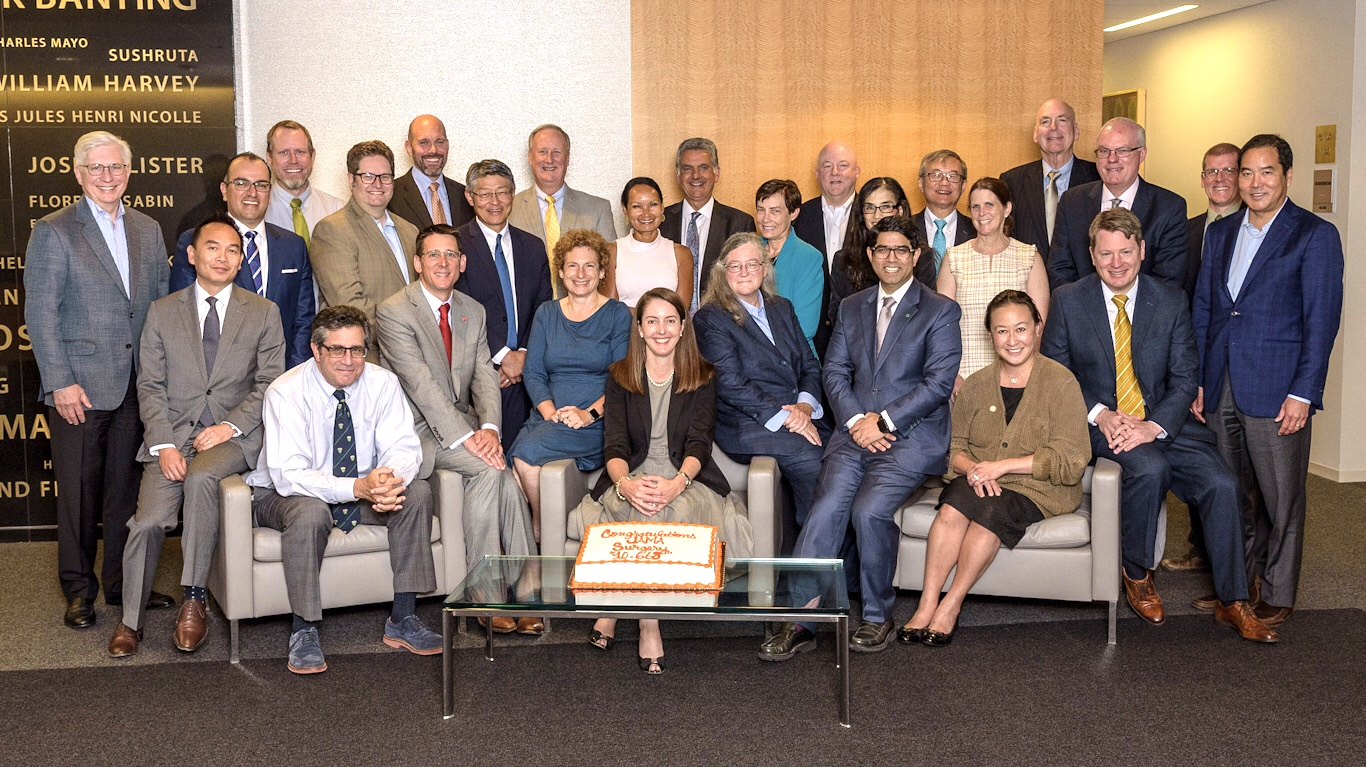
The editorial board of JAMA Surgery celebrates its 2018 ranking as the top surgery journal in the world; Melina R. Kibbe, MD, editor-in-chief, seated at center.

In 2015, Kibbe was appointed Editor-in-Chief of JAMA Surgery, a peer-reviewed journal published by the American Medical Association. She succeeded Julie Ann Freischlag in this role. Under Kibbe’s leadership, JAMA Surgery celebrated its 100th anniversary in 2020, marked by an editorial co-authored by Kibbe and Howard Bauchner, Editor-in-Chief of JAMA. The journal had previously been known as Archives of Surgery before it was rebranded as part of the JAMA Network in 2013. During Kibbe’s tenure, JAMA Surgery achieved the highest impact factor of any surgery journal worldwide, reaching 16.681 in 2021. The journal first broke into double digits in 2018. By 2021, the journal recorded over 3.8 million web sessions and 4.7 million article views/downloads annually, reflecting its global reach during Kibbe's leadership.

== Personal life ==
Kibbe married Marco Patti on July 5, 2013 at the Chicago Cultural Center.
