= Adil Haider =

Pakistani–American trauma surgeon, innovator, and academic leader

- Born: August 27, 1973 (age 53); Zanesville, Ohio, U.S.
- Education: Aga Khan University (M.B.B.S., 1998); Johns Hopkins Bloomberg School of Public Health (M.P.H., 2000); New York Medical College (Surgical residency, 2000–2005)
- Occupations: Trauma surgeon; Public health researcher; Academic leader; Tech entrepreneur
- Known for: Research on racial disparities in trauma care; Dean of AKU Medical College (2018–2025); Founder of Boston Health AI
- Awards: Ellis Island Medal of Honor (2017)

Adil Haider (born August 27, 1973) is a Pakistani–American trauma surgeon, public health researcher, and health-tech entrepreneur. He is best known for pioneering research on racial disparities in trauma care, leading major academic institutions in the United States and Pakistan, and founding Boston Health AI, an artificial intelligence company advancing global healthcare accessibility. In 2017, he received the Ellis Island Medal of Honor for his medical and humanitarian contributions.

== Early life and education ==
Haider was born in Zanesville, Ohio, to Pakistani parents who had migrated to the United States in the 1960s and later returned to Pakistan. He attended St. Patrick's High School in Karachi and earned his M.B.B.S. degree from Aga Khan University in 1998. He received an M.P.H. from the Johns Hopkins Bloomberg School of Public Health in 2000 and completed a general surgery residency at New York Medical College (2000–2005), followed by fellowships in surgical critical care (2006) and trauma and acute care surgery (2007) at Johns Hopkins University.

== Technology and innovation ==
Following two decades of surgical and academic leadership in the United States and Pakistan, Haider co-founded Boston Health AI in 2024, a health technology company dedicated to redefining healthcare delivery through artificial intelligence. Its flagship product, Hami, launched in 2025 in collaboration with Systems Limited and C10 Labs, is described as an AI-powered physician's assistant designed to automate documentation, analyze diagnostics, and support clinical decision-making. The platform was initially deployed in Pakistan, with the goal of scaling access to care globally; the company states an ambition to improve care for one billion people worldwide.

== Medical and academic career ==
=== Early U.S. appointments (2007–2014) ===
From 2007 to 2014, Haider served as a trauma and acute care surgeon at Johns Hopkins Hospital. He directed the Center for Surgery Trials and Outcomes Research (CSTOR) and held a joint appointment as Associate Professor of Surgery, Anesthesiology, and Critical Care Medicine at Johns Hopkins University.

=== Academic leadership in the United States (2014–2018) ===
In 2014, Haider was appointed Kessler Director of the Center for Surgery and Public Health (CSPH) at Brigham and Women's Hospital and Harvard Medical School, where he led multidisciplinary teams focused on trauma systems, surgical quality, and health equity. He also served as Director of Disparities and Emerging Trauma Systems at Brigham and Women’s Hospital and held national leadership roles, including President of the Association for Academic Surgery (2019) and Deputy Editor of JAMA Surgery.

=== Dean of Aga Khan University Medical College (2018–2025) ===
In 2018, Haider became the first AKU MBBS graduate to be appointed Dean of the Medical College at Aga Khan University in Karachi, Pakistan. During his six-and-a-half-year tenure, AKU reported growth in research funding, publications, academic programs, and faculty development, and he helped lead the institution’s response to the COVID-19 pandemic and 2022 Pakistan floods. He completed his term in 2025 and continues to serve at AKU as Professor of Surgery and Director of the Centre for Clinical Best Practices.

== Research ==
Haider is widely recognized for pioneering work documenting racial disparities in trauma outcomes in the United States. He has authored or co-authored hundreds of peer-reviewed publications spanning trauma surgery, surgical outcomes, and health equity, and has mentored numerous trainees in the U.S. and Pakistan. He has served in leadership roles in professional societies and on editorial boards, including as Deputy Editor of JAMA Surgery.

== Professional appointments ==
- Founder, Boston Health AI (2024–present)
- Dean, Medical College, Aga Khan University (2018–2025)
- Professor of Surgery and Director, Centre for Clinical Best Practices, Aga Khan University (2025–present)
- Director, Disparities and Emerging Trauma Systems, Brigham and Women’s Hospital (2018–present)
- Kessler Director, Center for Surgery and Public Health, Harvard Medical School (2014–2018)
- Associate Professor, Johns Hopkins University School of Medicine (2011–2014)
- President, Association for Academic Surgery (2019)
- Deputy Editor, JAMA Surgery (2015–present)

== Awards and honors ==
- Ellis Island Medal of Honor (2017)
- Diversity Leadership Award, Johns Hopkins University (2014)
- Joan L. and Julius H. Jacobson II Promising Investigator Award, American College of Surgeons (2013)
- International Surgical Week First Prize, IATSIC (2013)
- C. James Carrico Fellowship, American College of Surgeons (2011)

== See also ==
- Health disparities in the United States
- Trauma surgery
- Artificial intelligence in healthcare
