= John Harland Bryant =

American physician

- Born: March 8, 1925; Tucson, Arizona, U.S.
- Died: July 5, 2017 (aged 92); Charlottesville, Virginia, U.S.
- Other names: Jack
- Education: Columbia University
- Occupation(s): Physician and professor
- Employers: Department of Health and Human Services; Columbia University; Aga Khan University, Pakistan
- Known for: Contribution to Public Health
- Notable work: Health & the Developing World
- Board member of: Christian Medical Commission of the World Council of Churches; Hôpital Albert Schweitzer, Haiti; International Organizations of Medical Sciences
- Spouse: Nancy Bryant
- Parent(s): William Harrison Bryant II and Mayche Peggs
- Awards: Life Time Achievement Award for Excellence in International Health 2000; Gordon Wyon Award 2011

John "Jack" Harland Bryant (March 8, 1925 – July 5, 2017) was an American physician.

== Early life and education ==
He attended 32 schools before entering high school. During World War II he served as a pilot in the Navy. Following the war he pursued a pre-med program of study at the University of Arizona, earning a B.A. degree in 1949 before enrolling at the Columbia University College of Physicians and Surgeons where he got his MD degree in 1953.

== Career ==
He completed an internship and residency in medicine at Presbyterian Hospital in New York City and decided on an academic career. His first job was a postgraduate research position at the National Institutes of Health. Following a fellowship in biochemistry at the National Institute of Arthritis and Metabolic Diseases and a special research fellowship in biochemistry at the Max Planck Institute for Biochemistry in Munich, Dr. Bryant took a fellowship in hematology at Washington University in St. Louis.

In 1960, he joined the medical faculty of the University of Vermont and served as director of the clinical research program and later as assistant dean in charge of undergraduate education.
His life changed when he was invited to help the Rockefeller Foundation with a study of health in the developing world. In 1969 Cornell University Press published his first book "Health & the Developing World".

Dr. Bryant's landmark assessment of the problems and vast inequities in health care delivery in the world's less economically favored nations. The book's systematic approach, fair assessment, and stark conclusions stunned many of its readers and helped inspire an entire generation of students in public and international health.

Following the completion of his study, the Rockefeller Foundation arranged for him to write up the results in Bangkok, Thailand, where he was appointed professor of medicine at the Ramathibodi Hospital Faculty of Medicine and where he simultaneously served as a consultant on medical education to the government of Thailand.

In Thailand Dr. Bryant shifted his focus from clinical medicine to the business of teaching health to people at the community level and reaching populations that weren't served. He helped establish a program in community medicine, in the process helping Thailand transform its medical education programs.

Meanwhile, "Health & the Developing World" brought him to the attention of the Columbia University administration. In 1971, he was named Joseph DeLamar Professor of Public Health, director of the School of Public Health, and Associate Dean of the Faculty of Medicine (Public Health). During his tenure at the helm, with Rockefeller and Carnegie Foundation support, Dr. Bryant created the Center for Community Health Development to help foster a more fluid and effective interaction among the medical school, Presbyterian Hospital, the community, and smaller hospitals and health care centers in the community. With the goal of breaking through institutional barriers to reach out to the community, he developed interdisciplinary programs with Columbia's business and social work schools.

In 1978, Dr. Julius Richmond, U.S. Surgeon General under President Jimmy Carter, invited him to expand the activities of the Office of International Health and increase its effectiveness in linking the United States with international health activities.

As director of the office and deputy assistant secretary for international health in the Department of Health and Human Services from 1978 to 1983, Dr. Bryant represented the U.S. government on the executive board of the World Health Organization (WHO) and participated in a number of joint US-WHO activities, including the development of the WHO Code on Infant Formulas.

In 1978 Dr. Bryant served as a member of the U.S. delegation to the International Conference on Primary Health Care in Alma Ata, Kazakhstan, then a part of the USSR. The first international gathering to recognize the need to reach out beyond existing hospital structures, Alma Ata affirmed that "no one would be left out." Its very name became a catchword for the fundamental doctrine of "health for all."

In 1985, his input was sought in the creation of Aga Khan University in Karachi, Pakistan. What began as a consultancy blossomed into an appointment. Dr. Bryant was named Noordin M. Thobani Professor and founding chairman of the Department of Community Health Sciences, a position he held until 1993, when he retired as emeritus professor. In the course of those eight years, Dr. Bryant helped design the curriculum and build the faculty of what became the university's largest department.

Dr. Bryant has been a member of the Institute of Medicine of the National Academy of Sciences; he served a tenure as chairman of the Christian Medical Commission of the World Council of Churches, advising that group on how best to continue to participate in health-care delivery in newly independent African states. He helped the council shift its focus from an exclusive dependence on mission hospitals.

As a member since 1982 and president since 1990 of the Council for International Organizations of Medical Sciences, he helped organize a number of international conferences on health policy, ethics and human values, and various aspects of the international pharmaceutical industry. This role has led to many cooperative efforts with the Islamic Organization for Medical Sciences, to which he was a trusted adviser.

Since the mid-1970s, he has served as a consultant to, and subsequently joined the board of, Hôpital Albert Schweitzer in Haiti.

In 1998, Dr. Bryant engaged in co-organizing a WHO conference in Geneva on equity in health-care delivery. This work expanded into a series of workshops on the ethics of health-care delivery, sponsored by the Rockefeller Foundation, and workshops were held in Pakistan, Thailand, Mexico, and Colombia.

He helped the government of Thailand cope with a serious "brain drain" of its physicians from rural to urban areas. He helped create and taught at the Tropical Institute for Community Health and Development for Africa in Kisumu, Kenya, and lent his guidance to students and faculty in the development there of community-based Orphan Care Support Systems. Among other projects, he is participated in an effort to develop the Pakistan-India Forum for Health and Well-Being as a binational health research collaboration in the interest of peace.

Recipient in 2000 of the Life Time Achievement Award for Excellence in International Health of the American Public Health Association and in 2001 of an honorary doctorate of science degree from the University of Arizona. He is author or co-author of multiple books and monographs.

== Retirement ==
He lived in a retirement community in Charlottesville, Virginia. Each summer, he worked in Kenya, teaching in Kisumu at the Tropical Institute for Community Health and Development. He also worked with UN Habitat, Nairobi, on the problems of Aids Orphans and Vulnerable Children in the Urban Slums of Africa.

In 2011 he received the Gordon Wyon Award from the American Public Health Association for his outstanding contribution to Community-Based Public Health.

Bryant died on July 5, 2017, in the retirement community of Westminster Canterbury of the Blue Ridge, Charlottesville, Virginia aged 92.
