= Saad Omer =

Epidemiologist

Saad B. Omer is an epidemiologist who currently serves as the founding dean of the School of Public Health at UT Southwestern Medical Center. Educated at the Aga Khan University Medical College and later at Johns Hopkins University, Omer's research includes studies of vaccines and immunization across Asia, Africa, North America, and Oceania. Before becoming a dean at UT Southwestern, he held appointments in the public health schools of Emory University and Yale University. He became a member of the American National Academy of Medicine in 2022.

Omer has stated he has "been working in public health since the age of 19". He received his MBBS degree from the Aga Khan University Medical College in Karachi, Pakistan, and later received MPH and PhD degrees from Johns Hopkins University in Baltimore, Maryland, US. From 2000 to 2008, Omer was employed as a faculty member of the Johns Hopkins Bloomberg School of Public Health. He became an assistant professor at the Emory Rollins School of Public Health in 2008, and became an associate and full professor in 2013 and 2015, respectively. He was endowed William H. Foege Professor at the time of his move to Yale in 2019.

Starting in 2019, Omer served as the inaugural director of the Yale Institute for Global Health, a joint venture between the Yale School of Medicine and School of Public Health. While at Yale, he held appointments in the university's medicine, nursing, and public health schools, and directed the institute through its response to the COVID-19 pandemic. In 2020, Omer was quoted in multiple news outlets, including The Washington Post, The Wall Street Journal, and The New York Times, as an expert on vaccines and herd immunity. He shared his concerns of vaccine hesitancy and advocated for communication efforts to raise awareness of the pandemic's impacts. He also supports advance planning of vaccine allocations so states are more prepared in the event of another pandemic. He had previously received media coverage for his studies on exemptions to measles and whooping cough vaccine requirements and the prevalence of vaccine refusals in the US. In 2019, Omer spoke as a witness to the U.S. Senate Committee on Health, Education, Labor and Pensions hearing entitled "Vaccines Save Lives". In 2021, he again served as a witness on the topic of vaccines, this time in a testimony to the House Energy and Commerce Committee.

Omer left Yale in 2023 to become Lyda Hill Dean of the Peter O'Donnell Jr. School of Public Health at UT Southwestern Medical Center. As the founding dean of UT Southwestern's public health school, the first class of MPH students matriculated under his leadership. His deanship has included recruiting new faculty members and positioning the school with an influence on "public health policy and clinical practice". He retains appointments as an adjunct professor at both Johns Hopkins and Emory.

Omer has received multiple awards for his work, including the 2009 Maurice R. Hilleman Early-Stage Career Investigator Award from the National Foundation for Infectious Diseases for his work on maternal immunization and election to the National Academy of Medicine. He is a former trustee of the Sabin Vaccine Institute, and currently sits on the board of Gavi, the Vaccine Alliance.
