= Aga Khan University Hospital, Kampala =

- Aga Khan University and Aga Khan Fund for Economic Development
- Location within Kampala

Geography
- Location: Nakawa, Kampala, Central Region, Uganda
- Coordinates: 00°19′30″N 32°36′50″E

Organisation
- Care system: Private
- Type: Tertiary, Referral, Teaching
- Affiliated university: Aga Khan University, Kampala

Services
- Emergency department: I
- Beds: 150 (2026), 600 (2030)

History
- Founded: 29 April 2024 (Outpatients); 2026 (Inpatients) Expected

Links
- Other links: Hospitals in Uganda; Medical education in Uganda

Aga Khan University Hospital, Kampala, is a hospital under construction in Uganda. It is an urban, tertiary, referral and teaching hospital whose planned construction will last five years, starting in 2020. It will be built in two phases. The first phase will consist of 150 beds at an estimated cost of US$100 million. The bed capacity will be increased to 600 during the second phase.

== Location ==
The hospital is located in the neighbourhood called Nakawa, near the junction of Kampala-Jinja Highway and New Port Bell Road. This is located in Nakawa Division, one of the five administrative units of the Kampala Capital City Authority, approximately 4.5 kilometres (3 mi), by road, east of the city's central business district. The approximate coordinates of Aga Khan University Hospital, Kampala are: 0°19'30.0"N, 32°36'50.0"E (Latitude:0.325000; Longitude:32.613889). In May 2023, it was disclosed that the university campus, where the hospital sits, measures 60 acres (24 ha).

== Overview ==
When completed, this hospital will be the third tertiary referral and teaching hospital affiliated with the Aga Khan Development Network. The other two similar hospitals are located in Karachi, Pakistan and in Nairobi, Kenya. It will function as the teaching hospital of Aga Khan University, Kampala, one of four campuses in East Africa, with others in Nairobi, Arusha and Dar es Salaam.

== Aga Khan University, Kampala ==
Aga Khan University, Kampala which currently trains nurses and midwives is expected to start training undergraduate and postgraduate doctors and surgeons at this hospital, when completed.

== Construction ==
The foundation stone for the hospital was laid by the President of Uganda and His Highness the Aga Khan on Thursday, 17 December 2015. The construction of the teaching hospital complex was expected to start in 2020, with completion originally planned in 2022.

Construction of the university campus, student hostels and an outpatient center began in April 2023, marked by a ceremony presided over by Princess Zahra Aga Khan and Janet Museveni the First Lady of Uganda and the country's mister of education. Completion of the student facilities is expected in 2025 with hospital completion due in 2026.

In April 2024, the hospital opened its outpatient specialty centre to patients in eight specialty areas, including pediatrics, general surgery, obstetrics and gynecology, neurology, nephrology, diagnostic radiology, gastroenterology and oncology.

In September 2025, Prince Rahim Aga Khan, who is the Chancellor of the Aga Khan University, Kampala, inaugurated the new campus in Kampala, Uganda, in the presence of Princess Zahara Aga Khan, the university's pro-chancellor. Also present were Yoweri Museveni, the President of Uganda and Janet Kataha Museveni, Uganda's First Lady and Minister of Education. The campus sits on 60 acres (24 ha) in Nakawa Division in Kampala City, Uganda's capital and largest urban center. Facilities include a School of Nursing and Midwifery, a post-graduate medical school that teaches medical and surgical specialists including internists and surgeons, and a specialized teaching hospital.

== See also ==
- List of hospitals in Uganda
- List of universities in Uganda
