= Journal of Gastrointestinal Surgery =

- Discipline: Surgery
- Language: English
- Edited by: Richard A. Hodin, Timothy M. Pawlik

Publication details
- History: 1997-present
- Publisher: Springer Science+Business Media on behalf of the Society for Surgery of the Alimentary Tract
- Frequency: Monthly
- Open access: Hybrid
- Impact factor: 3.452 (2020)

Standard abbreviations
- ISO 4: J. Gastrointest. Surg.

Indexing
- ISSN: 1091-255X (print); 1873-4626 (web)
- OCLC no.: 605108518

Links
- Journal homepage; Online archive; Online archive at Elsevier website (1997-2006)

The Journal of Gastrointestinal Surgery is a monthly peer-reviewed medical journal covering surgery of the gastrointestinal tract. It was established in 1997 and originally published on behalf of the Society for Surgery of the Alimentary Tract by Elsevier, before transferring to Springer Science+Business Media in 2007. The editors-in-chief are Richard A. Hodin (Harvard Medical School) and Timothy M. Pawlik (Ohio State University).

== Abstracting and indexing ==
The journal is abstracted and indexed in:

- CAB Abstracts
- CINAHL
- Current Contents/Clinical Medicine
- EBSCO databases
- Embase
- Index Medicus/MEDLINE/PubMed
- Science Citation Index Expanded
- Scopus

According to the Journal Citation Reports, the journal has a 2020 impact factor of 3.452.
