= Sulaiman Shahabuddin =

President of Aga Khan University

3rd President of Aga Khan University
- Incumbent
- Assumed office 15 September 2021

Personal details
- Occupation: University president

Sulaiman Shahabuddin is the third President of the Aga Khan University and a former health care executive. Prior to taking office on 15 September 2021, Shahabuddin served as the regional CEO of the Aga Khan Health Services (AKHS) in East Africa.
