= Hasan B. Alam =

Pakistani-American surgeon

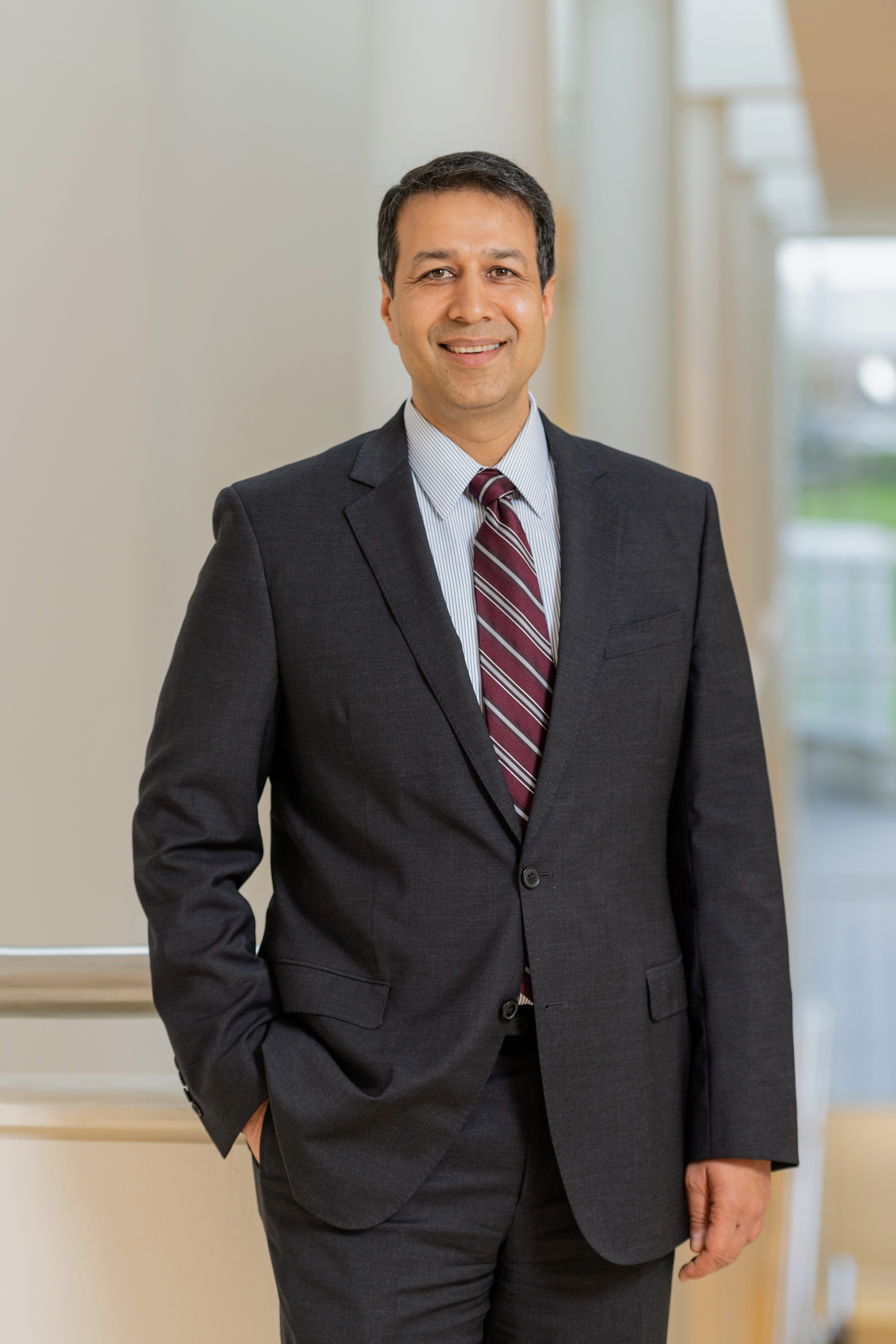
- Born: August 29, 1966 (age 60); Quetta, Pakistan
- Title: Chair, Department of Surgery, Northwestern University, Chicago, USA
- Spouse: Tracy Alam
- Children: Mayah and Aliya
- Awards: American Heart Association Lifetime Achievement Award for Trauma Resuscitation Science

Academic background
- Education: Aga Khan University Medical College (1990); Uniformed Services University of the Health Sciences

Academic work
- Institutions: Harvard Medical School; Massachusetts General Hospital; Michigan Medicine (2012-2020); Feinberg School of Medicine; Northwestern Memorial Hospital
- Website: The Alam Laboratory

Hasan Badre Alam is a Pakistani-American trauma surgeon, surgeon-scientist, and a medical professor in the United States. He is the Loyal and Edith Davis Professor of Surgery, the Chairman of Department of Surgery at the Feinberg School of Medicine (FSM)/Northwestern University, and the Surgeon-in-Chief at Northwestern Memorial Hospital (NMH) in Chicago.

Alam is an academic trauma surgeon. He is an international leader in bench-to-clinic translational trauma research. In 2017, he was awarded the American Heart Association Lifetime Achievement Award for Trauma Resuscitation Science.

== Biography ==
=== Early life and education ===
Alam was born in Quetta, Pakistan. He wanted to be a surgeon from early on in life. After completing medical education at the Aga Khan University Medical College, Pakistan in 1990, he moved to the United States for surgical training.

=== Training and medical career ===
Alam is an American Board of Surgery-certified trauma and critical care surgeon. He completed a surgical residency at the Washington Hospital Center/Georgetown University in Washington, D.C. While taking care of young trauma patients during residency training, Alam realized his passion for trauma surgery. There he also met his mentor, Peter M. Rhee, who served as a major inspiration. After completing residency training, Alam received post-doctoral research training at the Uniformed Services University of Health Sciences (USUHS) in Bethesda, MD. Prior to moving to the University of Michigan in 2012, Alam served as the Professor of Surgery at the Harvard Medical School in Boston, Massachusetts. There he acted as the Founding Medical Director of Multi-Specialty Intensive Care Unit, and the Director of Surgical Critical Care Fellowship Program at Massachusetts General Hospital (MGH). He was also the director of research in the Division of Trauma at MGH. During his time at MGH, he received an Honorary master's degree (Artium Magistrum) from Harvard University.

Alam served as the Norman W. Thompson Professor of Surgery, and the Section Head of General Surgery at Michigan Medicine, Ann Arbor, Michigan from 2012 to 2020. He now serves as the Chairman of the Department of Surgery at Northwestern Medicine in Chicago. "It's a bigger stage, more complex healthcare system, located in an iconic city. It puts you on a growth trajectory where you are learning new things and growing constantly. These new challenges keep you engaged and energized", said Alam in 2021. "If a patient enters a facility that has the Northwestern Medicine logo on it, they should rest assured that they will get the right care — no matter which door they enter," he added.

He has delivered lectures at national and international forums on topics ranging from combat casualty care to achieving academic success in surgery. In 2010, he was featured on the ABC television series Boston Med. He served as the Chair of the Massachusetts Committee on Trauma from 2009 to 2012. He is the vice-chair of the Multi-institutional Trials Committee for the American Association for the Surgery of Trauma. He currently serves on the editorial board of multiple journals including the Annals of Surgery, the Journal of the American College of Surgeons, and the Journal of Trauma and Acute Care Surgery.

== Research and clinical interests ==
Alam's clinical focuses are in the areas of emergency general surgery, trauma, and surgical critical care. His research focuses on traumatic brain injury, hemorrhagic shock, cell preservation and response modulation to injuries, hemorrhage control, and development of novel treatments for sepsis. His research is funded by various national funding agencies including the National Institutes of Health (NIH), the Office of Naval Research (ONR), and the United States Department of Defense (D.o.D).

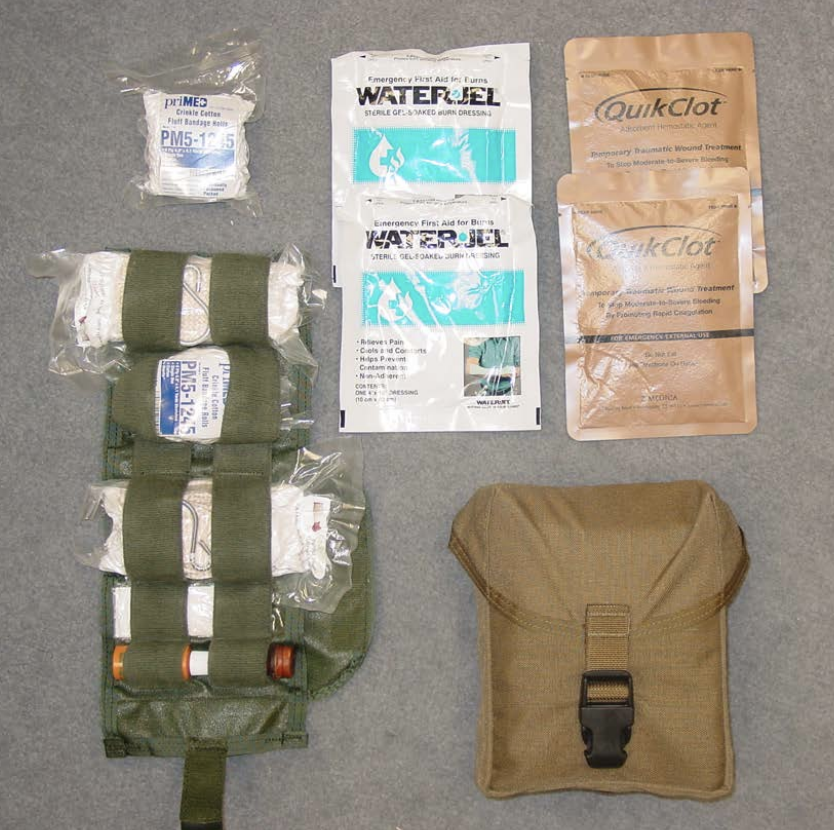
Military First Aid Kit with QuickClot®

Alam has authored more than 350 peer-reviewed manuscripts with around 19,000 citations, and has the h-index of 71. In 2001, in collaboration with the Office of Naval Research, Alam was the first to successfully test the hemostatic dressing QuickClot® for use on the battlefield. For him, this meant "your buddy has to stop the bleeding, not the medic, not the surgeon". Within months of testing, QuickClot® was deployed for use by the special operation forces in Afghanistan. His work on QuickClot® has been featured in an interview on the surgery podcast series Behind the Knife.

Alam's work on suspended animation models and therapeutic hypothermia as a treatment strategy to improve outcomes in trauma patients received international coverage. By suspending hundreds of injured pigs in hypothermia for more than an hour each, Alam has proved that crucial time can be bought to fix lethal injuries without compromising the vital organs. "With the pig essentially dead (in hypothermia), we've got hours to fix it", says Alam. His work helped in the conception of a federally funded clinical trial on the use of profound hypothermia in patients with traumatic arrest.

His ongoing research aims to create 'survivors out of non-survivors' using novel cell-preserving drugs that target epigenetic modulation to treat critically ill trauma patients. The aim is to create an economical, shelf-stable and easy to administer treatment, in the form of a pill or an injection, that the soldiers can use on the battlefield to survive the critical first few hours of injuries. "If we can sustain the patient through the first few hours, not only will they recover, but they can return to being contributing members of society", says Alam. One such drug, valproic acid, is currently under clinical testing for use in hemorrhagic shock and traumatic brain injury.

== The Alam Laboratory ==
Alam has led a trauma research laboratory that started at the Uniformed Services University and then moved to the Massachusetts General Hospital, before relocating to the University of Michigan, Ann Arbor. Currently, the laboratory is housed in the Feinberg School of Medicine Campus in Downtown Chicago.
