= Aga Khan University =

University in Karachi, Pakistan, with campuses in various countries

Coordinates: 24.8928°N 67.0747°E

- Seal of AKU
- Other name: AKU
- Type: Private research university
- Established: 1983; 43 years ago
- Affiliations: HEC; PMC; CAP; Joint Commission
- Chancellor: Aga Khan
- President: Sulaiman Shahabuddin
- Provost: Tania Bubela
- Location: Pakistan; Kenya; Tanzania; Uganda; United Kingdom
- Campus: Urban
- Language: English
- Colours
- Mascot: The AKU Leopard
- Website: www.aku.edu

Aga Khan University is a private research university based in Karachi, Pakistan. It is a non-profit institution and an agency of the Aga Khan Development Network. It was founded in 1983 as Pakistan's first private university. Starting in 2000, the university expanded to Kenya, Tanzania, Uganda, the United Kingdom and Afghanistan.

AKU began life as a health-sciences university. It is among the largest private health-care providers in Pakistan and East Africa. AKU hospitals were the first in those regions accredited by U.S.-based Joint Commission International.

More recently, the university has initiated programmes in teacher education, the study of Muslim civilisations, journalism, early childhood development and public policy. The university has also launched an undergraduate liberal-arts programme to educate future leaders in a wide range of fields and establish additional graduate professional schools.

== History ==
Founded in 1983 by Prince Aga Khan IV, The Aga Khan University (AKU) stands as one of the agencies within the Aga Khan Development Network. In 1964, plans for the construction of the Aga Khan Hospital and Medical College were announced by the Chancellor. Subsequently, in 1980, the contract for the main complex of Aga Khan University Hospital and Medical College was signed in London.

A significant milestone occurred in 1983 when the Charter of the university was presented to the Chancellor by the former President of Pakistan, establishing it as the first private international university in Pakistan. That same year marked the graduation of the first class from the university's School of Nursing. The inauguration of Aga Khan University Hospital in Karachi followed in 1985.

The university's medical college witnessed its first batch of graduates in 1989. In 1994, the Institute for Educational Development in Karachi was inaugurated. The year 2001 saw the launch of the Advanced Nursing Studies Programme in Uganda, while in 2002, the Institute for the Study of Muslim Civilisations was established in London.

Continuing its expansion, Aga Khan Hospital in Nairobi was upgraded to Aga Khan University Hospital in 2005. The following year, in 2006, the Institute for Educational Development in East Africa was inaugurated, alongside the French Medical Institute for Children in Kabul, managed by AKU.

In 2007, the Examination Board conducted its first Secondary School Certificate examinations. The year 2015 marked a significant achievement for Aga Khan University, Tanzania, as it was granted a University Charter by President Jakaya Kikwete. In 2012, the Graduate School of Media and Communications, Institute for Human Development, and East Africa Institute were founded.

In 2021, Aga Khan University, Kenya, received a charter from President Uhuru Kenyatta. The subsequent academic years, 2022–23, witnessed the launch of the Faculty of Arts and Sciences on the Stadium Road Campus in Karachi, Pakistan. Stephen Lyon was appointed as the Inaugural Dean in September 2022, and the Faculty officially launched in September 2023.

== Academics ==
The Aga Khan University accounts for 75 percent of all biomedical research in Pakistan while the remaining 25 percent is shared by all the other institutions. AKU publishes more research articles in peer-reviewed, indexed internationally recognised journals than any other university in Pakistan. Faculty promotions are dependent on publications in indexed journals while most medical students have published by the time they graduate. Undergraduate medical students have published up to 50 research papers in indexed health journals.

It is one of the few universities in Pakistan to provide research facilities to students at the undergraduate level. The university maintains a research office to guide and support research conducted at the university. A University Research Council also funds grants after a competitive review process facilitated by a Grants Review Committee. Particular emphasis is also placed on community related health sciences research. AKU organizes international and national research workshops and seminars. A Health Sciences Research Assembly is held annually in which faculty and students present their research.

The university is a site for NIH clinical trials. The seal (logo) of the Aga Khan University is a visual representation of the principles which underlie the founding of the university. The circular form of the seal has its roots in the rosettes of early Islamic periods. It also symbolizes the world and reflects the internationality of the Aga Khan University. At the centre of the seal is a star or sun representing light – a universal symbol of the enlightenment that education provides. The light is also symbolic of Nur (divine light). The star incorporates 49 points to commemorate the university's founding by Prince Karim Aga Khan, the Forty-Ninth imam of the Ismaili Muslims. The outer ring circumscribes a Quranic Ayat (3:103) rendered in classic thuluth script.

== Campuses ==
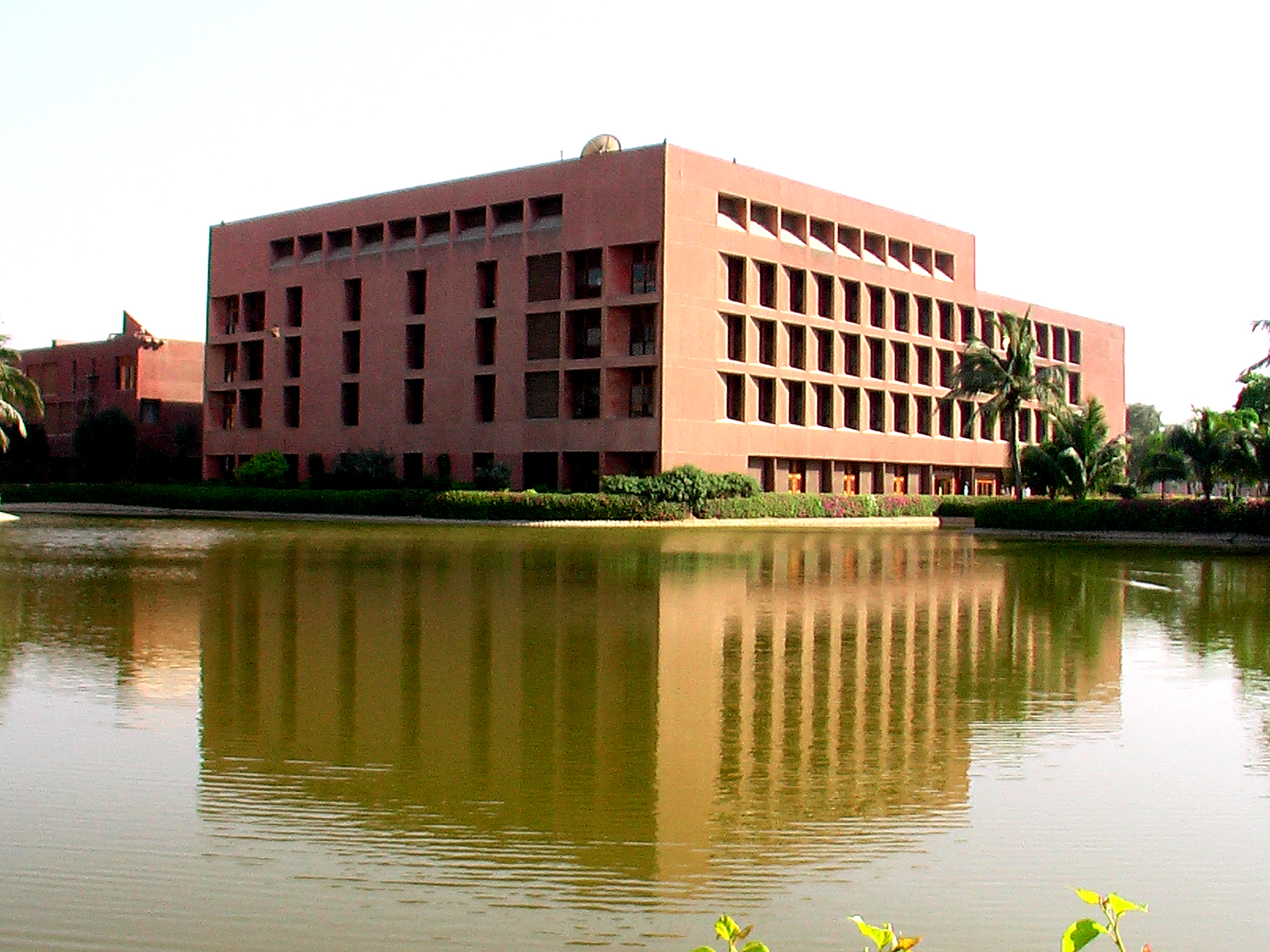
Aga Khan University's Karachi campus.

The Aga Khan University is an international university, operating on campuses in Central and South Asia, the African Great Lakes, Europe and the Middle East. In Pakistan, the university is a 340,000-square-metre (84-acre) campus including a hospital with two on-campus male and female hostels with a capacity of 300 each. It has a sports and rehabilitation center which is one of the best in Pakistan, with an Olympic-standard swimming pool, cricket practice nets, tennis courts, indoor gymnasium with wooden flooring, squash courts and gyms. It has cricket and football grounds with jogging tracks.

Existing campuses and international programmes include:

- Faculty of Health Sciences located on a 340,000-square-metre (84-acre) campus in the heart of Karachi, Pakistan, built in the 1980s
- Aga Khan University of Health Sciences campus in Nairobi, Kenya
- Faculty of Arts and Sciences housed in the University Centre on the Stadium Road Campus in Karachi, Pakistan. The Faculty of Arts and Sciences offers undergraduate majors in Asian and Middle Eastern Studies, Social and Development Studies, Human and Environmental Biology, and Politics Philosophy and Economics.
- Institute for Educational Development in the Karimabad area of Karachi, Pakistan and Dar es Salaam, Tanzania
- Institute for the Study of Muslim Civilisations in London, United Kingdom
- A USD 450 million campus planned for Arusha, in north-eastern Tanzania to be built in the next 15 years
- Advanced Nursing Studies (ANS) Programmes at campuses in Kenya, Tanzania and Uganda
- Programmes for capacity development for teachers and nurses in Afghanistan, Egypt and Syria.
- Aga Khan University Kampala, sits on a 60 acres (24 ha) in Nakawa Division in Kampala City, Uganda's capital and largest urban center. Facilities include a School of Nursing and Midwifery, a post-graduate medical school teaching medical and surgical specialists including internists and surgeons, and a specialized teaching hospital.

== Grading System ==
The Aga Khan University (AKU) uses an absolute grading system with a fixed range. The grading table is:

== Institutes and Graduate Schools ==
The university is home to several teaching and research Institutes on its different campuses. The Institutes each drive one of the thematic priorities of AKU and AKDN. In London, the Institute for the Study of Muslim Civilisations is a dedicated interdisciplinary research and graduate school that brings together humanities scholars and social scientists to critically engage with cultural, historical, political, economic, legal and religious aspects of Muslim societies. In Pakistan and East Africa, AKU has two Institutes that focus on education: the Institute for Educational Development Pakistan, and Institute for Educational Development East Africa.

=== Institute for the Study of Muslim Civilisations ===
The Institute for the Study of Muslim Civilisations (AKU-ISMC) was founded in 2002 and accepted its first intake of graduate students in 2006. The AKU-ISMC offers an MA in Muslim Cultures. The MA is accredited by the Higher Education Commission (Pakistan) of Pakistan and regulated by the Quality Assurance Agency in the UK. Since 2018, AKU-ISMC has been based in the Aga Khan Centre in the King's Cross area of London. The Aga Khan Centre was designed by the architect Fumihiko Maki.

In 2020, AKU signed a partnership with Columbia University launching a dual masters in September 2020.

=== Institute for Educational Development - Pakistan and Tanzania, East Africa. ===
The Institute for Educational Development in Karachi and East Africa (AKU-IED) is a center for developing teachers, educators, education managers, researchers and policy makers. Apart from teacher training, AKU-IED offers MEd (Masters of Education) and PhD. in Education as well. Established in 2003. AKU-EB is a federal Board of Intermediate and Secondary education in Pakistan. AKU-EB examines students at SSC and HSSC level.

=== Graduate School of Media and Communications ===
Launched in 2015, the Aga Khan University Graduate School of Media and Communications (GSMC) is focused on education and tailored training for journalists, communicators and media executives and entrepreneurs in East Africa and beyond. On 7 December 2019, GSMC announced a partnership with Facebook to launch the Video Journalism Fellowship.

== Notable people ==
=== Alumni ===
- Hasan B. Alam, trauma surgeon in the United States.
- Adeel A. Butt, professor of medicine and infectious disease specialist
- Adil Haider, trauma surgeon and outcomes research scientist in the United States
- Naeem Rahim, nephrologist and founder of Idaho based JRM Foundation for humanity
- Saad Omer, vaccinologist, infectious disease epidemiologist, and inaugural Director of the O'Donnell School of Public Health.

=== Faculty ===
- Abdul Gaffar Billoo, pediatric endocrinologist, professor of clinical pediatrics at the Aga Khan University (AKU)
- John Harland Bryant, former professor of Community Health Sciences
- Zulfiqar Bhutta, Director of the Institute for Global Health and Development
- Sahabzada Yaqub Khan, former foreign minister of Pakistan
- Marleen Temmerman, Chair of the Department of Obstetrics and Gynaecology, Aga Khan University Kenya
- Leif Stenberg, Professor of Islamic Studies and former Dean of the Institute for the Study of Muslim Civilisations (from 2017 to 2023) (UK)

== Awards and Accolades ==
- Centre for Innovation in Medical Education is South Asia's first to be accredited by US-based Society for Simulation in Healthcare.
- Village Land Use Plan awarded the Society for College and University Planning's Merit Award for Excellence in Planning for a District or Campus Component.
- Medical College (Pakistan) Urban Health Programme awarded MacJannet Prize for Global Citizenship 2009.
- Zairi International Award in Higher Education 2022, Award of Excellence for Disruptive Education.
- Aga Khan University's Hayat app has been awarded a silver medal at the international Digital Health Awards 2023.

== See also ==
- Aga Khan University Hospital
- Aga Khan Development Network
- Education in Uganda
- List of universities in Uganda
