= Naeem Rahim =

American nephrologist

- Born: January 22, 1976 (age 50); Peshawar, Pakistan
- Education: Aga Khan University (MBBS)
- Occupation: Nephrologist
- Spouse: Amna Noreen Mannan
- Children: 3

Naeem Rahim (born January 1, 1976) is a Pakistani-American nephrologist and musician. He is the founder of Idaho-based JRM foundation For Humanity and co-founder of Idaho Kidney Institute. He was one of the first Idahoans to receive the Ellis Island Medals of Honor in the last 25 years.

== Early life and education ==
Naeem Rahim was born in Peshawar, Pakistan as his father Mohammad Rahim was an Army officer and mother was a nurse in the Army. He went to Habib public school Karachi for matriculation and went to Aga Khan medical college for medicine graduated in 1998. He is fluent in English, Urdu and Punjabi.

== Career ==
=== Medical practice ===
Naeem and his brother Fahim Rahim trained from New York Medical College in internal medicine and later nephrology. They chose to move to a small town in Idaho to provide better health care to the much needed rural America. Naeem Rahim and Fahim Rahim both received Ellis Island Medals of Honor in 2010 and subsequently multiple congressional records in recognition of their services to the state of Idaho. Naeem was one of the first Idahoans to receive the Ellis Island Medals of Honor. They decided to honor the people of Idaho and started JRM foundation For humanity. Fahim Rahim and Naeem also started Idaho hometown heroes Medal which identifies and celebrates individuals who serve their communities in Idaho. Naeem was showcased as success stories of Pakistanis on a TV show called Reema Ka Amreeka hosted by famous Pakistani actress Reema Khan.

== Awards ==
- Recipient of US Senate Congressional Record in 2007 from Senator Mike Crapo.
- Recipient of Ellis Island Medals of Honor, in 2011.
- Recipient of Congressional Record by US House of Representatives in July, 2011 (Hon. Dan Burton of Indiana, Co-chair Congressional Pakistan Caucus)
- Recipient of Congressional Record by US House 112th Congress Sept. 2011
