= Abdul Gaffar Billoo =

Pakistani philanthropist (born 1937)

Abdul Ghaffar Billoo
- عبد الغفار بلّو
- Born: Abdul Ghaffar; 14 January 1937 (age 89); Junagadh, Gujarat, India
- Education: Dow Medical College; Royal College of Physicians of Edinburgh; Royal College of Physicians and Surgeons of Glasgow
- Known for: HANDS Pakistan (founder and chairman)
- Spouse: Hajra Billoo (m. 1960)
- Awards: Sitara-i-Imtiaz (2007)
- Scientific career
- Fields: Pediatric, Philanthropy
- Workplaces: Aga Khan University; Memon Medical Institute Hospital; HANDS Pakistan; Pakistan Centre for Autism
- Website: www.hands.org.pk

Abdul Ghaffar Billoo (Urdu: عبد الغفار بلّو born 14 January 1937) is a Pakistani philanthropist who founded HANDS International, a nonprofit organisation in Pakistan, which has been working since 1975. As a paediatric endocrinologist, he served at the Aga Khan University (AKU) as professor of clinical paediatrics. He was awarded the Sitara-i-Imtiaz for public service, the country's most prestigious civilian award, by then-President of Pakistan General Pervez Musharraf in March 2007.

== Early life ==
Billoo was born in Junagadh in 1937. He received his early education from his native town in India after partition of India his family was migrated to Pakistan.

== Education ==
Billoo obtained his MBBS degree from Dow Medical College in 1959. He received his Diploma in Child Health, Tropical Medicine, and Hygiene from the United Kingdom in 1962. He was qualified for his MRCP in 1964 and appointed a Fellow of Royal College of Physicians of Edinburgh in 1986.

== Career ==
Billoo started his professional career in 1959 from Jinnah Postgraduate Medical Centre. He joined Institute of Tropical Medicine and Hygiene on 1962 located in Glasgow. He was appointed as Registrar in Pediatrics at Seafield Sick Children Hospital Ayrshire, Scotland in 1962 where he worked for three years. After four years in the United Kingdom he came back to Pakistan and started practicing as Pediatrician later in September 1998 he joined Aga Khan University Hospital as chairman of Department of Pediatrics in the university. He not only served as professor and Head of Pediatrics Department in Dow Medical College but also was the part of University of Karachi as Dean Faculty of Medicine for three years.

== Honors and awards ==
- 1964 – Membership for Royal College of Physicians and Surgeons of Glasgow.
- 1975 – Founder and chairman for HANDS Pakistan.
- 1986 – Fellowship of Royal College of Physicians of Edinburgh.
- 2007 – Sitara-i-Imtiaz from Government of Pakistan.
- 2012 – Professor Emeritus from Aga Khan University.

== Publications ==
Billo has more than 200 publications top 20 publications in United States National Library of Medicine as follows:

- Role of a Probiotic (Saccharoyces boularidii) in management and prevention of diarrhoea.
- Comparison of oral versus injectable vitamin-D for the treatment of nutritional vitamin-D deficiency rickets.
- Incomplete Kawaski disease: are we missing it?
- Perception and practices of breastfeeding of infants 0–6 months in an urban and a semi-urban community in Pakistan: a cross-sectional study.
- Familial chylomicronemia in a nine months old infant.
- A family with acute intermittent porphyria.
- Pulmonary agenesis—vascular airway compression and gastroesophageal reflux influence outcome.
- Association of literacy of mothers with malnutrition among children under three years of age in rural area of district Malir, Karachi.
- Association between iron deficiency anemia and febrile seizures.
- Profile of children with congenital adrenal hyperplasia—a hospital study.
- Impact of socioeconomic conditions on perinatal mortality in Karachi.
- Cefixime: an oral option for the treatment of multidrug-resistant enteric fever in children.
- Detection and management of pneumonia by community health workers-a community intervention study in Rehri village, Pakistan.
- Rehabilitation of grade III protein energy malnutrition on out patients basis.
- Risk factors of persistent diarrhoea in children below five years of age.
- Expanded programme of immunisation in Karachi.
- A change of Plasmodium species infecting children in Karachi over the last decade.
- A traditional diet as part of oral rehydration therapy in severe acute diarrhoea in young children.
- Comparative clinical trial of acceptability of flavoured vs non-flavoured ORS (WHO formula).
- Efficacy of co-trimoxazole in infantile gastro-enteritis.
- Abstracts in World Health Organization's Imemr database.

== Philanthropy ==
Billoo founded Health and Nutrition Development Society (HANDS) with his few close friends which has been serving humanity since 1975. It works on health, human rights, education, disaster management and poverty alleviation.
