= Tania Bubela =

Scientist and researcher

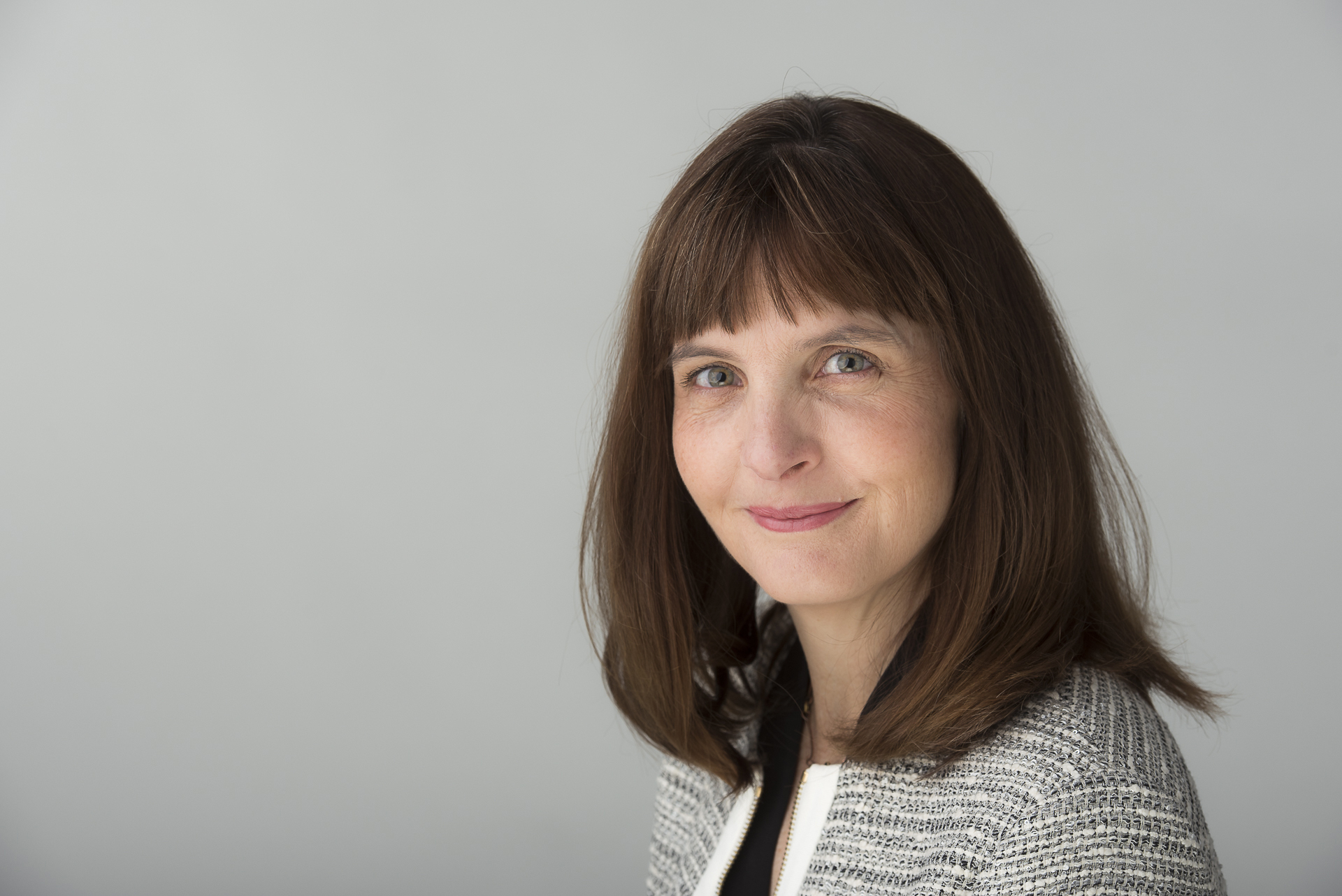
- in 2019
- Born: Canberra, Australia
- Spouse: David S. Hik
- Children: 2

Academic background
- Education: BS.c., 1988, Australian National University; PhD, University of Sydney; JD., 2003, University of Alberta
- Thesis: Social effects of sterilising free-ranging Vixens (Vulpes vulpes L.) in subalpine Australia (1995)
- Academic advisor: Timothy Caulfield

Academic work
- Discipline: Biological sciences
- Institutions: University of Toronto; University of Alberta; Simon Fraser University

Tania Marjorie Bubela FRSC is a professor and dean in the Faculty of Health Sciences at Simon Fraser University.

== Education ==
Born and raised in Australia, Bubela earned her bachelor's degree in 1988 from the Australian National University and her PhD from the University of Sydney.

== Career ==
In 1995, Bubela moved to Canada to teach in the Department of Zoology at the University of Toronto. She later moved to Alberta in 1999 to attend the University of Alberta as a grad student. After earning her law degree, Bubela clerked for Louise Arbour at the Supreme Court of Canada.

After passing the Law Society of Alberta, Bubela earned a position with the University of Alberta School of Business and later in their School of Public Health. Beginning in 2008, Bubela became a Principal Investigator with the Canadian Stem Cell Network.

She later collaborated with Christopher McCabe to co-lead the PACEOMICS program on the development of cost-effective personalized medicine. In 2012, Bubela co-edited "Genetic Resources and Traditional Knowledge: Case Studies and Conflicting Interests" with E. Richard Gold, which was published through the Cambridge University Press.

In 2014, Bubela was promoted to Full Professor and named Associate Dean of Research. She held this position for two years before Kim Raine replaced her. During the 2014–15 academic year, Bubela was the recipient of a McCalla Professorship, an award given to "outstanding academics who have made significant contributions to their field of research, teaching and learning." The next year, Bubela was appointed to the inaugural Steering Committee by the Council of Canadian Academies and sat on the Canadian Institutes of Health Research Peer Review Committee. In 2017, Bubela was named Dean of Health Sciences at Simon Fraser University (SFU).

While at SFU, Bubela helped establish the Indigenous Pathways Planning Group. She was also elected a member of the Canadian Academy of Health Sciences in 2018.

In 2019, Bubela was elected a Fellow of the Royal Society of Canada. On March 5, 2019, Bubela was elected a member of the Board of Directors for the Institute for Health System Transformation and Sustainability. During the 2019–20 academic year, Bubela sat on the 2019–2020 Clinical Trials BC Advisory Council.

== Selected publications ==
The following is a list of selected publications:

- Genetic resources and traditional knowledge: case studies and conflicting interests. Cheltenham: Elgar. 2012. ISBN 9781848442238.

== See also ==
- Genetic resources
- Traditional knowledge
