= Florida Sea Grant College Program =

The mission of Florida Sea Grant, which is headquartered at the University of Florida in Gainesville, Florida, is to help create a sustainable coastal economy and environment through research, education, and extension. Florida Sea Grant is a program under the National Oceanic and Atmospheric Administration's National Sea Grant Network. Florida Sea Grant has extension agents in sixteen Florida colleges and in all of Florida's coastal counties except seven. The Boating and Waterway Management Program is one of its program areas.
