= JAMA Surgery =

Journal published by American Medical Association

- Language: English
- Edited by: Melina Kibbe

Publication details
- Former name(s): Archives of Surgery
- History: 1920-present
- Publisher: American Medical Association (United States)
- Impact factor: 16.681 (2021)

Standard abbreviations
- ISO 4: JAMA Surg.

Indexing
- ISSN: 2168-6254 (print); 2168-6262 (web)

Links
- Journal homepage

JAMA Surgery is an international peer-reviewed journal, which began publication in 1920. It is the official publication of the Association of VA Surgeons, the Pacific Coast Surgical Association, and the Surgical Outcomes Club. It is a member of the JAMA Network, a consortium of peer-reviewed, general medicine and specialty publications. Its current (2022) editor-in-chief is Melina Kibbe at the University of North Carolina at Chapel Hill.

Published online weekly, every Wednesday, JAMA Surgery is also published in print/online issues 12 times a year. In 2021, the journal logged over 3.8 million web sessions and more than 4.7 million article views and downloads. Without any author fees, all research articles are made free access online 12 months after publication on the website. In addition, the online version is freely available or nearly so to institutions in developing countries through the World Health Organization's HINARI program.

== History ==
In July 1920, the first issue of Archives of Surgery was published by the American Medical Association. William J. Mayo, MD, who was a member of the editorial board and authored the inaugural editorial, indicated that Archives of Surgery would follow the character and scope of its sister journals, Archives of Internal Medicine, Archives of Neurology and Psychiatry, and the American Journal of Diseases of Children. Mayo also commented that Archives of Surgery would not compete with the other two prominent surgical journals that existed at the time: Annals of Surgery, established in 1885, and Surgery, Gynecology and Obstetrics, established in 1905. The trustees who founded Archives of Surgery believed that creating this new surgical journal would help alleviate the publication burden of the other two surgical journals while also creating a "sphere of its own" that would be "sufficiently useful to the profession to warrant its entering the field".

One of the most notable changes for Archives of Surgery occurred in January 2013 when the name was changed to JAMA Surgery. This name change occurred across the entire JAMA Network.

=== Editors-in-chief, 1920 to present ===
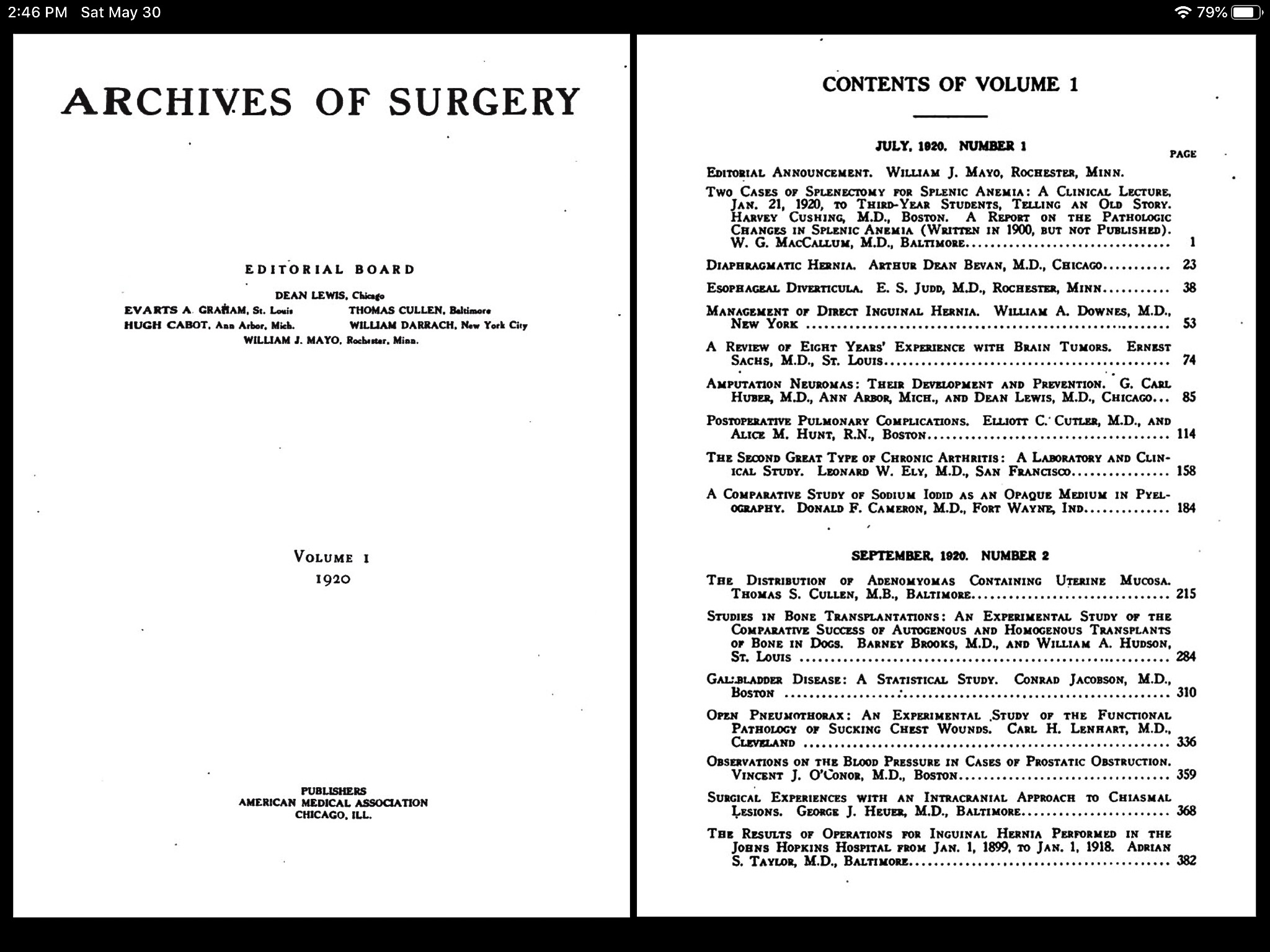
Table of contents for the first issue of Archives of Surgery, July 1920

- Dean Lewis, MD; 1920–1940
- Waltman Walters, MD; 1941–1942, 1946–1961
- Lester Dragstedt, MD; 1943–1945
- J. Garrett Allen, MD; 1962–1969
- Richard Warren, MD; 1970–1976
- Arthur Baue, MD; 1977–1988
- Julie Ann Freischlag, MD; 2005–2014
- Melina Kibbe, MD; 2015–present

== Editorial information ==
The acceptance rate for JAMA Surgery is 14% with a median time to first decision in 10 days and 38 days with review. All articles are published online first. Additional information on the types of articles published and editorial policies is available in the journal's "Instructions for Authors".

JAMA Surgery is abstracted and indexed in Index Medicus/MEDLINE/PubMed. It is also included on the University Grants Commission of India list of approved journals.

== World ranking ==
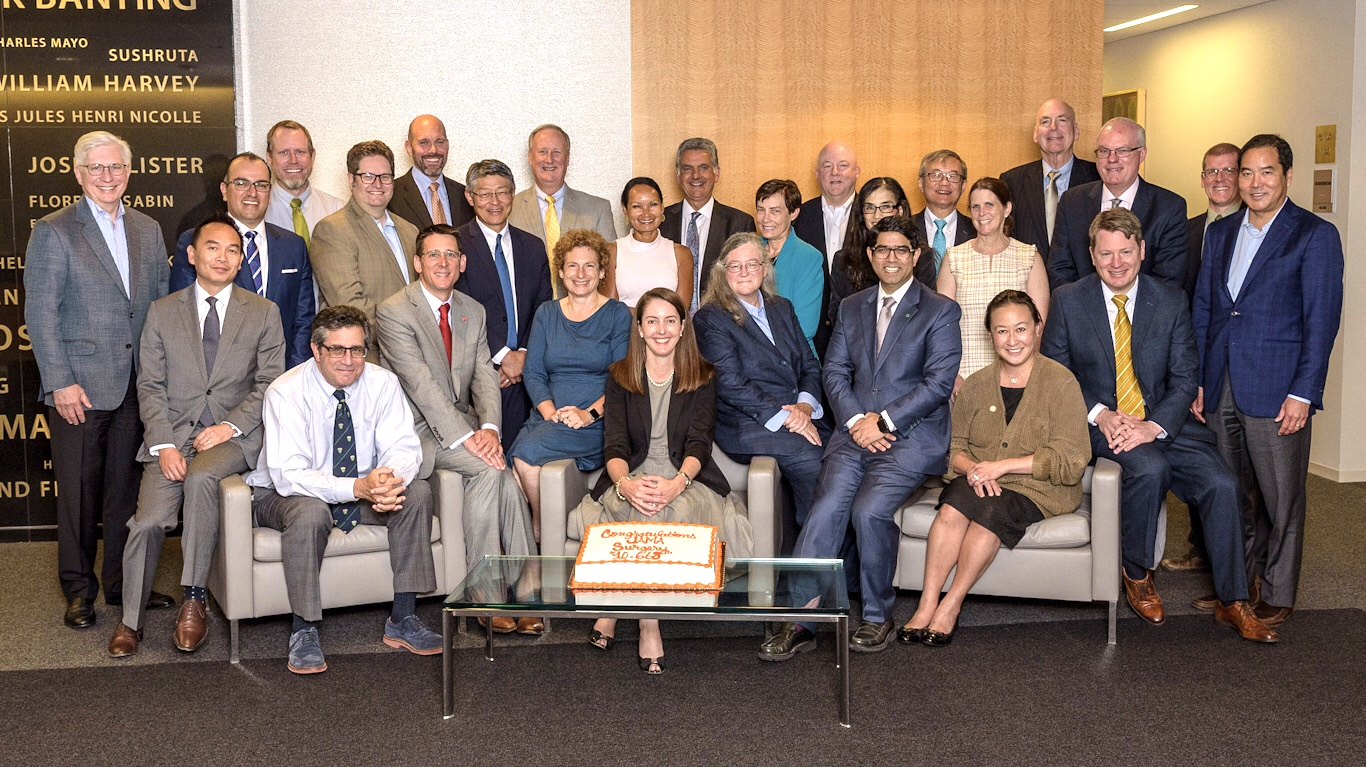
The editorial board of JAMA Surgery celebrates its 2018 ranking as the top surgery journal in the world; Melina R. Kibbe, MD, editor-in-chief, seated at center.

According to the annual Journal Citation Reports, the 2021 impact factor for JAMA Surgery is 16.681, making it the highest-ranking surgery journal in the world. This continues a precedent that the journal set in 2018 as the first surgery publication to break double digits in that scientometric index.

Impact Factors for JAMA Surgery, 2002–2021
Year	IF	Year	IF	Year	IF	Year	IF	Year	IF
2002	2.55	2003	2.75	2004	3.08	2005	3.05	2006	3.06
2007	3.49	2008	4.26	2009	4.32	2010	4.50	2011	4.42
2012	4.10	2013	4.30	2014	4.42	2015	5.66	2016	7.96
2017	8.50	2018	10.67	2019	13.63	2020	14.77	2021	16.68

== See also ==
- List of American Medical Association journals
