= Association for Academic Surgery =

Surgical research organization

The Association for Academic Surgery is the world's largest organization dedicated exclusively to the promotion of surgical research. It has about 3,000 active and senior members. Its annual meeting is the association's main forum to communicate scientific progress in surgery. Until 2005, the association held its own meetings. These meetings were hosted by surgical university departments in the United States. In 2006, the organization merged its annual meeting with the annual meeting of the Society of University Surgeons to form the "Academic Surgical Congress".

== History ==
The Association for Academic Surgery was founded by U.S. American surgeon-scientists in 1967. It was grown steadily over the past few decades and now counts about 3,000 members from the United States and other countries. Since its inception, most of its members have been younger academic surgeons at the assistant professor or associate professor level.

== Mission ==
The mission of the organization is to promote surgical research investigations through the communication of ideas between surgical residents, surgical fellows, junior surgical faculty and full professors and through awarding surgical research grants. Members and leaders of the association usually maintain active laboratories or academic research programs (e.g. in outcome research) at their institutions. In recent years, the association has increased its international involvement and taken a role in policy development. More members are from outside North America than in the past.

== Membership and age limit ==
Surgeons interested in academic research may join the association even before they have completed their surgical training. Active membership is available to senior residents, chief residents and surgical fellows that are enrolled in recognized training programs for general surgery or surgical subspecialties. The majority of active members are junior faculty members at a major university. The period of active membership ends already 10 years after the first academic faculty appointment. Members then superannuate and become senior members. Senior members are no eligible to serve in administrative or officer positions. After age 60, members are no longer required to pay dues. This is specified in the constitution to keep the association's membership young.

== Communications ==
Active and senior members participate actively in the association's functions. Surgical research teams submit scientific abstracts each summer for presentation at the Academic Surgical Congress early the following year. A majority of members attends the annual Academic Surgical Congress each February where new research papers presented and discussed. The official organ of the Association is the Journal of Surgical Research. In addition, all members receive a newsletter that is published by the AAS Executive Council every six months. This publication describes the ongoing activities of the association and informs members about other pertinent issues facing the association as well as surgery in general.

== Awards ==
The Association for Academic Surgery awards the following grants and prizes to outstanding surgeon-scientists:

- Joel Roslyn Faculty Award to junior surgical faculty members in the first five years of their career
- AAS Foundation Research Fellowship Award to surgical residents in their research fellowships
- AAS/Taiwan Surgical Association International Visiting Professorship Award
- AAS/Royal Australasian College of Surgeons Younger Fellows Committee Leadership Exchange
- AAS/Colombian Surgical Association International Visiting Professorship Award
- AAS Student Travel Grant

== International courses ==
The Association for Academic Surgery conducts annual courses to introduce young surgeon-scientists to surgical science. Topics include surgical career planning, running an academic program, achieving work/life balance, etc.:

- West African Fundamentals of Research & Career Development & MIS Course
- Australasian Developing a Career in Academic Surgery Course
- Columbian Career Development Course
- French Career Development Course
